= Chip discography =

Listing of official releases by Chip (British rapper)

- Studio albums: 4
- Extended plays: 5
- Singles: 22
- Music videos: 22
- Mixtapes: 11

This is a comprehensive listing of official releases by Chip (formerly Chipmunk), a British rapper. His debut studio album I Am Chipmunk was released on 12 October 2009, where it reached number 2 and 49 on the UK Albums Chart and Irish Albums Chart respectively. The album had surpassed platinum-level sales of 300,000 copies in early 2010 and as such was reissued under the name I Am Chipmunk: Platinum Edition on 2 May 2010.

To date, Chipmunk has released 14 singles, the second of which was "Beast" which featured Loick Essien. The promotional single was released on 8 December 2008 and peaked at number 181 in the UK. The first official single "Chip Diddy Chip" was released on 16 January 2009 and reached a peak of number 21 in the UK; marking the rapper's breakthrough. Second single "Diamond Rings" was released on 6 July 2009 and featured vocals from Emeli Sandé. The single peaked at number 6, marking Chipmunk's first Top 10 hit. "Oopsy Daisy" featured Dayo Olatunji was released on 4 October 2009 and topped the UK Singles Chart for a single week; marking Chipmunk's first number-one single. A further Top 10 hit came from "Look for Me" which featured Talay Riley; the single peaked at number 7 in the UK upon release on 28 December 2009. The album's reissued was preceded by "Until You Were Gone" which featured vocals from Dutch pop singer Esmée Denters which was released on 19 April 2010. The single peaked at number 3 in the UK, marking Chipmunk's fourth consecutive Top 10 single. The rapper released single "Flying High" on 12 November 2010 which acts as a promotional/warm up single for the second studio album supposedly named Transition. The lead single from the album, "Champion", features American singer Chris Brown.

== Albums ==
=== Studio albums ===
Title	Details	Peak chart positions			Certifications
Title	Details	UK	UK R&B	IRE	Certifications
I Am Chipmunk	Released: 9 October 2009; Label: Jive, Sony Music; Formats: CD, digital download	2	1	49	BPI: Gold
Transition	Released: 15 April 2011; Label: Jive, Sony Music; Formats: CD, digital download	10	3	98	
League of My Own II	Released: 10 August 2017; Label: Cash Motto; Formats: CD, digital download	12	1	—	
Ten10	Released: 21 September 2018; Label: Cash Motto; Formats: CD, digital download	17	3	—	
Grime Scene Saviour	Released: 18 April 2025; Label: Cash Motto; Formats: CD, digital download	—	—	—	
"—" denotes an album that did not chart or was not released in that territory.

=== Collaborative albums ===
List of collaborative albums, with selected details and chart positions
Title	Album details	Peak chart positions	Certifications
Title	Album details	UK	Certifications
Insomnia (with Skepta and Young Adz)	Released: 27 March 2020; Label: SKC, M29; Formats: CD, digital download	3	BPI: Silver
Neighbourhood (with Nafe Smallz)	Released: 5 July 2024; Label: CMZ; Formats: CD, digital download	49	

=== Mixtapes ===
Title	Details	Peak chart positions
Title	Details	UK
Whatever the Weather Volume 1	Released: 2005; Format: Digital download	—
Whatever the Weather Volume 2	Released: 2007; Label: Reinassance Records; Format: Digital download	—
League of My Own	Released: 2007; Label: Alwayz Recording; Format: Digital download	—
Guess Who?	Released: 8 July 2008; Label: Alwayz Recording; Format: Digital download	—
Fresh Out the Oven	Released: 2008; Format: Digital download	—
For the Fun of It	Released: 2010; Label: Cash Motto & Alwayz Recording; Format: Digital download	—
More Fun! (with Wretch 32)	Released: 26 June 2010; Format: Digital download	—
Spazzz.com	Released: 2011; Label: Cash Motto & Alwayz Recording; Format: Digital download	—
London Boy	Released: 25 December 2012; Label: Grand Hustle; Format: Digital download	—
G.D.O.D. (Get Dough or Die) (with Hustle Gang)	Released: 2013; Label: Grand Hustle; Format: Digital download	—
Rap vs. Grime	Released: 25 December 2015; Label: Cash Motto; Format: Digital download	—
Snakes & Ladders	Released: 29 January 2021; Label: Cash Motto; Format: Digital download, streaming	7

== Extended plays ==
Title	Details
Believe & Achieve: EPisode 1	Released: 4 May 2015; Label: Cash Motto Limited; Format: Digital download
Light Work	Released: 17 September 2015; Label: Cash Motto Limited; Format: Digital download
Believe & Achieve: EPisode 2	Released: 27 November 2015; Label: Cash Motto Limited; Format: Digital download
Hear Dis	Released: 25 December 2015; Label: Cash Motto Limited; Format: Digital download
Power Up	Released: 26 August 2016; Label: Cash Motto Limited; Format: Digital download

== Singles ==
=== As lead artist ===
Title	Year	Peak chart positions						Certifications	Album
Title	Year	UK	UK R&B	AUS	GER	IRE	NZ	Certifications	Album
"Who Are You?"	2007	—	—	—	—	—	—		League of My Own
"Beast" (featuring Loick Essien)	2008	181	10	—	—	—	—		I Am Chipmunk
"Chip Diddy Chip"	2009	21	8	—	—	—	—		I Am Chipmunk
"Diamond Rings" (featuring Emeli Sandé)	2009	6	2	—	—	—	—	BPI: Silver	I Am Chipmunk
"Oopsy Daisy"	2009	1	1	—	46	7	31	BPI: Platinum	I Am Chipmunk
"Look for Me" (featuring Talay Riley)	2009	7	3	—	—	23	—	BPI: Silver	I Am Chipmunk
"Until You Were Gone" (featuring Esmée Denters)	2010	3	2	41	—	24	—	BPI: Silver	I Am Chipmunk
"Flying High"	2010	72	19	—	—	—	—		Transition
"Champion" (featuring Chris Brown)	2011	2	1	—	—	12	—	BPI: Platinum	Transition
"In the Air" (featuring Keri Hilson)	2011	37	13	—	—	—	—		Transition
"Take Off" (featuring Trey Songz)	2011	84	23	—	—	—	—		Transition
"I'm Fine" (featuring Stormzy & Shalo)	2014	—	—	—	—	—	—		Believe & Achieve: Episode 1
"School of Grime" (featuring D Double E & Jammer)	2015	—	—	—	—	—	—		Believe & Achieve: Episode 1
"Feeling Myself" (featuring Kano & Wretch 32)	2015	—	—	—	—	—	—		Believe & Achieve: Episode 1
"My Bruddaz" (featuring Wiley & Frisco)	2015	—	—	—	—	—	—		Believe & Achieve: Episode 2
"D******d"	2015	—	—	—	—	—	—		Non-album single
"Hear Dis" (featuring Stormzy)	2015	199	—	—	—	—	—		Rap vs Grime
"Reaching" (featuring Burna Boy)	2016	—	—	—	—	—	—		Non-album single
"Can't Run Out of Bars"	2016	—	—	—	—	—	—		Power Up
"Gets Like That" (featuring Ghetts)	2017	—	—	—	—	—	—		League of My Own II
"Honestly" (featuring 67)	2017	—	—	—	—	—	—		League of My Own II
"Snap Snap"	2017	—	—	—	—	—	—		League of My Own II
"Marijuana" (featuring MIST)	2018	—	—	—	—	—	—		Non-album single
"Darth Vader"	2018	—	—	—	—	—	—		Ten10
"My Girl" (featuring Red Rat)	2018	—	—	—	—	—	—		Ten10
"CRB Check" (featuring Not3s)	2018	43	28	—	—	—	—	BPI: Silver	Ten10
"Wondering" (with M.O)	2018	91	—	—	—	—	—		Non-album singles
"Emotional" (Remix) (with Kamille featuring Stefflon Don)	2018	—	—	—	—	—	—		Non-album singles
"How It Is" (with Roddy Ricch and Yxng Bane featuring The Plug)	2019	18	7	—	—	—	—	BPI: Silver	Non-album singles
"Your Story" (featuring One Acen)	2019	—	—	—	—	—	—		Non-album singles
"Yard" (with Toddla T)	2019	—	—	—	—	—	—		Non-album singles
"Daily Duppy"	2019	—	—	—	—	—	—		Snakes & Ladders
"Waze" (with Skepta and Young Adz)	2020	18	10	—	—	71	—		Insomnia
"0420"	2020	—	—	—	—	—	—		Snakes & Ladders
"Killer MC"	2020	—	—	—	—	—	—		Snakes & Ladders
"Flowers"	2020	46	32	—	—	—	—		Snakes & Ladders
"Ignite" (featuring Jme & Dizzee Rascal)	2020	—	—	—	—	—	—		Snakes & Ladders
"Lumidee" (featuring Young Adz and Young M.A)	2021	49	—	—	—	—	—		Snakes & Ladders
"—" denotes a single that did not chart or was not released in that territory.

=== As featured artist ===
Title	Year	Peak chart positions			Certifications	Album
Title	Year	UK	AUS	IRE	Certifications	Album
"Skengman Mode" (Frisco featuring Chipmunk and Double S)	2007	74	—	—		Peng Food
"Defeat You" (N-Dubz featuring Chipmunk)	2008	39	—	—		Uncle B
"Tiny Dancer (Hold Me Closer)" (Ironik featuring Chipmunk and Elton John)	2009	3	41	17	BPI: Silver	No Point in Wasting Tears
"I Got Soul" (as part of the Young Soul Rebels)	2009	10	—	19		Non-album single
"In Your Shoes" (Beverley Knight featuring Chipmunk)	2009	—	—	—		100%
"She Likes To" (Wiley featuring J2K, Wrigley, Ice-Kid, Wretch 32, Ghetts, Bashy, Scorcher, Chipmunk and Griminal)	2009	—	—	—		England 10
"Number One Enemy" (Daisy Dares You featuring Chipmunk)	2010	13	—	—		Daisy Dares You
"Game Over" (Tinchy Stryder featuring Giggs, Professor Green, Tinie Tempah, Devlin, Example and Chipmunk)	2010	22	—	—	BPI: Silver	Third Strike
"Pow 2011" (Lethal Bizzle featuring JME, Wiley, Chipmunk, Face, P Money, Ghetts and Kano)	2011	33	—	—		Best of Bizzle
"Teardrop" (The Collective featuring Wretch 32, Ed Sheeran, Labrinth, Tulisa Contostavlos, Tinchy Stryder, Rizzle Kicks, Ms. Dynamite, Chipmunk, Mz Bratt and Dot Rotten)	2011	24	—	—		Non-album singles
"Bow Wow Wow" (Bodyrox featuring Chip and Luciana)	2012	—	—	—		Non-album singles
"Reload" (Wiley featuring Chip and Ms D)	2013	9	—	83	BPI: Silver	The Ascent
"Starlife" (I Octane featuring Chip)	2013	—	—	—		Non-album singles
"All Now" (Mercston featuring Chip)	2015	—	—	—		Non-album singles
"Calling" (GRM Daily featuring Kojo Funds & Chip)	2017	—	—	—		Let’s Work (Vol. 1)
"Man's Not Hot (MC Mix)" (Big Shaq featuring Lethal Bizzle, Chip, Krept & Konan and Jme)	2017	—	—	—		Non-album singles
"Genes" (SL featuring Chipmunk)	2018	90	—	—		Non-album singles
"Jumpy Remix" (Ambush Buzzworl featuring Skepta & Chip)	2018	81	—	—		Non-album singles
"Call Me in the Morning" (The Streets featuring Chip & Grim Sickers)	2018	—	—	—		Non-album singles
"Wine" (Gol$Niggah featuring Chip)	2018	—	—	—		Non-album singles
"Wave Time 2" (Mastermind featuring Chip & Nafe Smallz)	2019	—	—	—		Non-album singles
"Givenchy Bag" (Wiley featuring Future, Nafe Smallz & Chip)	2019	—	—	—		Non-album singles
"Winner" (Bouncer featuring Chip & NorthSideBenji)	2019	—	—	—		The Come Up
"Action" (Ray BLK featuring Chip)	2019	—	—	—		Non-album singles
"Top Striker" (Blasé & Luxo featuring Chip & RV)	2020	—	—	—		Non-album singles
"YNF" (Sleeks featuring Chip)	2020	—	—	—		Non-album singles
"Lock Down" (DJ Frass featuring Chip)	2020	—	—	—		Non-album singles
"L.L.L.L. (Love Life Live Large)" (Dizzee Rascal featuring Chip)	2020	—	—	—		E3 AF
"—" denotes a single that did not chart or was not released in that territory.

== Other charted and certified songs ==
List of other charted/certified songs, showing year released, and album name
Title	Year	Peak chart positions	Certifications	Album
Title	Year	UK	Certifications	Album
"Coward"	2015	—	BPI: Silver	D******d – single
"Corn on the Curb" (Skepta featuring Wiley & Chip)	2016	73		Konnichiwa
"Mains" (with Skepta and Young Adz)	2020	32		Insomnia
"Demons" (with Skepta and Young Adz)	2020	47		Insomnia
"Grown Flex" (featuring Bugzy Malone)	2021	63		Snakes & Ladders
"—" denotes a recording that did not chart.

== Guest appearances ==
Title	Year	Other artist(s)	Album
"Breathe"	2008	Frisco, Cookie	Peng Food
"Do Some Work"	2008	Frisco, Black Da Ripper	Peng Food
"Chinese Whispers"	2008	Wretch 32, Scorcher	Wretchrospective
"Stay with Me"	2008	Ironik, Wiley	No Point in Wasting Tears
"We Got Dem"	2009	Tinchy Stryder	Catch 22
"Take Me Back" (Remix)	2009	Tinchy Stryder, Sway	Catch 22
"Only Tonight"	2009	JLS	"The Club Is Alive" — single
"Suck Yourself"	2009	N-Dubz	Against All Odds
"Big"	2011	Skepta	Doin' It Again
"I'm Not the Man"	2011	Wretch 32, Angel	Black and White
"Notorious" (Remix)	2011	The Saturdays	Non-album remix
"Mayday"	2011	Tinie Tempah, Soulja Boy	Happy Birthday
"Real Nigga Shit"	2012	D.O.P.E.	Fly Therapy
"Be Cool Remix"	2012	Wretch 32, Wizzy Wow, Tinie Tempah, Scorcher, Bashy, Sway	Wretchrospective (Deluxe Edition)
"Action Man"	2012	Wretch 32, Scorcher, Sneakbo, Calibar	Wretchrospective (Deluxe Edition)
"I Got It"	2013	G Frsh, Sneakbo	Legoman, Vol. 2 (Where's My Brick?!)
"Err-Body"	2013	T.I., Young Dro, Trae tha Truth, B.o.B, Shad da God	Hustle Gang Presents: G.D.O.D. (Get Dough or Die)
"2 Fucks"	2013	T.I., B.o.B, Travis Scott, Trae tha Truth, Young Dro	Hustle Gang Presents: G.D.O.D. (Get Dough or Die)
"Young n' Reckless"	2013	Krept & Konan	Young Kingz
"Mercy"	2013	Ice Prince	Fire of Zamani
"Flying" (Zdot Remix)	2014	Wiley	Snakes & Ladders
"In2" (Remix)	2015	WSTRN, Wretch 32, Geko	Non-album remix
"Round and Round"	2016	Tanika	Out Here
"Corn on the Curb"	2016	Skepta, Wiley	Konnichiwa
"Smokin'" (Remix)	2016	Nafe Smallz, Black the Ripper	Non-album remixes
"Alarm" (Naughty Boy Remix)	2016	Anne-Marie	Non-album remixes
"Capri-Sun"	2016	AJ Tracey	Lil Tracey — EP
"On This"	2017	Wiley, Ice Kid, Little D	Godfather
"How I Like It" (Remix)	2017	D Double E, JME, Wiley, Lethal Bizzle, Baseman	Non-album remix
"High Spec"	2017	Skrapz	Different Cloth
"King of Hearts"	2017	Little Simz, Ghetts	Stillness in Wonderland
"Spaced Out"	2018	Nafe Smallz, Sleek	Movie Music
"If She Bad"	2018	Nafe Smallz	Movie Music
"Jumanji" (Remix)	2018	B Young, 23 Unofficial	Non-album remix
"Shellington Crescent"	2018	Ghetts	Ghetto Gospel: The New Testament
"En Route (Uber)"	2019	KYZE, Donae'o	Marathon
"Ringtone" (Remix)	2019	Dr. Vades, Loski, LD	Non-album remix
"Lil More"	2019	Nafe Smallz	Good Love
"Yard"	2019	Toddla T	Idris Elba Presents: The Yardie Mixtape
"Gimme Space"	2020	Cadet	The Rated Legend
"J LO"	2020	Nafe Smallz, Deno	Goat World
"Ying & Yang"	2020	GRM Daily, Deno	GRM 10
"Nonsense"	2020	NSG	Roots
"Old Money"	2023	Nafe Smallz	High Profile
"No More This Time"	2023	D-Block Europe	DBE World
"Eyes On Dem"	2024	Phyno	Full Time Job
"You're Beautiful"	2025	Marnz Malone	Sabr

== Music videos ==
=== As lead artist ===
Title	Year	Other artists	Director	Reference
"Who Are You?"	2008	None		
"Muhammad Ali"	2008	None		
"Beast"	2008	Loick Essien		
"Chip Diddy Chip"	2009		Vertex	
"Diamond Rings"	2009	Emeli Sandé	Vertex	
"Oopsy Daisy"	2009		—N/a	
"I Got Soul"	2009	Young Soul Rebels	—N/a	
"Look For Me"	2009	Talay Riley	—N/a	
"Until You Were Gone"	2010	Esmée Denters	—N/a	
"Superstar"	2010	Vertex	None	
"Flying High"	2010	Emil Nava	None	
"Champion"	2011	Colin Tilley	Chris Brown	
"In The Air"	2011	Colin Tilley	Keri Hilson	
"Every Gyal"	2011	Mavado	Vertex	
"Take Off"	2011	Trey Songz	Vertex	
"Londoner"	2012	Wretch 32, Professor Green, Loick Essien	Vertex	

=== As featured artist ===
Title	Year	Other artists	Director	Reference
"Defeat You"	2008	N-Dubz	Vertex	
"Tiny Dancer"	2009	Ironik, Elton John		
"She Likes To"	2009	Wiley, J2K, Wrigley, Ice-Kid, Wretch 32, Ghetts, Bashy, Scorcher, Griminal		
"Number One Enemy"	2010	Daisy Dares You		
"Game Over"	2010	Tinchy Stryder, Giggs, Professor Green, Tinie Tempah, Devlin, Example		
"Pow 2011"	2011	Lethal Bizzle, JME, Wiley, Face, P Money, Ghetts, Kano		
"Teardrop"	2011	The Collective, Wretch 32, Ed Sheeran, Labrinth, Tuilsa Contostavlos, Tinchy Stryder, Rizzle Kicks, Ms. Dynamite, Mz Bratt, Dot Rotten	Vertex and Ben Leinster	
