= List of UK top-ten singles in 2009 =

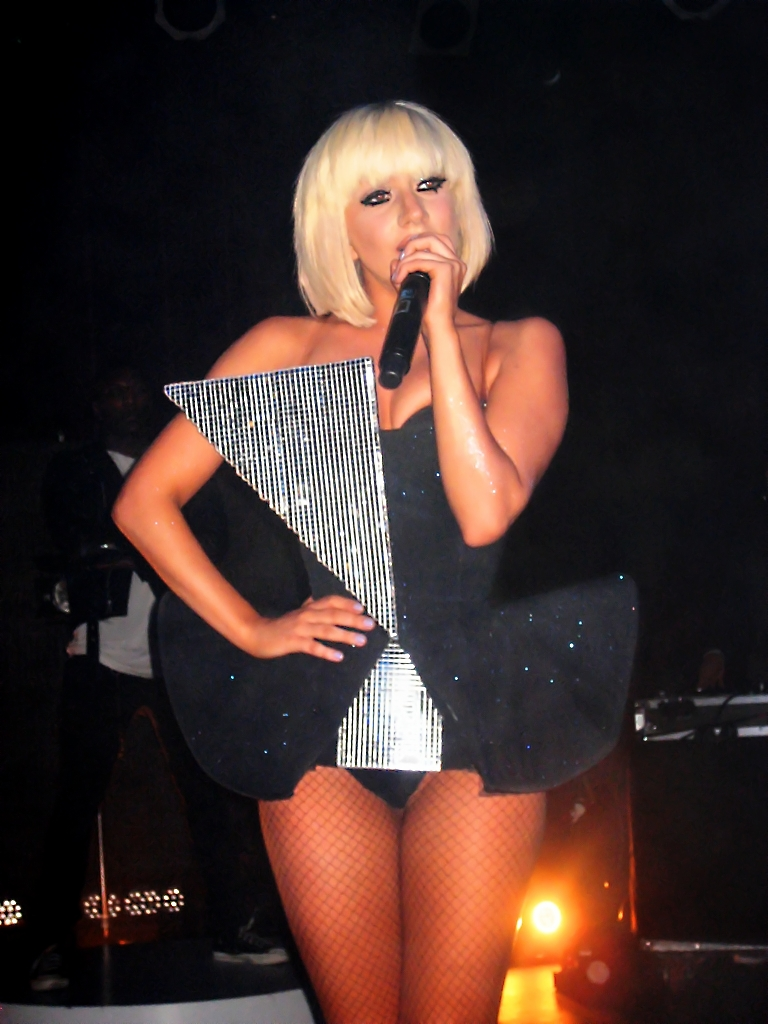
Lady Gaga made her arrival into the UK charts in 2009, achieving four top 10 hits, including three number-ones. "Poker Face" became the best-selling single of the year, topping the chart for three weeks.

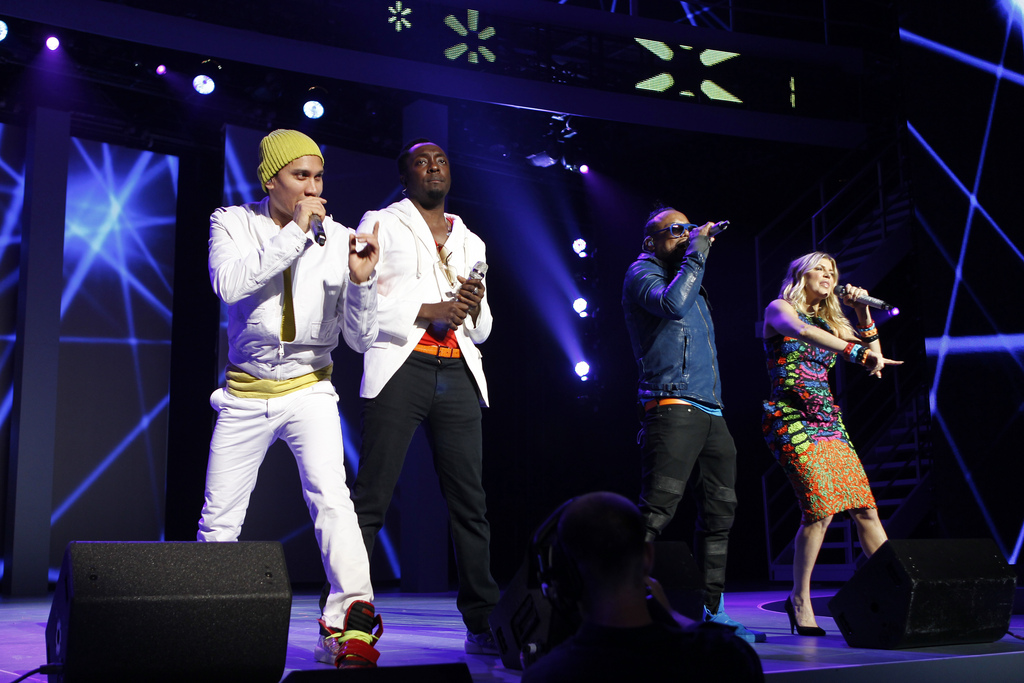
Black Eyed Peas also dominated the charts this year, scoring three top 10 entries. All of these reached number-one and finished in the top 10 of the year's best selling singles list. The most successful of these was "I Gotta Feeling", which spent two non-consecutive weeks at number-one and 17 weeks in the top 10 altogether. It ended up as the year's second best seller, and became the first single to sell over one million downloads in the UK.

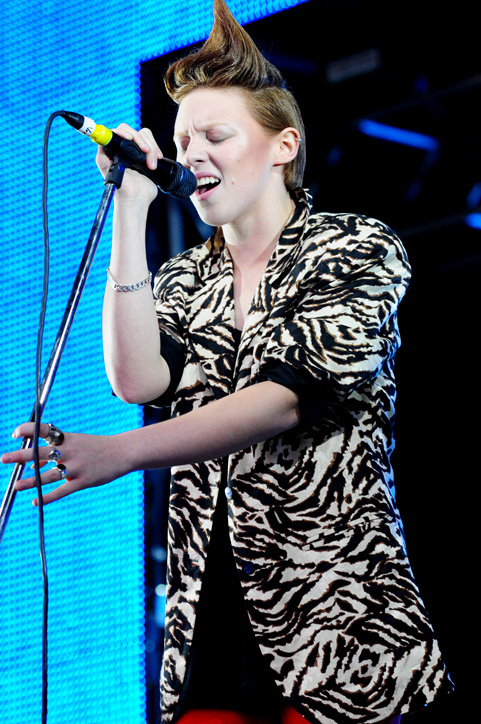
English synth-pop duo La Roux (lead singer Elly Jackson pictured) had two singles in the top 10 in 2009, including "Bulletproof", which reached number-one for one week.

The UK Singles Chart is one of many music charts compiled by the Official Charts Company that calculates the best-selling singles of the week in the United Kingdom. Since 2004 the chart has been based on the sales of both physical singles and digital downloads, with airplay figures excluded from the official chart. This list shows singles that peaked in the Top 10 of the UK Singles Chart during 2009, as well as singles which peaked in 2008 and 2010 but were in the top 10 in 2009. The entry date is when the song appeared in the top 10 for the first time (week ending, as published by the Official Charts Company, which is six days after the chart is announced).

One-hundred and twenty-nine singles were in the top ten in 2009. Eleven singles from 2008 remained in the top 10 for several weeks at the beginning of the year, while "TiK ToK" by Kesha, "Starstrukk" by 3OH!3 featuring Katy Perry, "Don't Stop Believing" by Journey, "Look for Me" by Chipmunk featuring Talay Riley, "The Climb" by Joe McElderry and "3 Words" by Cheryl featuring will.i.am were all released in 2009 but did not reach their peak until 2010. "Broken Strings" by James Morrison featuring Nelly Furtado was the only song from 2008 to reach its peak in 2009. Forty-three artists scored multiple entries in the top 10 in 2009. Emeli Sandé, Lady Gaga, Jason Derulo, Michael Bublé, Pixie Lott, Taylor Swift and Tinchy Stryder were among the many artists who achieved their first UK charting top 10 single in 2009.

The 2008 Christmas number-one, "Hallelujah" by X Factor series 5 winner Alexandra Burke, remained at number-one for the first week of 2009. The first new number-one single of the year was "Just Dance" by Lady Gaga. Overall, thirty-one different singles peaked at number-one in 2009, with Lady Gaga and Black Eyed Peas (3) both having the most singles hit that position.

== Background ==
One-hundred and twenty-nine singles charted in the top 10 in 2009, with one-hundred and twelve singles reaching their peak this year.

Forty-three artists scored multiple entries in the top 10 in 2009. Chipmunk secured the record for most top 10 hits in 2009 with five hit singles.

=== Chart debuts ===
Sixty-six artists achieved their first top 10 single in 2009, either as a lead or featured artist. Of these, four went on to record another hit single that year: Joe McElderry, Kesha, La Roux and Pitbull. N-Dubz and Pixie Lott had two more singles reach the top ten. Lady Gaga and Tinchy Stryder both scored three more top 10 singles in 2009. Chipmunk had four other entries in his breakthrough year.

The following table (collapsed on desktop site) does not include acts who had previously charted as part of a group and secured their first top 10 solo single.

Artist	Number of top 10s	First entry	Chart position	Other entries
Lady Gaga	4	"Just Dance"	1	"Poker Face" (1), "Paparazzi" (4), "Bad Romance" (1)
Colby O'Donis	1	"Just Dance"	1	—
Kevin Rudolf	1	"Let It Rock"	5	—
Kid Cudi	1	"Day 'n' Nite"	2	—
Crookers	1	"Day 'n' Nite"	2	—
Tinchy Stryder	4	"Take Me Back"	3	"I Got Soul", "Number 1" (1), "Never Leave You" (1)
Shontelle	1	"T-Shirt"	6	—
Taylor Swift	1	"Love Story"	2	—
Kesha	2	"Right Round"	1	"TiK ToK" (4) ^{[CC]}
Vanessa Jenkins	1	"(Barry) Islands in the Stream"	1	—
Bryn West	1	"(Barry) Islands in the Stream"	1	—
Noisettes	1	"Don't Upset the Rhythm (Go Baby Go)"	2	—
A.R. Rahman	1	"Jai Ho! (You Are My Destiny)"	3	—
Metro Station	1	"Shake It"	6	—
La Roux	2	"In for the Kill"	2	"Bulletproof" (1)
N-Dubz	3	"Number 1"	1	"I Got Soul", "I Need You" (5)
Chipmunk	5	"Tiny Dancer (Hold Me Closer)"	3	"Diamond Rings" (6), "I Got Soul" (10), "Oopsy Daisy" (1), "Look for Me" (7) ^{[EE]}
Sammie	1	"Kiss Me thru the Phone"	6	—
Alexander Rybak	1	"Fairytale"	10	—
Agnes	1	"Release Me"	3	—
The Veronicas	1	"Untouched"	8	—
Pixie Lott	3	"Mama Do (Uh Oh, Uh Oh)"	1	"Boys and Girls" (1), "I Got Soul" (10)
Emeli Sandé	1	"Diamond Rings"	6	—
Pitbull	2	"I Know You Want Me (Calle Ocho)"	4	"Hotel Room Service" (9)
Mr Hudson	1	"Supernova"	2	—
The Ian Carey Project	1	"Get Shaky"	9	—
Little Boots	1	"Remedy"	6	—
Esmée Denters	1	"Outta Here"	7	—
Mini Viva	1	"Left My Heart in Tokyo"	7	—
The Temper Trap	1	"Sweet Disposition"	6	—
Michael Bublé	1	"Haven't Met You Yet"	5	—
Young Soul Rebels	1	"I Got Soul"	10	—
Bashy	1	"I Got Soul"	10	—
Domino Go	1	"I Got Soul"	10	—
Egypt	1	"I Got Soul"	10	—
Frankmusik	1	"I Got Soul"	10	—
Kid British	1	"I Got Soul"	10	—
London Community Gospel Choir	1	"I Got Soul"	10	—
McLean	1	"I Got Soul"	10	—
Mpho	1	"I Got Soul"	10	—
VV Brown	1	"I Got Soul"	10	—
Chase & Status	1	"End Credits"	9	—
Plan B	1	"End Credits"	9	—
The X Factor Finalists 2009	1	"You Are Not Alone"	1	—
Danyl Johnson	1	"You Are Not Alone"	1	—
Jamie Archer	1	"You Are Not Alone"	1	—
Jedward	1	"You Are Not Alone"	1	—
Joe McElderry	2	"You Are Not Alone"	1	"The Climb" (1) ^{[DD]}
Kandy Rain	1	"You Are Not Alone"	1	—
Lloyd Daniels	1	"You Are Not Alone"	1	—
Lucie Jones	1	"You Are Not Alone"	1	—
Miss Frank	1	"You Are Not Alone"	1	—
Olly Murs	1	"You Are Not Alone"	1	—
Rachel Adedeji	1	"You Are Not Alone"	1	—
Rikki Loney	1	"You Are Not Alone"	1	—
Stacey Solomon	1	"You Are Not Alone"	1	—
Jason Derulo	1	"Whatcha Say"	3	—
Peter Kay's Animated All Star Band	1	"The Official BBC Children in Need Medley"	1	—
Susan Boyle	1	"Wild Horses"	9	—
Chuckie	1	"Let the Bass Kick in Miami Bitch"	9	—
LMFAO	1	"Let the Bass Kick in Miami Bitch"	9	—
Talay Riley	1	"Look for Me" ^{[EE]}	7	—
3OH!3	1	"Starstrukk" ^{[FF]}	3	—
Journey	1	"Don't Stop Believin'" ^{[GG]}	6	—

Notes

Amelle from Sugababes (who joined the group in 2005) had a solo hit with Tinchy Stryder on "Never Leave You". "Fight for This Love" was Cheryl Cole's debut single as a solo artist independent of Girls Aloud. The song reached number-one.

Young Soul Rebels was a charity super-group that recorded the song "I Got Soul" to raise money for War Child UK. Among the participants were Pixie Lott, VV Brown, N-Dubz, Tinchy Stryder, Frankmusik, Kid British, Ironik, Chip, McLean, MPHO, Bashy and the London Community Gospel Choir. Comedian Peter Kay had previous chart entries on "Is This the Way to Amarillo", "(I'm Gonna Be) 500 Miles" and as Geraldine McQueen but the Animated All Star Band was a new act to the chart.

Joe McElderry sang on "You Are Not Alone" with his fellow X Factor series six contestants prior to his debut solo hit "The Climb". Jedward and Olly Murs would both go on to record top 10 singles in later years. Although "Beat Again" was the first solo chart entry for JLS, they sang on "Hero" during their time on series 5 of The X Factor, which peaked at number-one in 2008.

=== Songs from films ===
Original songs from various films entered the top 10 throughout the year. These included "Jai Ho! (You Are My Destiny)" (from Slumdog Millionaire) and "Sweet Disposition" (500 Days of Summer). "The Climb" from Hannah Montana: The Movie was also covered by Joe McElderry as his winning song on The X Factor.

=== Charity singles ===
A number of singles recorded for charity reached the top 10 in the charts in 2009. The Comic Relief single was a cover version of Depeche Mode's "Just Can't Get Enough" by The Saturdays, peaking at number two on 14 March 2009 (week ending) after a performance on the telethon. A second single was released for Comic Relief, "(Barry) Islands in the Stream", a parody of "Islands in the Stream" by Kenny Rogers and Dolly Parton, and reached number-one for a single week. It was performed by Ruth Jones and Rob Brydon, as their characters from the British sitcom Gavin & Stacey, Vanessa Jenkins and Bryn West, and also featured Welsh singer Tom Jones and Robin Gibb from the Bee Gees.

A charity supergroup known as Young Soul Rebels, which included acts such as Pixie Lott, N-Dubz and Tinchy Stryder, peaked at number ten on 31 October 2009 (week ending) with "I Got Soul", an adapted version of "All These Things That I've Done" by The Killers. The song was raising money for War Child UK.

The finalists from the sixth series of The X Factor (which included winner Joe McElderry, Olly Murs and Jedward) got together for a single, "You Are Not Alone", which had been a hit for Michael Jackson. It reached number one on 28 November 2009 (week ending) with profits going to benefit Great Ormond Street Hospital.

The Children in Need single for 2009 was created by comedian Peter Kay. His 'All Star Animated Band' featured British children's cartoon characters including Bob the Builder, Fireman Sam and Postman Pat. The song, "The Official BBC Children in Need Medley", comprised a mashup of covers of seven popular songs: in order, "Can You Feel It", "Don't Stop", "Jai Ho!", "Tubthumping", "Never Forget", "Hey Jude" and "One Day Like This". It reached number one on 5 December 2009 (week ending).

=== Best-selling singles ===
Lady Gaga had the best-selling single of the year with "Poker Face". The song spent thirteen weeks in the top 10 (including three weeks at number one), sold over 882,000 copies and was certified platinum by the BPI. "I Gotta Feeling" by Black Eyed Peas came in second place, selling more than 848,000 copies and losing out by around 24,000 sales. Lady Gaga featuring Colby O'Donis's "Just Dance, "Fight for This Love" from Cheryl Cole and "The Climb" by Joe McElderry made up the top five. Singles by La Roux, Black Eyed Peas ("Boom Boom Pow"), Rage Against the Machine, Alexandra Burke featuring Flo Rida and Black Eyed Peas ("Meet Me Halfway") were also in the top ten best-selling singles of the year.

== Top-ten singles ==
Key

Symbol	Meaning
‡	Single peaked in 2008 but still in chart in 2009.
♦	Single released in 2009 but peaked in 2010.
(#)	Year-end top ten single position and rank
Entered	The date that the single first appeared in the chart.
Peak	Highest position that the single reached in the UK Singles Chart.

Entered (week ending)	Weeks in top 10	Single	Artist	Peak	Peak reached (week ending)	Weeks at peak
Singles in 2008
20 September 2008	9	"Sex on Fire" ‡ ^{[A]}	Kings of Leon	1	20 September 2008	3
1 November 2008	11	"Hot n Cold" ‡	Katy Perry	4	13 December 2008	1
15 November 2008	10	"If I Were a Boy" ‡	Beyoncé	1	29 November 2008	1
15 November 2008	8	"Womanizer" ‡	Britney Spears	3	13 December 2008	1
22 November 2008	7	"Human" ‡	The Killers	3	29 November 2008	1
6 December 2008	6	"Greatest Day" ‡	Take That	1	6 December 2008	1
13 December 2008	7	"Run" ‡	Leona Lewis	1	13 December 2008	2
13 December 2008	13	"Use Somebody" ‡	Kings of Leon	2	20 December 2008	1
27 December 2008	5	"Hallelujah" ‡	Alexandra Burke	1	27 December 2008	3
27 December 2008	2	"Hallelujah" ‡	Jeff Buckley	2	27 December 2008	1
27 December 2008	2	"Once Upon a Christmas Song" ‡	Geraldine McQueen	5	27 December 2008	1
27 December 2008	10	"Broken Strings"	James Morrison featuring Nelly Furtado	2	17 January 2009	1
Singles in 2009
10 January 2009	10	"Just Dance" (#3)	Lady Gaga featuring Colby O'Donis	1	17 January 2009	3
17 January 2009	4	"Issues"	The Saturdays	4	24 January 2009	1
17 January 2009	3	"Let It Rock"	Kevin Rudolf featuring Lil Wayne	5	24 January 2009	1
17 January 2009	7	"Single Ladies (Put a Ring on It)"	Beyoncé	7	24 January 2009	3
24 January 2009	5	"Day 'n' Nite"	Kid Cudi vs. Crookers	2	24 January 2009	2
24 January 2009	1	"The Loving Kind"	Girls Aloud	10	24 January 2009	1
31 January 2009	4	"Take Me Back"	Tinchy Stryder featuring Taio Cruz	3	31 January 2009	2
31 January 2009	1	"Sober"	Pink	9	31 January 2009	1
31 January 2009	1	"Heartless"	Kanye West	10	31 January 2009	1
7 February 2009	6	"The Fear"	Lily Allen	1	7 February 2009	4
7 February 2009	5	"Breathe Slow"	Alesha Dixon	3	21 February 2009	1
14 February 2009	3	"Crack a Bottle"	Eminem featuring Dr. Dre & 50 Cent	4	14 February 2009	2
14 February 2009	1	"Change"	Daniel Merriweather	8	14 February 2009	1
21 February 2009	2	"Omen"	The Prodigy	4	28 February 2009	1
21 February 2009	4	"T-Shirt"	Shontelle	6	28 February 2009	1
28 February 2009	3	"Whatcha Think About That"	The Pussycat Dolls featuring Missy Elliott	9	7 March 2009	1
7 March 2009	5	"My Life Would Suck Without You"	Kelly Clarkson	1	7 March 2009	1
7 March 2009	7	"Love Story"	Taylor Swift	2	7 March 2009	1
7 March 2009	13	"Poker Face" (#1)	Lady Gaga	1	28 March 2009	3
7 March 2009	6	"Dead and Gone"	T.I. featuring Justin Timberlake	4	7 March 2009	1
14 March 2009	6	"Right Round"	Flo Rida featuring Kesha	1	14 March 2009	1
14 March 2009	3	"Just Can't Get Enough" ^{[B]}	The Saturdays	2	14 March 2009	1
21 March 2009	2	"(Barry) Islands in the Stream" ^{[B]}	Vanessa Jenkins & Bryn West featuring Tom Jones & Robin Gibb	1	21 March 2009	1
21 March 2009	4	"Beautiful"	Akon featuring Colby O'Donis & Kardinal Offishall	8	28 March 2009	2
21 March 2009	1	"Falling Down"	Oasis	10	21 March 2009	1
28 March 2009	8	"Halo"	Beyoncé	4	4 April 2009	1
4 April 2009	5	"Don't Upset the Rhythm (Go Baby Go)"	Noisettes	2	4 April 2009	2
4 April 2009	7	"Jai Ho! (You Are My Destiny)"	A.R. Rahman & The Pussycat Dolls featuring Nicole Scherzinger	3	11 April 2009	2
4 April 2009	4	"Shake It"	Metro Station	6	11 April 2009	1
11 April 2009	10	"In for the Kill" (#6)	La Roux	2	25 April 2009	4
18 April 2009	6	"I'm Not Alone"	Calvin Harris	1	18 April 2009	2
18 April 2009	6	"Love Sex Magic"	Ciara featuring Justin Timberlake	5	25 April 2009	1
25 April 2009	7	"We Made You"	Eminem	4	23 May 2009	2
25 April 2009	7	"Not Fair"	Lily Allen	5	23 May 2009	1
2 May 2009	7	"Number 1"	Tinchy Stryder featuring N-Dubz	1	2 May 2009	3
9 May 2009	3	"Tiny Dancer (Hold Me Closer)"	Ironik featuring Chipmunk & Elton John	3	9 May 2009	2
23 May 2009	9	"Boom Boom Pow" (#7)	Black Eyed Peas	1	23 May 2009	2
23 May 2009	1	"Warrior's Dance"	The Prodigy	9	23 May 2009	1
30 May 2009	6	"Bonkers"	Dizzee Rascal & Armand van Helden	1	30 May 2009	2
30 May 2009	6	"Red"	Daniel Merriweather	5	30 May 2009	4
30 May 2009	4	"Kiss Me thru the Phone"	Soulja Boy Tell'em featuring Sammie	6	6 June 2009	1
30 May 2009	1	"Fairytale"	Alexander Rybak	10	30 May 2009	1
6 June 2009	7	"Release Me"	Agnes	3	6 June 2009	2
6 June 2009	5	"Untouched"	The Veronicas	8	6 June 2009	1
13 June 2009	2	"Fire"	Kasabian	3	13 June 2009	1
13 June 2009	6	"Knock You Down"	Keri Hilson featuring Kanye West & Ne-Yo	5	27 June 2009	2
20 June 2009	4	"Mama Do (Uh Oh, Uh Oh)"	Pixie Lott	1	20 June 2009	1
20 June 2009	8	"When Love Takes Over"	David Guetta featuring Kelly Rowland	1	27 June 2009	1
27 June 2009	8	"Paparazzi"	Lady Gaga	4	4 July 2009	2
27 June 2009	1	"Said It All"	Take That	9	27 June 2009	1
4 July 2009	7	"Bulletproof"	La Roux	1	4 July 2009	1
11 July 2009	6	"Evacuate the Dancefloor"	Cascada	1	11 July 2009	2
11 July 2009	3	"Man in the Mirror" ^{[C]}	Michael Jackson	2	11 July 2009	1
11 July 2009	1	"Billie Jean" ^{[D]}	Michael Jackson	10	11 July 2009	1
18 July 2009	2	"Diamond Rings"	Chipmunk featuring Emeli Sandé	6	18 July 2009	1
18 July 2009	17	"I Gotta Feeling" (#2)	Black Eyed Peas	1	8 August 2009	2
25 July 2009	5	"Beat Again"	JLS	1	25 July 2009	2
25 July 2009	3	"Poppiholla"	Chicane	7	25 July 2009	1
25 July 2009	5	"I Know You Want Me (Calle Ocho)"	Pitbull	4	8 August 2009	1
1 August 2009	6	"Supernova"	Mr Hudson featuring Kanye West	2	1 August 2009	1
1 August 2009	7	"Sweet Dreams"	Beyoncé	5	15 August 2009	3
15 August 2009	5	"Never Leave You"	Tinchy Stryder featuring Amelle	1	15 August 2009	1
15 August 2009	3	"Get Shaky"	The Ian Carey Project	9	22 August 2009	1
22 August 2009	3	"Ready for the Weekend"	Calvin Harris	3	22 August 2009	1
22 August 2009	2	"Behind Closed Doors"	Peter Andre	4	22 August 2009	1
22 August 2009	5	"Remedy"	Little Boots	6	29 August 2009	2
29 August 2009	9	"Sexy Chick"	David Guetta featuring Akon	1	29 August 2009	1
29 August 2009	3	"Outta Here"	Esmée Denters	7	29 August 2009	1
5 September 2009	5	"Holiday"	Dizzee Rascal	1	5 September 2009	1
5 September 2009	1	"That Golden Rule"	Biffy Clyro	10	5 September 2009	1
12 September 2009	6	"Run This Town"	Jay-Z featuring Rihanna & Kanye West	1	12 September 2009	1
12 September 2009	3	"Get Sexy"	Sugababes	2	12 September 2009	1
19 September 2009	4	"Boys and Girls"	Pixie Lott	1	19 September 2009	1
19 September 2009	1	"We Are Golden"	Mika	4	19 September 2009	1
19 September 2009	3	"Left My Heart In Tokyo"	Mini Viva	7	19 September 2009	1
19 September 2009	1	"Uprising"	Muse	9	19 September 2009	1
26 September 2009	6	"Break Your Heart"	Taio Cruz	1	26 September 2009	3
26 September 2009	2	"Celebration"	Madonna	3	26 September 2009	1
26 September 2009	5	"She Wolf"	Shakira	4	3 October 2009	2
3 October 2009	5	"Empire State of Mind"	Jay-Z featuring Alicia Keys	2	10 October 2009	1
10 October 2009	2	"Sweet Disposition"	The Temper Trap	6	17 October 2009	1
10 October 2009	2	"Hotel Room Service"	Pitbull	9	10 October 2009	2
10 October 2009	1	"Dirtee Cash"	Dizzee Rascal	10	10 October 2009	1
17 October 2009	4	"Oopsy Daisy"	Chipmunk	1	17 October 2009	1
17 October 2009	2	"Forever Is Over"	The Saturdays	2	17 October 2009	1
24 October 2009	5	"Bad Boys" (#9)	Alexandra Burke featuring Flo Rida	1	24 October 2009	1
24 October 2009	3	"Bodies"	Robbie Williams	2	24 October 2009	1
24 October 2009	4	"Haven't Met You Yet"	Michael Bublé	5	7 November 2009	1
31 October 2009	7	"Fight for This Love" (#4)	Cheryl Cole	1	31 October 2009	2
31 October 2009	2	"Million Dollar Bill"	Whitney Houston	5	31 October 2009	1
31 October 2009	1	"I Got Soul"	Young Soul Rebels	10	31 October 2009	1
7 November 2009	2	"What About Now"	Westlife	2	7 November 2009	1
7 November 2009	3	"Down"	Jay Sean featuring Lil Wayne	3	7 November 2009	1
7 November 2009	11	"Meet Me Halfway" (#10)	Black Eyed Peas	1	21 November 2009	1
14 November 2009	3	"Everybody in Love"	JLS	1	14 November 2009	1
14 November 2009	9	"TiK ToK" ♦	Kesha	4	9 January 2010	1
14 November 2009	1	"End Credits"	Chase & Status featuring Plan B	9	14 November 2009	1
14 November 2009	11	"Bad Romance" ^{[E]}	Lady Gaga	1	19 December 2009	2
21 November 2009	3	"Happy"	Leona Lewis	2	21 November 2009	1
21 November 2009	2	"I Need You"	N-Dubz	5	21 November 2009	1
21 November 2009	2	"3"	Britney Spears	7	21 November 2009	1
21 November 2009	1	"About a Girl"	Sugababes	8	21 November 2009	1
28 November 2009	3	"You Are Not Alone"	The X Factor Finalists 2009	1	28 November 2009	1
28 November 2009	4	"Whatcha Say"	Jason Derulo	3	28 November 2009	1
5 December 2009	4	"The Official BBC Children in Need Medley" ^{[F]}	Peter Kay's Animated All Star Band	1	5 December 2009	2
5 December 2009	6	"Russian Roulette"	Rihanna	2	12 December 2009	1
5 December 2009	1	"Wild Horses"	Susan Boyle	9	5 December 2009	1
12 December 2009	2	"Doesn't Mean Anything"	Alicia Keys	8	12 December 2009	2
12 December 2009	2	"Morning After Dark"	Timbaland featuring Nelly Furtado & SoShy	6	19 December 2009	1
19 December 2009	1	"Let the Bass Kick in Miami Girl"	Chuckie & LMFAO	9	19 December 2009	1
19 December 2009	3	"Look for Me" ♦	Chipmunk featuring Talay Riley	7	16 January 2010	1
26 December 2009	2	"Killing in the Name" (#8)	Rage Against the Machine	1	26 December 2009	1
26 December 2009	3	"The Climb" ♦ (#5)	Joe McElderry	1	2 January 2010	1
26 December 2009	10	"Starstrukk" ♦	3OH!3 featuring Katy Perry	3	16 January 2010	1
26 December 2009	3	"You Know Me"	Robbie Williams	6	26 December 2009	1
26 December 2009	3	"3 Words" ♦	Cheryl Cole featuring will.i.am	4	2 January 2010	1
26 December 2009	8	"Don't Stop Believin'" ♦	Journey	6	16 January 2010	2

== Entries by artist ==
The following table shows artists who achieved two or more top 10 entries in 2009, including singles that reached their peak in 2008 or 2010. The figures include both main artists and featured artists, while appearances on ensemble charity records are also counted for each artist. The total number of weeks an artist spent in the top ten in 2009 is also shown.

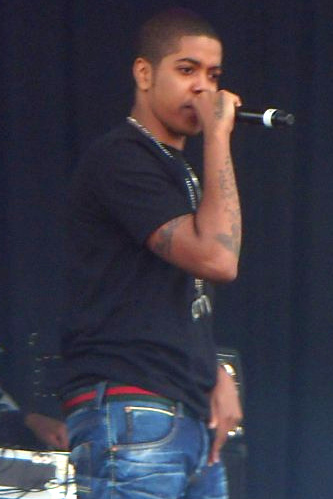
London-born rapper Chipmunk had five top 10 singles this year, the most of any artist. The highest-charting of these was "Oopsy Daisy", which debuted at number-one in October.

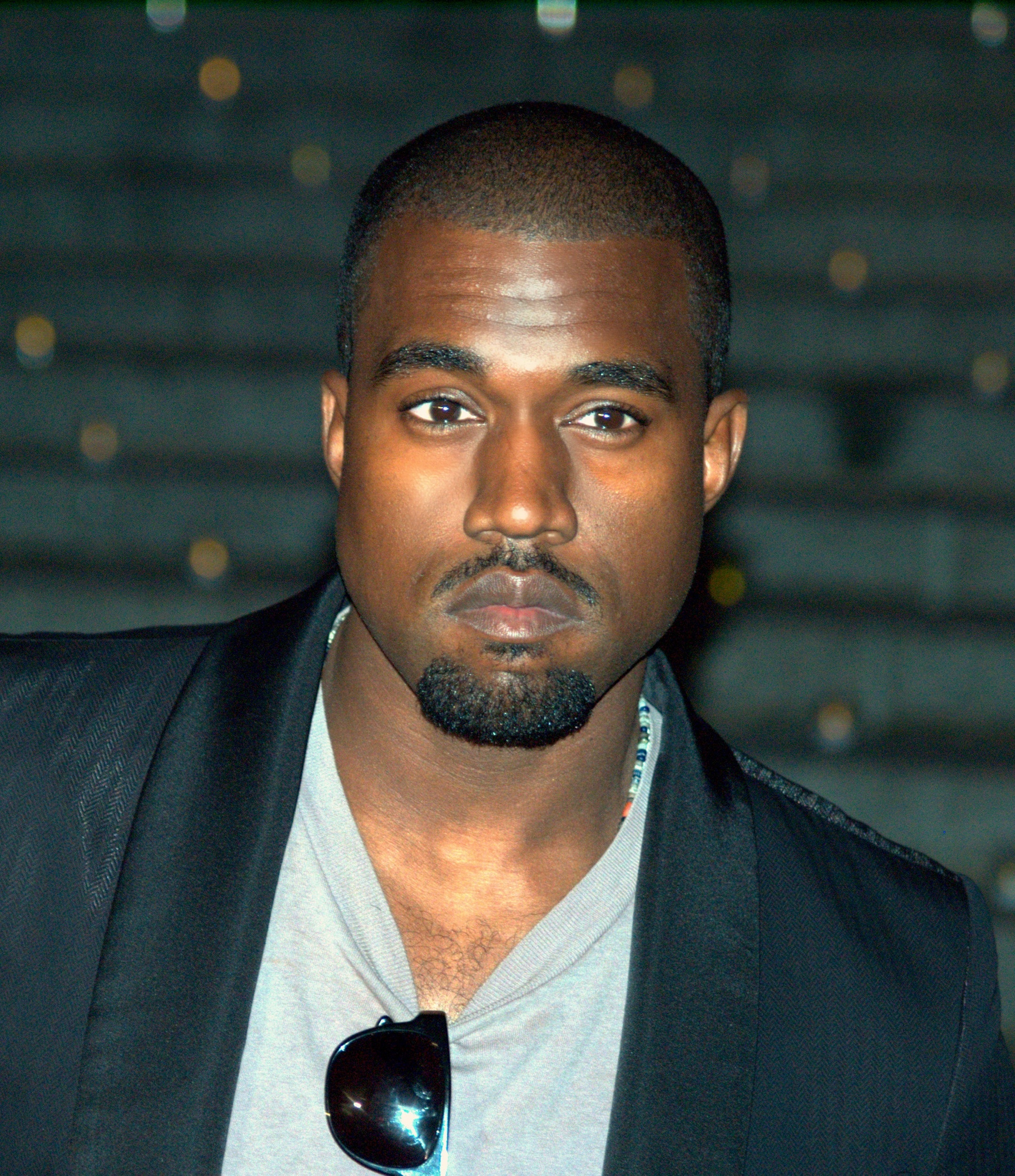
Kanye West had four top 10 hits during 2009, the most successful of which was his feature on Jay-Z's "Run This Town", which topped the chart for one week in September.

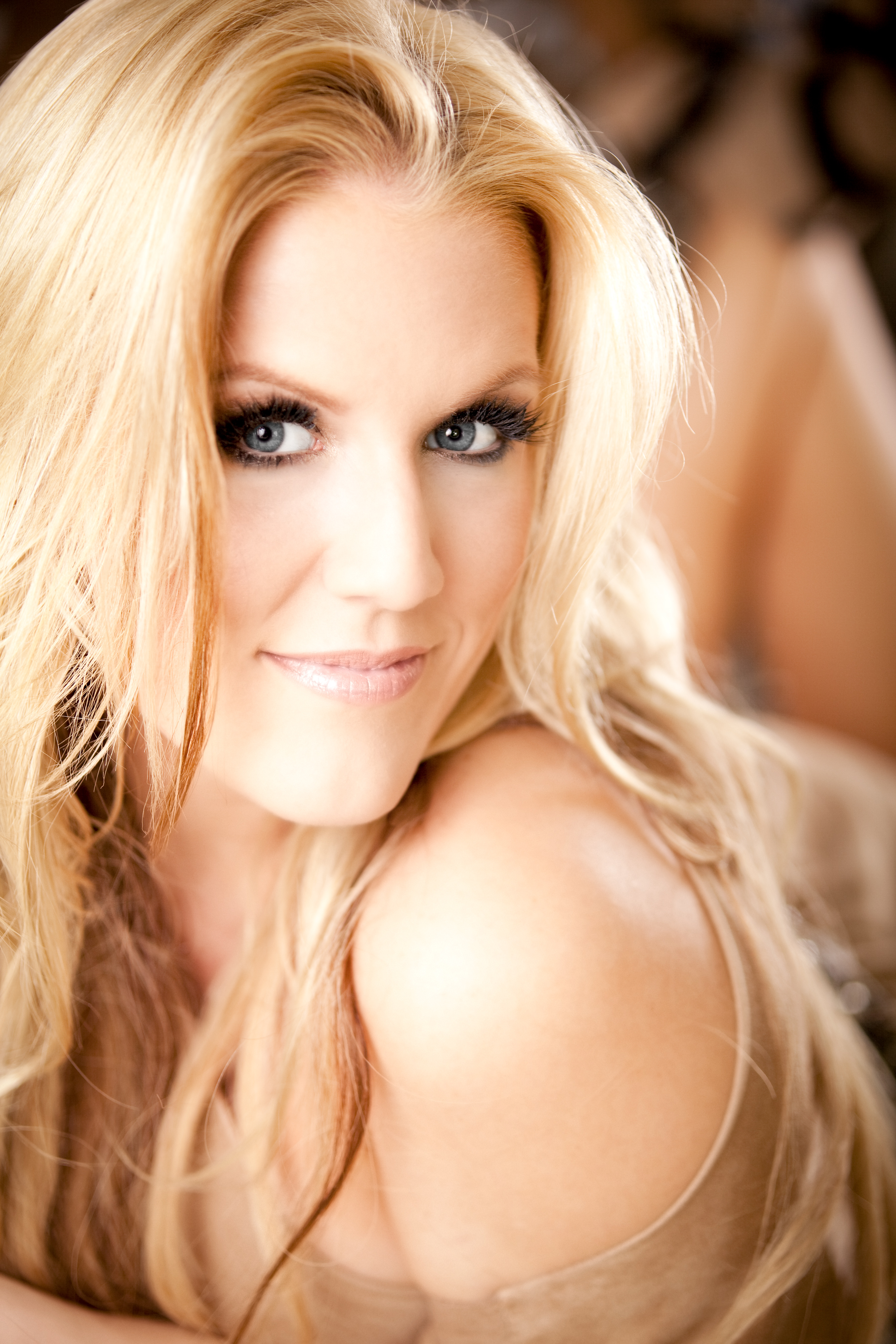
German dance group Cascada (lead singer Natalie Horler pictured) scored their highest-charting UK single this year with "Evacuate the Dancefloor", which reached number-one for two weeks in July.

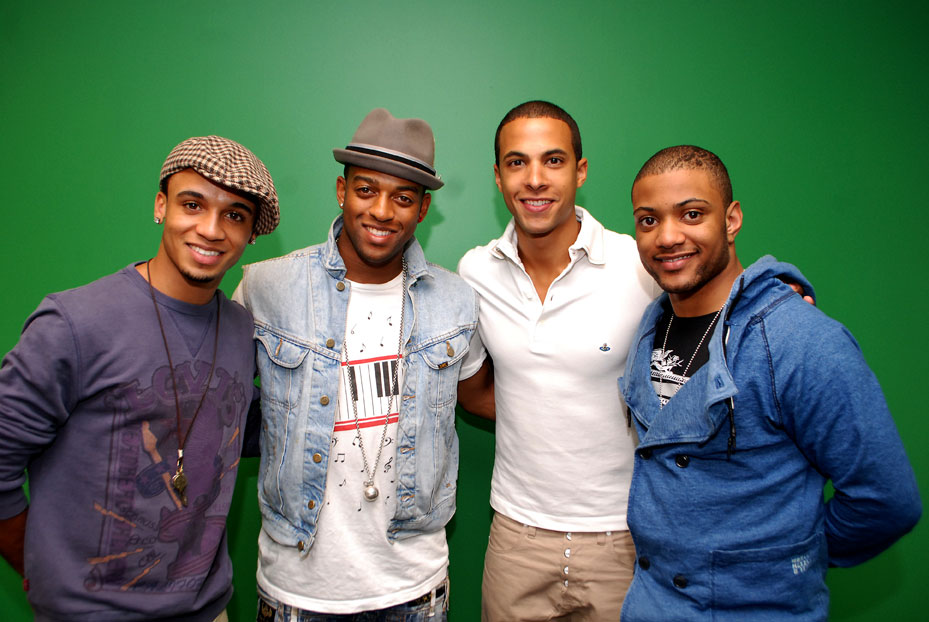
JLS, who finished as runners-up in the fifth series of The X Factor, reached number-one in July 2009 with their debut single "Beat Again". The follow-up, "Everybody in Love", also topped the chart in November.

Entries	Artist	Weeks	Singles
5	Chipmunk ^{[G]}^{[H]}^{[L]}	12	"Diamond Rings", "I Got Soul", "Look for Me", "Oopsy Daisy", "Tiny Dancer (Hold Me Closer)"
4	Beyoncé ^{[K]}	23	"Halo", "If I Were a Boy", "Single Ladies (Put a Ring on It)", "Sweet Dreams"
4	Kanye West ^{[I]}	19	"Heartless", "Knock You Down", "Run This Town", "Supernova"
4	Lady Gaga	38	"Just Dance", "Paparazzi", "Poker Face", "Bad Romance"
4	Tinchy Stryder ^{[G]}	17	"I Got Soul", "Never Leave You", "Number 1", "Take Me Back"
4	will.i.am ^{[N]}^{[Q]}	38	"3 Words", "Boom Boom Pow", "I Gotta Feeling", "Meet Me Halfway"
3	Amelle Berrabah ^{[R]}	9	"About a Girl", "Never Leave You", "Get Sexy"
3	Black Eyed Peas	37	"Boom Boom Pow", "I Gotta Feeling", "Meet Me Halfway"
3	Cheryl Cole ^{[L]}^{[M]}	9	"3 Words", "Fight for This Love", "The Loving Kind"
3	Dizzee Rascal	12	"Bonkers", "Dirtee Cash", "Holiday"
3	N-Dubz ^{[G]}^{[J]}	10	"I Got Soul", "I Need You", "Number 1"
3	Pixie Lott ^{[G]}	9	"Boys and Girls", "I Got Soul", "Mama Do (Uh Oh, Uh Oh)"
3	The Saturdays	9	"Forever Is Over", "Issues", "Just Can't Get Enough"
2	Akon ^{[S]}	13	"Beautiful", "Sexy Chick"
2	Alexandra Burke ^{[K]}	9	"Bad Boys", "Hallelujah"
2	Alicia Keys ^{[T]}	7	"Doesn't Mean Anything", "Empire State of Mind"
2	Britney Spears ^{[K]}	3	"3", "Womanizer"
2	Calvin Harris	9	"I'm Not Alone", "Ready for the Weekend"
2	Daniel Merriweather	7	"Change", "Red"
2	David Guetta	17	"Sexy Chick", "When Love Takes Over"
2	Eminem	10	"Crack a Bottle", "We Made You"
2	Flo Rida ^{[U]}	11	"Bad Boys", "Right Round"
2	Ironik ^{[G]}	4	"I Got Soul", "Tiny Dancer (Hold Me Closer)"
2	Jay-Z	11	"Empire State of Mind", "Run This Town"
2	JLS	8	"Beat Again", "Everybody in Love"
2	Joe McElderry ^{[K]}^{[P]}	4	"The Climb", "You Are Not Alone"
2	Justin Timberlake ^{[T]}	13	"Dead and Gone", "Love Sex Magic"
2	Katy Perry ^{[K]}^{[L]}^{[W]}	4	"Hot n Cold", "Starstrukk"
2	Kesha ^{[L]}^{[X]}	13	"Right Round", "TiK ToK"
2	Kings of Leon ^{[K]}	11	"Sex on Fire", "Use Somebody"
2	La Roux	17	"Bulletproof", "In for the Kill"
2	Leona Lewis ^{[K]}	7	"Happy", "Run"
2	Lil Wayne ^{[Y]}	6	"Down", "Let It Rock"
2	Lily Allen	13	"The Fear", "Not Fair"
2	Michael Jackson	4	"Billie Jean", "Man in the Mirror"
2	Nelly Furtado ^{[K]}	11	"Broken Strings", "Morning After Dark"
2	Nicole Scherzinger ^{[O]}^{[Z]}	10	"Jai Ho! (You Are My Destiny)", "Whatcha Think About That"
2	Pitbull	7	"Hotel Room Service", "I Know You Want Me (Calle Ocho)"
2	The Prodigy	3	"Omen", "Warrior's Dance"
2	The Pussycat Dolls	10	"Jai Ho! (You Are My Destiny)", "Whatcha Think About That"
2	Rihanna ^{[AA]}	10	"Run This Town", "Russian Roulette"
2	Robbie Williams	4	"Bodies", "You Know Me"
2	Sugababes	4	"About a Girl", "Get Sexy"
2	Taio Cruz ^{[BB]}	10	"Break Your Heart", "Take Me Back"
2	Take That ^{[K]}	3	"Greatest Day", "Said It All"

== Notes ==
- ^{a} "Sex on Fire" re-entered the top 10 at number 6 on 12 September 2009 (week ending) after a performance of the song by Jamie Archer on The X Factor.
- ^{b} Released as the official single for Comic Relief.
- ^{c} Originally peaked at number 21 in 1988 but peaked at number 2 following the death of Michael Jackson.
- ^{d} Originally peaked at number 1 in February 1983 but returned to the Top 10 at number 10 following the death of Michael Jackson.
- ^{e} "Bad Romance" re-entered the top 10 at number 8 on 28 November 2009.
- ^{f} Released as the official single for Children in Need.
- ^{g} Figure includes an appearance on the charity single "I Got Soul" by the collective known as The Young Soul Rebels.
- ^{h} Figure includes appearance on Ironik's "Hold Me Closer".
- ^{i} Figure includes appearances on Keri Hilson's "Knock You Down", Mr Hudson's "Supernova" and Jay-Z's "Run This Town".
- ^{j} Figure includes appearance on Tinchy Stryder's "Number 1".
- ^{k} Figure includes song that peaked in 2008.
- ^{l} Figure includes song that peaked in 2010.
- ^{m} Figure includes single as part of Girls Aloud.
- ^{n} Figure includes three singles with the group The Black Eyed Peas.
- ^{o} Figure includes single with the group Pussycat Dolls.
- ^{p} Figure includes appearance on "You Are Not Alone" as part of The X Factor UK 2009 finalists.
- ^{q} Figure includes appearance on Cheryl Cole's "3 Words".
- ^{r} Figure includes appearance on Tinchy Stryder's "Never Leave You".
- ^{s} Figure includes appearance on David Guetta's "Sexy Chick".
- ^{t} Figure includes appearance on Jay-Z's "Empire State of Mind".
- ^{u} Figure includes appearance on Alexandra Burke's "Bad Boys".
- ^{v} Figure includes appearances on T.I.'s "Dead and Gone" and Ciara's "Love Sex Magic".
- ^{w} Figure includes appearance on 3OH!3's "Starstrukk".
- ^{x} Figure includes appearance on Flo Rida's "Right Round".
- ^{y} Figure includes appearances on Jay Sean's "Down" and Kevin Rudolf's "Let It Rock".
- ^{z} Figure includes appearance on A.R. Rahman & The Pussycat Dolls' "Jai Ho! (You are My Destiny)".
- ^{aa} Figure includes appearance on Jay-Z's "Run This Town".
- ^{bb} Figure includes appearance on Tinchy Stryder's "Take Me Back".
- ^{cc} "TiK ToK" reached its peak of number four on 9 January 2010 (week ending).
- ^{dd} "The Climb" reached its peak of number one on 2 January 2010 (week ending).
- ^{ee} "Look for Me" reached its peak of number seven on 16 January 2010 (week ending).
- ^{ff} "Starstrukk" reached its peak of number three on 16 January 2010 (week ending).
- ^{gg} "Don't Stop Believin'" reached its peak of number six on 16 January 2010 (week ending).

== See also ==
- 2009 in British music
