= 2009 in British music charts =

This is a summary of the year 2009 in British music charts. 31 singles have occupied the number-one spot including 15 new entries. Due to the increase in downloads over physical sales, singles now tend to enter the chart at a lower position, before climbing to the top a few weeks later: a trend which was previously rarely seen in the later half of the 1990s and most of the 2000s.

== Summary of UK chart activity ==
=== January ===
Alexandra Burke's "Hallelujah", the Christmas number-one single of 2008, remained at the top of the Singles Chart for a third week on 4 January. One week later, however, American singer-songwriter Lady Gaga's debut single "Just Dance" went to number one, and stayed there for the remainder of the month. Elsewhere in January, Girls Aloud scored their twentieth consecutive top ten single with "The Loving Kind", while Beyoncé returned to the top ten with "Single Ladies (Put a Ring on It)", the second single from her I Am... Sasha Fierce album. American rapper Kid Cudi made his top ten debut with "Day 'n' Nite" which peaked at number two, whilst The Saturdays' third single "Issues" peaked at number four.

Kings of Leon's Only by the Night album, which spent two weeks at number one in 2008, returned to the top of the Albums Chart on 11 January on the strength of their recent single "Use Somebody", while The Script's eponymous debut album – another number one of last year – also returned to the peak of the chart. Indie rock band White Lies scored their first number one album when debut LP To Lose My Life... topped the charts on 25 January, while Lady Gaga's debut album The Fame entered at number three.

=== February ===
Lady Gaga finally got knocked off the number one spot by Lily Allen, who scored her second number one with "The Fear". ending Lady Gaga's three-week reign at the top. Alesha Dixon's second single, "Breathe Slow" from her album The Alesha Show climbed up to number six, two weeks before its CD release. It finally climbed up to number three two weeks later, her highest peaking solo hit.

White Lies got knocked off from the number one album spot by Bruce Springsteen with his new album, Working on a Dream. Franz Ferdinand's third album, Tonight, missed out at number two. Bruce Springsteen kept number one for another week, whilst The View's second album Which Bitch? entered at number four.

Rapper Eminem returned with "Crack a Bottle", which entered the singles chart at number four on downloads alone, his first hit in four years. This month also saw the re-entry of M.I.A. with her song "Paper Planes" due to the multi-BAFTA-winning film Slumdog Millionaire. The lead single from the first The Prodigy album in five years, "Omen", peaked at number four on the singles chart.

=== March ===
Kelly Clarkson, the winner of the first series of American Idol, scored her first UK number one single on 1 March with "My Life Would Suck Without You", the lead single from her fourth studio album All I Ever Wanted. Teenage country/pop singer Taylor Swift jumped 20 places to number two with "Love Story". Kelly Clarkson then got knocked down to number four by Flo Rida with "Right Round" who prevented The Saturdays from getting number one with "Just Can't Get Enough" which was the first time in 14 years that the Comic Relief song did not hit number one. The second Comic Relief song, "Barry Islands in the Stream" got to number one a week later and a week after that it got knocked off by Lady Gaga who gained a surprise second number one with "Poker Face". On 29 March, Noisettes entered the top forty for the first time with "Don't Upset The Rhythm (Go Baby Go)" at number two, Pussycat Dolls' new single "Jai Ho! (You Are My Destiny)" with A.R. Rahman climbed to number five and "Halo" by Beyoncé got to number four.

Kings of Leon got knocked off from the number one album spot by The Prodigy with their first studio album in five years, Invaders Must Die. The Prodigy then got knocked off from number one by U2 with their first album in five years, No Line on the Horizon which outsold the rest of the top forty combined to claim the top spot. U2 kept the top spot the next week whilst Kelly Clarkson's album All I Ever Wanted went straight in at number four and Annie Lennox got to number two with The Annie Lennox Collection. On Mother's Day week Ronan Keating topped the albums chart with Songs for My Mother, while Annie Lennox stayed at number two.

=== April ===
On the first chart of April, Lady Gaga stayed at number one on the singles chart with "Poker Face" which went on to become the UK's biggest-selling single of 2009. Metro Station's debut song "Shake It" climbed to number six and La Roux's song "In for the Kill" climbed up into the top ten after a fortnight at number eleven, reaching number seven. The next week La Roux climbed higher to number four, Calvin Harris knocked Lady Gaga off the top with "I'm Not Alone" and Ciara's new single, "Love Sex Magic" with Justin Timberlake entered at number six. On 19 April, Calvin Harris stayed at number one for a second week with "I'm Not Alone". La Roux climbed 2 places to number two, knocking Lady Gaga to number three, and Pussycat Dolls to number four. Eminem gained the highest new entry with "We Made You". On 26 April the aptly titled "Number 1" by Tinchy Stryder and N-Dubz went straight in at number one. Curiously, despite 23 releases since chart records began, no other single has ever reached number one, referencing its chart position in the title. They saw off competition from La Roux, who was a non-mover at 2 whilst Calvin Harris dropped two places to number 3. Climbers included Eminem who rose three places to 5 and Lily Allen rose one place to 9. Lady Gaga however dropped one place to number 4 and Ciara Feat. Justin Timberlake also slightly dropped.

On the first albums chart of the month, Lady Gaga finally climbed to number one with The Fame, knocking off Ronan Keating with Songs for My Mother and Flo Rida's second album R.O.O.T.S. debuted at number five, becoming his highest charting album to date. The next week Lady Gaga kept number one with new albums from Doves at number two and Bat for Lashes with Two Suns at number five. On 26 April, Lady Gaga kept her reign over the albums chart keeping her album "The Fame" at the summit for a month despite heavy competition from Depeche Mode.

=== May ===
On the first chart of May, the top two remained static, whilst at three, pushing Lady Gaga and Calvin Harris down one each, was Ironik and Chipmunk's remix of Elton John's "Tiny Dancer". Girls Aloud only managed to climb to number eleven, therefore breaking their run of consecutive top tens with "Untouchable". The next week Tinchy Stryder and N-Dubz got knocked down to number two as The Black Eyed Peas' comeback single "Boom Boom Pow" debuted at the top on downloads alone. Lily Allen and Eminem both benefited from physicals as they went to number five and four respectively. Black Eyed Peas were knocked from number 1 by another new entry, Dizzee Rascal with his new hit "Bonkers". Eurovision winner Alexander Rybak also had a top ten placing with "Fairytale".

Lady Gaga finally got knocked from the number one album spot by Bob Dylan with Together Through Life, his first studio album in almost three years. The Enemy's new album Music for the People went straight in at number two. On 17 May Bob Dylan got knocked down seven places by Green Day's new album 21st Century Breakdown which only had two days of sales to get to number 1. The long-awaited comeback album from musician Eminem titled Relapse goes straight to the top becoming this year's fastest selling album with over 166,000 copies in its first week in the UK. Also in the top ten was Madness' new album and Journal for Plague Lovers by Manic Street Preachers at numbers five and three respectively.

=== June ===
On the first chart of June, Black Eyed Peas regained the number one spot from Dizzee Rascal after Britain's Got Talent winners, Diversity danced to it in their winning routine. Agnes's debut single in the UK Release Me peaked at number three. Keri Hilson's follow-up single "Knock You Down" climbed to number six. On 14 June chart, Pixie Lott debuted at number one with her single "Mama Do (Uh Oh, Uh Oh)". Also on the singles chart, "When Love Takes Over" by David Guetta featuring Kelly Rowland charted at number seven after a rush release due to a "cover" version being released on iTunes, before climbing to the top spot a week later. The cover, by Airi L, charted at number twenty-two. The following week, David Guetta was knocked off the number one spot by a new entry from La Roux; the band's third single, "Bulletproof". Also this week, the top one hundred singles chart saw a staggering twenty-eight re-entries from Michael Jackson (six of which reached the top forty), following the singer's death. Lady Gaga's third single, "Paparazzi" entered the top five at number four.

Paolo Nutini reached the number one albums spot with his second album Sunny Side Up whilst Daniel Merriweather's debut album went straight to number two. The next week Kasabian went straight in at number one on the albums chart with West Ryder Pauper Lunatic Asylum. Other high new entries on the albums came from The Black Eyed Peas with The E.N.D. at three and Little Boots with Hands at five. Following the death of "King of Pop" Michael Jackson, his album Number Ones reclaimed the top spot after first reaching number one in 2003. His album, Thriller, also re-entered the top-ten albums chart at number seven. Five other albums by Michael Jackson also re-entered the top one-hundred albums chart, King of Pop, Off the Wall, The Essential Michael Jackson, Thriller 25 and Bad. In this otherwise fairly quiet week, the highest new entry was at number fifteen for The Music of My Life by Neil Sedaka, while big climbers going back into the top 5 came from Take That with The Circus moving up 12 to 4, and Lady Gaga with The Fame moving up 18 to 5.

Oasis begins the summer stadium leg of their world tour with 3 sold-out homecoming concerts at the 70,000 capacity Heaton Park between 4 and 7 June.

=== July ===
On 5 July, thirty-seven Michael Jackson songs reached the Top 100 (beating last week's record of twenty-eight), thirteen of which reached the Top 40, breaking Elvis Presley's record of seven, the highest of those was "Man in the Mirror" which reached number two, it was beaten to number one by Cascada with "Evacuate the Dancefloor", which knocked the previous week's number one "Bulletproof" by La Roux down to number three.

In the Album Chart, a total of eleven Michael Jackson albums reached the Top 100, with The Essential Michael Jackson making it to the top spot. Number One's and King of Pop were also both in the top five and Thriller and Off The Wall made the top ten, the highest new entry was La Roux's self titled debut album which reached number two. With The Essential Michael Jackson knocking Number Ones off the top spot, Jackson became only the third act to ever manage two consecutive No. 1 albums – the first act to do it was The Beatles who achieved the feat twice, and later Mike Oldfield became the second. Florence and the Machine, with her debut album Lungs, which was released on 6 July, spent five weeks at No. 2 behind Michael Jackson.

After two weeks at the top spot, "Evacuate the Dancefloor" was knocked to No. 2 by JLS' debut single "Beat Again." The second highest new entry that week came from Chicane, who reached No. 7 with his trance reworking of "Hoppípolla" by Sigur Rós, entitled "Poppiholla". 3OH!3 also released debut single "Don't Trust Me" in the UK and charted at No. 21, while "21 Guns" by Green Day reached No. 40 after a twenty place climb on physical release. The following week however, it climbed to No. 39 as Michael Jackson's songs dropped. This became the band's lowest peaking single to date, peaking 15 places lower than previous single "Know Your Enemy".

JLS continued on to spend a second week at the summit, fighting off competition from the week's highest new entry, Mr Hudson and Kanye West's Supernova at No. 2 and I Gotta Feeling by The Black Eyed Peas which stayed at No. 3. With the release of Now 73 that week, five 'older' songs re-entered the chart – the highest was Lily Allen with Not Fair at No. 28. The only other new entry that week was Frankmusik's Confusion Girl (Shame Shame Shame), and Beyoncé climbed up into the top ten with Sweet Dreams, the fourth top ten single from I Am... Sasha Fierce.

=== August ===
On 2 August, The Black Eyed Peas finally reached number one with I Gotta Feeling, seven weeks after it was first available. The highest new entry was I Made It Through The Rain by John Barrowman at No. 14, after a campaign on Chris Moyles' BBC Radio 1 breakfast show to get the song into the charts. The next week saw the Black Eyed Peas replaced by the second number 1 for Tinchy Stryder, Never Leave You (with Amelle Berrabah from girl band Sugababes). On the album chart Michael Jackson's greatest hits The Essential remained at No. 1 for a sixth week, with Florence + The Machine's Lungs at No. 2 for a fifth week. Tinchy Stryder's run only lasted one week as 16 August saw the Black Eyed Peas return to No. 1 on the singles chart with "I Gotta Feeling" climbing back to the top, and Michael Jackson's seventh and final week at No. 1 on the albums chart. This week (16 August) also saw Beyoncé's latest album, I Am... Sasha Fierce, raise to its highest peak thus far of No. 2, after 39 weeks on the chart, due to the success of her latest top 5 single, "Sweet Dreams".

Both charts saw new number 1s the following week, with David Guetta achieving his second number 1 with Sexy Bitch, this time featuring Akon as the vocalist. Calvin Harris replaced Michael Jackson at the top of the albums chart with Ready for the Weekend, with the single of the same name reaching No. 3, while Tinchy Stryder's album Catch 22 reached No. 2.

The final number 1 single of August saw Dizzee Rascal's third chart topper in a row with Holiday, which like his previous year's number 1 Dance Wiv Me was produced by Calvin Harris and also features R&B singer Chrome. The Arctic Monkeys entered at number 1 on the albums chart with Humbug.

On 28 August a backstage fight before a concert, between brothers Noel Gallagher and Liam Gallagher led to the official splitting up of the Britpop band Oasis, announced by brother Noel on the band's website. Oasis was later said to be continuing without Noel under the new name Beady Eye.

=== September ===
Another new number 1 single on 6 September, with Jay-Z teaming up with Rihanna and Kanye West for Run This Town. At number 2 was the Sugababes with Get Sexy, their biggest hit in two years, and at number 6, Kings of Leon made a surprising return to the top 10 with 2008 hit Sex on Fire, which regained popularity after the summer festival season and being covered on the ITV1 talent show The X Factor. On the albums chart the Arctic Monkeys spent a second week at No. 1, while Dame Vera Lynn's greatest hits album We'll Meet Again climbed to number 2. It was the 70th anniversary of the outbreak of World War II, when her career flourished, and at the age of 92, this made her the oldest ever living person to have an album chart that high. Kings of Leon repeated their success from the singles chart with their album Only by the Night climbing from outside the top 20 back to number 4.

On 13 September, Pixie Lott broke the record for the largest jump to number 1 within a top 75, with "Boys and Girls" climbing 72 places after being No. 73 the previous week. There was also competition from Mika, returning after two years with "We Are Golden", new dance group Mini Viva with "Left My Heart in Tokyo", rock band Muse returned with "Uprising", the lead single from new album The Resistance and Shakira returned after three years with "She Wolf", all entering at No. 4, #7, No. 9 and No. 25 respectively. Meanwhile, Lady Gaga's fourth single LoveGame peaked at number 19, despite the song's controversial music video and lyrics. However, it had already entered the charts earlier in the year thanks to download sales from her debut album The Fame.

=== October ===
Taio Cruz's Break Your Heart remained at the top spot for the first week of October, beating the likes of Madonna. The following week Chipmunk's third single Oopsy Daisy reached the top spot making it his first UK number one hit, and second hit inside the top 10. On 18 October Alexandra Burke's new song from her new album featuring Flo Rida 'Bad Boys' reached the number one spot. The final number one single of October was Cheryl's debut solo single Fight For This Love which was the fastest selling single of the year.

=== November ===
Robbie Williams and JLS battled for the No. 1 spot in the UK Album Chart, but once it reached 15 November by a margin of less than 1% (around 2,000 copies), it was JLS & their self-titled debut album that reached the top, beating Robbies Reality Killed the Video Star. Their 2nd single, Everybody in Love also topped the chart for a week from 14 November. On 29 November, Susan Boyle has topped the UK album chart this week with her debut release I Dreamed A Dream. Peter Kay's Animated All Star Band were up 17 places this week, topping the UK singles chart with The Official BBC Children in Need Medley. This was followed by last week's number one, The X Factor Finalists at number two with "You Are Not Alone". Having topped the download chart this week, Jason Derulo was a non-mover at number three in the singles chart with "Whatcha Say". This was followed by The Black Eyed Peas at four with "Meet Me Halfway" and Lady Gaga up three places to number five with "Bad Romance". The highest new entry inside the top ten came from Rihanna, as her new single "Russian Roulette" came in at number six this week.

=== December ===
The first week of the last month of the decade started with Peter Kay's Animated All Star Band remaining at number one for a second week, holding off Rihanna's "Russian Roulette" which climbed to number two. new entries in the top ten included Alicia Keys' "Doesn't Mean Anything" at number eight and Timbaland featuring SoShy and Nelly Furtado with "Morning After Dark" at number nine. Susan Boyle remained at the top of the album chart (where it has now been for three weeks). On 13 December, Lady Gaga's "Bad Romance" climbed to number one, therefore making chart history as Gaga now holds the title of most number one singles by a female artist in one year (tallying three). In the same week Kesha finally broke into the top five, and Timbaland climbed to number six.

The Chart upset of the decade came in December, as the Christmas number one was achieved not by the X Factor winner, Joe McElderry but by 1990s rap metal band Rage Against the Machine. A Facebook group, set up to halt "Simon Cowells stranglehold on the charts" by getting the 1992 "Killing in the Name" to the top of the charts, got 750,000 members and led Rage Against the Machine to the first download-only Christmas number one, selling over 500,000 copies – ahead of Joe McElderry by 50,000. In the following week's chart (week ending 2 January 2010) McElderry's single, "The Climb" made it to the number one spot.

== Number ones ==
=== Singles ===
Key
†	Best-selling single of the year

Chart date (week ending)	Song	Artist(s)	Sales
3 January	"Hallelujah"	Alexandra Burke	311,887
10 January	"Hallelujah"	Alexandra Burke	104,455
17 January	"Just Dance"	Lady Gaga featuring Colby O'Donis	65,764
24 January	"Just Dance"	Lady Gaga featuring Colby O'Donis	77,351
31 January	"Just Dance"	Lady Gaga featuring Colby O'Donis	74,139
7 February	"The Fear"	Lily Allen	83,367
14 February	"The Fear"	Lily Allen	69,002
21 February	"The Fear"	Lily Allen	59,671
28 February	"The Fear"	Lily Allen	45,629
7 March	"My Life Would Suck Without You"	Kelly Clarkson	51,115
14 March	"Right Round"	Flo Rida featuring Kesha	72,101
21 March	"Barry Islands in the Stream"	Vanessa Jenkins & Bryn West featuring Sir Tom Jones & Robin Gibb	87,177
28 March	"Poker Face" †	Lady Gaga	53,699
4 April	"Poker Face" †	Lady Gaga	57,781
11 April	"Poker Face" †	Lady Gaga	55,318
18 April	"I'm Not Alone"	Calvin Harris	66,970
25 April	"I'm Not Alone"	Calvin Harris	62,012
2 May	"Number 1"	Tinchy Stryder featuring N-Dubz	72,257
9 May	"Number 1"	Tinchy Stryder featuring N-Dubz	72,374
16 May	"Number 1"	Tinchy Stryder featuring N-Dubz	57,150
23 May	"Boom Boom Pow"	The Black Eyed Peas	74,440
30 May	"Bonkers"	Dizzee Rascal & Armand Van Helden	114,165
6 June	"Bonkers"	Dizzee Rascal & Armand Van Helden	63,141
13 June	"Boom Boom Pow"	The Black Eyed Peas	55,849
20 June	"Mama Do (Uh Oh, Uh Oh)"	Pixie Lott	58,839
27 June	"When Love Takes Over"	David Guetta featuring Kelly Rowland	78,108
4 July	"Bulletproof"	La Roux	80,144
11 July	"Evacuate the Dancefloor"	Cascada	61,211
18 July	"Evacuate the Dancefloor"	Cascada	64,260
25 July	"Beat Again"	JLS	106,299
1 August	"Beat Again"	JLS	67,731
8 August	"I Gotta Feeling"	The Black Eyed Peas	61,314
15 August	"Never Leave You"	Tinchy Stryder featuring Amelle Berrabah	71,146
22 August	"I Gotta Feeling"	The Black Eyed Peas	61,107
29 August	"Sexy Bitch"	David Guetta featuring Akon	55,207
5 September	"Holiday"	Dizzee Rascal	80,070
12 September	"Run This Town"	Jay-Z featuring Rihanna & Kanye West	62,835
19 September	"Boys and Girls"	Pixie Lott	49,623
26 September	"Break Your Heart"	Taio Cruz	65,401
3 October	"Break Your Heart"	Taio Cruz	48,942
10 October	"Break Your Heart"	Taio Cruz	42,746
17 October	"Oopsy Daisy"	Chipmunk featuring Ms D	82,390
24 October	"Bad Boys"	Alexandra Burke featuring Flo Rida	187,100
31 October	"Fight for This Love"	Cheryl	292,845
7 November	"Fight for This Love"	Cheryl	138,614
14 November	"Everybody in Love"	JLS	121,809
21 November	"Meet Me Halfway"	The Black Eyed Peas	100,237
28 November	"You Are Not Alone"	The X Factor Finalists 2009	193,176
5 December	"The Official BBC Children in Need Medley"	Peter Kay's Animated All Star Band	138,123
12 December	"The Official BBC Children in Need Medley"	Peter Kay's Animated All Star Band	111,637
19 December	"Bad Romance"	Lady Gaga	72,918
26 December	"Killing in the Name"	Rage Against the Machine	502,569

=== Albums ===
Key
†	Best-selling album of the year

Chart date (week ending)	Album	Artist	Sales
3 January	The Circus	Take That	312,709
10 January	The Circus	Take That	46,958
17 January	Only by the Night	Kings of Leon	27,115
24 January	The Script	The Script	32,978
31 January	To Lose My Life...	White Lies	28,196
7 February	Working on a Dream	Bruce Springsteen	67,316
14 February	Working on a Dream	Bruce Springsteen	26,158
21 February	It's Not Me, It's You	Lily Allen	112,568
28 February	Only by the Night	Kings of Leon	67,001
7 March	Invaders Must Die	The Prodigy	97,254
14 March	No Line on the Horizon	U2	157,926
21 March	No Line on the Horizon	U2	44,261
28 March	Songs for My Mother	Ronan Keating	87,030
4 April	Songs for My Mother	Ronan Keating	36,847
11 April	The Fame	Lady Gaga	38,031
18 April	The Fame	Lady Gaga	44,978
25 April	The Fame	Lady Gaga	32,802
2 May	The Fame	Lady Gaga	33,828
9 May	Together Through Life	Bob Dylan	42,839
16 May	Together Through Life	Bob Dylan	28,425
23 May	21st Century Breakdown	Green Day	79,770
30 May	Relapse	Eminem	175,052
6 June	Relapse	Eminem	54,078
13 June	Sunny Side Up	Paolo Nutini	62,937
20 June	West Ryder Pauper Lunatic Asylum	Kasabian	98,423
27 June	West Ryder Pauper Lunatic Asylum	Kasabian	57,628
4 July	Number Ones	Michael Jackson	46,403
11 July	The Essential Michael Jackson	Michael Jackson	69,329
18 July	The Essential Michael Jackson	Michael Jackson	113,910
25 July	The Essential Michael Jackson	Michael Jackson	92,368
1 August	The Essential Michael Jackson	Michael Jackson	57,553
8 August	The Essential Michael Jackson	Michael Jackson	45,870
15 August	The Essential Michael Jackson	Michael Jackson	34,444
22 August	The Essential Michael Jackson	Michael Jackson	25,970
29 August	Ready for the Weekend	Calvin Harris	36,308
5 September	Humbug	Arctic Monkeys	96,313
12 September	Humbug	Arctic Monkeys	35,755
19 September	We'll Meet Again: The Very Best of Vera Lynn	Vera Lynn	32,826
26 September	The Resistance	Muse	148,161
3 October	Celebration	Madonna	77,299
10 October	Brand New Eyes	Paramore	53,596
17 October	Love Is the Answer	Barbra Streisand	27,569
24 October	In This Light and on This Evening	Editors	30,669
31 October	Overcome	Alexandra Burke	132,065
7 November	3 Words	Cheryl	125,271
14 November	3 Words	Cheryl	75,399
21 November	JLS	JLS	239,644
28 November	Echo	Leona Lewis	161,929
5 December	I Dreamed a Dream †	Susan Boyle	411,820
12 December	I Dreamed a Dream †	Susan Boyle	303,708
19 December	I Dreamed a Dream †	Susan Boyle	274,148
26 December	I Dreamed a Dream †	Susan Boyle	352,612

=== Compilation albums ===
Chart date (week ending)	Album
3 January	Now 71
10 January	Now 71
17 January	Mamma Mia! The Movie Soundtrack
24 January	Motown 50
31 January	Motown 50
7 February	Motown 50
14 February	Motown 50
21 February	R&B Love Songs 2009
28 February	BRIT Awards 2009
7 March	Mash Up Euphoria – Mixed by the Cut Up
14 March	Addicted to Bass 2009
21 March	Addicted to Bass 2009
28 March	101 Housework Songs
4 April	Clubland Classix 2
11 April	Clubland Classix 2
18 April	Now 72
25 April	Now 72
2 May	Now 72
9 May	Now 72
16 May	Now 72
23 May	R&B Collection: Summer 2009
30 May	Chilled 2: 1991–2009
6 June	Chilled 2: 1991–2009
13 June	Chilled 2: 1991–2009
20 June	Chilled 2: 1991–2009
27 June	Chilled 2: 1991–2009
4 July	Clubland 15
11 July	Clubland 15
18 July	Gatecrashers Trance Anthems – 1993–2009
25 July	Gatecrashers Trance Anthems – 1993–2009
1 August	Now 73
8 August	Now 73
15 August	Now 73
22 August	Now 73
29 August	Now 73
5 September	Now 73
12 September	Now 73
19 September	Now 73
26 September	Now 73
3 October	Now 73
10 October	Big Tunes – Back to the 90s
17 October	Now 73
24 October	Now 73
31 October	BBC Radio 1's Live Lounge – Vol 4
7 November	The Twilight Saga – New Moon
14 November	Dreamboats & Petticoats 3
21 November	Clubland 16
28 November	Words for You
5 December	Now 74
12 December	Now 74
19 December	Now 74
26 December	Now 74

=== Other charts ===
- List of UK Dance Singles Chart number ones of 2009
- List of UK Independent Singles Chart number ones of 2009
- List of UK R&B Singles Chart number ones of 2009
- List of UK Rock & Metal Singles Chart number ones of 2009
- List of UK top-ten singles in 2009

== Year-end charts ==
=== Best-selling singles of 2009 ===
No.	Title	Artist	Peak position	Sales
1	"Poker Face"	Lady Gaga	1	882,059
2	"I Gotta Feeling"	The Black Eyed Peas	1	848,648
3	"Just Dance"	Lady Gaga featuring Colby O'Donis	1	767,558
4	"Fight for This Love"	Cheryl Cole	1	745,738
5	"The Climb"	Joe McElderry	1	716,358
6	"In for the Kill"	La Roux	2	670,390
7	"Boom Boom Pow"	The Black Eyed Peas	1	616,980
8	"Killing in the Name"	Rage Against the Machine	1	608,077
9	"Bad Boys"	Alexandra Burke featuring Flo Rida	1	576,019
10	"Meet Me Halfway"	The Black Eyed Peas	1	567,948
11	"Number 1"	Tinchy Stryder featuring N-Dubz	1	
12	"Sexy Chick"	David Guetta featuring Akon	1	
13	"Use Somebody"	Kings of Leon	3 (Note: Reached number 2 in 2008)	
14	"The Fear"	Lily Allen	1	
15	"Bonkers"	Dizzee Rascal and Armand Van Helden	1	
16	"Beat Again"	JLS	1	
17	"Bad Romance"	Lady Gaga	1	
18	"Sex on Fire"	Kings of Leon	6 (Note: Reached number 1 in 2008)	
19	"Broken Strings"	James Morrison featuring Nelly Furtado	2	
20	"When Love Takes Over"	David Guetta featuring Kelly Rowland	1	
21	"Paparazzi"	Lady Gaga	4	
22	"Right Round"	Flo Rida featuring Kesha	1	
23	"I'm Not Alone"	Calvin Harris	1	
24	"Bulletproof"	La Roux	1	
25	"Halo"	Beyoncé	4	
26	"Jai Ho! (You Are My Destiny)"	A.R. Rahman & The Pussycat Dolls	3	
27	"The Official BBC Children in Need Medley"	Peter Kay's Animated All Star Band	1	
28	"You Are Not Alone"	The X Factor Finalists 2009	1	
29	"Love Story"	Taylor Swift	2	
30	"Empire State of Mind"	Jay-Z featuring Alicia Keys	2	
31	"Evacuate the Dancefloor"	Cascada	1	
32	"Not Fair"	Lily Allen	5	
33	"Day 'n' Nite"	Kid Cudi vs. Crookers	2	
34	"Single Ladies (Put a Ring on It)"	Beyoncé	7	
35	"Release Me"	Agnes	3	
36	"Red"	Daniel Merriweather	5	
37	"Break Your Heart"	Taio Cruz	1	
38	"Supernova"	Mr Hudson featuring Kanye West	2	
39	"Sweet Dreams"	Beyoncé	5	
40	"I'm Yours"	Jason Mraz	11	
41	"Knock You Down"	Keri Hilson featuring Kanye West and Ne-Yo	5	
42	"Everybody in Love"	JLS	1	
43	"Don't Upset the Rhythm (Go Baby Go)"	The Noisettes	2	
44	"Breathe Slow"	Alesha Dixon	3	
45	"Tik Tok"	Kesha	5 (Note: Reached number 4 in 2010)	
46	"My Life Would Suck Without You"	Kelly Clarkson	1	
47	"Dead and Gone"	T.I. featuring Justin Timberlake	4	
48	"Oopsy Daisy"	Chipmunk	1	
49	"Beautiful"	Akon featuring Kardinal Offishall and Colby O'Donis	8	
50	"We Made You"	Eminem	4	

=== Best-selling albums of 2009 ===
No.	Title	Artist	Peak position	Sales
1	I Dreamed a Dream	Susan Boyle	1	1,632,732
2	The Fame/The Fame Monster	Lady Gaga	1	1,388,847
3	Crazy Love	Michael Bublé	1	1,197,421
4	The E.N.D.	The Black Eyed Peas	3	1,090,211
5	Only by the Night	Kings of Leon	1	1,078,555
6	JLS	JLS	1	
7	I Am... Sasha Fierce	Beyoncé	2	
8	Sunny Side Up	Paolo Nutini	1	810,459
9	It's Not Me, It's You	Lily Allen	1	
10	Reality Killed the Video Star	Robbie Williams	2	
11	3 Words	Cheryl Cole	1	
12	The Essential Michael Jackson	Michael Jackson	1	
13	The Circus	Take That	1	
14	Up to Now	Snow Patrol	3	
15	Echo	Leona Lewis	1	
16	Invaders Must Die	The Prodigy	1	
17	Absolute Greatest	Queen	3	
18	Lungs	Florence and the Machine	2 (Note: Reached number 1 in 2010)	515,843
19	West Ryder Pauper Lunatic Asylum	Kasabian	1	
20	Songs for You, Truths for Me	James Morrison	3	
21	Coming Home	The Soldiers	4	
22	Overcome	Alexandra Burke	1	
23	Funhouse	Pink	4 (Note: Reached number 1 in 2008)	
24	This Is It	Michael Jackson	3	
25	The Resistance	Muse	1	
26	The Hits	Will Young	7	
27	The Greatest Day	Take That	3	
28	Where We Are	Westlife	2	
29	Day & Age	The Killers	4 (Note: Reached number 1 in 2008)	
30	Relapse	Eminem	1	
31	Soulbook	Rod Stewart	9	
32	The Seldom Seen Kid	Elbow	5	
33	Rockferry	Duffy	3 (Note: Reached number 1 in 2008)	
34	No Line on the Horizon	U2	1	
35	21st Century Breakdown	Green Day	1	
36	We'll Meet Again: The Very Best of Vera Lynn	Vera Lynn	1	
37	The Script	The Script	1	
38	Fleet Foxes	Fleet Foxes	3	
39	Freedom	Akon	6	
40	Celebration	Madonna	1	
41	Greatest Hits	Foo Fighters	4	
42	Jackpot! The Best Bette	Bette Midler	6	
43	La Roux	La Roux	2	
44	Against All Odds	N-Dubz	6	
45	The Very Best of Fleetwood Mac	Fleetwood Mac	6	
46	Fearless	Taylor Swift	5	
47	Bad	Michael Jackson	9 (Note: Reached number 1 in 1987)	
48	Spirit	Leona Lewis	2 (Note: Reached number 1 in 2007)	
49	The Annie Lennox Collection	Annie Lennox	2	
50	We Sing. We Dance. We Steal Things.	Jason Mraz	8	

=== Best-selling compilation albums of 2009 ===
No.	Title	Peak position	Sales
1	Now 74	1	1,003,404
2	Now 73	1	754,687
3	Now 72	1	653,370
4	Anthems: Electronic 80s	2	
5	Big Tunes: Back 2 the 90s	1	
6	Mamma Mia! The Movie Soundtrack	1	
7	Pop Party 7: 21 Big Hits	2	
8	Motown 50: Yesterday, Today, Forever	1	
9	Dreamboats and Petticoats Three	1	
10	R&B The Collection: 42 Massive R&B Anthems	3	

== Best-selling artist of 2009 (singles and albums) ==
Artist	Position	Sales
Lady Gaga	1	3,944,906+

== Total album sales ==
Total sales for albums in 2009 amounted to 128,946,805 the lowest since 1999. This record would be beaten in 2013 when only 94,000,000 albums were sold.
