= Capri-Sun (disambiguation) =

Capri-Sun is a brand of juice concentrate drinks.

Capri-Sun, Capri-Sonne, or Caprisun may also refer to:

- Capri-Sonne (cycling team), a Belgian cycling team
- "Capri-Sun", a 2016 song by AJ Tracey featuring Chip
- "Caprisun", a 2017 song by Naps
- "Capri Sun", a 2022 song by Capo Plaza
- Capri_Sonne, a pseudonym for Sun Diego
- Caprisongs, a 2022 mixtape by FKA Twigs

== See also ==
- Caprisongs, a 2022 mixtape by FKA Twigs
