= Gladesmore Community School =

Secondary school in London, England

Location
- Crowland Road; Tottenham, London, N15 6EB; England; 51.5802°N 0.0645°W

Information
- Type: Community school
- Established: 1911
- Local authority: Haringey
- Department for Education URN: 102157 Tables
- Ofsted: Reports
- Headteacher: Paul Bernard
- Gender: Coeducational
- Age: 11 to 16
- Enrolment: 1,314 as of January 2023
- Colours: Blue & Gold
- Website: https://www.gladesmore.com/

Gladesmore Community School is a coeducational secondary school located in Tottenham, London, England.

The school's specialisms include Gifted and Talented, Mathematics and Computing, and Applied Learning.

== History ==
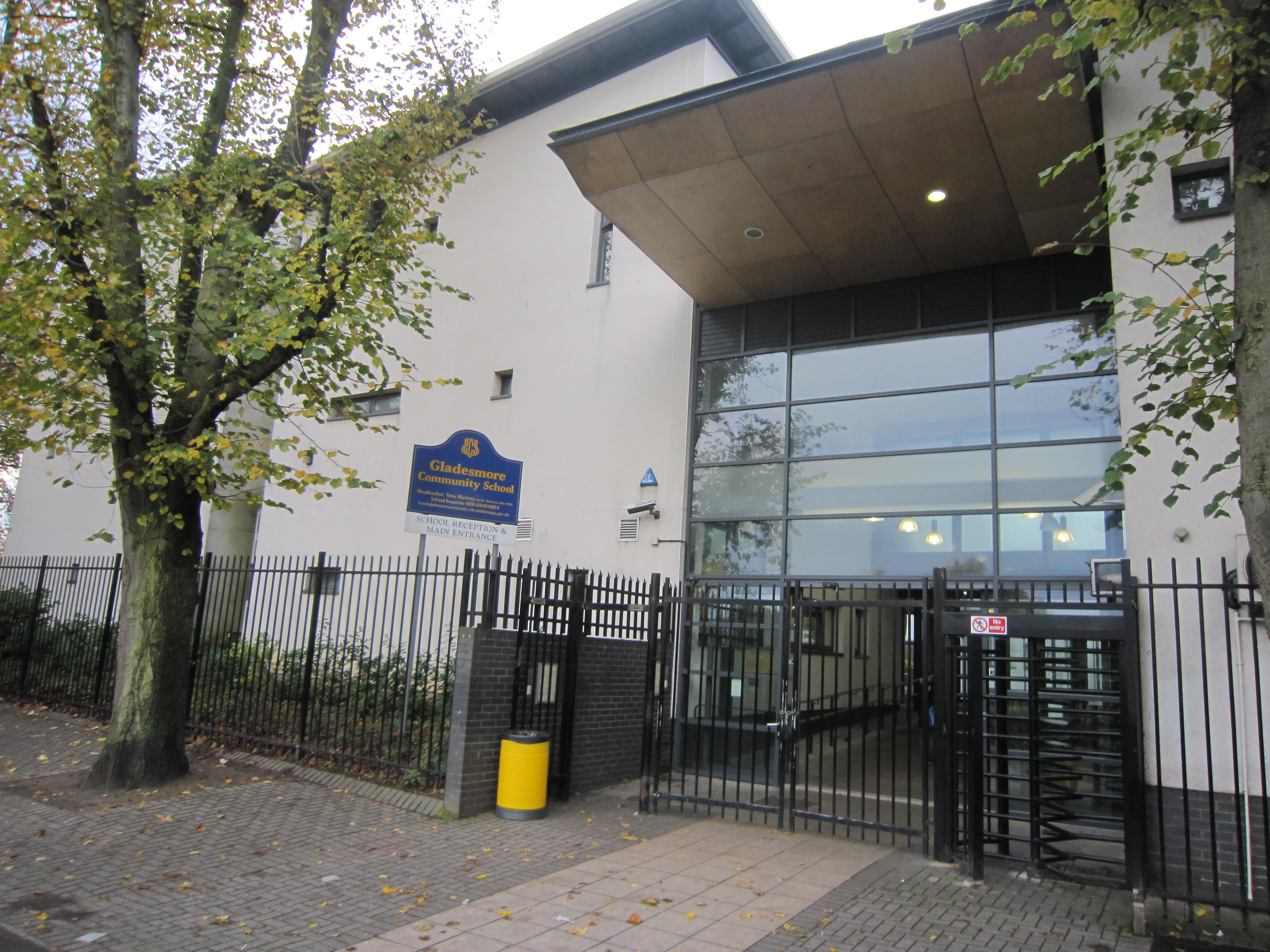
Entrance to Gladesmore School on Crowland Road

Gladesmore combines a number of previous schools in the vicinity:

Crowland Road School opened in 1911 and became Crowland Secondary Modern in 1946.

The Crowland School buildings then became part of the new Markfield County Secondary, which was founded in 1956.

Drayton School then replaced Markfield School, opening in Gladesmore Road in 1967.

Gladesmore was a poor school in the 1970s-90s, but when Tony Hartney became Headteacher in 1999, the school was transformed from Poor to Outstanding, receiving extremely positive reviews from Ofsted, it is rated as exemplary gaining three consecutive judgements of outstanding in all categories. In 2006, Mr Hartney was appointed a CBE for his work at the school.

Gladesmore received the Queen's Award for Service on 29 June 2011.

== Prefecture ==
Pupils may apply to become a prefect in year 10, stating their qualities and suitability. In year 11, a head boy and head girl are appointed, along with a deputy for each. Students may vote for a boy and a girl in their year to become a part of the School Council. Gladesmore embraces the rich diversity of its community and plays a strong role in promoting improvements. The ethos of the school is extremely positive, friendly and uplifting. students and staff relate very well to each other and enjoy a 'family' atmosphere. This later changed to gaining "Prefect Points" In year 10 for students to become Head Prefects as shown at the reception in Gladesmore Community School from the head prefects over the years which includes the Class of 2025 and Class of 2026

== Value Life ==
In 2003, Gladesmore students founded the Value Life campaign, aiming to teach students how to stay safe and make the most of their life. It tackles gun and knife crime. This evolved into a series of large events, such as a carnival, a march, a music video and a short film.

Value Life was supported by many officials, such as Queen Elizabeth II, Boris Johnson & David Cameron. The campaign won the Philip Lawrence Award in 2008.

== Everybody Dreams ==
In 2011, Gladesmore founded the Everybody Dreams campaign, which aims to improve the reputation of Tottenham after the 2011 England Riots. This included the release of a song performed by pupils at the school. It was supported by people like Leona Lewis, Donald Trump, Dave Stewart David Lammy, Boris Johnson, Westlife's Mark Feehily, Ricky Gervais, Jessica Ennis and Wretch 32. The song reached number 33 in the iTunes Chart.

== Notable former pupils ==
- Mike McFarlane British commonwealth 100 metres champion 1982.
- The Demon Boyz - UK founding fathers of Reggae-rap music achieving top 20 status in the national charts 1992.
- Rebel MC - Creator of Jungle and Drum & Bass music achieved two top 3 hits in the mid to late 80s in the national charts.
- Chip (formerly Chipmunk), solo grime artist, who used the school to shoot the video for his single "Chip Diddy Chip".
- Emmanuel Frimpong, former footballer at Arsenal.
- Professor Green, rapper.
- Wendell Richardson, lead guitarist with Osibisa.
- Gabriel Zakuani, footballer.
- Steve Zakuani, footballer.
- Bob Bradbury, musician, founding member singer and guitarist of 1970s glam rock band, Hello.
- Elijah Quashie, "The Chicken Connoisseur", food critic and author.
