= Beast (Chipmunk song) =

Single by Chipmunk featuring Loick Essien

from the album I Am Chipmunk
- B-side: "Hit Maker"
- Released: 8 December 2008
- Recorded: 2008
- Genre: Grime, rap rock
- Length: 3:54
- Label: Alwayz Recordings
- Songwriters: Chipmunk, Talay Riley, Parker & James
- Producers: Parker & James

Chipmunk singles chronology
"Who Are You?" (2006)	"Beast" (2008)	"Chip Diddy Chip" (2009)

"Beast" is the debut single by British rapper Chipmunk, released in December 2008. It is the first single taken from his debut studio album, I Am Chipmunk. It was released on the Alwayz Recordings label. The music video for "Beast" was uploaded to the Alwayz Recordings YouTube account on 8 November 2008. The "Beast" video was directed by Mo. The video is presented in black and white with Loick Essien making a guest appearance throughout.

== Track listing ==
- CD single
1. "Beast" - 3:56
2. "Beast" (Bassline Remix) - 4:40
3. "Beast" (Grime Remix) (featuring Loick Essien, Wretch 32 & Bashy) - 3:56
4. "Hit Maker" (featuring Stylo G) - 3:33

== Charts ==
Chart (2008)	Peak position
UK Singles Chart	181

== Release history ==
Region	Date	Format	Label
United Kingdom	7 December 2008	Digital download	Alwayz Recordings
United Kingdom	8 December 2008	CD single	Alwayz Recordings
