= Chip Diddy Chip =

2009 single by Chip

Single by Chipmunk

from the album I Am Chipmunk
- B-side: "I Met a Hustler"
- Released: 2 March 2009
- Recorded: 2008–2009
- Genre: Grime, hip hop
- Length: 3:29
- Label: Alwayz Recordings
- Songwriter(s): Jahmaal Fyffe
- Producer(s): John Hendicott

Chipmunk singles chronology
"Beast" (2008)	"Chip Diddy Chip" (2009)	"Tiny Dancer (Hold Me Closer)" (2009)

"Chip Diddy Chip" is a song by rapper Chipmunk. It was released as the lead single from his debut album I Am Chipmunk on 2 March 2009.

== Music video ==
The music video for the song shows Chipmunk at school with his friends, and one boy (John Farnworth) is performing keepie-uppie with a football. It also shows Chip counting A-grades from his GCSE results. It features Tim Westwood, Dino Contostavlos (Dappy from N-Dubz), Wretch 32 and Griminal as well as other British artists. The video also features actor Adam Deacon and artists JME, Griminal, Double S, Bashy and DJ Ironik as schoolchildren.

DJ Ill appears at the end of the video, as the school janitor. The music video was filmed at Gladesmore Community School (which Chip attended as a pupil) and features some of the Gladesmore Class of 2010 pupils. One of the members of the dance group Flawless is also featured in the video. The video was filmed by Ben & Vertex.

"Chip Diddy Chip" earned him an award at the 2009 MOBO Awards for 'Best Hip Hop Act', beating nominees such as Eminem and Kanye West.

== Track listing ==
- CD single
1. "Chip Diddy Chip" - 3:29
2. "Chip Diddy Chip" (Radio Version) - 3:03
3. "I Met A Hustler" - 4:12

== Charts ==
Chart (2009)	Peak position
UK Singles (OCC)	21
UK Indie (OCC)	1
UK Hip Hop/R&B (OCC)	8
