= Rap vs. Grime =

Mixtape by Chip
- Released: 25 December 2015
- Recorded: 2015
- Genre: British hip hop; grime
- Length: 38:24
- Label: Cash Motto
- Producer: Face; Scholar; Splurgeboys

Chip chronology
Believe & Achieve: EPisode 2 (2015)	Rap vs. Grime (2015)	Power Up (2016)

Singles from Rap vs. Grime
- 1. "Duppy Riddim" Released: 22 October 2015; 2. "#Alone" Released: 6 November 2015; 3. "Hard Food" Released: 18 December 2015; 4. "Hear Dis" Released: 25 December 2015; 5. "Sonic Boom" Released: 19 January 2016; 6. "BlukuByeByeBye" Released: 26 February 2016

Rap vs. Grime is the tenth mixtape by British rapper Chip, released for free download on 25 December 2015. The project, which is hosted by Hot 97's Peter Rosenberg, includes diss tracks aimed at Bugzy Malone and Tinie Tempah. While six music videos from the mixtape were released, "Hear Dis" / "BlukuByeByeBye" was the only single released onto iTunes, and the song entered the UK Singles Chart at number 199. It also peaked at number 26 on the UK Indie Chart.

== Track listing ==
Digital download
No.	Title	Producer(s)	Length
1.	"Rosenberg Hot 97 Intro"		0:40
2.	"My Way"	NickEBeats^{[a]}; JayFrance^{[a]}	2:28
3.	"BlukuByeByeBye"	Face	3:00
4.	"Hard Food"	Dr. Dre^{[a]}; Mel-Man^{[a]}	3:07
5.	"Hear Dis" (with Stormzy)	Scholar	3:20
6.	"Feel So Good"	D-Dot^{[a]}; Sean "Puffy" Combs^{[a]}	2:56
7.	"Westwood (Live Forever)"		0:25
8.	"Duppy Riddim"	Danny Weed^{[a]}	2:36
9.	"#Alone"	Wiley^{[a]}	3:28
10.	"Classic Man"	Jidenna^{[a]}; Nana Kwabena^{[a]}; Nate "Rocket" Wonder^{[a]}	1:58
11.	"Sonic Boom"	Splurgeboys	3:41
12.	"Look Like You"		2:45
13.	"Feature Medley"		8:02
Total length:			38:24

Notes

- ^{^a} signifies a sampled instrumental which was not produced exclusively for the mixtape.
- "Rosenberg Hot 97 Intro" features vocals by Peter Rosenberg.
- "My Way" heavily samples and uses the instrumental from "My Way" by Fetty Wap.
- "Hard Food" uses the instrumental from "Forgot About Dre" by Dr. Dre featuring Eminem.
- "Feel So Good" uses the instrumental from "Feel So Good" by Mase.
- "Westwood (Live Forever)" features vocals by Tim Westwood.
- "#Alone" samples a remixed version of "Fire Hydrant" by Wiley.
- "Classic Man" heavily samples and uses the instrumental from "Classic Man" by Jidenna featuring Roman GianArthur.
- "Sonic Boom" samples and contains interpolations of "Scholarships" by Drake and Future.
- "Look Like You" uses the instrumental from "Look Like You" by Grizzy and M Dargg.
- "Feature Medley" is a compilation of songs Chip featured on throughout 2014 and 2015. It consists of Wiley's "Flying (Remix)", Krept and Konan's "Don't Waste My Time (Remix)", Frisco's "Are You?", Fekky's "Still Sittin' Here (Remix)", Loick's "Nobody (Remix)", Ghetts' "Man Like Me (Remix)", Young Spray's "Proud", Mercston's "All Now", WSTRN's "In2 (Remix)" and Dexplicit's "Link Up Season".
