= I Am Chipmunk =

Studio album by Chipmunk
- Released: 9 October 2009
- Recorded: 2008–2009
- Genre: Hip hop, grime, R&B
- Length: 47:00
- Label: Columbia
- Producer: Kyle James & Pete Parker; Maniac; Louis Gibzen; John Hendicutt; P-nut; Harmony Samuels; Naughty Boy; PROFESSOR TEKA

Chipmunk chronology
I Am Chipmunk (2009)	Transition (2011)

Singles from I Am Chipmunk
- 1. "Beast" Released: 8 December 2008; 2. "Chip Diddy Chip" Released: 2 March 2009; 3. "Diamond Rings" Released: 6 July 2009; 4. "Oopsy Daisy" Released: 4 October 2009; 5. "Look for Me" Released: 28 December 2009; 6. "Until You Were Gone" Released: 16 April 2010

Professional ratings
Review scores
Source	Rating
AllMusic	3.5/5 stars
Digital Spy	3/5 stars
The Guardian	3/5 stars
In the News	6/10
RapReviews	6.5/10
True to Sound	7/10
Virgin Media	2/5 stars

I Am Chipmunk is the debut album by the British rapper Chipmunk, released on 9 October 2009 by Columbia Records. Unknown to many, the album was originally scheduled to have been released the year before: one being 4 May and the other release date being October. It produced four consecutive top 10 singles, including one chart-topper. The album was deemed a success after it debuted at No. 2 on the UK Albums Chart

In-line with its record sales, a new platinum edition of the album was released on 3 May 2010 featuring four new songs, including the single "Until You Were Gone" featuring Dutch singer-songwriter Esmée Denters.

== Singles ==
- "Beast" was the first single taken from I Am Chipmunk and featured Loick Essien on guest vocals. It reached No. 181 on the UK Singles Chart following its release on 8 December 2008.
- "Chip Diddy Chip" was released as the second single from the album on 16 January 2009. The single peaked at No. 21 on the UK Singles Chart.
- "Diamond Rings" was released as the third single on 6 July 2009 and featured vocals from upcoming Scottish R&B singer Emeli Sandé. The single peaked at No. 6 in the UK, marking Chipmunk's first top 10 hit.
- "Oopsy Daisy" was released as the fourth official single on 4 October 2009 and featured vocals from Dayo Olatunji. The single went on to top the UK Singles Chart, marking Chipmunk's first No. 1 single, but also his second consecutive top 10 hit.
- "Look for Me" featuring vocals from Talay Riley was released as the fifth single from the album on 28 December 2009. The single marked Chipmunk's third consecutive top 10 hit when it managed to peak at No. 7 in the UK.
- "Until You Were Gone" served as the sixth official single to be released and the first and only single to be released from the Platinum Edition reissue of the album. The single featured vocals from Dutch pop/R&B singer Esmée Denters and was released on 19 April 2010, where it debuted at No. 3, marking Chipmunk's fourth consecutive top 10 hit and his second most successful single behind "Oopsy Daisy".

Unknown to many, "Muhammad Ali" was also meant to be a single off his album back when it was recorded in 2008. A video was also shot to support the song; whilst the visuals feature other UK artists such as Ghetts, Frisco, Scorcher and many others.

== Commercial performance ==
I Am Chipmunk debuted on the UK Albums Chart at No. 2 on 18 October 2009 behind Editors. In its second week on the chart, the album fell 6 places to No. 8. The album spent 8 weeks in the Top 40 albums, before falling to No. 41 on 22 December 2009.

Chipmunk chose to re-release the album with four extra tracks, including "Until You Were Gone", the lead single from the re-release. The album re-entered the Top 40 on 9 May 2010 at No. 11, before falling out of the top 40 on 2 July the next month.

== Track listing ==
I Am Chipmunk standard edition
No.	Title	Length
1.	"Saviour"	4:03
2.	"Chip Diddy Chip"	3:29
3.	"Oopsy Daisy"	3:36
4.	"Man Dem" (featuring Tinchy Stryder)	3:12
5.	"Diamond Rings" (featuring Emeli Sandé)	3:03
6.	"Lose My Life" (featuring N-Dubz)	3:15
7.	"I AM (Interval)"	3:03
8.	"Dear Family"	4:04
9.	"Beast" (featuring Loick Essien)	3:54
10.	"Look for Me" (featuring Talay Riley)	3:24
11.	"Role Model"	3:56
12.	"Sometimes"	3:06
13.	"Business" (featuring Young Spray)	4:48

Platinum edition bonus tracks
No.	Title	Length
14.	"Until You Were Gone" (featuring Esmée Denters)	3:30
15.	"Uh Ay"	2:35
16.	"Superstar"	3:38
17.	"History" (featuring Wretch 32)	3:13

iTunes standard edition
No.	Title	Length
14.	"Chip TV (This Is My Album)"	5:46

iTunes special edition
No.	Title	Length
14.	"The Best of Chip TV"	7:41
15.	"Chip Diddy Chip" (music video; long version)	4:13

== Chart performance ==
=== Weekly charts ===
Weekly chart performance for I Am Chipmunk
Chart (2009)	Peak position
Irish Albums (IRMA)	49
Scottish Albums (Official Charts)	4
UK Albums (Official Charts)	2
UK R&B Albums (Official Charts)	1

=== Year-end charts ===
Year-end chart performance for I Am Chipmunk
Chart (2009)	Position
UK Albums (OCC)	105

=== Certifications ===
Certifications for I Am Chipmunk
Region	Certification	Certified units/sales
United Kingdom (BPI)	Gold	100,000^{*}
^{*} Sales figures based on certification alone.

== Release history ==
Release history and formats for I Am Chipmunk
Region	Date	Format	Edition	Label
United Kingdom	9 October 2009	Digital download	Standard	Columbia
United Kingdom	12 October 2009	CD	Standard	Columbia
United Kingdom	26 April 2010	Digital download	Platinum	Columbia
United Kingdom	3 May 2010	CD	Platinum	Columbia
