= Look for Me =

Single by Chipmunk featuring Talay Riley

from the album I Am Chipmunk
- Released: 22 November 2009
- Recorded: 2009
- Genre: British hip hop, R&B
- Length: 3:24
- Label: Sony
- Songwriters: Chipmunk, Talay Riley
- Producer: H-Money

Chipmunk singles chronology
"In Your Shoes" (2009)	"Look for Me" (2009)	"Number One Enemy" (2010)

Talay Riley singles chronology
"Look for Me" (2009)	"Humanoid" (2010)

"Look for Me" is the fifth single released from British rapper Chipmunk's debut studio album, I Am Chipmunk. The song was released on 22 November 2009. It features Talay Riley. On 3 December 2009, both Chipmunk and Talay performed the song on Alan Carr: Chatty Man on Channel 4. On 30 December 2009, both Chipmunk and Talay performed the song live on GMTV on ITV1.

== Critical reception ==
Fraser McAlpine of BBC Chart Blog gave the song a positive review and 4 stars stating: "Listen to that chorus, eh? Talay, I barely know you, but I really FEEL that you would BE THERE for me, if the RAIN STARTS TO FA...er..I mean...if I was having a rough time of things. You are clearly a very big-hearted fella, and not adverse to pulling your weight if the people you love needed it. Now, the only problem is, I'm not sure if I can 100% rely on your support if the choruses are full of friendship and love and support for me the listener, but the verses are a big long list of why Chipmunk is brilliant at rapping and probably going to be the best in the world for the rest of time. So, what sort of a song IS this? Is Talay offering to support Chipmunk, should he ever have moments of doubt and uncertainty, so that he can go on to become even more amazing? Should we even be listening to this moment of (*cough*) rad bromance? Well obviously yes we should, Chippy demands it. And what Chippy wants...Santa delivers." Digital Spy awarded the song 3 and a half out of 5 stars and said of the song: "I work hard, like stuff the haters / Took all the stairs, no escalators," raps Chipmunk on his new single. Listening to the line now, the mind can't help but wander to the rapper's recent troubles. Thankfully, the Tottenham lad now seems close to fighting form again and he's got another pop-rap smash up his hoodie sleeve. 'Look for Me' might be derivative – wonder if the Peas agreed to lend him their 'I Gotta Feeling' riff? – but it's perky as a pony with it and Chip shows as much spunky charm as ever. Pick of the lyrics? "Ain't no weave, I'm really hair." Let's hope he gets chance to put his feet up over the Christmas holidays. Popstar or not, no shoes on the sofa though."

== Track listing ==
- Digital download
1. "Look for Me" – 3:24
2. "Lightspeed" – 3:12
3. "Look for Me" (Red Top Remix) – 5:12
4. "Look for Me" (Perempay & Dee Club) – 5:04
- CD single
1. "Look for Me" – 3:24
2. "Lightspeed" – 3:12

== Chart performance ==
"Look for Me" debuted on the UK Singles Charts at #44 on the week ending 22 November 2009. The week later, on the week ending 29 November 2009, it entered the Top 40 Singles at #36, just one day under a month before official release, due to heavy downloads alone. On 8 January 2010, "Look For Me" reached a new peak of #23 in the Irish Singles Chart. In its third week in the UK Singles Charts, it climbed 17 places to #19. On the week ending 13 December 2009, it climbed 9 places a position of #10. On 10 January 2010, "Look For Me" climbed 3 places to reach a peak position of #7. The song has also entered the Irish Singles Chart at a current peak of #24, and peaked at #3 on the UK R&B Chart. As of February 2010, the single has sold over 200,000 copies, making it Chipmunk's second most successful single to date.

Chart (2009–2010)	Peak position
Ireland (IRMA)	24
UK Singles (OCC)	7
UK Hip Hop/R&B (OCC)	2

=== Year-end charts ===
Chart (2009)	Position
UK Singles Chart	141

== Certifications ==
Certifications for "Look for Me"
Region	Certification	Certified units/sales
United Kingdom (BPI)	Silver	200,000^{*}
^{*} Sales figures based on certification alone.

== Release history ==
Country	Date	Format
United Kingdom	28 December 2009	CD single
