= Diamond Rings (song) =

Single by Chipmunk featuring Emeli Sandé

from the album I Am Chipmunk
- Released: 6 July 2009
- Recorded: 2009
- Genre: R&B; hip hop; jazz rap
- Length: 3:07
- Label: Alwayz Recordings
- Songwriters: Jahmaal Fyffe; Emeli Sandé; Shahid Khan
- Producer: Naughty Boy

Chipmunk singles chronology
"Tiny Dancer (Hold Me Closer)" (2009)	"Diamond Rings" (2009)	"Oopsy Daisy" (2009)

Emeli Sandé singles chronology
"Diamond Rings" (2009)	"Never Be Your Woman" (2010)

"Diamond Rings" is the third single released from British rapper Chipmunk's debut studio album, I Am Chipmunk (2009). The song was produced by Naughty Boy and released digitally on 5 July 2009. It features uncredited vocals from Emeli Sandé, who performed the chorus of the song. Chipmunk told Rewind RWD magazine about the lyrics: "It's not about being flash and spending money though; it's more about maintaining your value. It's about feeling good out there." The song samples "Miss Ska-Culation" by Roland Al and the Soul Brothers which in turn samples “Pipeline” by The Ventures.

== Reception ==
BBC Chart Blog critically praised the song giving it 4 out of 5 stars: "It's all in that vocal swoop at the end of each line – "I gotta keep on rhyming, maaaaan" – and the conversational, soft tone of voice. It helps that he is a dapper dresser too, and good at the rhyming. And if you're going to be inspired by anyone, why not pick the best? There again, it's quite hard to take Chipmunk seriously as the hard-bragging, hard-to-beat, rhyme hardnut he is in his lyrics, when he's at such a tender age. All you really want to do is pat his pretty head and say "awww, you kids". He will grow into his own boasts, though, you watch". Digital Spy also praised the song giving it 3 out of 5 stars: "'Diamond Rings' shows no signs of youthful naivety, however, boasting just as much pop polish as recent offerings from N-Dubz and Tinchy Stryder. His bragging raps, "Girls see me and scream cause I'm on the TV", may be lacking in originality, but the track's breezy, ska-infused shuffle and feisty female backing vocals are infectious enough to suggest Chipmunk may have a future in the music industry. Now all he has to do is finish his BA degree and we might just get a full album."

== Music video ==
The music video does not feature Emeli Sandé, who provides the actual vocals for the chorus on the recording. She is replaced by an alternative woman who appears throughout the video miming along to the pre-recorded vocals. The video shows Chipmunk and a woman in a restaurant. The woman is on stage singing while Chipmunk is shown rapping in front of his backing dancers, Flawless. At the end, two policemen enter looking for Chipmunk and the woman. Both sneak out when the policemen aren't looking. A newspaper article later reveals that they are diamond thieves and have escaped again.

== Track listing ==
- CD single
1. "Diamond Rings" – 3:06
2. "Diamond Rings" (Grime Remix) (featuring Kano and Wiley) – 3:06
- Digital download
1. "Diamond Rings" – 3:06
2. "Diamond Rings" (Grime Remix) (featuring Kano and Wiley) – 3:06
3. "Diamond Rings" (Terror Danjah Remix) – 4:38

== Charts ==
=== Weekly charts ===
Chart (2009)	Peak position
European Hot 100	21
UK Singles (OCC)	6

=== Year-end charts ===
Chart (2009)	Position
UK Singles Chart	109

== Certifications ==
Region	Certification	Certified units/sales
United Kingdom (BPI)	Silver	200,000^{‡}
^{‡} Sales+streaming figures based on certification alone.
