= Oopsy Daisy =

Single by Chipmunk

from the album I Am Chipmunk
- Released: 2 October 2009
- Recorded: 2008–2009
- Genre: R&B, hip hop
- Length: 3:38
- Label: Sony, Columbia
- Songwriters: Jahmaal Fyffe & Talay Riley
- Producers: Parker & James

Chipmunk singles chronology
"Diamond Rings" (2009)	"Oopsy Daisy" (2009)	"I Got Soul" (2009)

Dayo Olatunji singles chronology
"Oopsy Daisy" (2009)	"Heatwave" (2012)

"Oopsy Daisy" is a song by British rapper Chipmunk. It features uncredited vocals by R&B singer Dayo Olatunji, who performs the bridge and chorus. The song was produced by the pop production duo Kyle James & Parker Ighile, who co-wrote the top line alongside Talay Riley. The song was officially released on 4 October 2009. An official remix has been made with Boy Better Know.

The song reached number one on the UK Singles Chart on 11 October 2009. Chipmunk's love interest in the music video is played by the British actress Red Madrell.

== Critical reception ==
Fraser McAlpine of BBC Chart Blog gave the song a positive review and 4 stars stating: "You've got to hand it to Chipmunk, there aren't many rappers who can stand out for having particularly strong self-confidence, in a field which is dominated by mirror-kissing loudmouths. Rappers are the only people in the world who, if history was run again from the start, would've invented a soft drink with their name on it before fire. And yet, there's something about this dapper chap's particular form of audacity which never really comes across like proper arrogance. For his latest, the Chipster is sad because he has been hurt by a girl. The way he gets this across is to play some contemplative piano, and to get a lady singer to sing "I'm a walking disaster" and "all I'll do is hurt you again", so he doesn't come across as being some emotionless thug who'd dump a girl for wearing the wrong shade of lipstick. It's her fault, actually!". Digital Spy awarded the song 3/5 stars and said of the song: "Following the top ten success of 'Diamond Rings', Chipmunk hasn't broken ranks from his winning formula. His lyrics about the woes of puppy love, "Baseball love, three strikes you're out, you're too busy trying to catch me out", may be a side-step away from boyband cheese, but thanks to some lush harmonies from Ms D and an infectious piano hook, 'Oopsy Daisy' sounds like another hit. The future of grime? Probably not. A decent pop career ahead? Almost certainly".

== Track listing ==
- CD single / Digital download
1. "Oopsy Daisy" - 3:39
2. "Oopsy Daisy" (Boy Better Know remix) - 3:09

== Chart performance ==
The song sold 82,000 copies in its first week in the UK and managed to beat the lead single of girl group the Saturdays' second album (who are referenced in Chipmunk's song, along with their song "Issues") to the top spot. On the UK R&B Chart, "Oopsy Daisy" debuted and peaked at No. 1 and stayed there for a 5 weeks. On 30 November 2009, Chipmunk went to Twitter to announce that "Oopsy Daisy" had sold over 200,000 copies in less than 2 months of its release; to this date the single has sold over 500,000 copies in the UK and 50,000 around the world.

== Charts and certifications ==
=== Weekly charts ===
Chart (2009)	Peak position
Czech Singles Chart	17
Germany (GfK)	46
Ireland (IRMA)	7
New Zealand (Recorded Music NZ)	31
Scotland Singles (OCC)	1
UK Singles (OCC)	1
UK Hip Hop/R&B (OCC)	1

=== Year-end charts ===
Chart (2009)	Position
UK Singles Chart	12

Chart (2010)	Position
UK Singles Chart	49

=== Decade-end charts ===
Chart (2000–2009)	Position
UK Singles Chart	107

== Certifications ==
Region	Certification	Certified units/sales
United Kingdom (BPI)	Platinum	600,000^{‡}
^{‡} Sales+streaming figures based on certification alone.

== Release history ==
Region	Date	Format	Label
United Kingdom	4 October 2009	Digital download	Sony Music UK, Jive
United Kingdom	5 October 2009	CD single	Sony Music UK, Jive
Germany	24 November 2009	Digital download	Sony Music UK, Jive

== See also ==
- List of number-one singles from the 2000s (UK)
- List of number-one R&B hits of 2009 (UK)
