= Chip (rapper) =

British rapper (born 1990)

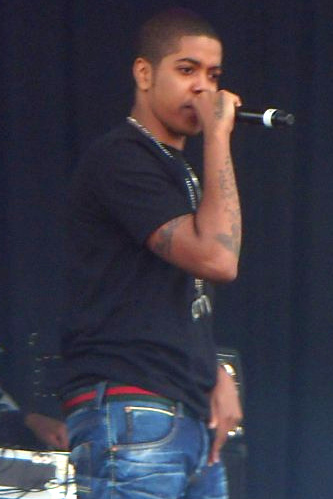
- Chip performing in 2011

Background information
- Also known as: Chipmunk
- Born: Jahmaal Noel Fyffe; 26 November 1990 (age 35); Tottenham, London, England
- Genres: Hip-hop; grime
- Occupations: Rapper; songwriter
- Years active: 2004–present
- Labels: Jive (2009–2011); Grand Hustle (2012–2014); Cash Motto (2014–present)
- Formerly of: Shoddy Crew; Circular Movements
- Website: www.officialchip.com

Jahmaal Noel Fyffe (born 26 November 1990), better known by his stage name Chip (formerly Chipmunk), is an English rapper and grime MC. In the past 14 years, he has collaborated with the likes of Skepta, T.I., Meek Mill, Young Adz and many others. In 2009, he released his debut album, I Am Chipmunk, featuring four songs which peaked in the top 10 of the UK Singles Chart, including the chart-topping "Oopsy Daisy". In 2011, Chipmunk released his follow-up album, the American hip-hop-influenced Transition. It included the single "Champion" featuring Chris Brown, which peaked at number two on the UK Singles Chart.

Chip moved to Atlanta in 2012 and signed to T.I.'s Grand Hustle label. On Christmas Day, Chip released "London Boy", featuring the likes of Meek Mill, Skepta, Movado, plus more.

Following his return to London, Chip embarked on a year-long rap beef which solidified his slogan "Chip Can't Run Out of Bars". Following this, he has since released six projects, with his most recent being Grime Scene Saviour featuring the likes of JME, Scorcher, Skepta, Frisco and D Double E among others.

== Early life ==
Jahmaal Noel Fyffe was born on 26 November 1990 in Tottenham, and is the son of Jamaican immigrant parents. Fyffe's parents later separated. Fyffe received the nickname "Chipmunk" from a friend (who was later stabbed to death) on account of him being "short and chubby with big teeth". Fyffe began rapping after hearing Wiley and Dizzee Rascal on pirate radio when he was a child, later inspiring him to rent studios out for £20 to record music with his friends when he was just thirteen years old. Jahmaal attended Highgate Wood Secondary School in Crouch End, before transferring to Gladesmore Community School, citing that there were problems for him at Highgate Wood. After completing secondary school education, he underwent his A-Levels at Haringey Sixth Form Centre, achieving a B in Drama, C in Sociology and D in Critical Thinking.

Chip has been an Arsenal fan since childhood. Prior to a music career, Chip originally aspired to be a footballer.

== Career ==
Like most grime MCs, Fyffe joined musical crews and utilised pirate radio to promote his sound to a wider audience during his breakthrough. He began MCing aged fourteen, and in his early career he associated with Double S's Northumberland Park-based group Shoddy Crew. He first gained mainstream recognition when Wiley brought him to Tim Westwood's radio show in 2007 along with Ice Kid and they performed a freestyle. By 2008, he had his own crew, Circular Movements, alongside fellow MCs Shalo and Hits.

Fyffe signed a record deal with Jive Records of Sony Music UK. He has successfully released eleven top-ten hits on the UK Singles Chart, of which "Oopsy Daisy" debuted at #1. He released his debut album, I Am Chipmunk in 2009, which charted at #2 on the UK Albums Chart. His second album, Transition was released on 18 April 2011.

On 13 January 2012, he announced via Twitter that he had permanently abbreviated his name from "Chipmunk" to "Chip". Fyffe announced his signing to American rapper T.I.'s Grand Hustle Records in March 2012 after leaving Sony following the closing of Jive.

At the start of 2015, Chipmunk announced his two-part Believe & Achieve EP project – with EPisode 1 to be released independently on Monday 4 May via his own label Cash Motto. The EP features productions from New Machine (Plan B) and Chris Loco (Labrinth) as well as collaborations with Irish troubadour Maverick Sabre and grime legends D Double E, Jammer, Stormzy, Kano, Wretch 32 and Shalo.

Chipmunk runs a company called Cash Motto, formerly Cash Motivation, which he uses to release his music and clothing. The company has also released numerous singles by Chipmunk's friend and frequent collaborator Shalo. In 2016, he won Best Grime Act at the MOBO Awards 2016.

=== 2006–2010: I Am Chipmunk and UK breakthrough ===
In 2006, at the age of sixteen, he uploaded the song "Who Are You?" which received a lot of underground success and has reached over 3,000,000 views on YouTube. At the 2008 Mobo Awards, Chipmunk won the Best Newcomer Award while being signed to an independent label, Alwayz Recordings. Soon after, in late-2008, just before his eighteenth birthday, Chipmunk signed a high-figure record deal with Columbia Records, Sony Music and began recording his debut album. On 2 March 2009, he released his first single from the album, "Chip Diddy Chip". The single charted at #21 on the UK Singles Charts and was written by himself. The music video for the track featured Tim Westwood and Dappy of N-Dubz, and was filmed at his old secondary school, Gladesmore Community School. After the release of the single, he announced his album would be titled, I Am Chipmunk. Following the release of "Diamond Rings" which featured guest vocals from Emeli Sandé. The song became Sandé's and Chipmunk's first top 10 hit, after it charted at #6 on the UK Singles Charts. This made Chipmunk a pioneer in doing so, as he became the youngest UK rapper to ever score a top 10 charted song.

In October 2009, Chipmunk released his biggest track to date "Oopsy Daisy" as the third official single. It featured guest vocals from singer Dayo Olatunji and was written by Talay Riley. "Oopsy Daisy" is Chipmunk's most successful single to date. The track debuted at #1 on the UK Singles Charts and later gained a certification of Gold, by the BPI. Chipmunk became the youngest rapper to have scored a UK #1 single. The track was Chipmunk's first single released internationally. The song was accompanied by a music video, Chipmunk's love interest was played by Red Madrell, a British actress. The song beat British girl-group, The Saturdays to number-one with their come-back single, "Forever Is Over", and spent over a month in the top 10. After the release of I Am Chipmunk on 12 October 2009, it gained mainly positive reviews from critics. It debuted at #2 on the UK Albums Chart. However, the album charted at #1 on the UK R&B Albums Chart.

Chipmunk announced that he was going to release a platinum edition of the album with new tracks after I am Chipmunk sold over 300,000 copies. The first single released from I Am Chipmunk was "Until You Were Gone" which featured guest vocals from Esmée Denters. The single charted at #3 on the UK Singles Charts. I Am Chipmunk: The Platinum Edition was released on 3 May 2010. It contained four new songs. The album then gained a Platinum Certification by the BPI. After making a gross income of £1,550,000 the previous year, making him the highest-paid UK rapper. Chipmunk also performed at the Mobo Awards in 2009, Capital Summertime Ball in 2010 at Wembley Stadium and at the Brit Awards.

=== 2010–11: Transition and "Champion" featuring Chris Brown ===
Chipmunk announced he was working on a new studio album in late-2010, and confirmed it would be titled, Transition which he stated it would be different from the first album, stating: "It kinda represents the growth in me as a person since my last album, so the sound has matured as well as I have and that’s the main thing for me with the record - I just wanted the sound, the sound and the feel of the album to feel… I feel like a granddad but you know, just more mature than my first album, you know life’s changed." The album features American artists Keri Hilson, Chris Brown, Trey Songz and Kalenna Harper from Diddy-Dirty Money, and British rapper Wretch 32. He released a promotional single onto iTunes on 12 November 2010. The single charted at #72 on the UK Singles Charts, with limited promotion. In early-2011, he confirmed that "Champion" would be released as the first mainstream single from the album, and the single would feature Chris Brown. The single was written by Harmony "H-Money" Samuels, Jahmaal Fyffe, Eric Bellinger, Erika Nuri. The single charted at #2 on the UK Singles Charts, being held off the top spot by Jessie J and B.o.B with their entry with "Price Tag". However, both songs sold over 90,000 copies in their first week and Jessie J gained the top spot by 5%. The song serves as the theme for the reality competition show WWE Tough Enough. It was announced that "In the Air" would be released as the second mainstream single released from Transition the single would feature guest vocals from American R&B singer, Keri Hilson. The single was released on 11 March 2011. The album Transition itself attained its UK release through Sony Music's Jive label on 18 April 2011. He makes a cameo appearance in Wretch 32 and Example's video for Unorthodox.

The third single to be released from the album is titled "Take Off" and features Trey Songz. Chipmunk also released a net video for the song "Every Gyal" featuring Mavado. In August 2011, Chipmunk performed a free concert in Dumfries, Scotland and in Wales.

=== 2012–14: Grand Hustle and London Boy Mixtape ===
On 7 October 2011, RCA Music Group announced it was disbanding Jive Records, along with Arista Records and J Records. With the shutdown, Chip, and all other artists previously signed to these three labels, had the option to release their future material on the RCA Records brand. Chip chose not to do so, and certain media outlets speculated that he may be dropped from the label. However, Chip instead decided to sign with Grand Hustle, the label of fellow rapper and collaborator, T.I. In December 2011, Chipmunk announced that he would be shortening his stage name to "Chip", under the advice and instruction of T.I., and that all of his future releases would appear under his new stage name.

In January 2012, Chip announced via his official Twitter account that he had been working with Sean Garrett and T.I. on his next project, but did not reveal the name of the project in question. He also posted a picture of himself recording in a studio in Atlanta with T.I. Shortly after the announcement, Chip revealed that throughout the year, he would be posting a series of online video blogs to keep his fans updated on what he was up to. On 10 February 2012, Chip uploaded his own freestyle version of fellow rapper Tyga's smash hit, "Rack City" to his official YouTube account. The video received over 70,000 views and 10,000 likes within the first 48 hours of release.

Chip returned to the studio to complete recording on the project during August–September 2012, before unveiling his single "Londoner", a collaboration with Wretch 32, Professor Green and Loick Essien. The track was released as the project's third underground single on 25 November 2012. On 9 October 2012, Chip was featured on the annual BET Hip Hop Awards cypher, alongside his Grand Hustle labelmates Iggy Azalea, B.o.B, T.I. and Trae tha Truth. On 10 December, Chip revealed the track listing of the mixtape, including collaborations with labelmates Iggy Azalea, Trae Tha Truth, T.I, previous collaborators Skepta, Mavado, Wretch 32 and Professor Green as well as Meek Mill and Young Jeezy. He also re-confirmed the release date of 25 December 2012, and revealed the tape would be available to download free of charge.

=== 2014–present: Believe & Achieve, Grime Beef & League of My Own II ===
On 31 October 2014, Chip dropped his "Fright Night" freestyle on YouTube, and announced to fans that his new project Believe & Achieve would be coming in 2015. In November 2014, Chip collaborated with hotly tipped Stormzy and Shalo on "I’m Fine" which he filmed on his twenty-fourth birthday and released shortly afterwards. A remix of "I’m Fine" featuring Frisco, Krept and Konan appeared online on 16 January 2015 via i-D Magazine. On 1 January 2015, Chip dropped the track ‘School of Grime’ via his SoundCloud page, and followed by a music video a couple weeks later. The track featured grime legends D Double E and Jammer and instantly started blowing up at specialist radio, online and across the urban world for weeks. After the success of the original song "School of Grime" featuring D Double E and Jammer, Chip released a remix blended with UK Garage classic,"The Streets - Has It Come to This" and it was accompanied by a new music video which contained footage of a live performance at student event, Rampage. [6]

On Saturday 24 January, Chip appeared for the second time on Charlie Sloth's trademark show Fire In The Booth on 1Xtra, which had a huge listenership and was trending on Twitter. In Chip's freestyle, he opened up some questions about the UK rap scene and caused controversy by calling out Tinie Tempah for his current lack of commitment to music. The YouTube video from Fire In The Booth instantly went viral with 100k views in just a few days, and was followed by a 1Xtra debate which also trended on Twitter. Chip also took part in ITV's new entertainment show Get Your Act Together on 25 January, having been invited by the Shaolin Monks to learn Kung Fu martial arts. The performance culminated in him balancing on two spear points to widespread audience acclaim. He competed against three other celebrity teams and won the round. Chip performed with the Shaolin Monks in the final of the show on 22 February 2015

A remix freestyle of ‘School of Grime’ was organically conceived by Chip, D Double E and Jammer in the back of a cab after the official video shoot. Using The Streets' ‘Has It Come To This’ as the beat, a freestyle was filmed in one take by a camera phone was shot and then uploaded to YouTube. The track was then recorded properly in the studio and premiered via Pigeons and Planes on 21 February A week later, a visual for the remix was made by legendary Risky Roadz and hosted on SBTV channel.

On 20 March 2015, Chip released a freestyle ‘Pepper Riddim’ hitting back at 5 Rappers who had dissed him since his Fire In The Booth. ‘The End’ was then filmed in one take and released to put an end to the negativity coming from fellow artists in the grime scene, and to look forward to the next chapter of Chip with a positive outlook.

On Christmas Day 2015, Chip released his tenth mixtape, Rap vs. Grime, for free download. The project, which features a guest appearance from Stormzy, consists of remixes of hit songs from 2015 such as "My Way" and "Classic Man" (the "rap" songs) and diss tracks aimed at Tinie Tempah and Bugzy Malone (the "grime" songs). Also on Christmas Day 2015, Chip released "Hear Dis" featuring Stormzy.

Afters six years since the release of his last album, Chip released his third album; and his first independent album, League of My Own II. This album charted at #12 in the UK album charts which is his third Top 20 album.

Chip's fourth studio album Ten10 was released on 21 September 2018 through his independent record label Cash Motto. It featured singles CRB Check ft Not3s, Right Now ft JME & Frisco & the lead single My Girl ft Red Rat.

In March 2020, Chip announced a surprise album with fellow rappers Skepta and Young Adz. Insomnia debuted in at number 3 in the official UK charts with 2 top 40 singles.

Chip released a tribute for longtime friend and collaborator Black the Ripper who died on 4 April 2020. The single titled "0420" was released on 20 April 2020 and sampled Black the Ripper's single "Missing You".

== Feuds ==
=== Tinie Tempah ===
In 2015, Chip appeared on Charlie Sloth's radio show where he called out fellow London based rapper Tinie Tempah over the latter's interests and perceived exploitation of their relationship for personal benefit. On 9 October 2015 he released "96 Bars of Revenge" in which he dissed both Tempah and Bugzy Malone. He then followed this up with "Coward", which was aimed directly at Tempah.

=== Bugzy Malone ===
Bugzy Malone released his "Fire in the Booth", a freestyle session hosted by BBC 1Xtra presenter Charlie Sloth, on 14 March 2015, mentioning Chip. Chip replied to Malone's critics including him on his war dub "Pepper Riddim". This started the feud and drew attention to the grime scene early on in 2015. Malone released a war dub for Chip entitled "Relegation Riddim", travelling to Chip's hometown of Tottenham to film the video for the song.

Five months later, Chip released a number of tracks in his defence starting with "Light Work" on 11 September 2015. He then went on to release "Run Out Riddim" and "Hat Trick" in the same week. These three riddems was all uploaded on three different prominent UK platforms one after the other. GRMdaily, Link Up tv and SBTV. Around a month later on 9 October 2015 he released "96 Bars of Revenge" in which he dissed both Malone and Tinie Tempah. The rivalry continued as Malone then replied back with "Wasteman", Chip replied within 7 hours with "Dickhead", Malone then released the pre-recorded track "Zombie Riddim" via his Twitter account straight after "Dickhead" was uploaded. Malone stated that he would clash with Chip on Lord of the Mics, a battle rap show hosted by Boy Better Know member Jammer, for the right amount of money, and Chip has also stated that he would be willing as long as he would be clashing against both Malone and Tempah.

=== Yungen ===
This feud started when Chip mentioned Yungen in "96 Bars of Revenge". Yungen replied the following year on his track "Comfy", which sparked the feud further. On 19 February 2016, Chip released "One Take" (freestyle) on his YouTube channel, dissing Yungen. Yungen released a pre-recorded track one hour later titled "Punk (Shitmunk Diss)" which was a warning to Chip to take his freestyle down. Chip replied in 24 hours with "Michelle Riddim", a diss track towards Yungen and Tinie Tempah. Yungen responded quickly with "Oopsy Daisy Riddim", and Chip has since responded once again with "L (Lil' Clive Diss 2)". Recently the 'Oopsy Daisy Riddim (Shitmunk Diss) was taken down from YouTube after it contained a sample of Chipmunk's single "Oopsy Daisy", it was then re-loaded, this time with the copyrighted audio removed. After Yungen was filmed running from a man who gripped the rapper's arms, dropping his Nando's meal in the process, he released the track "Away Games". In response to a couple of slights from the track, Chip released his track "Peri Peri Sauce", aimed at the South London rapper.

=== Stormzy ===
Chip became embroiled in a feud with fellow musician Stormzy, releasing diss tracks 'Killer MC' and 'Flowers' in October 2020. This was in response to an incident in June, where Stormzy had entered his apartment block, argued with his family and refused to leave. In January 2021, artist Ghetts released a track called "Skengman" featuring Stormzy where Stormzy referenced Chip on a number of lines. Soon after, Chip released a track called "10 Commandments", addressing Stormzy. July 2021 fellow artist Dave released a track called "Clash" featuring Stormzy where Stormzy briefly addressed the previous incident. Hours later Chip released an audio track entitled "Clash?" where he responded mainly to Stormzy but also referenced Dave in the response.

== Filmography ==
- 2007: Steal This Film: Part II

== Discography ==
Studio albums

- I Am Chipmunk (2009)
- Transition (2011)
- League of My Own II (2017)
- Ten10 (2018)
- Grime Scene Saviour (2025)

Collaborative albums

- Insomnia (with Skepta and Young Adz) (2020)
- Neighbourhood (with Nafe Smallz) (2024)

== Awards and nominations ==
In 2008, Fyffe was nominated for best newcomer at the MOBO Awards, winning two awards: Best UK Newcomer and Best Hip-Hop act. He also won Best Hip-Hop Act at the MOBO Awards 2009. He also won an award with Emeli Sandé for Best British Single for their song "Diamond Rings". The same year, Fyffe won an MP3 Award at the MP3 Music Awards 2009 for "Diamond Rings", which was published and promoted by MTV Network.

Year	Award	Category	Nominated work	Result
2008	MOBO Awards	Best UK Newcomer		Won
2009	MOBO Awards	Best Hip-Hop Act		Won
2009	MP3 Music Awards	The UGG Award – Urban / Garage / Grime	"Diamond Rings"	Won
2016	MOBO Awards	Best Grime Act		Won
2017	MOBO Awards	Best Male Act		Nominated
2017	MOBO Awards	Best Grime Act		Nominated
2021	MOBO Awards	Best Grime Act		Nominated
2025	MOBO Awards	Best Grime Act		Nominated
2026	DJ Mag Best of British Awards	Best Rap Track	"Through Ball" (Silencer featuring Chip, Kruz Leone, Hitman Hyper, Bruza, Frisco, Jme, P Money and D Double E)	

=== Urban Music Awards ===
Year	Award	Category	Nominated work	Result
2008	Urban Music Awards	Best Newcomer		Won
2011	Urban Music Awards	Best Collaboration	Champion with Chris Brown	Won
