= Sugababes discography =

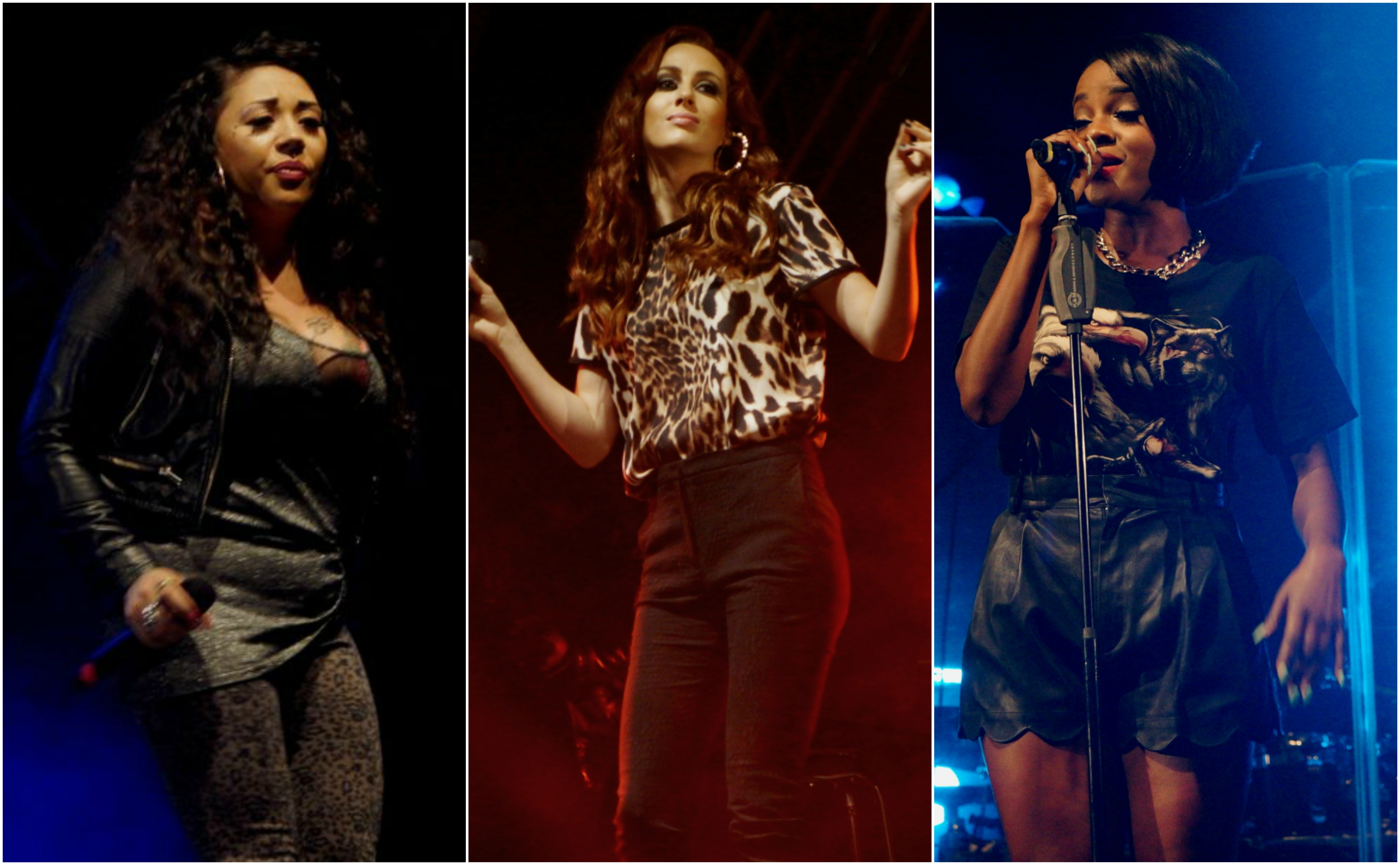
- The original and current lineup of Sugababes
- Studio albums: 9
- Extended plays: 4
- Compilation albums: 4
- Singles: 34
- Video albums: 2
- Music videos: 33
- Other appearances: 12
- Promotional singles: 7

British girl group Sugababes have released nine studio albums, four compilation albums, four extended plays, thirty-four singles (three as featured artists), two video albums, seven promotional singles and thirty-three music videos in four line-up permutations. Sugababes were formed in 1998 and, at various times, featured three vocalists from Siobhán Donaghy, Mutya Buena, Keisha Buchanan, Heidi Range, Amelle Berrabah, and Jade Ewen.

Sugababes' debut album, One Touch, was released in November 2000 and peaked at number twenty-six on the UK chart, eventually earning gold certification. One Touch produced four singles, three of which reached the top twenty, while the album's lead single "Overload" was nominated for a BRIT Award for Best British Single. The album's sales did not meet the expectations of London Records and the group was subsequently dropped. Donaghy left the group in August 2001 and was replaced by former Atomic Kitten member Heidi Range. The group's second album Angels with Dirty Faces was released in August 2002 through Island Records. Influenced by the new wave, dance, and pop music of the 1980s, the record enjoyed success in the UK where it reached number two and went triple platinum. It produced the number one singles "Freak Like Me" and "Round Round", and nominated for Best British Album at the 2003 BRIT Awards.

Three, Sugababes' third album, was released in October 2003. It reached number three and was certified double platinum in the UK. The album produced four singles, including the number one "Hole in the Head". The group's fourth album Taller in More Ways, released in October 2005, reached number one and went triple platinum in the UK. It produced three internationally successful singles, "Push the Button", "Ugly" and "Red Dress". Shortly following the album's release, Buena left the group for personal reasons, and was replaced by Amelle Berrabah. The group's fifth album Change was released in October 2007. The album, composed of pop and dance songs, reached number one and went platinum in the UK. Change produced three top twenty singles, including "Change", "Denial", and the UK number one "About You Now", signalling the second occasion in which the band were simultaneously number one on the UK album, single, download and airplay charts.

The group's sixth studio album, Catfights and Spotlights was released in 2008, and charted in the top ten of the UK Albums Chart. Two singles were released from the album, including "Girls" and "No Can Do", the former peaking at number three on the UK Singles Chart. The band's seventh studio album Sweet 7 was released in March 2010 featuring the lead single "Get Sexy", which peaked at number two on the UK Singles Chart; it was the last single to feature Keisha Buchanan. The second single from the album, "About a Girl", peaked at number eight in the UK, and was the first single to feature new member Jade Ewen. "Wear My Kiss", the album's third single, peaked at number seven in the UK.

On 11 May 2021, Sugababes released a reworking of 2001 single "Run for Cover", featuring MNEK, to celebrate 20 years of One Touch and plans for new music. On 24 December 2022, Sugababes surprise-released the album The Lost Tapes online. The album consisted of songs intended for their 2013 reunion album which was never released due to legal and rights issues.

== Albums ==
=== Studio albums ===
List of albums, with selected chart positions and certifications
Title	Album details	Peak chart positions										Sales	Certifications
Title	Album details	UK	AUT	DEN	GER	IRE	NLD	NZ	NOR	SWE	SWI	Sales	Certifications
One Touch	Released: 27 November 2000; Label: London; Formats: CD, cassette, LP, digital download, streaming	18 (Note: "One Touch", released in November 2000, reached a peak of number 26 on the UK Album Chart in April 2001. Upon the release of the deluxe anniversary edition, released in October 2021, the album reached a new peak of number 18 on the UK Album Chart, and number 1 on the UK Independent Albums Chart.)	6	—	7	55	—	16	—	—	8	UK: 226,000	BPI: Gold
Angels with Dirty Faces	Released: 26 August 2002; Label: Island; Formats: CD, cassette, LP, digital download, streaming	2	19	37	13	3	12	21	11	49	13	UK: 929,000	BPI: 3× Platinum; IFPI SWI: Gold; NVPI: Gold; IFPI: Platinum
Three	Released: 27 October 2003; Label: Island; Formats: CD, cassette, digital download, streaming	3	21	39	10	9	4	45	22	54	9		BPI: 2× Platinum; BVMI: Gold; IFPI SWI: Gold; IFPI: Platinum
Taller in More Ways	Released: 10 October 2005/ 27 February 2006 (re-issued version); Label: Island; Formats: CD, cassette, LP, digital download, streaming	1	5	32	11	7	10	16	30	23	6	UK: 900,000	BPI: 3× Platinum; BVMI: Gold; IFPI AUT: Gold; IFPI DEN: Gold; IFPI SWI: Gold; IRMA: 2× Platinum; RMNZ: Gold; IFPI: Platinum
Change	Released: 8 October 2007; Label: Island; Formats: CD, digital download, streaming	1	32	—	33	10	69	—	—	—	14		BPI: Platinum; IRMA: Platinum
Catfights and Spotlights	Released: 17 October 2008; Label: Island; Formats: CD, digital download, streaming	8	—	—	—	18	—	—	—	—	—		BPI: Gold
Sweet 7	Released: 15 March 2010; Label: Island (#2727295); Formats: CD, digital download, streaming	14	—	—	—	35	—	—	—	—	92		
The Lost Tapes	Released: 24 December 2022; Label: Sacred Three; Formats: LP, digital download, streaming	150 (Note: "The Lost Tapes" reached a peak of number 2 on the UK Album Downloads chart, number 5 on the Record Store Chart and number 7 on the UK Independent Albums Chart.)	—	—	—	—	—	—	—	—	—		
Sugababes	Released: 12 February 2027; Label: Sacred Three; The Orchard; Formats: CD, cassette, LP, digital download, streaming	To be released											
"—" denotes a title that did not chart, or was not released in that territory.

=== Compilation albums ===
List of albums, with selected chart positions and certifications
Title	Album details	Peak chart positions									Certifications
Title	Album details	UK	AUT	DEN	GER	IRE	NLD	NOR	POR	SWI	Certifications
Overloaded: The Singles Collection	Released: 13 November 2006; Label: Island; Formats: CD, digital download, DVD	3	25	34	38	12	37	21	15	29	BPI: 2× Platinum; IFPI DEN: Gold; IRMA: Platinum
The Best of the Bs	Released: 11 April 2011; Label: Island; Formats: Digital download	—	—	—	—	—	—	—	—	—	
The Complete Bs	Released: 11 April 2011; Label: Island; Formats: Digital download	—	—	—	—	—	—	—	—	—	
The Essential Sugababes	Released: 1 October 2021; Label: Spectrum; Formats: CD	—	—	—	—	—	—	—	—	—	
"—" denotes albums that did not chart or were not released

== Extended plays ==
List of extended plays, with selected details
Title	Extended play details
Sessions@AOL	Released: 1 June 2004; Label: Island; Formats: Digital download
Live from London	Released: 13 December 2005; Label: Island; Formats: Digital download
Napster Live Sessions	Released: November 2006; Label: Island; Formats: Digital download
Live at O2 Music Flash	Released: 1 June 2007; Label: Island; Formats: Digital download
Apple Music Home Sessions	Released: 8 March 2023; Label: Independent; Formats: Digital download

== Singles ==
=== As lead artist ===
List of singles as lead artist, with selected chart positions and certifications
Title	Year	Peak chart positions										Certifications	Album
Title	Year	UK	AUS	AUT	DEN	GER	IRE	NLD	NZ	SWI	US	Certifications	Album
"Overload"	2000	6	27	3	—	3	15	14	2	5	—	BPI: Silver; BVMI: Gold	One Touch
"New Year"	2000	12	—	—	—	—	25	—	—	—	—		One Touch
"Run for Cover"	2001	13	36	38	—	28	35	33	49	36	—		One Touch
"Soul Sound"	2001	30	—	—	—	—	—	—	—	—	—		One Touch
"Freak Like Me"	2002	1	44	22	13	27	2	23	25	11	—	BPI: Gold	Angels with Dirty Faces
"Round Round"	2002	1	13	8	3	15	2	2	2	4	—	BPI: Gold; ARIA: Gold; RMNZ: Gold	Angels with Dirty Faces
"Stronger"	2002	7	34	41	11	38	13	5	24	23	—	BPI: Silver	Angels with Dirty Faces
"Angels with Dirty Faces"	2002	7	34	—	—	—	—	—	24	—	—	BPI: Silver	Angels with Dirty Faces
"Shape"	2003	11	75	50	—	39	9	7	—	40	—		Angels with Dirty Faces
"Hole in the Head"	2003	1	25	5	1	9	2	2	11	8	96	BPI: Silver	Three
"Too Lost in You"	2003	10	31	26	17	14	13	8	31	8	—	BPI: Platinum; RMNZ: Gold	Three
"In the Middle"	2004	8	33	33	—	29	13	7	—	23	—		Three
"Caught in a Moment"	2004	8	—	56	—	71	28	30	—	56	—		Three
"Push the Button"	2005	1	3	1	3	2	1	3	1	3	—	BPI: 2× Platinum; ARIA: Platinum; BVMI: Gold; IFPI AUT: Gold; IFPI DEN: Platinum; RMNZ: 2× Platinum	Taller in More Ways
"Ugly"	2005	3	13	14	4	26	7	7	5	19	—	BPI: Silver	Taller in More Ways
"Red Dress"	2006	4	22	41	—	27	12	7	16	31	—		Taller in More Ways
"Follow Me Home"	2006	32	—	—	—	—	25	—	—	—	—		Taller in More Ways
"Easy"	2006	8	—	23	13	26	18	45	—	30	—		Overloaded: The Singles Collection
"Walk This Way" (with Girls Aloud)	2007	1	—	—	—	—	14	—	—	—	—		Non-album single
"About You Now"	2007	1	57	4	12	4	2	18	18	21	—	BPI: 2× Platinum; BVMI: Gold; IFPI DEN: Gold; RMNZ: Platinum	Change
"Change"	2007	13	—	—	—	32	21	31	—	—	—		Change
"Denial"	2008	15	—	4	40	11	18	61	—	14	—		Change
"Girls"	2008	3	—	—	—	—	12	—	—	—	—	BPI: Silver	Catfights and Spotlights
"No Can Do"	2008	23	—	—	—	—	—	—	—	—	—		Catfights and Spotlights
"Get Sexy"	2009	2	75	72	—	41	3	—	—	—	—	BPI: Silver	Sweet 7
"About a Girl"	2009	8	—	—	—	—	14	—	—	—	—	BPI: Silver	Sweet 7
"Wear My Kiss"	2010	7	—	—	—	—	9	—	—	—	—		Sweet 7
"Flatline" (as Mutya Keisha Siobhan) (Note: At its time of original release in 2013, the original line up of the Sugababes released the song under the name Mutya Keisha Siobhan. Do not add flatline again as Sugababes as they did not release it as a single again it was purely re-released under the sugababes name for streaming)	2013	50	—	—	—	—	14	—	—	—	—		Non-album singles
"When the Rain Comes"	2023	— (Note: "When the Rain Comes" did not enter the UK Singles Chart Top 100 but debuted and peaked at number 12 on the UK Singles Downloads Chart on 22 September 2023.)	—	—	—	—	—	—	—	—	—		Non-album singles
"Situation" (with A Little Sound)	2024	— (Note: "Situation" did not enter the UK Singles Chart Top 100 but debuted at number 82 on the UK Singles Downloads Chart on 12 September 2024.)	—	—	—	—	—	—	— (Note: "Situation" did not enter the NZ Top 40 Singles Chart, but peaked at number 38 on the NZ Hot Singles Chart.)	—	—		Non-album singles
"Jungle"	2025	— (Note: "Jungle" did not enter the UK Singles Chart Top 100, but debuted at number 15 on both the UK Singles Sales and Singles Downloads Charts.)	—	—	—	—	—	—	—	—	—		Sugababes
"Weeds"	2025	— (Note: "Weeds" did not enter the UK Singles Chart Top 100, but debuted at number 39 on the UK Singles Downloads Chart and at number 41 on the UK Singles Sales Chart.)	—	—	—	—	—	—	—	—	—		Sugababes
"Shook"	2025	— (Note: "Shook" did not enter the UK Singles Chart Top 100, but debuted at number 12 on the UK Singles Downloads Chart and at number 13 on the UK Singles Sales Chart.)	—	—	—	—	—	—	—	—	—		Sugababes
"Ghost"	2026	— (Note: "Ghost" did not enter the UK Singles Chart Top 100, but debuted at number 22 on the UK Singles Sales Chart, and at number 19 on the UK Singles Downloads Chart.)	—	—	—	—	—	—	—	—	—		Sugababes
"Love Language"	2026	—	—	—	—	—	—	—	—	—	—		Sugababes
"—" denotes single that did not chart or was not released in that territory.

=== As featured artist ===
List of singles as featured artist, with selected chart positions
Title	Year	Peak chart positions										Album
Title	Year	UK	UK Dance	AUS	DEN	GER	IRE	NLD	NZ	NOR	SWI	Album
"Do They Know It's Christmas?" (as part of Band Aid 20)	2004	1	—	9	1	7	1	3	1	1	7	Non-album single
"Sing" (Annie Lennox featuring various artists)	2007	161	—	—	—	—	—	—	—	—	—	Songs of Mass Destruction
"Flowers" (DJ Spoony featuring Sugababes)	2019	— (Note: "Flowers" did not enter the UK Singles Chart, but peaked at number 20 on the UK Singles Downloads Chart.)	26	—	—	—	—	—	—	—	—	Garage Classical

=== Promotional singles ===
Title	Year	Album
"Don't Wanna Wait"	2001	One Touch
"My Love Is Pink"	2007	Change
"Santa Baby"	2009	Non-album singles
"Freedom"	2011	Non-album singles
"Flatline"	2022	The Lost Tapes
"Joy (Push the Button)" (with Joy Anonymous)	2023	Non-album singles
"Round" (with Two Shell)	2024	Non-album singles

== Other charted songs ==
List of non-single songs that have charted
Title	Year	Peak chart positions	Album
Title	Year	UK Down.	Album
"Back to Life"	2023	49	The Lost Tapes
"Only You"	2023	58	The Lost Tapes
"Breathe Me"	2023	62	The Lost Tapes

== Guest appearances ==
Title	Year	Album/Single	Notes
"Killer"	2002	NME in Association with War Child Presents 1 Love	Originally by Adamski
"Please Can I Talk?"	2003	Jack O the Green (Small World Big Band Friends 3)	Recorded with Jools Holland
"Come Together"	2005	B-side to "Ugly"	Originally by The Beatles
"Spiral"	2006	Hello Waveforms	Recorded with William Orbit and Kenna
"Living for the Weekend"	2006	Radio 1's Live Lounge	Originally by Hard-Fi
"I Bet You Look Good on the Dancefloor"	2006	Popjustice: 100% Solid Pop Music	Originally by Arctic Monkeys
"Betcha by Golly Wow!"	2007	Radio 1 Established 1967	Originally by The Stylistics
"Teardrops"	2009	50 Years of Island Records	Originally by Womack & Womack
"For Once in My Life"	2009	My Inspiration	Originally by Stevie Wonder
"Rabbit Heart (Raise It Up)"	2010	Radio 1 Live Lounge	Originally by Florence and the Machine
"Grow a Girl"	2010	Katy Brand vs Sugababes	Recorded for Katy Brand's Big Ass Show on ITV2, "About a Girl" parody
"Flowers"	2019	Garage Classical	DJ Spoony featuring Sugababes
"Nice to Know You"	2025	Fancy Some More?	PinkPantheress featuring Sugababes

== Music videos ==
Title	Year	Director(s)
"Overload"	2000	Phil Poynter
"New Year"	2000	Alex Hemming
"Run for Cover"	2001	Jamie Morgan
"Soul Sound"	2001	Max & Dania
"Freak Like Me"	2002	Sophie Muller and Dawn Shadforth
"Round Round"	2002	Phil Griffin
"Stronger"	2002	Alison Murray
"Angels with Dirty Faces"	2002	Cartoon Network Productions
"Shape"	2003	Michael Gracey and Pete Commins
"Hole in the Head"	2003	Matthew Rolston
"Too Lost in You"	2003	Andy Morahan
"In the Middle"	2004	Matthew Rolston
"Caught in a Moment"	2004	Howard Greenhalgh
"Push the Button"	2005	Matthew Rolston
"Ugly"	2005	Toby Tremlett
"Red Dress"	2006	Tim Royes
"Follow Me Home"	2006	Toby Tremlett
"Easy"	2006	Tim Royes
"Walk This Way"	2007	Trudy Bellinger
"About You Now"	2007	Marcus Adams
"Change"	2007	Fatima Andrade Koehler
"Denial"	2008	Harvey B-Brown
"Girls"	2008	Daniel Wolfe
"No Can Do"	2008	Marco Puig
"Get Sexy"	2009	Emil Nava
"About a Girl"	2009	Martin Weisz
"Wear My Kiss"	2010	Martin Weisz
"Freedom"	2011	Sean de Sparengo
"Flatline"	2013	KT Auletar
"Situation"	2024	Jono Canning
"Jungle"	2025	Dora Paphides
"Weeds"	2025	Gemma Yin
"Shook"	2025	Dora Paphides
"Ghost"	2026	Thomas James
