= Wear My Kiss =

2010 single by Sugababes

Single by Sugababes

from the album Sweet 7
- Released: 21 February 2010
- Recorded: 2009
- Studio: F2 Studios (Hollywood, California)
- Genre: Dance-pop
- Length: 3:06
- Label: Island; Roc Nation
- Songwriters: Fernando Garibay; Bruno Mars; Philip Lawrence; Carlos Battey; Steven Battey
- Producer: Fernando Garibay

Sugababes singles chronology
"About a Girl" (2009)	"Wear My Kiss" (2010)	"Flatline" (2013)

Music videos
- "Wear My Kiss" on YouTube
- "Wear My Kiss" (7th Heaven Remix) on YouTube

"Wear My Kiss" is a song by British girl group Sugababes, released as the third and final single from their seventh studio album, Sweet 7 (2010). It was the final single from the band before they disbanded in 2011. It was written by Fernando Garibay, Bruno Mars, Philip Lawrence, and The Jackie Boyz, and produced by Garibay. The song's development began while the Sugababes travelled to the United States during April 2009, in which they collaborated with various high-profile producers. The song was re-recorded to feature the vocals of Jade Ewen following the departure of Keisha Buchanan in September 2009. "Wear My Kiss" is an uptempo dance-pop song that references the items which compose a man's outfit.

Many critics praised the song as radio-friendly and catchy, although some regarded it as uninspiring and average. The single reached the top ten on the charts in the UK, Ireland and Scotland, and also charted in the Czech Republic and Slovakia. Its music video was directed by Martin Weisz in December 2009. The green screen effect was used to produce the video's scenes, which include clones of the group's members. Critics commended the video for its futuristic concept. The Sugababes performed "Wear My Kiss" at the Fight Cervical Cancer in Style fundraising event, on Eurovision: Your Country Needs You, and at Chester Rocks in 2011.

== Development and composition ==
"Wear My Kiss"
A sample of "Wear My Kiss", which features a chanted 'da-da-da' hook that is evocative of the group's single "Hole in the Head".

The Sugababes travelled Los Angeles and New York City in April 2009 to work on their seventh studio album Sweet 7 (2010). They signed a record deal with Jay Z's record label Roc Nation, which resulted in collaborations with high-profile producers including Stargate and RedOne. "Wear My Kiss" was written by Fernando Garibay, Bruno Mars, Philip Lawrence, Carlos Battey and Steven Battey, the latter two collectively known by their stage name The Jackie Boyz. Garibay produced the song, recorded the Sugababes' vocals, provided the track's instrumentation, and completed its programming and arrangement. The Jackie Boyz provide background vocals for the song. Dave Pensado mixed "Wear My Kiss" at Larrabee Sound Studios in North Hollywood, California; AJ Nunez was the assistant. Additional vocal production was provided by Mike Stevens and Marcus Byrne, while additional vocal mixing was completed by Jeremy Wheatley at TwentyOne Studios, London, with assistance from Richard Edgeler. "Wear My Kiss" was recorded and tracked at F2 Studios in Hollywood, California.

"Wear My Kiss" is a dance-pop song. David Balls of Digital Spy described it "a fuzzed-up pop thumper". The song is composed of "thick" beats, "sexy" verses and "raunchy" lyrics. The chorus features a chanted 'da-da-da' hook, which according to Al Fox of BBC Music is evocative of the group's 2003 single "Hole in the Head". Andy Gill of The Independent noted that the song sees the Sugababes "effectively subjugated to the status of accessories"; lyrically, the singers compare themselves to a [tie, watch and shoes of a man's outfit. During the pre-hook, group member Heidi Range sings, "I"m just a pretty little thing / That'll make you wanna sing / Make you wanna buy a ring". "Wear My Kiss" is reminiscent of songs performed by British girl group Girls Aloud and American recording artist Lady Gaga.

== Release ==
In September 2009, speculation arose that group member Amelle Berrabah had left the Sugababes following reports of tension with band member Keisha Buchanan. However, it was announced on 21 September 2009 that Buchanan, the sole original member of the group, had officially left the Sugababes. Buchanan clarified the departure on her official Twitter account, writing: "I'm sad to say that I am no longer a part of the Sugababes ... Although it was not my choice to leave, it's time to enter a new chapter in my life ... Sometimes a breakdown in communication and lack of trust can result in many different things." Buchanan was replaced by former Eurovision contestant Jade Ewen. As a result of the line-up change, "Wear My Kiss" was re-recorded for the inclusion of vocals from new member Ewen and the removal of vocals from Buchanan.

In October 2009, it was reported that "Wear My Kiss" would be released as the third single from Sweet 7 on 8 February 2010. The song was released in the United Kingdom and Ireland on 21 February 2010 as a digital download, and as a CD single the following day. During an interview with David Balls of Digital Spy, group member Heidi Range explained the reason for the song's release as the album's third single, saying: "It's had a really good response from radio and our fans on the website. It's also quite appropriate as it comes out around Valentine's Day – there's a lot of kissing going on then!" "Wear My Kiss" was remixed by the British music production team 7th Heaven.

== Reception ==
=== Critical response ===
"Wear My Kiss" received mixed reviews from critics. BBC Music's Al Fox described it as "a glimmer of brilliance" amongst the album's other tracks. Alice Wyllie of The Scotsman and David Balls of Digital Spy called the song radio-friendly, while the latter described it as "more comfortably more Sugababes-sounding" than the group's previous two singles, "Get Sexy" and "About a Girl". Balls praised the hook as one that "lodges in your brain like shrapnel". A writer from Daily Record shared a similar opinion, writing: "The big chanted hook won't go away once it's in your head". Andy Gill of The Independent regarded "Wear My Kiss" as one of the album's better tracks and noted that it practices "a craven form of extreme self-objectification". Caroline Sullivan of The Guardian noted that while the album was significantly Americanised, "Wear My Kiss" had "escaped with some quirky Britishness intact". Khaleej Times wrote that the song proves the Sugababes are "feisty and seductive as ever" and elaborated, "the cut-glass industrialism of the backing track belies the dedication of the trio to the permanent touchpoints of pop music".

Johnny Dee of Virgin Media named it one of Sweet 7's standout tracks but in contrary felt that "trimmed of their former member's vocals could be by absolutely anyone". Gavin Martin of Daily Mirror called the song a "sweaty but uninspired thumper". A critic from The Visitor regarded "Wear My Kiss" as "limp" in comparison to the group's older material which he described as "feisty, sassy pop". Fraser McAlpine from BBC Music gave the song a two-out-of-five star rating, and criticised the lack of cohesiveness between the group's vocals, as well as the formulaic nature of the song.

=== Commercial performance ===
"Wear My Kiss" debuted and peaked at number seven on the UK Singles Chart for the issue dated 6 March 2010, with sales of 38,209. It became the group's third consecutive top ten single and eighteenth top ten single overall. Sweet 7 also became the first Sugababes album since Taller in More Ways (2005) to produce three top ten singles. The song debuted and peaked at number nine on the Irish Singles Chart, becoming the Sugababes' ninth top ten single in Ireland. "Wear My Kiss" debuted at number four on the Scottish Singles Chart for the issue dated 6 March 2010. The song debuted and peaked at number 47 on the Czech Singles Chart, where it charted for eight weeks. It was less successful on the Slovak Singles Chart and peaked at number 73. The song's commercial performance throughout Europe allowed it to appear on the European Hot 100 Singles chart, where it peaked at number 27.

== Music video ==
Heidi Range dances with clones of herself during the music video.

The music video for "Wear My Kiss" was directed by Martin Weisz during December 2009. Weisz also directed the music video for the group's previous single "About a Girl". The video for "Wear My Kiss" was expected to premiere in early January 2010, although a preview was released on 11 January 2010 instead. The video was released on the iTunes Store on 12 March 2010. The green screen was used to produce it, in which the Sugababes stood in front of a projection of their computer-generated images. All three members wore similar blue, pink and red dresses. It primarily focuses on Sugababes dancing in front of a crowd of clones of themselves. Ewen discussed the experiences while filming the music video with First News, saying:

It's so cool! On the day we were filming it we just couldn't picture what it was going to be like. We were literally in a room and had to imagine that there’s going to be clones of you – a sea of Sugababes and you're just like: "Oh how are they going to do this?” When you see it back it's really amazing.

The music video begins with Amelle Berrabah singing the first verse, in which objects appear in the background in reference to the lyrics, including a gold tie and silver watch. When Range sings the lines "make you wanna buy a ring" a diamond appears in the background. During the chorus, clones of members of the band appear as they are dancing. During Ewen's verse, her reference to shoes prompts a pair of green high heels to emerge in the background. The group begins dancing together in the chorus while clones of them appear again. The video ends with Sugababes dancing while making hand gesture to represent a "kiss". Ann Lee of Metro described the video as "futuristic". Nick Levine from Digital Spy praised the video as an "absolute cracker".

== Live performances ==
The Sugababes promoted "Wear My Kiss" on 26 January 2010 with three appearances on television. The following day, the trio performed it at the Fight Cervical Cancer in Style concert. A writer from Belfast Telegraph described their performance as "highly energetic". Fight Cervical Cancer in Style, a charity fundraising event, was held at Koko in London by Jo's Trust to raise awareness about the prevalence of cervical cancer among women. Berrabah spoke about the importance of this health issue on stage:

We are so passionate about this cause and would urge girls to reduce their risks of cervical cancer – we had no idea how to prevent cervical cancer and actually we always thought it was genetic but through taking part in this campaign, we now realise it is sexually transmitted. By leading a healthy lifestyle, going for regular smears and having a vaccination you can help to reduce the risks hugely.

The band performed "Wear My Kiss" during a gig in March 2010 at the Supperclub, London. They performed the song on BBC's Eurovision: Your Country Needs You on 12 March 2010. The song was performed immediately prior to the winner of the show being announced. The Sugababes performed "Wear My Kiss" at Chester Rocks on 2 July 2011 as part of a set list, which included their number one singles "Freak like Me", "Hole in the Head" and "Push the Button".

== Track listing ==
- CD single
1. "Wear My Kiss" – 3:44
2. "Wear My Kiss" (7th Heaven Remix) – 7:04
3. "Wear My Kiss" (WAWA Remix) – 5:20
- Digital download
1. "Wear My Kiss" (Edit) – 3:06
2. "Wear My Kiss" (7th Heaven Radio Edit) – 3:35
- Extended play
1. "Wear My Kiss" (7th Heaven Club Mix) – 7:03
2. "Wear My Kiss" (Wawa Remix) – 5:18

== Credits and personnel ==
Recording

- Recorded and tracked at F2 Studios, Hollywood, California

Personnel

- Songwriting – Fernando Garibay, Bruno Mars, Philip Lawrence, Carlos Battey, Steven Battey
- Production – Fernando Garibay
- Vocal recording – Fernando Garibay
- Instrumentation – Fernando Garibay
- Programming – Fernando Garibay
- Arrangement – Fernando Garibay
- Background vocals – Carlos Battey, Steven Battey
- Mixing – Dave Pensado at Larrabee Sound Studios, North Hollywood, California
- Mixing (assistant) – AJ Nunez
- Additional vocal production – Mike Stevens and Marcus Byrne
- Additional vocal mixing – Jeremy Wheatley at TwentyOne Studios, London, England
- Assistant – Richard Edgeler

Credits adapted from the liner notes of Sweet 7, Island Records.

== Charts ==
=== Weekly charts ===
Chart (2010)	Peak position
Czech Republic Airplay (ČNS IFPI)	49
European Hot 100 (Billboard)	27
Ireland (IRMA)	9
Scottish Singles Sales (Official Charts)	4
Slovakia Airplay (ČNS IFPI)	73
UK Singles (Official Charts Company)	7
UK Airplay (Music Week)	5

=== Year-end charts ===
Chart (2010)	Position
UK Singles (Official Charts Company)	175
