= My Man (Jade Ewen song) =

Single by Jade Ewen
- Released: 17 September 2009
- Genre: Pop; R&B
- Length: 3:05
- Label: Polydor
- Songwriter(s): Ina Wroldsen; Harry Sommerdahl; Kalle Engstrom
- Producer(s): Kage Sigurth; Wroldsen; Engstrom

Jade Ewen singles chronology
"It's My Time" (2009)	"My Man" (2009)

"My Man" is a song by English singer Jade Ewen. It was written by Ina Wroldsen, Harry Sommerdahl and Kalle Engstrom, with production by Kage Sigurth, Wroldsen and Engstrom for Ewen's debut studio album. The song was released as a digital download in the United Kingdom on 17 September 2009. Musically, "My Man" is a pop and contemporary R&B and song backed by electro and R&B beats and a synthesizer. It is notably different from her previous single "It's My Time", which was composed by Andrew Lloyd Webber for the Eurovision Song Contest 2009.

"My Man" was positively reviewed by critics, who praised the chorus and Ewen's vocals. The song peaked at number 35 on the UK Singles Chart and number 13 on the UK R&B Chart. The accompanying music video for "My Man" was directed by Urban Strom and filmed in July 2009 in Beverly Hills, near Los Angeles, California. It features Ewen's love interest using a torch to search for her in a mansion. Short after the release of the video and some live performances, Ewen announced she would be joining the Sugababes, replacing founding member Keisha Buchanan and putting her solo career on hold.

== Background and development ==
In January 2009, Ewen participated in the UK national selection for the Eurovision Song Contest 2009. She was eventually selected to represent the UK with the song "It's My Time", composed by Andrew Lloyd Webber who accompanied her on piano onstage. Ewen was placed fifth on the contest, which was the highest placing for the UK since 2002. Having already signed with Polydor Records before the Eurovision selection, Ewen began working on her debut album. "My Man" was written by Ina Wroldsen, and produced by Harry Sommerdahl and Kalle Engstrom.

In September 2009, it was reported that Sugababes member Amelle Berrabah had left the group and Ewen would be replacing her position in the band. Further suspicion arose amid an announcement that Ewen was "taking time off from all promotional activity for the foreseeable future". However, it was announced on 21 September 2009 that founding Sugababes member Keisha Buchanan had left the band.

== Composition and lyrics ==
"My Man" is a pop and R&B song with influences of electro. described by Nick Levine of Digital Spy as a "sassy R&B club banger". The song is notably different from her previous ballad, "It's My Time", featuring a more contemporary R&B sound than the latter. Speaking upon the change in musical direction, Ewen clarified: "What I'm now doing now is really me, [sic] so if people don't like it I'm going to take it more personally." "My Man" opens with electro and bass-driven R&B beats, synthesizers that are reminiscent of those featured in "Yeah!" by Usher, and later develops into "a pop/R&B stormer". The lyrical content of "My Man" is about a woman who "pledges devotion to a man who sounds almost too good to be true". Ewen stated that the lyrics were not directed at any man in particular.

== Reception ==
=== Critical ===
"My Man" received positive reviews from critics. Nick Levine of Digital Spy gave the song a four out of five star rating and called it "very good contemporary pop" and a "complete U-turn" from "It's My Time". Philip Ellwood of Entertainment Focus praised the song's chorus, in addition to Ewen's vocal performance. He also wrote that the end result is "a monster hit waiting to happen and a single that is better than it has any right to be". Oikotimes.com commended the song as "instantly catchy and memorable". Vicki Lutas of BBC described "My Man" as "sexy, strong and ferocious". She applauded the chorus, but admitted that the song "sounds a bit generic" and "lacks Jade's sparkle".

=== Commercial ===
"My Man" debuted and peaked at number 35 on the UK Singles Chart for the issue dated 3 October 2009, and became Ewen's second consecutive top forty single after "It's My Time", which peaked at number 27 earlier in the year. On the UK R&B Chart, "My Man" peaked at number 13.

== Promotion ==
=== Music video ===
A scene of the music video where Ewen is dancing on the porch.

The music video for "My Man" was directed by Urban Strom and produced by Danny Germaine in July 2009 under the production company Fountain of Youth Entertainment. It was shot in a mansion in Beverly Hills, Los Angeles, California. For the video, the singer wore a "clingy" white vest and hotpants. It begins with showing a man who is in bed and cannot sleep. Ewen is later shown in the mansion which prompts the man to turn on the light of a torch, leave the bed and search for her. Ewen then begins dancing on the wall as the torch is being flashed at her by the man. During the second verse, she is shown singing on a couch, again with the torch being flashed. When the song's bridge begins, Ewen is shown dancing outside on the porch where the man is watching her. As the video ends, it is revealed that the man was dreaming, in which Ewen appears near the room's curtains.

The video was well received by critics. A writer from the website Female First described the video as "glamorous".

=== Live performances ===
Ewen first performed "My Man" on BBC Switch on 8 July 2009. She wore a white-coloured shirt, blue jeans and pink high heels. Soon after Ewen joined the Sugababes; she clarified that her solo career would be "put to one side", saying: "The Sugababes is my main project".

== Formats and track listings ==
- Digital single
1. "My Man" (Single Version) – 3:04
2. "My Man" (Cahill Radio Edit) – 3:22
- Extended play (EP)
1. "My Man" (Single Version) – 3:05
2. "My Man" (Cahill Radio Edit) – 3:22
3. "My Man" (feat. Bashy) – 3:05
4. "My Man" (Perempay Radio Edit) – 2:59
5. "My Man" (Perempay Club Mix) – 6:57

== Charts ==
Chart (2009)	Peak position
UK R&B (Official Charts Company)	13
UK Singles (Official Charts Company)	35

== Release history ==
Region	Date	Format	Label
United Kingdom	17 September 2009	Digital download	Polydor Records
United Kingdom	20 September 2009	Extended play	Polydor Records
