= United Kingdom in the Eurovision Song Contest 2009 =

- Eurovision Song Contest 2009
- Participating broadcaster: British Broadcasting Corporation (BBC)
- Country: United Kingdom
- Selection process: Eurovision: Your Country Needs You
- Selection date: 31 January 2009

Competing entry
- Song: "It's My Time"
- Artist: Jade Ewen
- Songwriters: Andrew Lloyd Webber; Diane Warren

Placement
- Final result: 5th, 173 points

Participation chronology

The United Kingdom was represented at the Eurovision Song Contest 2009 with the song "It's My Time", written by Andrew Lloyd Webber and Diane Warren, and performed by Jade Ewen. The British participating broadcaster, the British Broadcasting Corporation (BBC), selected its entry in the contest via the national final Eurovision: Your Country Needs You. Six acts competed in the national final which consisted of two heats, a semi-final and a final, during which the winner was selected entirely through a public televote.

As a member of the "Big Four", the United Kingdom automatically qualified to compete in the final of the Eurovision Song Contest. Performing in position 23, the United Kingdom placed 5th out of the 25 participating countries with 173 points.

== Background ==
Prior to the 2009 contest, the British Broadcasting Corporation (BBC) had participated in the Eurovision Song Contest representing the United Kingdom fifty-one times. Thus far, it has won the contest five times: in 1967 with the song "Puppet on a String" performed by Sandie Shaw, in 1969 with the song "Boom Bang-a-Bang" performed by Lulu, in 1976 with the song "Save Your Kisses for Me" performed by Brotherhood of Man, in 1981 with the song "Making Your Mind Up" performed by Bucks Fizz, and in 1997 with the song "Love Shine a Light" performed by Katrina and the Waves. To this point, the nation is noted for having finished as the runner-up in a record fifteen contests. Up to and including 1998, the UK had only twice finished outside the top 10, in 1978 and 1987. Since 1999, the year in which the rule was abandoned that songs must be performed in one of the official languages of the country participating, the UK has had less success, thus far only finishing within the top ten once: in 2002 with the song "Come Back" performed by Jessica Garlick. For the 2008 contest, the United Kingdom finished in twenty-fifth place (last) out of twenty-five competing entries with the song "Even If" performed by Andy Abraham.

As part of its duties as participating broadcaster, the BBC organises the selection of its entry in the Eurovision Song Contest and broadcasts the event in the country. Despite calls from the leader of the Conservative Party David Cameron for a withdrawal due to the 2008 South Ossetia war, the broadcaster announced that it would participate in the 2009 contest on 28 May 2008. BBC has traditionally organised a national final featuring a competition among several artists and songs to choose the British entry for Eurovision. For their 2009 entry, the broadcaster announced that a national final involving a public vote would be held to select United Kingdom's entry.

== Before Eurovision ==
=== Eurovision: Your Country Needs You 2009 ===
Eurovision: Your Country Needs You 2009 was the national final developed by the BBC in order to select the British entry for the Eurovision Song Contest 2009. Six acts competed over four televised shows between 10 and 31 January 2009 held at the BBC Television Centre in London and hosted by Graham Norton. All shows in the national final were broadcast on BBC One as well as streamed online via the broadcaster's website bbc.co.uk.

==== Contestants ====
On 18 October 2008, BBC announced an open submission for interested artists to submit their applications in the form of a video recording of themselves performing a cover version of a popular song or a self-written song. Eligible applicants were those being 17 years old by 1 January 2009 and living in a country within the European Economic Area. The submission period lasted until 21 November 2008. The received applications from the open call were reviewed and a shortlist was compiled by BBC producers. Additional applicants were provided to the BBC by casting companies through professional organisations including agents, stage schools, vocal teachers, open mic events, regional print press and radio stations. Candidates from both entry methods were included in a final shortlist which was presented to a professional panel, consisting of Andrew Lloyd Webber (composer of the British song), Colin Barlow (Universal Music representative) and BBC producers, that ultimately selected six contestants to compete in the national final following auditions as well as vocal and staging workshops held in London. The six contestants were announced during an introduction show on 3 January 2009 which covered the background preparation and selection processes of the national final.

==== Results summary ====
Colour key
Contestant received the most public votes
Contestant was in the "danger zone" but saved by Andrew Lloyd Webber
Contestant was in the "danger zone" and eliminated by Andrew Lloyd Webber

Weekly results per act
Act	Heat 1	Heat 2	Semi-final	Final
Jade Ewen	Safe	Safe	Safe	Winner
Francine and Nicola Gleadall	Safe	Safe	Safe	Runner-up
Mark Evans	Safe	Safe	Safe	3rd place
Emperors of Soul	Safe	Safe	Eliminated	Eliminated (Heat 3)
Charlotte Finlay	Safe	Eliminated	Eliminated (Heat 2)	
Damien Flood	Eliminated	Eliminated (Heat 1)		

==== Shows ====
===== Heats =====
Two heats took place on 10 and 17 January 2009. In addition to individual performances, the female contestants together performed the songs "One Rock & Roll Too Many" from Andrew Lloyd Webber's musical Starlight Express in the first heat and "Rhythm of the Night" by DeBarge in the second heat, while the male contestants together performed the songs "No Matter What" by Boyzone in the first heat and "Nothing's Gonna Stop Us Now" by Starship in the second heat. The contestants together also performed the winning song for the United Kingdom in 1976 "Save Your Kisses for Me" by Brotherhood of Man in the second heat. Guest performer in the first heat was Lemar who performed the song "Weight of the World" from his latest album The Reason, while guest performer in the second heat was the group The Saturdays which performed the song "Up" from their latest album.

A panel of experts provided feedback alongside Andrew Lloyd Webber regarding the contestants during the shows. The panel in the first heat consisted of Lulu (Eurovision Song Contest winner for the United Kingdom in 1969 with "Boom Bang-a-Bang") and Arlene Phillips (choreographer, talent scout and television presenter), while the panel in the second heat consisted of Lulu and Duncan James (singer, actor and member of Blue). In each heat a public televote selected two contestants to be up for elimination ("danger zone") and one of them was eliminated by Lloyd Webber.

Heat 1 – 10 January 2009
R/O	Artist	Song (Original artist)	Result
1	Emperors of Soul	"Love Train" (The O'Jays)	Safe
2	Mark Evans	"Your Game" (Will Young)	Safe
3	Charlotte Finlay	"Because of You" (Kelly Clarkson)	"Danger zone"
4	Damien Flood	"How Am I Supposed to Live Without You" (Michael Bolton)	Eliminated
5	Francine and Nicola Gleadall	"You've Got a Friend" (Carole King)	Safe
6	Jade Ewen	"Déjà Vu" (Beyoncé)	Safe

Heat 2 – 17 January 2009
R/O	Artist	Song (Original artist)	Result
1	Francine and Nicola Gleadall	"The Promise" (Girls Aloud)	Safe
2	Emperors of Soul	"Kiss" (Prince)	"Danger zone"
3	Jade Ewen	"The Voice Within" (Christina Aguilera)	Safe
4	Charlotte Finlay	"Rain on Your Parade" (Duffy)	Eliminated
5	Mark Evans	"Me and Mrs. Jones" (Billy Paul)	Safe

===== Semi-final =====
The four remaining contestants competed in the semi-final on 24 January 2009, performing two songs: a ballad and an up-tempo song. In addition to their performances, the female contestants performed the song "I'll Stand by You" by The Pretenders, while the male contestants performed the song "Don't Let the Sun Go Down on Me" by Elton John. Guest performers were Lulu performing the winning song for the United Kingdom in 1969 "Boom Bang-a-Bang" and Alesha Dixon performing the song "Breathe Slow".

A panel of experts provided feedback alongside Andrew Lloyd Webber regarding the contestants during the show. The panel consisted of Dixon and Emma Bunton (singer-songwriter and actress). A public televote selected two contestants to be up for elimination ("danger zone") and one of them was eliminated by Lloyd Webber.

Semi-final – 24 January 2009
R/O	Artist	First Song (Original artist)	R/O	Second Song (Original artist)	Result
1	Mark Evans	"Rock Your Body" (Justin Timberlake)	5	"I Don't Want to Talk About It" (Rod Stewart)	Safe
2	Jade Ewen	"All by Myself" (Eric Carmen)	6	"Think" (Aretha Franklin)	"Danger zone"
3	Emperors of Soul	"Patience" (Take That)	7	"Uptown Girl" (Billy Joel)	Eliminated
4	Francine and Nicola Gleadall	"About You Now" (Sugababes)	8	"All I Have to Do Is Dream" (The Everly Brothers)	Safe

===== Final =====
The three remaining contestants competed in the final on 31 January 2009, performing three songs which included a previously performed song during the preceding three heats and the British Eurovision song "It's My Time". In addition to their performances, the contestants performed the winning song for the United Kingdom in 1981 "Making Your Mind Up" by Bucks Fizz in a group. Guest performers included Lulu performing the song "Relight My Fire" by Dan Hartman with the eliminated contestants Damien Flood, Charlotte Finlay and Emperors of Soul, and previous Eurovision Song Contest winner Dima Bilan who won the contest for Russia in 2008 with the song "Believe".

A panel of experts provided feedback alongside Andrew Lloyd Webber regarding the contestants during the show. The panel consisted of previous panellists Lulu and Duncan James. A public televote selected Jade Ewen as the winner.

Final – 31 January 2009
R/O	Artist	First Song (Original artist)	R/O	Second Song (Original artist)	R/O	ESC Song	Place
1	Jade Ewen	"Lady Marmalade" (Labelle)	6	"The Promise" (Girls Aloud)	9	"It's My Time"	1
2	Mark Evans	"Try a Little Tenderness" (The Commitments)	5	"Déjà Vu" (Beyoncé)	7	"It's My Time"	3
3	Francine and Nicola Gleadall	"Sweet About Me" (Gabriella Cilmi)	4	"Me and Mrs. Jones" (Billy Paul)	8	"It's My Time"	2

==== Ratings ====
Viewing figures by show
Show	Date	Viewers (in millions)	Share	Ref.
Introduction show	3 January 2009	4.9	21%	
Heat 1	10 January 2009	5	22%	
Heat 2	17 January 2009	4.6	22%	
Semi-final	24 January 2009	4.8	Unknown	
Final	31 January 2009	5.5	30%	

=== Promotion ===
Jade Ewen made several appearances across Europe to specifically promote "It's My Time" as the British Eurovision entry. On 7 February, Jade Ewen performed "It's My Time" during the final of the Maltese Eurovision national final. She also performed the song between 18 February and 7 March during the Greek Eurovision national final, the presentation show of the 2009 Bosnian Eurovision entry, and the Russian and Ukrainian Eurovision national finals. On 18 April, Ewen performed during the Eurovision in Concert event which was held at the Amsterdam Marcanti venue in Amsterdam, Netherlands and hosted by Marga Bult and Maggie MacNeal, and appeared during the RTL 4 programme Life and Cooking. On 3 May, Ewen performed "It's My Time" during Taniec z Gwiazdami, the Polish version of Strictly Come Dancing. Prior to the contest, Ewen was interviewed by Russian magazine OK! which gave away more than 100,000 copies of "It's My Time" to readers from Russia and Ukraine.

In addition to their international appearances, on 17 May, Jade Ewen performed during the UK Eurovision Preview Party, which was held in London, United Kingdom and hosted by Nicki French and Paddy O'Connell. On 1, 2 and 4 May, Ewen appeared on the BBC One programmes Friday Night with Jonathan Ross, Saturday Kitchen and The One Show, respectively.

== At Eurovision ==
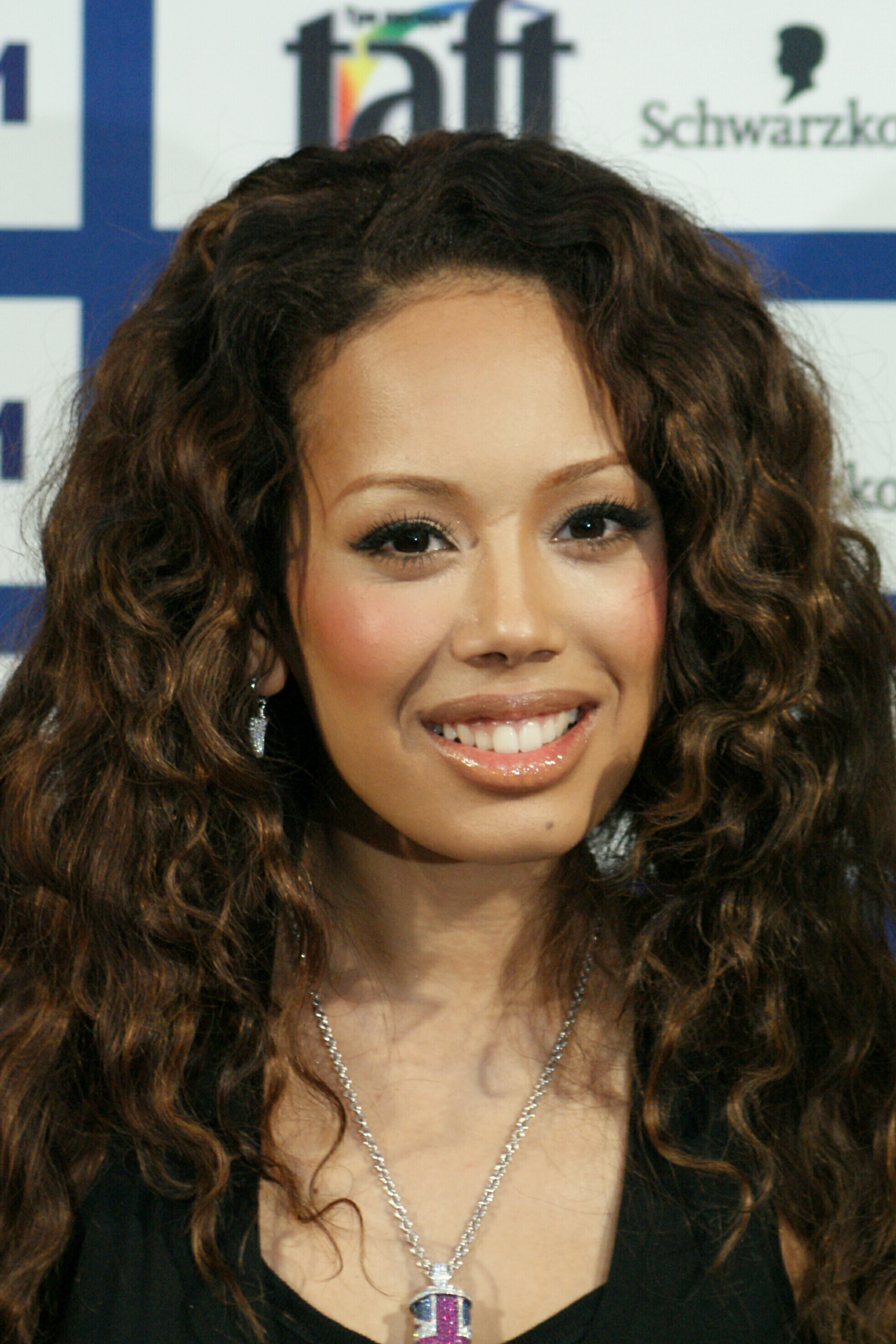
Jade Ewen during a press meet and greet

According to Eurovision rules, all nations with the exceptions of the host country and the "Big Four" (France, Germany, Spain and the United Kingdom) are required to qualify from one of two semi-finals in order to compete for the final; the top nine songs from each semi-final as determined by televoting progress to the final, and a tenth was determined by back-up juries. As a member of the "Big Four", the United Kingdom automatically qualified to compete in the final on 16 May 2009. In addition to their participation in the final, France is also required to broadcast and vote in one of the two semi-finals. During the semi-final allocation draw on 30 January 2009, the United Kingdom was assigned to broadcast and vote in the first semi-final on 12 May 2009.

In the United Kingdom, the semi-finals were broadcast on BBC Three with commentary by Paddy O'Connell and Sarah Cawood, while the final was televised on BBC One with commentary by Graham Norton and broadcast on BBC Radio 2 with commentary by Ken Bruce. Norton replaced Terry Wogan following his retirement as the British commentator since 1980. The British spokesperson, who announced the British votes during the final, was Duncan James.

=== Final ===
Jade Ewen took part in technical rehearsals on 9 and 10 May, followed by dress rehearsals on 15 and 16 May. This included the jury final on 15 May where the professional juries of each country watched and voted on the competing entries. The running order for the semi-finals and final was decided by through another draw on 16 March 2009 and the United Kingdom was subsequently placed to perform in position 23, following the entry from Romania and before the entry from Finland.

The British performance featured Jade Ewen on stage with the LED screens displaying white chandeliers. Ewen made her entrance on a staircase in the middle of the stage with four violinists dressed in black tailcoats and bow ties, and was later joined by the co-composer of "It's My Time" Andrew Lloyd Webber who played the piano. The singer wore a dress designed by designer Amanda Wakeley during the performance, which was choreographed by Arlene Philips. The performance also featured smoke effects. The United Kingdom placed fifth in the final, scoring 173 points.

=== Voting ===
The voting system for 2009 involved each country awarding points from 1–8, 10 and 12, with the points in the final being decided by a combination of 50% national jury and 50% televoting. Each nation's jury consisted of five music industry professionals who are citizens of the country they represent. This jury judged each entry based on: vocal capacity; the stage performance; the song's composition and originality; and the overall impression by the act. In addition, no member of a national jury was permitted to be related in any way to any of the competing acts in such a way that they cannot vote impartially and independently.

Following the release of the full split voting by the EBU after the conclusion of the competition, it was revealed that the United Kingdom had placed tenth with the public televote and third with the jury vote in the final. In the public vote, the United Kingdom scored 105 points, while with the jury vote, the United Kingdom scored 223 points.

Below is a breakdown of points awarded to the United Kingdom and awarded by the United Kingdom in the second semi-final and grand final of the contest, and the breakdown of the jury voting and televoting conducted during the two shows:

==== Points awarded to the United Kingdom ====
Points awarded to the United Kingdom (Final)
Score	Country
12 points	Greece
10 points	Ireland; Malta; Portugal; Spain
8 points	Albania; Germany; Serbia
7 points	Armenia; Bulgaria; Cyprus; Slovakia
6 points	Czech Republic; Macedonia; Russia; Ukraine
5 points	
4 points	Andorra; Bosnia and Herzegovina; Croatia; France; Israel; Poland
3 points	Belarus; Denmark; Lithuania; Netherlands; Slovenia
2 points	Latvia; Norway
1 point	Hungary; Moldova

==== Points awarded by the United Kingdom ====
Points awarded by the United Kingdom (Semi-final 1)
Score	Country
12 points	Turkey
10 points	Malta
8 points	Iceland
7 points	Sweden
6 points	Portugal
5 points	Armenia
4 points	Finland
3 points	Bosnia and Herzegovina
2 points	Romania
1 point	Israel

Points awarded by the United Kingdom (Final)
Score	Country
12 points	Turkey
10 points	Norway
8 points	Iceland
7 points	Germany
6 points	Malta
5 points	Greece
4 points	Lithuania
3 points	Azerbaijan
2 points	Ukraine
1 point	France

==== Detailed voting results ====
The following members comprised the British jury:

- Jasmine Dotiwala
- Paul Goodey
- Steve Allen
- Zoe Martlew
- Keith Hughes

Detailed voting results from the United Kingdom (Final)
R/O	Country	Results			Points
R/O	Country	Jury	Televoting	Combined	Points
01	Lithuania		8	8	4
02	Israel				
03	France	4		4	1
04	Sweden				
05	Croatia				
06	Portugal		1	1	
07	Iceland	10	5	15	8
08	Greece		10	10	5
09	Armenia	2		2	
10	Russia				
11	Azerbaijan	1	4	5	3
12	Bosnia and Herzegovina	3		3	
13	Moldova				
14	Malta	7	6	13	6
15	Estonia				
16	Denmark		3	3	
17	Germany	12	2	14	7
18	Turkey	6	12	18	12
19	Albania				
20	Norway	8	7	15	10
21	Ukraine	5		5	2
22	Romania				
23	United Kingdom				
24	Finland				
25	Spain				
