= It's My Time (Jade Ewen song) =

Song

Single by Jade Ewen
- Released: 23 March 2009
- Recorded: 2009
- Genre: Pop
- Length: 3:18
- Label: Polydor
- Songwriters: Andrew Lloyd Webber; Diane Warren
- Producer: Andrew Lloyd Webber

Jade Ewen singles chronology
"It's My Time" (2009)	"My Man" (2009)

Music video
- "It's My Time" on YouTube

Eurovision Song Contest 2009 entry
- Country: United Kingdom
- Artist: Jade Ewen
- Language: English
- Composer: Andrew Lloyd Webber
- Lyricists: Andrew Lloyd Webber; Diane Warren

Finals performance
- Final result: 5th
- Final points: 173

Entry chronology
- ◄ "Even If" (2008)
- "That Sounds Good to Me" (2010) ►

"It's My Time" is a song by Jade Ewen. It represented the United Kingdom in the Eurovision Song Contest 2009. The song was written by Andrew Lloyd Webber and Diane Warren and became the UK's most successful Eurovision entry since 2002 by coming fifth, and a significant improvement on the previous and following year's entries ("Even If" and "That Sounds Good to Me"), which both came last in the contest. She remained the one with the highest score for the UK since their victory in 1997, until 2022 when Sam Ryder finished in 2nd place with the song Space Man.

== Writing and inspiration ==
The song, intended specifically for the Eurovision Song Contest, was written in just two hours. Diane Warren talked about this in an interview for the BBC: "I don't usually co-write much, I tend to write by myself, so that was quite scary – especially with someone like Andrew Lloyd Webber who's a legend!"

== Eurovision Song Contest 2009 ==
=== Selection ===
Ewen won the right to sing the song as a result of her winning the United Kingdom's Eurovision selection process Eurovision: Your Country Needs You on 31 January 2009. Lloyd Webber also announced that he would accompany Ewen, by playing the piano on stage with her in Moscow. The official version of the song was first broadcast on Ken Bruce's BBC Radio 2 show on 23 March 2009.

=== Contest ===
As the United Kingdom is a part of the "Big Four", the song was entered directly into the final of the contest, held on 16 May 2009 in Moscow. The show received an average of 7.8 million viewers and peaked at 9.8 million during the voting, which is a 35.3% share of the British TV audience.

The United Kingdom did well during the contest and finished in 5th place, with 173 points in contrast to the previous few years in which none of the UK's entries from 2003 onwards had made it into the top 15. It was the UK's highest placing since Jessica Garlick in 2002 and the largest number of points received since 1997, when it won with "Love Shine a Light".

== Critical reception ==
Digital Spy gave the song a mixed review, saying:

Equally, if you're going to ask Andrew Lloyd Webber and Diane Warren to write a song for your X Factor-style talent contest, you're probably going to end up with something that sounds like an X Factor winner's song crossed with a show tune. "I've got the will, I've earned the right," croons Ewen before the bombast begins, "to show you it's my time tonight". Overblown, old-fashioned and shamelessly sentimental, this could be just what Eurovision ordered.

Fraser McAlpine from the BBC's Chartblog rated the song three stars out of five, stating that the song was "the sort of thing we've all heard hundreds of times" yet praised Ewen's vocal abilities: "Still, Jade Ewen has a formidable set of pipes and copes admirably with the mad range the song requires, so you never know."

However, the song was also praised for bringing a comeback for the United Kingdom in the Eurovision Song Contest. Alastair Jamieson of the Daily Telegraph reported that Lloyd Webber said that Britain can "hold its head high" after the performance that Jade Ewen gave in Eurovision.

== Music video ==
A screen capture from the video showing Ewen and Webber

The official music video was launched on the BBC website on 31 March 2009. It also stars Andrew Lloyd Webber in the background on the piano. It shows Ewen in a white feathered dress walking out of a limo with paparazzi talking pictures of her. This is accompanied with Jade standing under a spotlight with a microphone, whilst Lloyd Webber plays the piano. The video was directed by Pop Club.

== Promotion ==
Ewen promoted the single all over Europe. This was the first time that a UK Eurovision entry has promoted a single across Europe before the event. Ewen also appeared, alongside Webber, on Friday Night with Jonathan Ross and also made appearances and performed the single on Loose Women, Saturday Kitchen, BBC Breakfast, National Lottery and The One Show. Webber accompanied Ewen on the piano for her performance at the Eurovision final on 16 May. "It's My Time" was promoted heavily in Russia with a free copy of the single being given away with the Russian version of OK! magazine. She also performed on many countries' national selections including Bosnia & Herzegovina's, Russia's and Spain's and her home country—The United Kingdom.

== Track listing ==
UK CD single

1. It's My Time (Original) – 03:18
2. It's My Time (Instrumental) – 03:18

Jewel Case Promo

1. It's My Time (Original) – 03:18

Remix Promo

1. It's My Time (Digital Dog Radio Edit) – 02:38
2. It's My Time (Original) – 03:18
3. It's My Time (Digital Dog Dub) – 05:36
4. It's My Time (Digital Dog Club Mix) – 05:39

== Charts ==
"It's My Time" was released in the UK as a download on 4 May 2009. On 18 May the single had its UK physical release. The song debuted on the UK singles chart at No. 103, climbed to No. 50 the following week, and reached a peak of No. 27 on its third week after physical release.

Chart (2009)	Peak Position
Germany (GfK)	75
Sweden (Sverigetopplistan)	34
Switzerland (Schweizer Hitparade)	75
UK Singles (OCC)	27

== Release history ==
Region	Date	Label	Format
United Kingdom	23 March 2009	Polydor	Radio single
United Kingdom	4 May 2009	Polydor	Digital single
United Kingdom	18 May 2009	Polydor	CD single

== Covers ==
Taiwanese countertenor singer Lin Yu Chun included his version in the debut album It's My Time in September 2010.
