= Love (Is All We Need) =

Single by Adam J featuring Amelle Berrabah and The Nightcrashers
- Released: 19 August 2013
- Recorded: 2013
- Genre: Electro-dance
- Length: 3:32
- Label: Nightcrasher Records
- Songwriters: Amelle Berrabah, Pete Kirtley, Adam J
- Producers: The Game, Pete Kirtley

Adam J singles chronology
"We Came to Party" (2013)	"Love (Is All We Need)" (2013)

Amelle Berrabah singles chronology
"Never Leave You" (2009)	"Love Is All We Need" (2013)	"Summertime" (2014)

The Nightcrashers singles chronology
"Love (Is All We Need)" (2013)

"Love (Is All We Need)" is a song recorded by British DJ Adam J, and features Sugababes' Amelle Berrabah and production team The Nightcrashers. It was released on 19 August 2013, and is Berrabah's second solo release as a featured artist since her collaboration with Tinchy Stryder on his single "Never Leave You" in 2009. The song is credited to Adam J as lead artist and features Amelle's vocals. The song failed to chart.

== Background ==
In May 2013, Amelle Berrabah confirmed she had nearly completed work on her solo album, and was looking to release the collection some time in the summer. Berrabah later revealed further details about her solo album, and hinted at the release of a new single: "I'll be starting a promo at the end of June with my single and the rest will fit into place. I'm really excited and can't wait." In June 2013 it was announced that Amelle Berrabah had teamed up with British DJ Adam J for his new single, which was stated to feature production team The Nightcrashers. The single was released on 19 August 2013.

== Music video ==
A lyric video for the song was released onto YouTube on 24 June 2013, which also confirmed Berrabah's collaboration with Adam J. On 19 July 2013, Nightcrasher Records previewed a 'Behind the Scenes' video of the shoot for the single. The official music video for the single premiered on 26 July. The video shows Amelle singing in a nightclub, while other scenes show a couple's romantic relationship story, with Adam J acting as a narrator.

== Track listing ==
- Digital remix EP
1. "Love (Is All We Need)" featuring Nightcrashers & Amelle – 3:32
2. "Love (Is All We Need)" featuring Nightcrashers & Amelle (Extended) – 6:00
3. "Love (Is All We Need)" featuring Nightcrashers & Amelle (Extended Instrumental) – 6:00
4. "Love (Is All We Need)" featuring Nightcrashers & Amelle (Radio Edit) – 3:17

== Release history ==
Region	Date	Format	Label
Ireland	19 August 2013	Digital download	Nightcrasher Records
United Kingdom	19 August 2013	Digital download	Nightcrasher Records
