= Sweet 7 =

2010 studio album by Sugababes

Studio album by Sugababes
- Released: 5 March 2010
- Recorded: April–November 2009
- Studios: London, UK; Los Angeles, US; New York City, US; Copenhagen, Denmark
- Genres: Electropop; electro-R&B
- Length: 43:48
- Labels: Island; Roc Nation
- Producers: Fernando Garibay; Jonas Jeberg; Martin K; RedOne; The Smeezingtons; Stargate; Syience

Sugababes chronology
Catfights and Spotlights (2008)	Sweet 7 (2010)	The Lost Tapes (2022)

Singles from Sweet 7
- 1. "Get Sexy" Released: 30 August 2009; 2. "About a Girl" Released: 8 November 2009; 3. "Wear My Kiss" Released: 21 February 2010

Sweet 7 is the seventh studio album by British girl group Sugababes, released on 5 March 2010 by Roc Nation and Island Records. Production for the album began in April 2009. Sweet 7 is the only Sugababes album to feature Eurovision Song Contest 2009 entrant Jade Ewen, who joined the group following the dismissal of founding member Keisha Buchanan in September 2009. As a result of the group line-up change, Sweet 7 was re-recorded to feature the vocals of new member Ewen and for the removal of Buchanan's vocals, making this the only Sugababes album that features none of the original members.

Production on the album began with Buchanan's involvement, who was featured on the lead single "Get Sexy", which peaked at number two in the UK. Following her departure, "About a Girl" and "Wear My Kiss" peaked at number eight and seven, respectively. The album was written and produced mostly musicians attached to Jay-Z's entertainment company Roc Nation; the involvement of Roc Nation's in-house producers gave the album a strong electro and dance-pop sound, derived from music and producers popular at the time, including: Fernando Garibay, Stargate and The Smeezingtons. Despite the high-profile input, Sweet 7 was negatively received by critics, who criticised the lack of an identifiable sound and soul from the project, as well as the group's loss of identity due to Buchanan's departure; many considered it a major step down in quality from their previous work.

Sweet 7 peaked at number 14 in the UK and number 35 in Ireland, becoming the group's second-lowest charting album to date in those countries. Promotion for the album ended after the release of the third single "Wear My Kiss". It was widely reported that the album underperformed; Sugababes would go on to be dropped by Roc Nation and end up leaving Island Records for a new three-album deal with Sony Music via a joint venture between RCA Records and Crown MD. Although this line up would go on to release another song "Freedom", retrospective coverage about this period in the band's history noted that the underperformance of Sweet 7 ultimately led to the permanent hiatus of Berrabah, Ewen and Range's version of the group. This hiatus would trigger the original line-up (Buchanan, Mutya Buena and Siobhán Donaghy) reforming in 2012 and then later reclaiming the Sugababes name for themselves in 2019.

== Background and production ==
Prior to the album's creation, Sugababes signed a US record deal with Jay-Z's label Roc Nation. The album was recorded by Sugababes mostly in Los Angeles and New York with a couple of sessions in London. The group primarily worked with RedOne, Ryan Tedder, Stargate, Fernando Garibay, and The Smeezingtons. One of the album's tracks, "No More You", was written by Ne-Yo. Keisha Buchanan compared the song to Rihanna's "Hate That I Love You" and "Take a Bow". Buchanan told BBC Radio 1's Newsbeat, the album has "definitely got the British feel throughout the album - we've not gone away and gone 'All American' on our fans." Buchanan continued, "I think it's given us a fresh energy again. I think the one thing we wanted to do was come back with something different." She also admitted the girls had become "complacent" around the time of Catfights and Spotlights (2008) but they also said that they are very proud of that album.

After the release of the album's first single "Get Sexy" and just two months before its initial projected November 2009 release, it was reported by the media that Amelle Berrabah had quit the group. Buchanan, however, denied any drama within the group and insisted that Berrabah would remain a member "for the moment". Rumors began circulating that Jade Ewen, the UK's 2009 Eurovision Song Contest entrant, would be joining the group and replacing Berrabah. On 21 September 2009, it was announced that Buchanan had left the band, although she stated via her Twitter account that it was not her decision to leave. Berrabah and fellow member Heidi Range later stated that they both attempted to quit the Sugababes, but were persuaded to stay by their managers, leading to Buchanan's exit. Buchanan herself said "Although it was not my choice to leave, it's time to enter a new chapter in my life. I would like to state that there were no arguments, bullying or anything of the sort that lead [sic] to this. Sometimes a breakdown in communication and lack of trust can result in many different things"

At the same time as these announcements, it was confirmed that Ewen was replacing Buchanan. The following day, she was flown to America to film the music video for the second single from Sweet 7, "About a Girl". In October, Berrabah took temporary leave from the band citing "nervous exhaustion", partially due to Buchanan's departure. Berrabah's break included checking into a rest and rehab facility which led to the cancellation of some performances. Meanwhile, Ewen began recording her vocals over Buchanan's in preparation for the album's release. "About a Girl" and its music video were released in November, and additional new material was recorded the same month.

== Songs ==
"Thank You for the Heartbreak" is an electropop song with a 1980s electro influence. David Balls of Digital Spy described it as a "snappy electropop number", and noted its potential to "have slotted quite nicely" onto Sugababes' fifth studio album, Change (2007). During an interview with Digital Spy, group member Amelle Berrabah stated that "Thank You for the Heartbreak" is amongst the tracks on the album that the Sugababes enjoy, and later named it a potential single from the album. There was a "potential lyrical mishap" with the song's lyric, 'dancing off my tears', on which Heidi Range replied: "If people want to sing that when we perform it, well, we won't complain!" Nick Levine of Digital Spy wrote that the song "displays the Sugababes spunk of old" in comparison to the other "characterless" tracks on the album. David Balls of Digital Spy noted that the song suggests that the Sugababes "extracted maximum benefit from their recording sessions in LA earlier this year", and they did not "stray too far from their comfort zone". Balls also described "Thank You for the Heartbreak", as well as the album's second single "About a Girl", as a track that is both "fresh-sounding" and "packed with the attitude that always made the group stand out." Thomas H Green of The Daily Telegraph listed the song in his "Download this" category. Lauren Murphy of Entertainment Ireland described it as a "minor saving grace" and "very likeable" in comparison to the other "mediocre" tracks on the album.

"She's a Mess" is an uptempo electropop song. Originally called "I'm a Mess", the group decided to retitle it due to concerns that the lyrics (such as "Drinking bottle after bottle / I'm such a mess in that dress / I'm not impressed") encouraged binge drinking. However, Range stated that "there are some lyrics that are quite cheeky but people shouldn't take them seriously." During an interview for Digital Spy, Berrabah described the overall sound of Sweet 7, saying: "It's quite an uptempo album with a lot of different sounds." Berrabah cited "She's a Mess" as an example for this, which she said was "just totally different from everything else." Jon O'Brien of AllMusic wrote that the "aptly named 'She's a Mess' is a chaotic attempt at a Clubland trance-pop floor-filler". Al Fox of the British Broadcasting Corporation called the song, along with the album's third single "Wear My Kiss", a "glimmer of brilliance" and went on to say that it is saved by Berrabah's "unashamed attitude". Christopher Lee of The Scotsman named it one of the better tracks on the album, although admitted that it "wouldn't have sounded much different coming from any other girl band". Nick Levine of Digital Spy wrote that "sisterhood" is being "jettisoned entirely" on the track, which he described as "crass and misogynistic". Celina Murphy of Hot Press suggested that "She's a Mess" "might actually sound quite punchy" if it was recorded by Barbadian recording artist Rihanna.

== Critical reception ==
Professional ratings
Aggregate scores
Source	Rating
Metacritic	39/100
Review scores
Source	Rating
AllMusic	2/5 stars
Daily Mirror	2/5 stars
The Daily Telegraph	3/5 stars
The Guardian	2/5 stars
The Independent	1/5 stars
London Evening Standard	2/5 stars
NME	2/5 stars
The Scotsman	1/5 stars
The Times	1/5 stars
Virgin Media	2/5 stars

Sweet 7 received poor reviews from music critics. Aggregating website Metacritic, which assigns a normalised rating out of 100 given to reviews from mainstream critics, gave the album an average score of 39, based on six reviews, which indicates "generally unfavorable reviews".

Jon O'Brien of AllMusic, who gave the album a 2 out of 5 star rating, criticised it as a "bland, soulless, and repetitive affair", while admitting that it "reveals they [Sugababes] are now unrecognizable, not only in terms of personnel, but also in terms of their sound and image". He admitted that although the album is "never short of an infectious hook or club-friendly production", it "undoubtedly betrays the experimental sensibilities that set them apart from their contemporaries." Thomas H Green of The Daily Telegraph gave the album a 3 out of 5 star rating, praising it as "catchy, cod-sexy, hi-NRG cheese that will ensure jammed and joyful school discos and gay club dance floors."

Caroline Sullivan of The Guardian called the album "disappointing" and criticised the band's shift in sound, stating that most of the tracks "are [...] either in thrall to Lady Gaga's robotronic sound" or "just wrong for this particular band", with her gaving the album 2 out of 5 stars. Andy Gill of The Independent gave a notably unfavorable review wherein the album was awarded 1 out of 5 stars. He criticised the group's lack of identity, in particular the loss of founding member Buchanan, writing: "Sugababes finally slipped from being a band to a brand". He went on to say that the "policy of replenishment has eroded both the trio's character and its appeal". Regarding the quality of the album, Gill felt that Sweet 7 contained mostly "generic disco stompers".

Rick Pearson of London Evening Standard wrote that Range, Berrabah and Ewen were unconvincingly "grasping for an identity" on the album, giving it 2 out of 5 stars. Alex Denney of NME awarded it 4 out of 10, writing that Sweet 7 "leaves us hankering after the good old days" and that "time was we could expect more than bland consistency from the Sugababes – shame." Johnny Dee of Virgin Media awarded Sweet 7 2 out of 5 stars; according to him, the Sugababes "have completely lost all vocal character and personality". The Times's Dan Cairns criticised the album's songs and went on to write that the Sugababes in 2010 "are a pale, karaoke imitation of the glory days." Simon Price of The Independent wrote that the group "plays it depressingly safe with substandard electro pop", while reacting negatively to the line-up change, saying: "They [Sugababes] can call themselves what they like, but they'll never fill the heels of Keisha, Mutya and Siobhan. It's over."

== Commercial performance ==
Sweet 7 debuted at number 14 on the UK Albums Chart. It became the Sugababes' lowest-charting album in the country since their 2000 debut album, One Touch. The album dropped 29 places to number 43 in the following week, which was its last appearance in the chart. In Ireland, Sweet 7 peaked at number 35 on the Irish Albums Chart, becoming their second-lowest charting album in that country to date. The album debuted at number 92 on the Swiss Albums Chart, becoming their lowest charting album in that country, excluding Catfights and Spotlights (2008), which failed to chart. Sweet 7 debuted at number five on the Greek International Albums Chart, staying the chart for two weeks.

== Legacy and career impact ==
Almost a year to the date of the release of Sweet 7, Digital Spy reported that the Sugababes had been dropped from their US record deal with Roc Nation due to poor album sales. This was retrospectively confirmed by the Radio Times in 2025. In June 2011, it was reported by Digital Spy that the group would be leaving Island Records, an imprint of Universal Music, for a three album deal with a Sony Music record label, and this would follow the release of a new single called "Freedom" that would feature in marketing for an upcoming Nokia mobiles campaign. This was confirmed by BBC News the following month, who announced that the group were signing under a joint venture with RCA Records and Crown MD. The deal was supposed to see "Freedom" released on September 5, 2011, with an accompanying album following later that year. However, aside from "Freedom", no other new music would be released by this line up of the group.

Also in 2023, after original members Buchanan, Mutya Buena and Siobhán Donaghy reunited under the Sugababes name, Buchanan said that she had no interest in performing songs from Sweet 7, but refused to cast blame towards Berrabah, Range, the songwriters or the producers. Buchanan stated that the album and process of making it left her feeling scared and she was unhappy that there were demos that existed with her vocals on the album.

== Singles ==
"Get Sexy" was released on 30 August 2009 as the album's lead single. It is the last single to feature vocals by founding member Buchanan. Some reviewers praised the song's production and lyrics, while others dismissed it as unoriginal and generic. The song peaked at number two on the UK Singles Chart and number three on the Irish Singles Chart, while also charting on the singles charts in Australia, Austria, Belgium, the Czech Republic, Germany, Sweden and Slovakia.

"About a Girl", the first single to feature vocals by Ewen, was released as the album's second single on 8 November 2009. The single peaked at number eight on the UK Singles Chart and inside the top twenty on the Irish Singles Chart.

"Wear My Kiss" was released as the third and final single from Sweet 7 on 21 February 2010, three weeks prior to the album's release. It went top-ten in the UK and Ireland at numbers seven and nine, respectively.

== Track listing ==
Sweet 7 track listing
No.	Title	Writer(s)	Producer(s)	Length
1.	"Get Sexy"	Bruno Mars; Philip Lawrence; Ari Levine; Richard Fairbrass; Fred Fairbrass; Rob Manzoli	The Smeezingtons	3:14
2.	"Wear My Kiss"	Fernando Garibay; Mars; Lawrence; Carlos Battey; Steven Battey	Garibay	3:44
3.	"About a Girl"	Makeba Riddick; Nadir Khayat	RedOne	3:28
4.	"Wait for You"	Garibay; Mars; Lawrence	Garibay	3:54
5.	"Thank You for the Heartbreak"	Ryan Tedder; Mikkel Eriksen; Tor Erik Hermansen; Claude Kelly	Stargate	3:40
6.	"Miss Everything" (featuring Sean Kingston)	Mars; Lawrence; Levine; Brody Brown	The Smeezingtons	3:39
7.	"She's a Mess"	Mars; Lawrence; Levine	The Smeezingtons	3:26
8.	"Give It to Me Now"	Crystal Johnson; Reggie Perry	Syience	2:50
9.	"Crash & Burn"	Jonas Jeberg; Marcus Bryant; Nakisha Smith	Jeberg	3:35
10.	"No More You"	Shaffer Smith; Eriksen; Hermansen	Stargate; Ne-Yo^{[a]}	4:15
11.	"Sweet & Amazing (Make It the Best)"	Rob Allen; Eriksen; Hermansen; Martin Kleveland; Bernt Stray	Stargate; Martin K	3:50
12.	"Little Miss Perfect"	Hermansen; Eriksen; Kelly	Stargate	3:53
Total length:				43:48

Sweet 7 – iTunes Store bonus content
No.	Title	Writer(s)	Producer(s)	Length
13.	"About a Girl" (The Sharp Boys Extended Remix)	Riddick; Khayat	RedOne; The Sharp Boys^{[b]}	7:22
14.	"About a Girl" (music video)			4:23
15.	"Wear My Kiss" (music video)			3:13

Notes

- ^a signifies a co-producer
- ^b signifies an additional producer

Sample credits

- "Get Sexy" contains an interpolation of the 1991 song "I'm Too Sexy" by the band Right Said Fred.

== Personnel ==
Track listing and credits taken from Sweet 7 liner notes.

Visuals

- StudioBOWDEN – art direction

Vocal and performance credits

- Carlos Battey & Steven Battey – background vocals
- Amelle Berrabah – lead vocals, background vocals
- Jade Ewen – lead vocals, background vocals
- Sean Kingston – guest vocals
- Philip Lawrence – background vocals
- Ari Levin – background vocals
- Bruno Mars – background vocals
- Heidi Range – lead vocals, background vocals

Technical

- Marcus John Bryant – vocal producer, recording
- Daniel Davidsen – guitar
- Kevin "KD" Davis – mixer
- Richard Edgeler – assistant (for additional production/mixing)
- Matt Foster – recording
- Fernando Garibay – producer, programming, arrangement
- Josh Houghkirk – assistant
- Jonas Jeberg – producer, vocal producer, instrumentation, recording
- Crystal "Cristyle" Johnson – vocal producer
- Martin "Martin K" Kleveland – producer, instrumentation
- Philip Lawrence – vocal producer (additional - "About a Girl")
- Ari Levine – mixer, instrumentation, recording
- Damien Lewis – engineer
- Bruno Mars – musician
- Mads Nilsson – mixer
- AJ Nunez – assistant mixer
- Robert Orton – mixer
- Carlos Oyanedel – engineer
- Derek Pacuk – recording
- Dave Pensado – mixer
- Reggie "Syience" Perry – producer
- Nadir "RedOne" Khayat – engineer, instrumentation, programming, vocal editor
- Makeba Riddick – vocal producer
- Johnny Severin – engineer, vocal editor
- Shaffer "Ne-Yo" Smith – co-producer
- Tor Hermansen, Mikkel S. Erikson (Stargate) – producers, instrumentation
- Mike Stevens – vocal producer (additional)
- Bernt Rune Stray – writer, guitar
- Phil Tan – mixer
- Jeremy Wheatley – vocal mixer (additional)

== Charts ==
Chart performance for Sweet 7
Chart (2010)	Peak position
Greek Albums (IFPI)	5
Irish Albums (IRMA)	35
Scottish Albums (OCC)	16
Swiss Albums (Schweizer Hitparade)	92
UK Albums (OCC)	14

== Release history ==
Sweet 7 release history
Region	Date	Label	Catalogue	Ref(s)
Poland	5 March 2010	Universal Music	060252727295	
Switzerland	5 March 2010	Universal Music	060252727295	
Austria	5 March 2010	Universal Music	060252727295	
Australia	12 March 2010	Universal Music	060252727295	
Netherlands	12 March 2010	Universal Music	060252727295	
Ireland	12 March 2010	Island		
United Kingdom	15 March 2010	Island	00602527272955	
Germany	16 March 2010	Universal Music	0602527272955	
