= About a Girl (Sugababes song) =

2009 single by Sugababes

Single by Sugababes

from the album Sweet 7
- Released: 8 November 2009
- Recorded: 2009
- Genre: Europop; future house
- Length: 3:28
- Label: Island; Roc Nation
- Songwriters: Nadir Khayat; Makeba Riddick
- Producer: RedOne

Sugababes singles chronology
"Get Sexy" (2009)	"About a Girl" (2009)	"Wear My Kiss" (2010)

Music video
- "About a Girl" on YouTube

"About a Girl" is a song by British girl group Sugababes from their seventh studio album, Sweet 7 (2010). RedOne produced the song and wrote it in collaboration with Makeba Riddick. It is an uptempo europop and future house song with a dance-inspired middle eight. The song was released on 8 November 2009 in the United Kingdom and Ireland, as the album's second single. "About a Girl" is the first single to feature vocals by band member Jade Ewen, following the departure of Keisha Buchanan, the last remaining original member, in September 2009.

Critical response to the song was mixed. Some critics praised it as a standout track from Sweet 7, although other criticised it as unoriginal and generic. The song peaked at number eight on the UK Singles Chart, number four on the Scottish Singles Chart, and inside the top twenty on the Irish Singles Chart. It additionally charted in Poland and Slovakia. The music video for the song was filmed in September 2009 amid the group's controversial line-up change. It was directed by Martin Weisz and filmed at Vasquez Rocks, near Los Angeles. The video has a Kill Bill theme, and features stunt doubles fighting businessmen in a caravan. The Sugababes performed the song on GMTV, at Children in Need, and at the UK Asian Music Awards.

== Development and composition ==
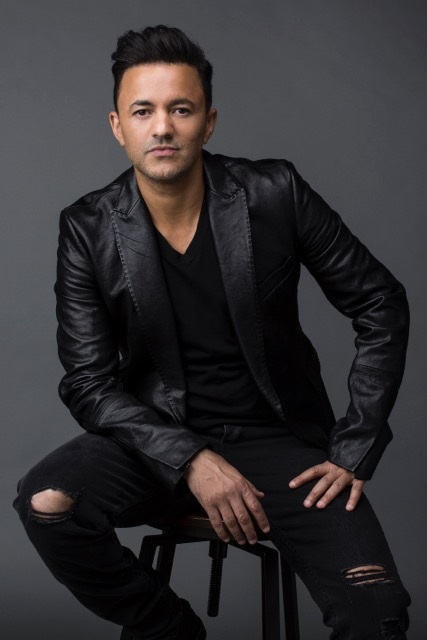
Sugababes signed a contract with Jay-Z's label Roc Nation, resulting in the collaboration with RedOne (pictured).

The Sugababes travelled to the United States in April 2009, to commence work on their seventh studio album, Sweet 7. They signed a contract with Jay-Z's label, Roc Nation, resulting in collaborations with high-profile producers. In late April 2009, the Sugababes revealed that they were working with Nadir Khayat, known by his stage name RedOne, on two songs. "About a Girl" was written and produced by RedOne, who wrote the song in collaboration with Makeba Riddick. The song was recorded at Henson Studios in Los Angeles, California. It was mixed by Robert Orton.

"About a Girl" is an uptempo Europop and future house song. NME's Alex Denney described it as a "slice of future-house". The song contains club synthesizers and a middle eight with a "90s dance-inspired" feel. Nick Levine of Digital Spy noted that it is a departure from the group's previous sounds. The lyrical content makes references to Louboutins and apple pie, the latter of which is sung by group member Amelle Berrabah during the bridge in a "gravelly" style. According to Fraser McAlphine from BBC, "About a Girl" rivals "Get Sexy" in terms of the overall noise levels.

== Release ==
In August 2009, "About a Girl" was confirmed for release as the second single from Sweet 7. The first version of the song, featuring Buchanan's vocals, premiered on BBC Radio 1 on 6 September 2009. During the single release interval between "Get Sexy" and "About a Girl", Buchanan was kicked out of the Sugababes. As a result of the group line-up change, "About a Girl" was immediately re-recorded to feature the vocals of new member Jade Ewen in replacement of former member Buchanan's. The new version of the song was released as a digital download on 8 November 2009 and a CD single the following day.

== Critical reception ==
"About a Girl" received mixed reviews from critics. Levine from Digital Spy described the song as a "europoppy club pumper with an ear-snagging chorus". He suggested it was the group's most infectious single since "About You Now", but called it characterless along with the album's other tracks. Fraser McAlpine of BBC regarded the song as a "dancefloor-friendly tune with an insistent chorus that echoes around your head", and compared it to the group's music from previous years. Jon O'Brien of Allmusic described "About a Girl" as a "gloriously sassy uptempo Lady Gaga-esque number that stands up next to the best of their back catalog", and named it the "one saving grace" from the album. Caroline Sullivan of The Guardian admitted that although Sweet 7 was significantly Americanised, the track "escaped with some quirky Britishness intact". The Independent critic Andy Gill criticised the song as a "generic disco stomper" and regarded it as "vacuous".

== Chart performance ==
"About a Girl" debuted on the 21 November 2009 issue of the UK Singles Chart at number eight, becoming the fourth-highest debut during that week. It lasted eight weeks on the chart. The song has sold 125,000 copies in the UK, ranking as the group's thirteenth best-selling UK single. Group member Berrabah commented upon their satisfaction with the song's performance in the UK, saying: "We didn’t do any promotion for the new single and it still came in at number eight. We are over the moon with that and our record label is as well." The single debuted and peaked at number four on the Scottish Singles Chart, and was the second-highest debut for that week. It reached number 14 on the Irish Singles Chart. The single peaked at number 22 on the Polish Dance Top 50 chart. "About a Girl" charted at number 69 on the Slovak Singles Chart. The single's performance throughout Europe allowed it to chart on the European Hot 100 Singles chart, where it reached number 28.

== Music video ==
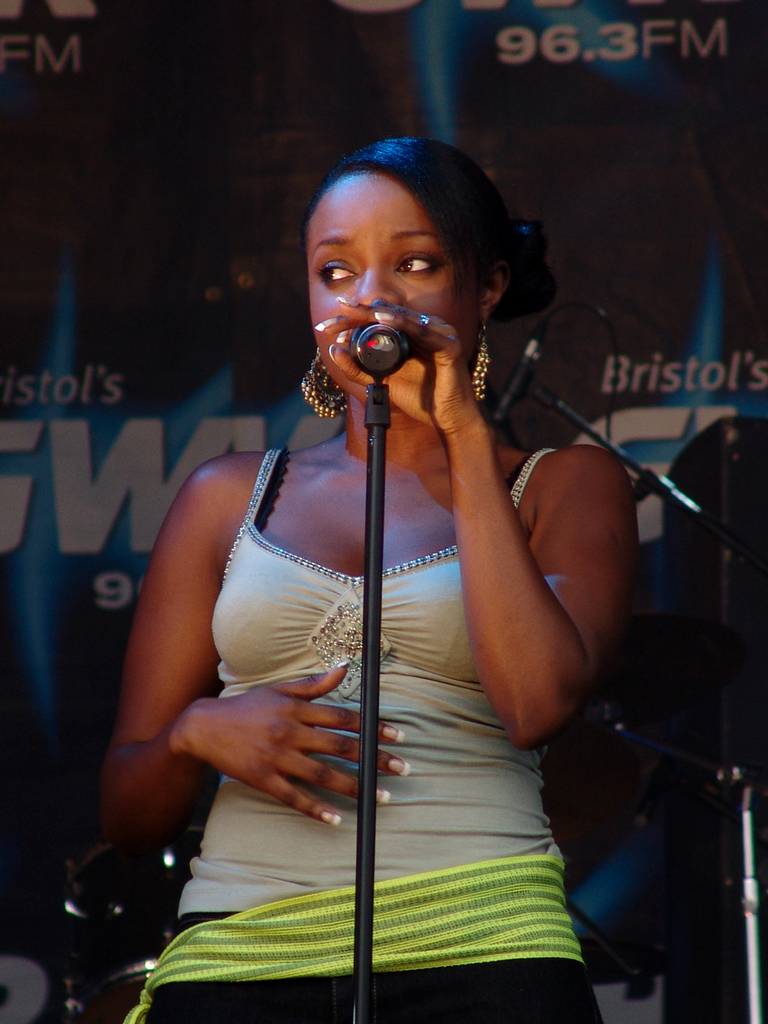
The music video for "About a Girl" is the first to not feature Keisha Buchanan (pictured), one of the original members of the group.

The music video for "About a Girl" was directed by Martin Weisz. Inspired by a Kill Bill theme, the video was filmed at Vasquez Rocks, near Los Angeles, California on 22 September 2009, one day following the announcement that Buchanan was replaced by Ewen. Ewen had not met the remaining members of the Sugababes until two days before the video shoot for "About a Girl". Stunt doubles were used to portray the Sugababes members as they were unsure if the band would be together by the time of the song's release.

The video begins with two businessmen in a caravan discussing a job. After the conversation has ended, a vehicle driven by the stunt doubles arrives in the desert. They leave the vehicle while group member Heidi Range sings her verse as she dances around it. All three members of the group begin dancing during the chorus while a stunt double enters the caravan with a red briefcase. Following this, Berrabah sings her verse of the song while her stunt double is talking to the businessman. Sugababes begin dancing again while the stunt double attacks the businessman, who is drop-kicked out of the caravan. Another businessman begins attacking her, although he too loses the fight. Ewen's stunt double begins fighting with another man outside of the caravan, and he also is defeated. Later in the video, the businessmen are seen tied together on the ground and the stunt double throws the briefcase, which turns out to be a jack in the box. At the end of the video, the stunt doubles re-enter the vehicle and drive out of the desert.

David Balls of Digital Spy commended the video, describing it as an "action-packed affair that's nearly as dramatic as the group's own history" and praising its "plenty of slick dance moves and provocative pouting thrown in for good measure".

In a 2022 interview, Buchanan confirmed that she was en route to the music video set when she received the news that she had been replaced.

== Live performances ==
The Sugababes premiered "About A Girl" at the Midlands Music Festival on 8 August 2009. The song was performed by Keisha Buchanan and Heidi Range in performance for MSN on 8 September 2009. Following Buchanan's departure from the group, promotion for "About a Girl" was halted when Amelle Berrabah was admitted to a private health clinic in Europe citing "nervous exhaustion"; this led to the cancellation of a scheduled appearance on German TV. The Sugababes were scheduled to headline the Scottish Royal Variety Performance, although this was cancelled due to "a number of legal issues to be finalised". Following Berrabah's return from the clinic, "About a Girl" was performed live for the first time by the new line-up on GMTV. An acoustic version of the song was performed live on 11 November 2009 on Radio 1 from Maida Vale Studios. Sugababes also performed the song on 21 November 2009 for Children in Need, an annual British charity appeal organised by the BBC. In March 2010, the band performed a "Desi" remix of the song at the UK Asian Music Awards.

== Track listing ==
- Digital EP
1. "About a Girl" – 3:28
2. "About a Girl" (Martin Roth NuStyle Remix) – 6:26
3. "About a Girl" (Martin Roth NuStyle Radio Edit) – 4:08
4. "About a Girl" (K-Gee Remix) – 4:51
5. "About a Girl" (K-Gee Radio Edit) – 3:30
- Digital Single
1. "About a Girl" – 3:28
2. "About a Girl" (The Sharp Boys Radio Edit) – 3:47

- CD single
1. "About a Girl" – 3:28
2. "About a Girl" (Martin Roth NuStyle Radio Edit) – 4:08
3. "About a Girl" (The Sharp Boys Radio Edit) – 3:47
4. "About a Girl" (K-Gee Radio Edit) – 3:30

== Credits and personnel ==
- Songwriting – Nadir Khayat, Makeba Riddick
- Production - RedOne
- Engineering - RedOne, Johnny Severin
- Instruments - RedOne

- Vocal editors - RedOne, Johnny Severin
- Vocal production - Makeba Riddick
- Mixing - Robert Orton
- Additional vocal production - Philip Lawrence

Credits adapted from the liner notes of Sweet 7.

== Charts ==
Chart (2009)	Peak position
European Hot 100 (Billboard)	28
Ireland (IRMA)	14
Poland Dance (ZPAV)	22
Scottish Singles Sales (Official Charts)	4
Slovakia Airplay (ČNS IFPI)	69
UK Singles (Official Charts)	8
UK Airplay (Music Week)	15

== Certifications ==
Region	Certification	Certified units/sales
United Kingdom (BPI)	Silver	200,000^{‡}
^{‡} Sales+streaming figures based on certification alone.

== Release history ==
Region	Date	Format	Label
Ireland	8 November 2009	Digital download	Island Records
United Kingdom	8 November 2009	Digital download	Island Records
