= Freedom (Sugababes song) =

Promotional single by Sugababes
- Released: 25 September 2011
- Recorded: February 2011
- Genre: Electropop; dubstep
- Length: 3:24
- Label: RCA
- Songwriters: Jason Pebworth; Jon Shave; George Astasio; Kyle Abrahams; Peter Ighile; Mariah Young-Jones; Rowan Martin
- Producers: The Invisible Men; Parker & James

Music video
- "Sugababes - Freedom" on YouTube

"Freedom" is a promotional song by English girl group Sugababes. It was written by Jason Pebworth, Jon Shave, George Astasio, Kyle Abrahams, Peter Ighile, Mariah Young-Jones and Rowan Martin, and produced by The Invisible Men in collaboration with Parker & James. The song premiered in May 2011 during a music festival in Morocco, and was promoted with various snippets and teasers in addition to an advertisement for the Nokia N8. It is an electropop song with elements of dubstep. It is the final song this lineup released before they disbanded and the original lineup reformed.

"Freedom" was due for release as the lead single from their anticipated eighth studio album, although the song was cancelled as an official single and instead made a free digital download via Amazon. Despite the controversy surrounding its release, the song received positive reviews from critics, who complimented its sound and the use of dubstep. The music video, which was directed by Sean De Sparigo and filmed in July 2011, features the Sugababes in an underground club. The trio performed "Freedom" at the T4 on the Beach festival on 10 July 2011.

== Background ==
Following the release of their seventh studio album Sweet 7, which was met with poor reviews and low sales, it was confirmed that the Sugababes had begun work on their eighth studio album. In February 2011, group member Heidi Range stated that the Sugababes were aiming to finish the album in time for a summer 2011 release. She revealed that the group completed a song which they believed could be the album's lead single. The Sugababes confirmed in May 2011 that they would premiere "Freedom" at the Mawazine Festival in Morocco. In July 2011, the group's management confirmed that the group had left their longtime record company Island Records and signed a three-album deal with Sony's RCA label. The artwork for "Freedom" was revealed in August 2011; it features the Sugababes on a sofa wearing deep green clothing.

== Composition and lyrics ==
"Freedom" was written by Jason Pebworth, Jon Shave, George Astasio, Kyle Abrahams, Peter Ighile, Mariah Young-Jones and Rowan Martin. Pebworth, Shave and Astasio produced the song under their stage name The Invisible Men, in collaboration with Parker & James, consisting of Abrahams and Ighile. "Freedom" is an electropop song with elements of dubstep. It is backed by synthesizers with a "moody" arrangement. According to the British website Orange, "Freedom" is a "controlled, steady anthem" with a "darker, deeper and more soulful" sound. During the pre-chorus, the group chants the lines "So raise your hands / One fist in the air / For free-ee-ee-ee dom-dom-dom" over a prominent dubstep beat. Sugababes member Amelle Berrabah interpreted the track as about "being free, liberated and being powerful".

== Release and reception ==
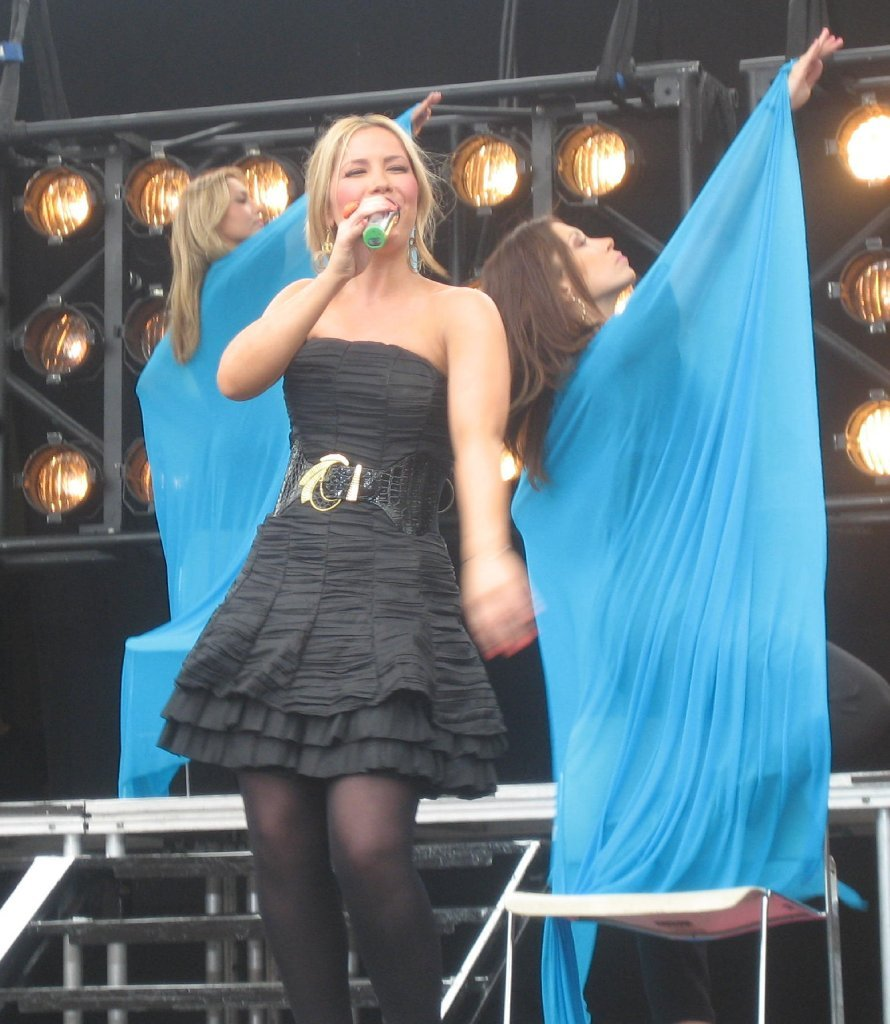
Heidi Range stated in February 2011 that the Sugababes completed a potential lead single for the album.

A snippet of "Freedom" appeared online on 1 June 2011 as part of an advertising campaign for the Nokia N8. In July 2011, the Sugababes released a teaser of the song online, while the full version premiered online in August 2011. "Freedom" was due to be officially released on 5 September 2011, although the date was pushed back to 25 September. The song was made available to pre-order on the iTunes Store, however, four days before its release date, the pre-order link was removed and "Freedom" was cancelled as an official single. Instead, the song was released as a free digital download via Amazon. The decision was clarified in a statement posted on the Sugababes' official Facebook page: "As a thank you to their fans, the Sugababes are offering their new single, 'Freedom' as a free download via Amazon."

Several media outlets reported that the single's release was cancelled due to major radio stations' reluctance to play the song, as well as the presumption that it would underperform in the charts. Despite the controversy surrounding its release, "Freedom" received positive reviews from critics. Robert Copsey of Digital Spy gave it a four out of five star rating, and wrote: "Truth be told, by the time the head-spinning dubstep moment kicks in, we're too busy throwing our finest shapes to care who's in the band anyway." A journalist from Orange regarded "Freedom" as an "unusual club track", and praised it as a "fine addition" to the Sugababes' collection of songs.

== Promotion ==
The music video for "Freedom" was directed by Sean De Sparengo, and filmed in London in July 2011. It took one day to film, and is primarily set in an underground club with red lighting, reminiscent of that featured in the group's 2002 single "Freak like Me". De Sparengo commented on the concept and visual attributes of the video, saying: "One of the interesting things for the concept for this video is that we knew we had to make everything look incredibly beautiful. It was about making a video where the Sugababes felt like they were at the top of their game." The video made its premiere in August 2011. A behind the scenes clip was uploaded to the Sugababes official VEVO channel on YouTube. Daily Mirror praised the band's appearance in the video.

The Sugababes performed "Freedom" on 10 July 2011 at the T4 on the Beach festival. It was the first performance of the song on television, in which group member Jade Ewen told 4Music that they were "really excited about it." In September 2011, the trio performed "Freedom" on several television shows including This Morning, Daybreak, Big Friday Wind Up, and Super Saturday. They also performed the song at London's nightclub G-A-Y, where they wore coordinating rubber outfits.

== Tracklist ==
- Streaming Only.
1. "Freedom" - 3:25
2. "Freedom" (Kris Di Angelis 'Back to 95' Remix) - 6:32
