= Get Sexy =

2009 single by Sugababes

Single by Sugababes

from the album Sweet 7
- Released: 30 August 2009
- Recorded: 2009
- Genre: Electropop; dance-pop; techno; R&B
- Length: 3:14
- Label: Island
- Songwriters: Philip Lawrence; Ari Levine; Bruno Mars; Fred Fairbrass; Richard Fairbrass; Rob Manzoli
- Producer: The Smeezingtons

Sugababes singles chronology
"No Can Do" (2008)	"Get Sexy" (2009)	"About a Girl" (2009)

Music video
- "Get Sexy" on YouTube

"Get Sexy" is a song by British girl group Sugababes, taken from their seventh studio album, Sweet 7 (2010). It was written by Fred Fairbrass, Richard Fairbrass, Rob Manzoli, Philip Lawrence, Ari Levine, Bruno Mars and produced by the latter three under their stage name The Smeezingtons. The song was released on 30 August 2009 as the album's lead single. Musically, "Get Sexy" is an uptempo electropop song with influences of dance, techno and R&B. The song features an interpolation of Right Said Fred's "I'm Too Sexy". It is the final single to feature the group's third line-up, prior to the dismissal of founding member Keisha Buchanan in September 2009.

"Get Sexy" received mixed reviews from contemporary music critics; some reviewers praised its production and lyrics, while others criticised its lack of originality. The song peaked at number two on the UK Singles Chart and number three on the Irish Singles Chart. It also charted on the singles charts in Australia, Austria, Belgium, the Czech Republic, Germany, Slovakia and Sweden. The song's accompanying music video was directed by Emil Nava and features the group's members in a house of mirrors, a bird cage and a room covered in graffiti.

== Background and release ==
In April 2009, Sugababes travelled to the United States to work on their seventh studio album, Sweet 7. They signed a contract with Jay Z's record label, Roc Nation, resulting in working with high-profile producers . "Get Sexy", which was selected as the album's lead single, was written by Fred Fairbrass, Richard Fairbrass, Rob Manzoli, Philip Lawrence, Ari Levine, Bruno Mars and produced by the latter three under their stage name The Smeezingtons. Working with The Smeezingtons was described by group member Amelle Berrabah as an "amazing" and "great opportunity". Berrabah also stated in an interview with Bang Showbiz that the song "doesn't sound like anything we have ever done before". The song premiered on BBC Radio 1 on 7 July 2009 in a show presented by Scott Mills. In an interview for Digital Spy, Keisha Buchanan said that the response to the song was great, saying: "From the beginning there's been a real buzz about the track. It's had a great response from so many people, even if they say, 'Forget about the rest of them, this one I love'." However, later in September 2013 Buchanan said of the song, "I just didn't feel like that was a representation of who we were as a band but we didn't, at that point, have a lot of say." She did say that she enjoyed working with Mars and would like to collaborate on a new song with him and founding Sugababes members Mutya Buena and Siobhán Donaghy.

"Get Sexy" was digitally released on 30 August 2009, while the CD single was made available the following day. Between the release of "Get Sexy" and "About a Girl", Buchanan left the group. As a result, "Get Sexy" was re-recorded along with a number of other tracks to feature the vocals of new member Jade Ewen in place of Buchanan for the release of Sweet 7 in 2010.

== Composition ==
"Get Sexy"
A nineteen second sample of "Get Sexy", featuring the techno synthesizers before the song's chorus.

"Get Sexy" is an uptempo electropop song, with dance, techno and R&B influences. David Balls and Nick Levine of Digital Spy described it as an "electro-R&B club banger". The song has a length of three minutes and 14 seconds. The song was composed in the key of E minor, with a beat set in common time and a tempo moving at 124 beats per minute. "Get Sexy" makes use of techno synthesizers that are present immediately before the song's chorus, which has been described as "siren-peaked". Balls also called the song a "slamming dance anthem".

"Get Sexy" features an interpolation of Right Said Fred's song "I'm Too Sexy", which was composed by Christopher Fairbrass, Richard Fairbrass, and Robert Manzoli. It samples the trademark lyric, "I'm too sexy for my shirt, too sexy for my shirt, so sexy it hurts", but replaces "for my shirt" with "in this club". According to Digital Spy, in an interview with Teletext, Buchanan revealed that inspiration for the song came "by accident", saying: "The producers were messing around going, 'I'm too sexy for the studio'. We were like, 'That sounds cool', and [the producer] said, 'You remember that Right Said Fred song?' We were like, 'Do you think we can do it?' By accident it came together." Balls and Levine compared the song to "Boom Boom Pow" by Black Eyed Peas.

== Critical reception ==
"Get Sexy" garnered mixed reviews from contemporary music critics. Caroline Sullivan of The Guardian described the song as a "grinding, fiercely catchy R&B number". David Balls of Digital Spy gave the song a four out of five star rating, saying: "'Get Sexy' is a dancefloor stomper that nestles somewhere between 'Boom Boom Pow' and 'Bonkers' in its blend of electropop, techno and R&B sounds. It may not be massively original, nor an instant classic to rival 'About You Now' or 'Push the Button', but with a Right Said Fred-sampling hook, a thundering chorus and plenty of attitude – most noticeably from Amelle – it returns Sugababes right to the forefront of the pop landscape.' Popjustice positively reviewed "Get Sexy", saying "'Get Sexy' is a punchy, explosive pop single which while not being quite as adventurous as it thinks it could never be described as a pedestrian". Fraser McAlpine of BBC gave the single a mainly negative review, calling it a "mess" which has "not bothered to make it rhyme" in the way the original, 'I'm Too Sexy' did. McAlpine went on to say: "the 'shut up and watch me walk' bit is pilfered from the Ting Tings. [...] [Amelle's 'silly boys' bit – which is brilliant, by the way – may have more than a passing acquaintance with 'My Humps'. [...] the chorus is desperate for someone to scream 'will.i.am drop the beat now'.

== Chart performance ==
During the first week of its release, "Get Sexy" was ahead of its nearest competitor, "Run This Town", by Jay-Z featuring Rihanna and Kanye West, at number one. Eventually, "Get Sexy" debuted at number two on the UK Singles Chart, selling 55,707 copies in its first week of release. The song spent 9 weeks inside the UK Singles Chart. "Get Sexy" has sold 165,000 copies in the UK, making it their eighth best-selling single in that country. The single debuted and peaked at number three on the Irish Singles Chart, becoming the band's highest-charting single in Ireland since "About You Now". It remained on the chart in the country for seven weeks.

"Get Sexy" peaked at number 42 on the singles chart in Sweden, becoming the group's first single since "About You Now" to chart in the country. The song peaked at number 41 on the German Singles Chart and number 72 on the Austrian Singles Chart. It also charted on the singles charts in the Czech Republic and Slovakia, both at number 48. The song also impacted the charts in Belgium, peaking at numbers 21 and 37 on the Flanders and Wallonia charts, respectively. "Get Sexy" also became the group's first single since "About You Now" to chart in Australia when it debuted at number 76 on the Australian Singles Chart. The following week, it rose to its peak of number 75.

== Music video ==
Sugababes in the room of graffiti in the music video for "Get Sexy".

"Get Sexy"'s music video premiered on 1 August 2009 on More4. The video features Berrabah in a bird cage, Buchanan posing on a couch and Heidi Range in a house of mirrors shot at by intense light beams. During the chorus, all three members are seen standing together with chains around their waists and arms, tying them together. The video ends with the Sugababes in a room covered in graffiti. Popjustice praised the video, saying that it "seems to feature Sugababes 3.0 as 'the full package', and makes sense of this lineup, for the first time. This is a good thing."

== Track listing ==
- Extended play (EP)
1. "Get Sexy" – 3:14
2. "Get Sexy" (Max Sanna & Steve Pitron Mix) – 7:13
3. "Get Sexy" (Bitrocka Remix) – 6:03
4. "Get Sexy" (Superbass Vocal Mix) – 5:23
5. "Get Sexy" (Hadouken! Dub Remix) – 4:57
- CD single
1. "Get Sexy" – 3:14
2. "Get Sexy" (Max Sanna & Steve Pitron Mix) – 7:13
3. "Get Sexy" (Bitrocka Remix) – 6:03
4. "Get Sexy" (Superbass Vocal Mix) – 5:23
- European CD single
1. "Get Sexy" – 3:14
2. "Get Sexy" (Superbass Vocal Mix) – 5:23

== Credits and personnel ==
- Bruno Mars - songwriting, instruments, production
- Philip Lawrence - songwriting, production
- Ari Levine - songwriting, instruments, recording, mixing, production
- Richard Fairbrass - songwriting
- Fred Fairbrass - songwriting
- Rob Manzoli - songwriting
- The Smeezingtons - production
- Mike Stevens - additional vocal production
- Marcus Byrne - additional vocal production
- Jeremy Wheatley - additional vocal mixing
- Richard Edgeler - additional vocal mixing

Credits adapted from the liner notes of Sweet 7.

== Charts ==
Chart performance for "Get Sexy"
Chart (2009)	Peak position
Australia (ARIA)	75
Austria (Ö3 Austria Top 40)	72
Belgium (Ultratop 50 Flanders)	21
Belgium (Ultratop 50 Wallonia)	37
Croatia (HRT)	12
Czech Republic Airplay (ČNS IFPI)	32
European Hot 100 (Billboard)	9
Germany (GfK)	41
Ireland (IRMA)	3
Slovakia Airplay (ČNS IFPI)	48
Sweden (Sverigetopplistan)	42
UK Singles (Official Charts)	2
UK Airplay (Music Week)	7

== Certifications ==
Certifications for "Get Sexy"
Region	Certification	Certified units/sales
United Kingdom (BPI)	Silver	200,000^{‡}
^{‡} Sales+streaming figures based on certification alone.

== Release history ==
Region	Date	Format	Label
Australia	30 August 2009	Extended play	Island Records
Brazil	30 August 2009	Extended play	Island Records
Finland	30 August 2009	Extended play	Island Records
Greece	30 August 2009	Extended play	Island Records
Ireland	30 August 2009	Extended play	Island Records
New Zealand	30 August 2009	Extended play	Island Records
Poland	30 August 2009	Extended play	Island Records
Portugal	30 August 2009	Extended play	Island Records
Sweden	30 August 2009	Extended play	Island Records
United Kingdom	30 August 2009	Extended play	Island Records
United Kingdom	31 August 2009	CD single	Island Records
Argentina	14 September 2009	Digital download	Island Records
Australia	14 September 2009	Digital download	Island Records
Belgium	14 September 2009	Digital download	Island Records
Brazil	14 September 2009	Digital download	Island Records
Czech Republic	14 September 2009	Digital download	Island Records
Denmark	14 September 2009	Digital download	Island Records
Finland	14 September 2009	Digital download	Island Records
France	14 September 2009	Digital download	Island Records
Germany	14 September 2009	Digital download	Island Records
Hungary	14 September 2009	Digital download	Island Records
New Zealand	14 September 2009	Digital download	Island Records
Norway	14 September 2009	Digital download	Island Records
Poland	14 September 2009	Digital download	Island Records
Slovakia	14 September 2009	Digital download	Island Records
Sweden	14 September 2009	Digital download	Island Records
