= Amelle Berrabah =

English singer (born 1984)

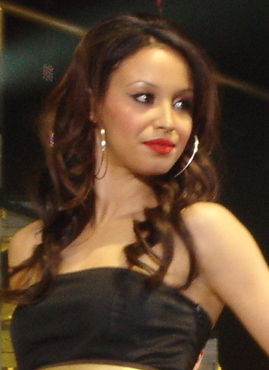
- Berrabah in 2006

Background information
- Born: 22 April 1984 (age 42)
- Origin: Aldershot, Hampshire, England
- Genres: Pop; dance-pop; R&B
- Occupation: Singer
- Years active: 2003–present
- Labels: Island; Roc Nation; RCA
- Formerly of: Sugababes

Amelle Sousa Berrabah (born 22 April 1984), also known as Amelle, is an English singer. She is best known for being a former member of the girl group the Sugababes, replacing founding member Mutya Buena, who left the group in December 2005. She achieved a solo number one single in 2009 when she featured on Tinchy Stryder's single "Never Leave You", which made her the only member of the Sugababes to achieve a number-one single outside of the group.

== Early life ==
Amelle Sousa Berrabah was born on 22 April 1984 in Aldershot, Hampshire to Moroccan parents. She has four sisters, younger sister Samiya, older sisters Laila, Zakiya and Nora and a brother, Khaled. Her family owned a kebab shop in Aldershot. Berrabah's father died of cancer in 2002. Berrabah attended The Connaught School in Aldershot and the Academy of Contemporary Music in Guildford, the latter on the merit of a scholarship. It was then that she met her managers and formed the group Boo2 with her sister, Samiya, and began looking for record contract opportunities. She won Top of the Pops magazine's Star Search in 2003 that gave her the chance to be the lead singer of a new group and had performed at Party in the Park as well.

== Career ==
=== 2006–2008: Success with the Sugababes ===
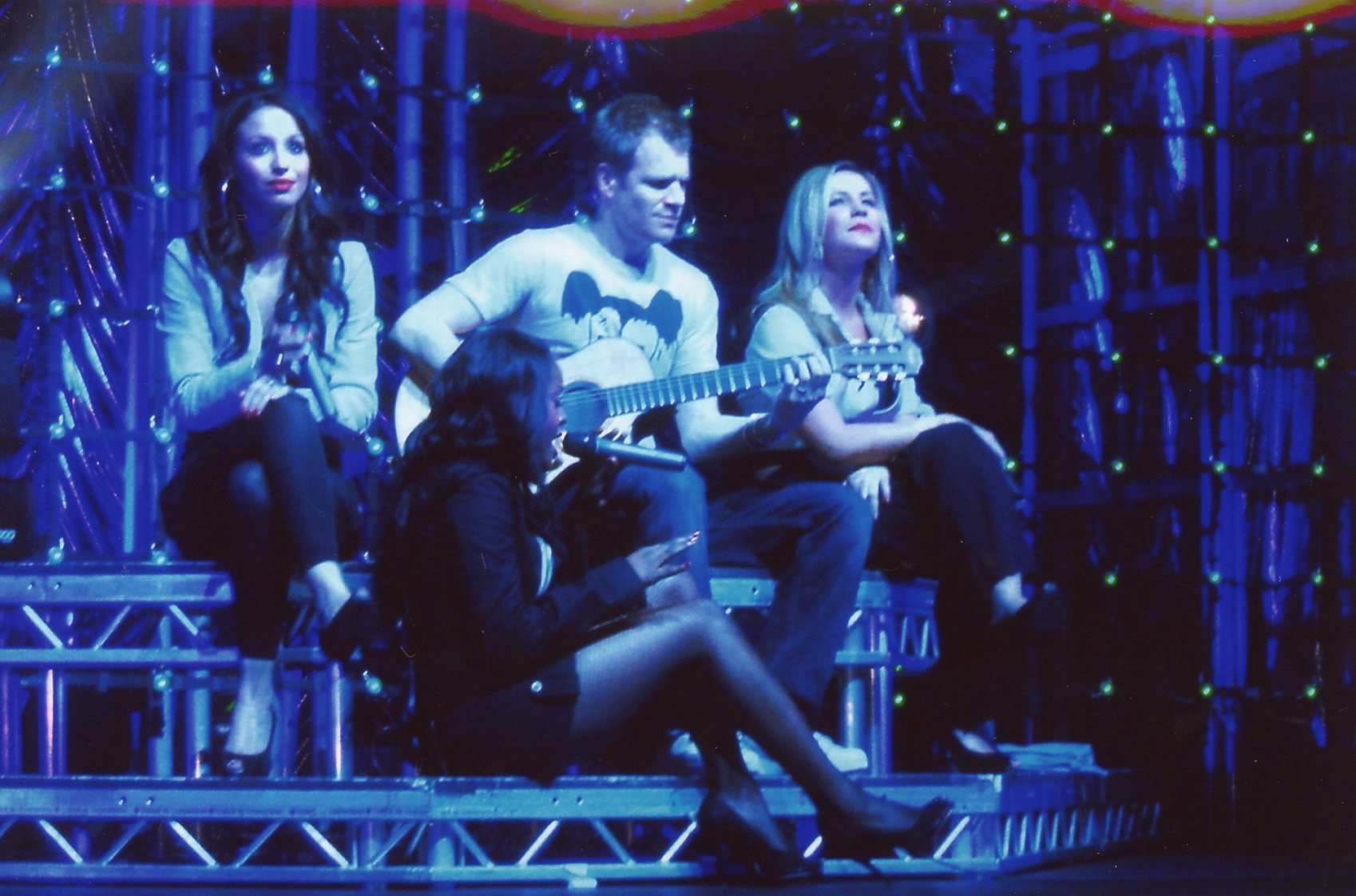
Berrabah in 2006, performing on the Taller in More Ways Tour

Following Mutya Buena's departure from Sugababes, Berrabah was brought in as a replacement by the group's management. Their manager had seen Berrabah perform at an American showcase a few years prior in 2003 and Berrabah had impressed him. As soon as Buena left, he gave Berrabah a call about the opportunity and got her to record three songs to audition for remaining members Keisha Buchanan and Heidi Range. They liked the demos and Berrabah was then announced as the newest member of the trio. The first single to feature Berrabah's vocals, "Red Dress", entered the UK Singles Chart at number four. Taller in More Ways was re-released in early 2006 with re-recorded vocals by Berrabah. Because of the hastiness of the replacement, she could only re-record vocals for three of the tracks on the album. She also contributed the song, "Now You're Gone" to the new track listing. They performed the 2007 Comic Relief single with fellow girl band, Girls Aloud, "Walk This Way", which went to number one. On 28 April 2007, Berrabah was arrested over allegations that she had assaulted a girl on the dancefloor in a club. No charges were brought.

The first single from their album Change, the Dr. Luke-produced "About You Now", topped the UK Singles Chart for four weeks. In October 2007, Change became the group's second UK Albums Chart number one, giving the group the top position on the singles and albums charts simultaneously. Berrabah was credited with co-writing five songs on the album. Berrabah was arrested again on 10 January 2008 on suspicion of causing criminal damage and a public order offence. The arrest was made in connection with an alleged attack on a car in her hometown of Aldershot on 9 January 2008. The charges were quickly dropped when it was revealed that she was not even in town at the time. Despite announcing a break after the Change tour, the group quickly began working on Catfights and Spotlights, which was released in late 2008 and became their lowest charting album at the time.

=== 2009–2011: Solo success and group turmoil ===
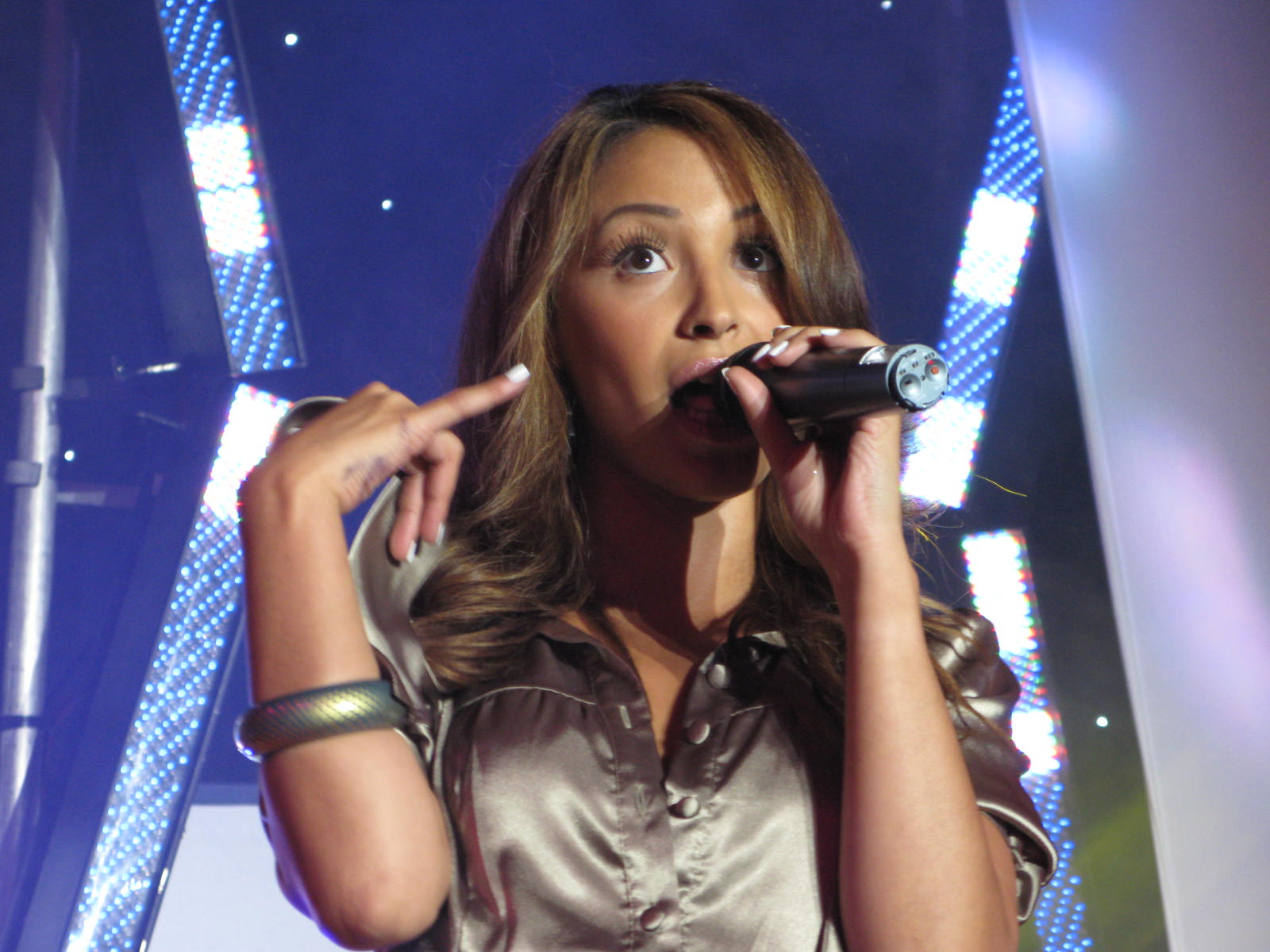
Berrabah performing at Kidscape in London in 2007

After the commercial disappointment of Catfights and Spotlights, the group began working on the album Sweet 7, signing with Roc Nation and working with their in-house producers in the US. Around this time, Berrabah also featured on "Never Leave You" by Tinchy Stryder in 2009, the single debuted at number one in the UK. The first single, "Get Sexy", from Sweet 7 was released soon after and reached number 2 on the UK charts. Prior to shooting the video for the second single, RedOne production "About a Girl", Berrabah was rumoured to have left the group. She had missed two engagements promoting the album. It was later revealed that in fact Buchanan had been removed due to disagreements with Berrabah and Range, and replaced by Jade Ewen. Berrabah and Range had earlier quit the Sugababes claiming that they could not work in the group any longer, their management then retained them and removed Buchanan instead. Following these events, Berrabah checked into a European health clinic for a three-week stay, citing "severe nervous exhaustion". Sweet 7 was released in early 2010 after multiple delays from late 2009. It charted at number 14 on the UK Albums Chart.

The Sugababes began recording a new studio album soon after, leaving Island Records for a distribution deal with RCA Records in 2011. The first single, was intended to be the song "Freedom" was released for free in August as a gift to fans. A few months after the release, Range explained that the Sugababes were taking a break while they pursued individual endeavours.

=== 2011–present: Solo career ===
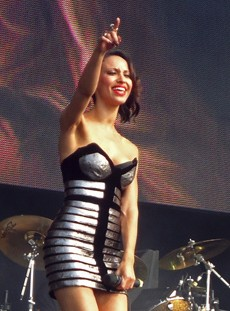
Berrabah performing in 2011

Berrabah began working on solo material in 2011 with producer Pete Kirtley, who had previously produced her co-writing contribution, "Now You're Gone" from Taller in More Ways and material by Boo2. In January 2012, Berrabah confirmed she had been working on a solo album. A clip of the song "God Won't Save You Now" was posted to the SoundCloud account of Kirtley and fellow producer Sacha Collisson, who are collectively known as D-B-X. The full song leaked a few weeks later. On 6 March 2012, it was reported Berrabah had gone to Los Angeles to record new material for the album. Berrabah was featured on the song "Ordinary Me" by rapper Mr. Bigz on the latter's mixtape The Bigz Bang Theory in late 2012.

In May 2013, Berrabah confirmed she had nearly completed work on her solo album, and was looking to release the collection some time in the summer. Berrabah had earlier stated that she had written every song on the album apart from two. Berrabah teamed up with British DJ Adam J for his single "Love (Is All We Need)", and featured production team The Nightcrashers. Berrabah released another single, "Summertime", on 21 September 2014. During this time, Berrabah also made a series of appearances on reality competitions, competing in the BBC celebrity gymnastics show Tumble (with professional partner Douglas Fordyce) in mid-2014, and Celebrity Masterchef in 2016. She made her theatre debut in 2019, with the jukebox musical Club Tropicana.

In January 2022, Berrabah was announced as the presenter of the late show on Milton Keynes radio station MKFM.

== Personal life ==
Berrabah married Marcio Sousa Rosa on 17 October 2014 and the couple filed for divorce in 2020. They share a daughter, Amirah Hope.

== Discography ==
=== Singles ===
Title	Year	Chart positions			Certifications	Album
Title	Year	UK	IRE	EU	Certifications	Album
"Never Leave You" (with Tinchy Stryder)	2009	1	2	5	BPI: Gold	Catch 22
"Love (Is All We Need)" (with Adam J and Nightcrashers)	2013	—	—	—		Non-album singles
"Summertime"	2014	—	—	—		Non-album singles

=== Other appearances ===
List of guest appearances, with other performing artists, showing year released and album name
Title	Year	Other performer(s)	Album
"Til the End"	2010	Tinchy Stryder	Third Strike
"Ordinary Me"	2013	Bigz	The Bigz Bang Theory (Mixtape)
"Testify"	2018	K-SYRAN	Journey

=== Music videos ===
List of featured music videos, showing year released and director
Title	Year	Director(s)	Ref.
"Never Leave You" (with Tinchy Stryder)	2009	Emil Nava	
"Love Is All We Need" (with Adam J and Nightcrashers)	2013	N/A	

== Songwriting credits ==
Song	Year	Artist	Album	Notes
"Now You're Gone"	2006	Sugababes	Taller in More Ways	Co-writer
"Easy"	2006	Sugababes	Overloaded: The Singles Collection	Co-writer
"Good to be Gone"	2006	Sugababes	Overloaded: The Singles Collection	Co-writer
"Denial"	2007	Sugababes	Change	Co-writer
"Change"	2007	Sugababes	Change	Co-writer
"Back Down"	2007	Sugababes	Change	Co-writer
"Undignified"	2007	Sugababes	Change	Co-writer
"Sunday Rain"	2008	Sugababes	Catfights and Spotlights	Co-writer
"Beware"	2008	Sugababes	Catfights and Spotlights	Co-writer
