= Jade Ewen =

English singer and actress (born 1988)

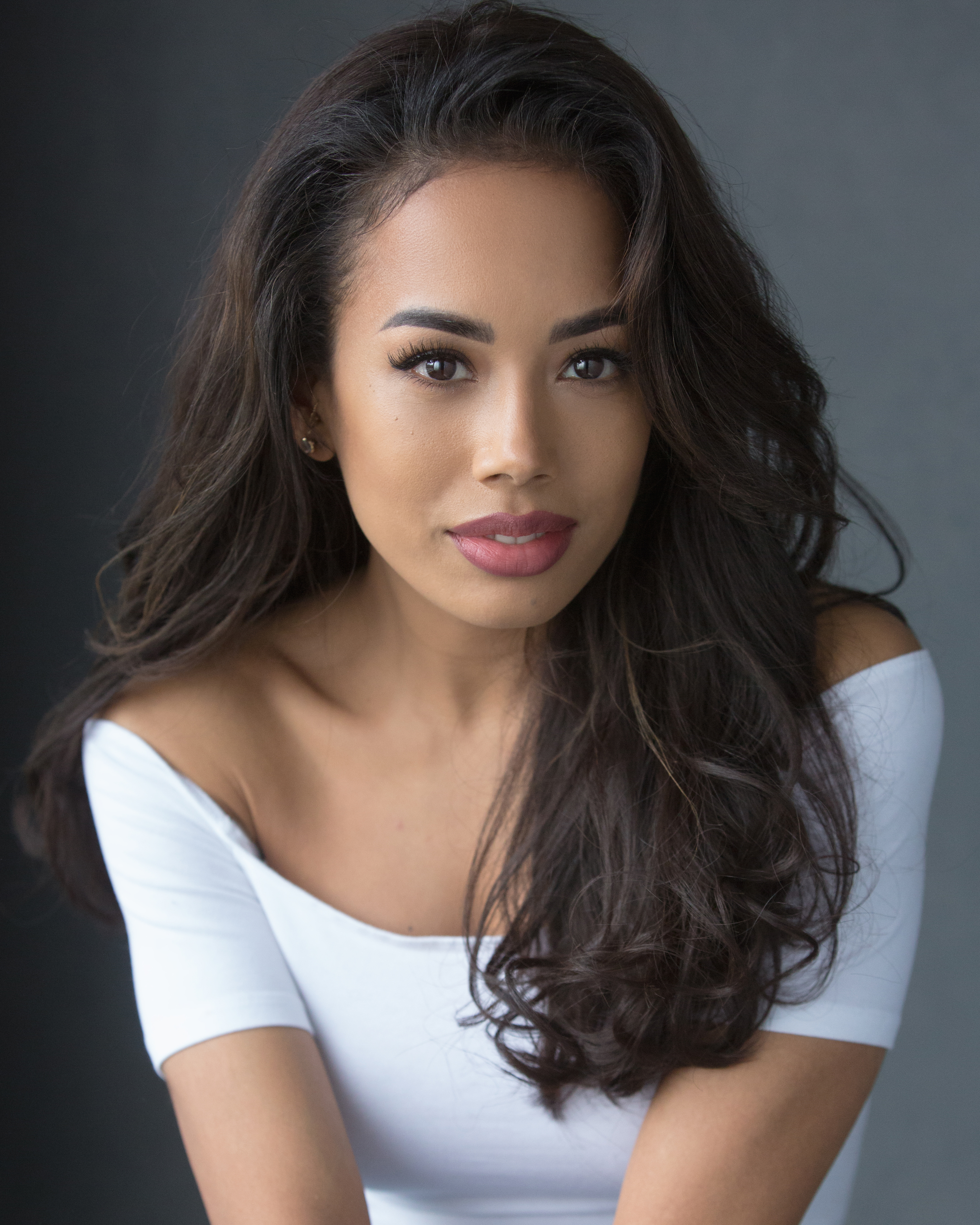
- Ewen in 2018

Background information
- Born: Jade Louise Ewen; 24 January 1988 (age 38)
- Origin: Plaistow, Newham, London, England
- Genres: Pop; dance-pop; electropop; Europop; R&B
- Occupations: Singer; actress
- Years active: 2002–present
- Labels: Geffen; Polydor; Island; RCA
- Formerly of: Sugababes

Jade Louise Ewen (born 24 January 1988) is an English singer, actress and a former member of the girl group Sugababes. She began her singing career in a girl group named Trinity Stone, which signed with Sony BMG in 2005 but disbanded in 2007 without releasing an album. In 2009, after winning the right, she represented the United Kingdom in the Eurovision Song Contest 2009 by performing the Andrew Lloyd Webber / Diane Warren penned "It's My Time". She finished in fifth place.

Ewen replaced Keisha Buchanan in the group Sugababes in September 2009. After becoming a member of the group, the group achieved two UK top-ten singles and a top-fifteen album before disbanding in 2011.

In 2015, Ewen made her West End debut, playing Vanessa in the original London cast of In the Heights, following a brief run off-West End the previous year. She went on to play Princess Jasmine in 2016, as part of the original cast of Disney's production of Aladdin.

== Early life ==
Ewen was born on 24 January 1988 and grew up in Plaistow, London, the child of Trevor and Carol Ewen. Her mother is Jamaican while her father is Scottish and has Italian ancestry. Trevor is blind and partially deaf, while Carol is visually impaired. Because of her parents' disabilities, Ewen is a caregiver to both of her parents as well as her two younger siblings, Shereen and Kiel. Ewen started singing and taking dance classes before she was four. She attended New City Primary School then Brampton Manor Academy before transferring to the Sylvia Young Theatre School (SYTS) after receiving a scholarship. While a student at SYTS, she appeared in the television productions The Bill, Casualty, Mr. Harvey Lights a Candle and The Ghost Hunter. At the age of ten, Ewen went to an open audition for The Lion King. She was offered the part of Young Nala.

== Career ==
=== 2002–2009: Early career and Eurovision ===
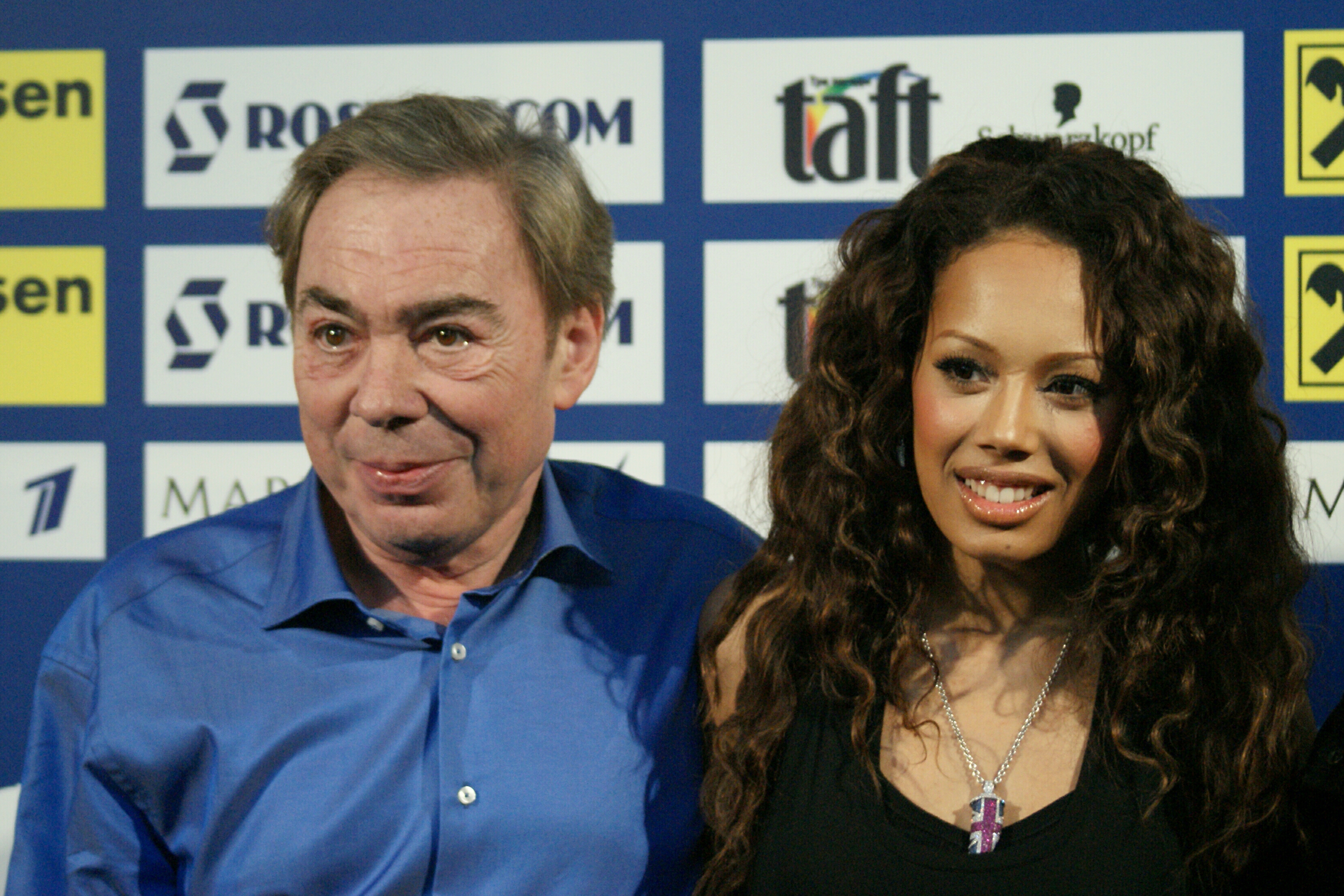
Ewen with Andrew Lloyd Webber in 2009

Ewen appeared in the children's dance DVD, How To Dance. She was briefly featured in the video for Busted's "What I Go to School For". From 2003 to 2004, she appeared in the Noggin series Out There. In 2005, Ewen became a member of the girl group Trinity Stone, which signed with Sony BMG. The group disbanded in 2007. She later recorded with rapper Kwamé, who was impressed with her work on MySpace. She released a digital single, "Got You", in 2008 under Kwame's Make Noise label. Ewen co-wrote the song "A Little Bit" for the girl group Booty Luv, as well as the song "Let Me Be Me" for Jessica Mauboy. In early 2009, Ewen acted in the first episode of the series Myths.

In January 2009, Ewen was approached for and participated in the process to select the UK representative for the Eurovision Song Contest 2009. She was selected to represent the UK with her performance of the song "It's My Time", composed by Andrew Lloyd Webber, who accompanied her on piano. Ewen finished in fifth place at Eurovision with 173 points, which at the time was the highest placing for the UK since 2002 and the UK's second-highest point total ever. The United Kingdom has only scored a higher points total and a higher placing once since "It's My Time" - in 2022, when Sam Ryder finished 2nd with 466 points (under a revised scoring system). Having already signed with Polydor Records before the Eurovision selection, Ewen began working on her debut album.

=== 2009–2011: Sugababes and solo projects ===
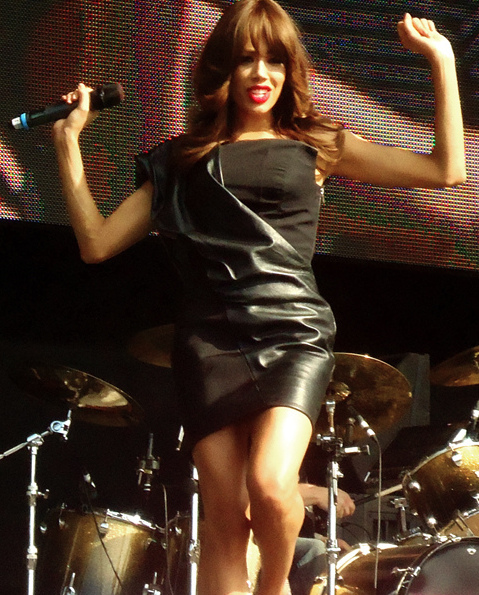
Jade Ewen performing with the Sugababes in 2011

In September 2009, Ewen joined the group Sugababes as the replacement for Keisha Buchanan. While her single, "My Man", had been released the week she joined the trio, promotional activities for it were cancelled. Nonetheless, it debuted at number 35 on the UK Singles Chart. In an interview with the BBC, Ewen confirmed her commitment to the Sugababes was her main priority and that her solo album had been put on hold. Ewen did not meet the members of the Sugababes until two days before the video shoot for their single "About a Girl" in Los Angeles, having been flown there without being notified that she would be replacing Buchanan. "About a Girl" debuted at number eight in the UK. Sweet 7 was released in early 2010 after multiple delays during 2009, and charted at number 14 on the UK Albums Chart. The second single to feature Ewen's vocals, "Wear My Kiss", peaked at number 7 in the UK.

The Sugababes began recording an eighth studio album in April 2010. In late 2010, Ewen became the face of Miss Ultimo lingerie. In 2011, the group and their management, Crown Talent & Media Group, left their record label of ten years, Island Records, for a new three-album distribution deal with Sony Music's RCA Records. Crown Talent & Media Group was the acting record label. A promotional single under the new label, "Freedom", was released for free on 25 September 2011.

=== 2013–present: West End, stage and television work ===
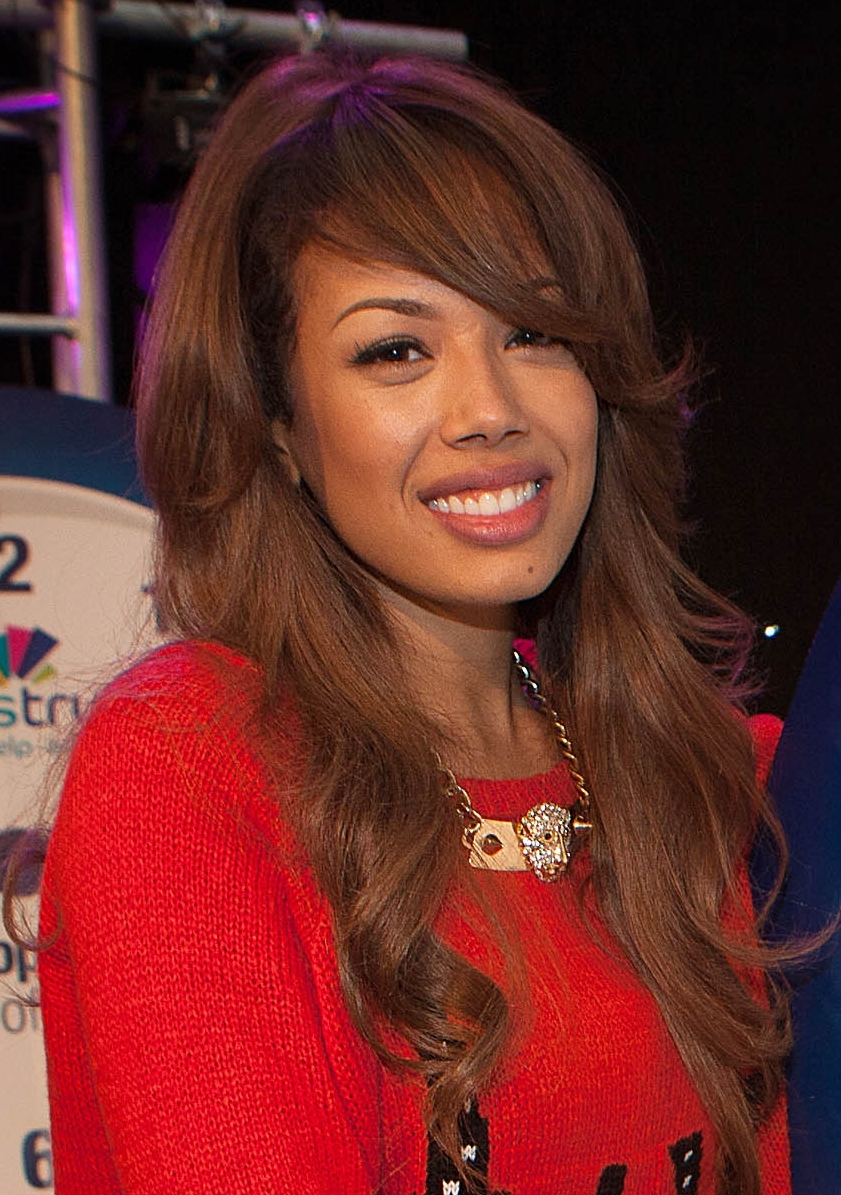
Ewen in 2013

On 15 March 2013, Ewen confirmed that Sugababes would record new music at some point during 2013, stating: "I think we will probably come back together again at the end of the year. There will definitely be more recording but, there is no release date anytime soon." On 1 August 2013, she revealed the Sugababes were no longer recording in the studio together, stating the group was "pretty much done".

In summer 2014, Ewen played the supporting role of Clara in the Regent's Park Open Air Theatre production of Porgy and Bess. The musical opened to 4 and 5 star reviews, with The Guardian writing of Ewen's performance: "Jade Ewen brings a moving simplicity to Clara, who follows her heart and pays the price." In April 2015, Jade was due to have a lead role in Godspell at the Hackney Empire, before moving on to a 28-venue national tour. Ewen had to drop out due to ill health, saying she was "saddened" to withdraw. In September 2015, it was announced that Jade would be joining the cast of In the Heights in its West End transfer, in the role of Vanessa. The musical received positive reviews. In November 2015, it was announced that she would play the role of Princess Jasmine in the musical Aladdin at the Prince Edward Theatre. Ewen later sued Disney for over £200,000 alleging damage to her voice from having to sing too loudly to be heard over Matthew Croke who played Aladdin.

== Discography ==
=== Singles ===
==== As lead artist ====
Year	Title	Peak chart positions				Album
Year	Title	UK	GER	SWE	SWI	Album
2008	"Got You"	—	—	—	—	—N/a
2009	"It's My Time"	27	75	34	75	—N/a
2009	"My Man"	35	—	—	—	—N/a
"—" denotes a single that did not chart or was not released.

==== As featured artist ====
Year	Title	Album
2014	"Fly" (Lost Witness featuring Jade Ewen)	—N/a

=== Music videos ===
Year	Title	Director
2009	"It's My Time"	Pop Club
2009	"My Man"	Urban Strom

== Filmography ==
=== Television ===
Year	Title	Role	Notes
2001	The Ghost Hunter	Leonie Price	5 episodes
2003–04	Out There	Aggie Thackery	25 episodes
2005	Mr. Harvey Lights a Candle	Donna	
2005	Casualty	Carrie Fletcher	1 episode
2005	The Bill	Shanti Das	2 episodes
2009	Myths	Athene	1 episode
2009	Eurovision: Your Country Needs You!	Contestant	5 episodes (Won)
2010	Eurovision: Your Country Needs You!	Judge	1 episode
2013	Splash!	Contestant	1 episode
2015	Casualty	Billie-Jayne Lowe	1 episode
2016	Tracey Ullman's Show	Various	7 episodes
2017	Tracey Breaks the News	Various	3 episodes
2018	Lovesick	Miranda	1 episode
2020	There She Goes	Sam	1 episode
2021	Luis Miguel: The Series	Mariah Carey	5 episodes
2023	Paris Christmas Waltz	Giselle	Television movie

=== Cinema ===
Year	Title	Role	Notes
2016	End of a Gun	Lisa Durant	

Preceded by Andy Abraham with "Even If"	UK in the Eurovision Song Contest; 2009	Succeeded by Josh Dubovie with "That Sounds Good to Me"
