= No Point in Wasting Tears =

Studio album by Ironik
- Released: 29 September 2008; 11 May 2009 (re-release)
- Recorded: 2007–2008
- Genre: Hip hop, R&B, grime
- Label: Asylum, Atlantic, Warner
- Producer: Agent X

Singles from No Point in Wasting Tears
- 1. "Stay with Me" Released: 22 June 2008; 2. "I Wanna Be Your Man" Released: 15 September 2008; 3. "Tiny Dancer (Hold Me Closer)" Released: 27 April 2009

No Point in Wasting Tears is the debut album by Ironik and was released on 29 September 2008. The album entered the UK Albums Chart at number 21 but fell to number 36 in its second week. It was removed from the UK iTunes Store, but subsequently fully re-released on 11 May 2009, following the success of the album's third single, "Tiny Dancer (Hold Me Closer)," which reached number three on the UK Singles Chart.

== Singles ==
- The first official single from the album was "Stay With Me". The song charted at #5 on the UK Singles Chart.
- The second single was "I Wanna Be Your Man," which was released in digital form on 18 September, where it charted at #128 until the physical release one week later, when it peaked at no #35.
- The third single is a remix of Tiny Dancer (Hold Me Closer), which now features Chipmunk as well as Sir Elton John. The song was released on 27 April 2009. The song entered the UK Singles Chart on 3 May at #3. It is Ironik's highest charting single to date.

== Track list ==
No.	Title	Writer(s)	Producer(s)	Length
1.	"Stay with Me (Everybody's Free)"	Ironik, Tim Cox, Nigel Swanston	Louis Gibzen	3:24
2.	"I Wanna Be Your Man"	Ironik	Agent X	2:57
3.	"Amazing"	Ironik, Vandross, E.Howard	Marcus Killian	3:04
4.	"Tiny Dancer (Hold Me Closer) (Featuring Chipmunk and Elton John)"	Elton John, Bernie Taupin, Ironik	Simon Franglen	3:23
5.	"Tracy"	Ironik, G.Bonnick, L.Price	Agent X	3:08
6.	"Broken (Featuring McLean)"	McLean, N.Clarke	Simon Frangien & Ironik	3:58
7.	"So Nice (Featuring Baby Sol)"	Ironik, W.Gresford, N.Webb, M.Chalk	Will Gresford & Nick Webb	3:08
8.	"I'm Leaving (Featuring Ny)"	Ironik, Ny, Seun Ajayi	Nocturnal	2:50
9.	"5 Hours"	Ironik, E.Dean, T.Hale, T.Stewart, Mýa	Will Gresford & Nick Webb	2:04
10.	"Would You Like That (Featuring Bless Beats & Daniel de Bourg)"	Ironik, Bless Beats, D.de Bourg	Bless Beats	3:02
11.	"I Love You (Featuring McLean)"	Ironik, McLean, W.Gresford, N.Webb	Will Gresford & Nick Webb	3:35
12.	"Sometimes It Snows In April (Ironik Presents Lain James & Ny)"	P.R.Nelson, W.Melvion, L.Coleman	Marcus Killian	5:23
13.	"Save A Little Love (Featuring McLean)"	Ironik, Winans, Jones, Serrano	Sie Medway-Smith	3:41
14.	"Mum (Featuring Young Nate, Shay, Melody & Soundbwoy Ent)"	Ironik, K.B Edmonds	Sie Medway-Smith	3:31
15.	"Imagine (Featuring Gabriella Ellis)"	C.Deakin	Sie Medway-Smith	4:02
16.	"Foot Patrol (Ironik Presents Daniel de Bourg)"	Ironik, D.de Bourg, A.Birgisson, A.Jonussi	Arnthor & Will Gresford	4:32
17.	"I Wanna Be Your Man (Ironik Vs Bless Beats Featuring Tinchy Stryder, Ghetto & Daniel de Bourg)"	Ironik,	Agent X	4:00
18.	"Stay With Me (Featuring Wiley & Chipmunk)"	Ironik, Tim Cox, Nigel Swanston	Louis Gibzen	3:09
19.	"Tiny Dancer (Hold Me Closer)"(Elton John)"	Elton John, Bernie Taupin, Ironik	Matt Ward, Dean Gillard	3:10

== Charts ==
Chart (2008)	Peak position
UK Albums Chart	21
