= It Was This or Football =

Studio album by Kid British
- Released: First half: 20 July 2009; Full version: unreleased
- Recorded: 2008–2009
- Label: Mercury
- Producer: Stephen Street, Steve Dub

Kid British chronology
iTunes Live: London; Festival '09 (2009)	It Was This or Football (2009)	To Get Nowhere, Follow the Crowd (2010)

Singles from It Was This or Football
- 1. "Elizabeth" Released: 27 October 2008; 2. "Leave London" Released: 1 January 2009; 3. "Sunny Days" Released: 20 April 2009; 4. "Our House Is Dadless" Released: 4 July 2009

Professional ratings
Review scores
Source	Rating
Metro	2/5 stars

It Was This or Football was the intended first album by the British ska/indie band Kid British. The album was originally scheduled to be released via Mercury Records in two halves, like a football match – this idea was inspired by the title of the album, and the first half was released as an EP on 20 July 2009.

However, the second half of the album was cancelled with the band stating on their Facebook page that they had been recording new tracks for the album and that a new full version of It Was This or Football would be released in summer 2010. It was later announced that the band's next album would instead be called To Get Nowhere, Follow the Crowd, due for release in October 2010.

In building up promotion for the release of the album, the band supported the Enemy and the Specials on UK tours.

The first half of the album reached #67 on the UK Albums Chart.

== Track listing ==
=== First half (EP) ===
1. "Elizabeth"
2. "Our House Is Dadless"
3. "She Will Leave"
4. "Part Time Job/Shirt & Tie"
5. "Reaction"
6. "Cosmopolitan"

=== Full version ===
The original track listing was as follows:

1. "Elizabeth"
2. "Rum Boys"
3. "Our House Is Dadless"
4. "Sunny Days"
5. "Lost in London"
6. "Reaction"
7. "She Will Leave"
8. "Delivery Man"
9. "Drive Thru"
10. "Gorgeous"
11. "Gonna Be Alright"
12. "Cosmopolitan"

This was listed in online shops and sent out as review copies in 2009.
