= Alban Préaubert =

French figure skater (born 1985)

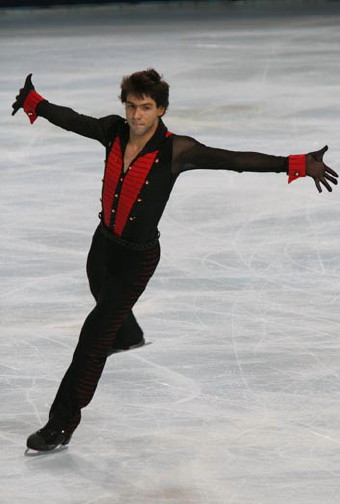
- Préaubert at the 2008 Trophée Eric Bompard.

Personal information
- Born: 20 September 1985 (age 41) Grenoble, France
- Height: 1.82 m (6 ft 0 in)

Figure skating career
- Country: France
- Skating club: CMSG Charleville Mezieres
- Began skating: 1991
- Retired: 2011
Medal record
Representing France
Figure skating: Men's singles
World Junior Championships
Bronze medal – third place	2003 Ostrava	Men's singles

Alban Préaubert (born 20 September 1985) is a French former competitive figure skater. He won six ISU Grand Prix medals and five French national bronze medals (2006, 2008–11).

== Personal life ==
Alban Préaubert was born on 20 September 1985 in Grenoble, France. His studies focused on economy and management. He graduated with an MBA from ESCP Europe in May 2010. He expressed interest in sports management. As of 2011, he works for an asset management company in Paris. He has a red belt in judo.

== Skating career ==
Préaubert began skating in 1991. He was immediately attracted to skating after his father brought him to an ice rink to improve his balance for skiing.

Early in his career, he trained with Elena Issatchenko, champion of the USSR in 1965 and 1966, at Charleville-Mezieres. He later moved to work with coach Annick Dumont. Préaubert won the French junior national title and a medal on the Junior Grand Prix circuit. He skated at both junior and senior events in 2004–05.

=== 2005–06 season ===
Préaubert had a successful season in his first full year as a senior, with a podium finish at the 2006 French nationals, a 6th place showing at his first Europeans, and an 8th place in his World Championships debut.

=== 2006–07 season ===
For the 2006–07 Grand Prix season, Préaubert was assigned to 2006 Skate America and the 2006 Trophée Eric Bompard; he won the bronze and silver medals, respectively, qualifying him for the Grand Prix Final, where he finished fourth. He again finished sixth at the European Championships, but dropped out of the top ten at Worlds.

=== 2007–08 season ===
In 2007–08, Préaubert was again assigned to Skate America and the Trophée Eric Bompard; a fifth-place finish at Skate America dropped him out of contention for the Grand Prix final. He was tenth at the European Championships and was forced to withdraw from Worlds due to a back injury.

=== 2008–09 season ===
Préaubert began the 2008–09 season by defeating his countryman Brian Joubert at the French Masters and winning his third Trophée Eric Bompard medal, a bronze. He also won the bronze at the Cup of Russia and was an alternate for the Grand Prix Final. He finished third at French Nationals and was selected to go to Europeans, where he finished in fifth place, but was only third among the French skaters. As a result, Préaubert was not chosen to compete at the World Championships.

=== 2009–10 season ===
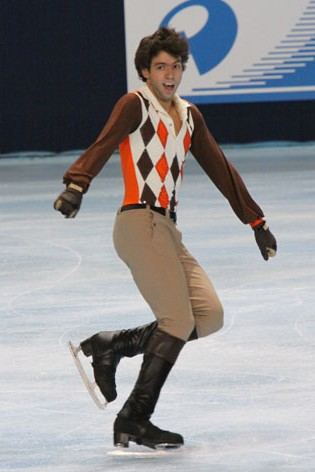
Préaubert in 2009

In the 2009–10 season, Préaubert again medalled on the Grand Prix circuit, winning bronze at Skate Canada. He again finished third at French nationals. The French men were competing for only two spots at the Olympics, and Préaubert, along with runner-up Yannick Ponsero, were selected for the European Championships only. There, Préaubert came in 7th. In March 2010, he participated in a French federation test skate to determine the second entry for the World Championships; Brian Joubert was eventually chosen.

=== 2010–11 season ===
Préaubert finished fifth and sixth at his two Grand Prix assignments in 2010–11, and followed this with his fifth bronze medal at French nationals. It was his final competitive season.

== Programs ==
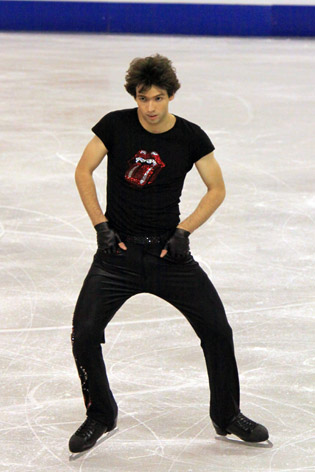
Préaubert performs his Rolling Stones program in 2009

Season	Short program	Free skating	Exhibition
2010–11	Turtle shoes by Bobby McFerrin	Three Piano Pieces No. 2 in E-flat major by Franz Schubert	Twist and Shout by the Beatles; When a Man Loves a Woman by Percy Sledge; Shout by The Isley Brothers
2009–10	Orange Mecanique arranged by Maxime Rodriguez	Medley by The Rolling Stones	El Tango by Mickels Réa
2008–09	Exit Music by Radiohead	Kalinka; Les bateliers de la Volga by Maxime Rodriguez	Go down Moses by Louis Armstrong; I Put a Spell on You by Screamin' Jay Hawkins
2007–08	Parisienne Walkways by Gary Moore; The Addams Family by Marc Shaiman	Bram Stoker's Dracula by Wojciech Kilar; Interview with the Vampire by Elliot Goldenthal	Navras (from The Matrix Revolutions); Mirza by Nino Ferrer
2006–07	Night on Bald Mountain by Modest Mussorgsky; Le vol du bourdon by Robert Wells	I, the Jury by Franz Waxman; Swing Kids by James Horner; Fosse; The Mask by James Horner	If You Go Away by Shirley Bassey; You Are So Beautiful by Joe Cocker
2005–06	Night on Bald Mountain by Modest Mussorgsky; Le vol du bourdon by Robert Wells	Blues Jazz selection by Dave Brubeck; Paris, Texas by Ry Cooder; Music by The Doors	Brice de Nice by Ray Charles
2004–05	Jaleo Project by Louis Winsberg	Adios nonino by Astor Piazzolla	Medley by Queen
2003–04	The Köln Concert by Keith Jarrett	Music by Hugues Le Bars	Robot
2002–03	The Köln Concert by Keith Jarrett	Music by Santana, Daft Punk, Peter Gabriel	I Got You (I Feel Good) by James Brown

== Competitive highlights ==
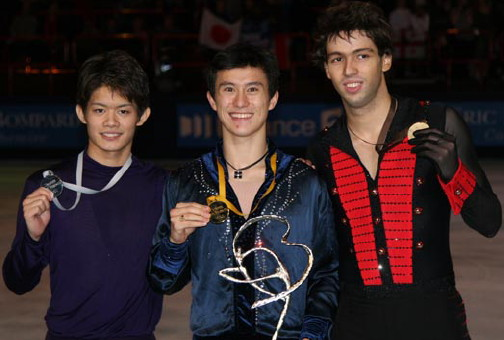
Préaubert after winning the bronze medal at the 2008 Trophée Eric Bompard

GP: Grand Prix; JGP: Junior Grand Prix

International
Event	01–02	02–03	03–04	04–05	05–06	06–07	07–08	08–09	09–10	10–11
Worlds					8th	11th	WD			
Europeans					6th	6th	10th	5th	7th	10th
GP Final						4th				
GP Bompard				8th		2nd	3rd	3rd	7th	
GP Cup of China					9th					
GP Cup of Russia					6th			3rd		5th
GP NHK Trophy				10th						
GP Skate Canada									3rd	6th
GP Skate America						3rd	5th			
Cup of Nice									2nd	3rd
Ice Challenge									3rd	
Triglav Trophy								1st		
Universiade					6th			3rd		
International: Junior
Junior Worlds		3rd	4th	9th						
JGP Croatia			2nd							
JGP Germany		8th								
JGP Slovakia		11th								
JGP Slovenia			4th							
National
French Champ.	7th J.	2nd J.	1st J.	6th	3rd	WD	3rd	3rd	3rd	3rd
Masters			3rd	2nd	5th	2nd	3rd	1st	3rd	3rd
J. = Junior level; WD = Withdrew
