= Hold Me Closer =

Hold Me Closer may refer to:

- "Hold Me Closer" (Cornelia Jakobs song)
- "Hold Me Closer" (Elton John and Britney Spears song)

== See also ==
- "Tiny Dancer (Hold Me Closer)", a 2009 song by Ironik featuring Chipmunk
