= Marine (singer) =

French singer-songwriter (born 2000)

- Born: Marine Delplace; 29 March 2000 (age 26); Arras, France
- Genre: Chanson
- Occupations: Singer; songwriter; musician
- Instruments: Vocals; piano
- Years active: 2015–present
- Label: Columbia Records (Sony Music France)

Marine Delplace (born 29 March 2000), known mononymously as Marine, is a French singer, songwriter and musician. In 2024, she rose to prominence for her participation in the television show Star Academy, winning season 12.

== Early life and education ==
Marine Delplace was born on 29 March 2000, in Arras, Pas-de-Calais. Passionate about music since the age of 6, she began playing the piano before moving on to the ukulele. She also dabbled in the cello. She spent part of her youth in Saint-Nicolas and studied dental surgery at University of Lille.

== Musical career ==
=== Early career (2015–2023) ===
In 2015, at the age of 14, Marine participated in season 2 of The Voice Kids by performing "Rolling in the Deep" but failed to advance past the blind auditions. At 16, on 1 October 2016, she was a finalist in the singing competition "Y'a d'la voix" at the Casino d'Arras with "a strong personality and a powerful voice." In 2022, Marine wrote and composed the song "Ma faute", which by December 2024 had been streamed over 750,000 times on Spotify and 340,000 times on YouTube. The song quickly surpassed 3 million views when she released it before the finale of season 12 of Star Academy.

=== Star Academy (2024–2025) ===
In October 2024, Marine rose to prominence by participating in season 12 of Star Academy, where she spent 15 weeks of adventure at the Château des Vives-Eaux. Like Pierre Garnier, winner of the previous edition, she reached 200,000 followers on her Instagram account a few days before the final. She won the final against Ebony Cham thanks in part to strong regional support in northern France, which gave her 65% of the public vote. This was the third-highest score for a Star Academy winner, behind Grégory Lemarchal in 2004 (80%) and Cyril Cinélu in 2006 (67%). This victory earned her a contract and a €100,000 advance to produce an album, record the album, and direct music videos with Sony Music France. During 2025, she was among the nine "academicians" of her promotion to participate in Star Academy - Tour 2025.

=== 2025–present ===
In February 2025, Marine sang "Les Corons" at halftime of the Lens-Strasbourg match at Stade Bollaert-Delelis. In March 2025, she was invited by Julien Doré to share the stage with him at his concert at the Zénith de Lille. Together, they performed the latter's song "Sublime et silence" in a piano-vocal version.

== Discography ==
=== Singles ===
List of singles, with selected chart positions, showing year released, certifications and album name
Title	Year	Peak chart positions		Certifications	Album
Title	Year	FRA	BEL (WA)	Certifications	Album
"Ma faute" (demo)	2022	—	—		Non-album single
"Ma faute"	2025	6	15	SNEP: Platinum	Cœur maladroit
"Cœur maladroit"	2025	123	17		Cœur maladroit
"Restes d'averses"	2025	—	27		Non-album singles
"Escroc"	2026	—	23		Non-album singles
"Tricheur"	2026	—	43		Non-album singles
"—" denotes a recording that did not chart or was not released in that country.
