= Viard =

Viard may refer to:

- Viard or Guido (12–13th century), the founder of the Valliscaulian Order
- André Viard (1759–1834), French culinary writer, author of Le Cuisinier Impérial, Le Cuisinier Royal, and Le Cuisinier National
- Anne-Laure Viard (born 1981), French Olympic canoer
- Jeanne Viard (born 2003), French singer
- Karin Viard (born 1966), French actress
- Philippe Viard (1809-1872) bishop, New Zealand
- Virginie Viard (born 1962), French fashion designer, creative director of Chanel
- Bishop Viard College or Viard College, a coeducational secondary school in New Zealand
- Viard (later Porirua Viard), a New Zealand association football club (–1983), now amalgamated into Western Suburbs FC
