= Duel (Morganne Matis song) =

Single by Morganne Matis

from the album Une fille de l'ere
- B-side: "All I Want Is You"
- Released: 2004-03-07 (2004-03-07)
- Recorded: 2004
- Genre: Pop rock, Rock
- Label: Universal Records
- Songwriter(s): Emmanuelle Caccamo, Nicolas Richard, Morganne Matis
- Producer(s): Frank Eulry, Sebastien Chouard

"Duel" is a song by Morganne Matis and was her first official single.

It was released in March, 2004 not long after Morganne was voted out of the French TV talent show Star Academy (France) peaking the fifth position. Duel was successful both commercially and musically peaking No.23 on French official singles charts and remaining in the top 40 for 12 weeks. It also peaked No.20 in Belgium (Wallonia) and remained in charts for 4 weeks.

It was later added to the artist's full-length album Une fille de l'ere which released in 2006.

== Chart performance ==
Chart (2004)	Peak position
Belgium (Ultratop 50 Wallonia)	20
France (SNEP)	23
