= I Got Soul =

2009 single by Young Soul Rebels

Single by Young Soul Rebels
- Released: 19 October 2009
- Recorded: 2009
- Genre: Hip hop; R&B
- Length: 3:57
- Songwriter(s): Brandon Flowers

N-Dubz singles chronology
"Wouldn't You" (2009)	"I Got Soul" (2009)	"I Need You" (2009)

Tinchy Stryder singles chronology
"Never Leave You" (2009)	"I Got Soul" (2009)	"You're Not Alone" (2009)

Pixie Lott singles chronology
"Boys and Girls" (2009)	"I Got Soul" (2009)	"Cry Me Out" (2009)

V V Brown singles chronology
"Shark in the Water" (2009)	"I Got Soul" (2009)	"Game Over" (2009)

Chipmunk singles chronology
"Oopsy Daisy" (2009)	"I Got Soul" (2009)	"In Your Shoes" (2009)

Ironik singles chronology
"Tiny Dancer (Hold Me Closer)" (2009)	"I Got Soul" (2009)	"Falling In Love" (2010)

Frankmusik singles chronology
"Confusion Girl" (2009)	"I Got Soul" (2009)	"The Fear Inside" (2010)

Kid British singles chronology
"Our House Is Dadless" (2009)	"I Got Soul" (2009)	"Winner" (2010)

MPHO singles chronology
"Box N Locks" (2009)	"I Got Soul" (2009)	"See Me Now" (2010)

Bashy singles chronology
"Your Wish Is My Command" (2009)	"I Got Soul" (2009)

McLean singles chronology
"Broken" (2007)	"I Got Soul" (2009)	"My Name" (2010)

"I Got Soul" is a 2009 charity single by charity group War Child UK, recorded by Young Soul Rebels. It was released on 19 October 2009. It is a cover of the Killers' "All These Things That I've Done". A spokesman for War Child UK said, "We're using the track, based on the hook line 'I Got Soul, But I’m Not A Soldier' to draw attention to the 300,000 children who sadly are."

== Music video ==
The music video is set in the studio where the song was recorded. It mainly features the Young Soul Rebels singing but also has clips of children in poverty, symbolizing what War Child charity is for. The cover art for the single also flashes up occasionally, as does the War Child logo.

== Young Soul Rebels ==
The Young Soul Rebels is the collective name of the artists who took part in the song:

- Ayak Thiik
- Bashy
- Chipmunk
- Domino Go
- Egypt
- Frankmusik
- Ironik
- James Lough
- Kid British
- London Community Gospel Choir
- Matt Hazell
- N-Dubz
- McLean
- MPHO
- Pixie Lott
- Tinchy Stryder
- V V Brown

== Charts ==
Chart (2009)	Peak position
Ireland (IRMA)	19
UK Singles (OCC)	10

=== Year-end charts ===
Chart (2009)	Position
UK Singles Chart	77
