= Marguerite (singer) =

French singer-songwriter (born 2000)

- Dedeyan in 2026

Background information
- Born: Marguerite Dedeyan; 3 November 2000 (age 25); Paris, France
- Genres: Pop; chanson
- Occupations: Singer; songwriter; actress
- Instrument: Vocals
- Years active: 2024–present
- Labels: Columbia; Sony Music France

Marguerite Dedeyan (born 3 November 2000), known professionally as simply Marguerite (stylized in all lower case), is a French singer, songwriter, and actress. Dedeyan rose to prominence after participating in the twelfth season of the TF1 singing competition series Star Academy (2024–2025), where she placed sixth. Dedeyan released her debut extended play Grandir in 2025, which included the single "Les filles, les meufs".

== Early life ==
Dedeyan was born on 3 November 2000 in Paris and raised in the city of Neuilly-sur-Seine in the Hauts-de-Seine department. Dedeyan is of Armenian descent and is a descendant of the princely Artsruni dynasty, with her family fleeing from İzmir to France during the Armenian genocide. She began pursuing musical theatre and acting in her childhood.

== Career ==
=== 2024–present: Star Academy, Grandir, and Guérir ===
Dedeyan began her professional career in October 2024 after appearing as a contestant in season 12 of the TF1 singing competition series Star Academy. She went on to secure a spot on the annual Star Academy nationwide tour, before being eliminated from the series in December 2024, placing sixth. In the aftermath of the competition, Dedeyan signed recording contracts with Columbia Records and Sony Music France.

Dedeyan released her debut single "Les filles, les meufs" in April 2025, which lyrically addresses her bisexuality. The song quickly became popular on TikTok, and ultimately became Dedeyan's breakout single. "Les filles, les meufs" went on to become certified platinum in France, while also becoming a top ten hit in Belgium. She went on to release her debut extended play Grandir in September 2025.

Dedeyan began her acting career after appearing in a supporting role in the film Le Mélange des genres by Michel Leclerc in April 2025.

In October 2026, Dedeyan released her debut studio album Guérir.

== Personal life ==
Dedeyan is openly bisexual, and often features queer and feminist themes in her music. Her song "Les filles, les meufs" was referred to by French LGBT magazine Têtu as a "queer anthem".

== Discography ==
=== Studio albums ===
Title	Details	Peak chart positions	
Title	Details	FRA	BEL (WA)
Guérir	Released: 2 October 2026; Label: Sony Music France; Formats: Digital download, streaming	—	—
"—" denotes a recording that did not chart or was not released in that country.

=== Extended plays ===
Title	Details	Peak chart positions	
Title	Details	FRA	BEL (WA)
Grandir	Released: 26 September 2025; Label: Sony Music France; Formats: Digital download, streaming	13	40
"—" denotes a recording that did not chart or was not released in that country.

=== Singles ===
List of singles, with selected chart positions, showing year released, certifications and album name
Title	Year	Peak chart positions		Certifications	Album
Title	Year	FRA	BEL (WA)	Certifications	Album
"Les filles, les meufs"	2025	44	6	BRMA: Gold; SNEP: Diamond	Grandir
"La maison"	2025	—	25		Grandir
"La boss"	2026	—	—		Guérir
"Bellevie"	2026	—	3		Guérir
"Cartable"	2026	—	—		Guérir
"Un peu beaucoup"	2026	—	—		Guérir
"—" denotes a recording that did not chart or was not released in that country.
