= Ebony Cham =

French singer (born 2004)

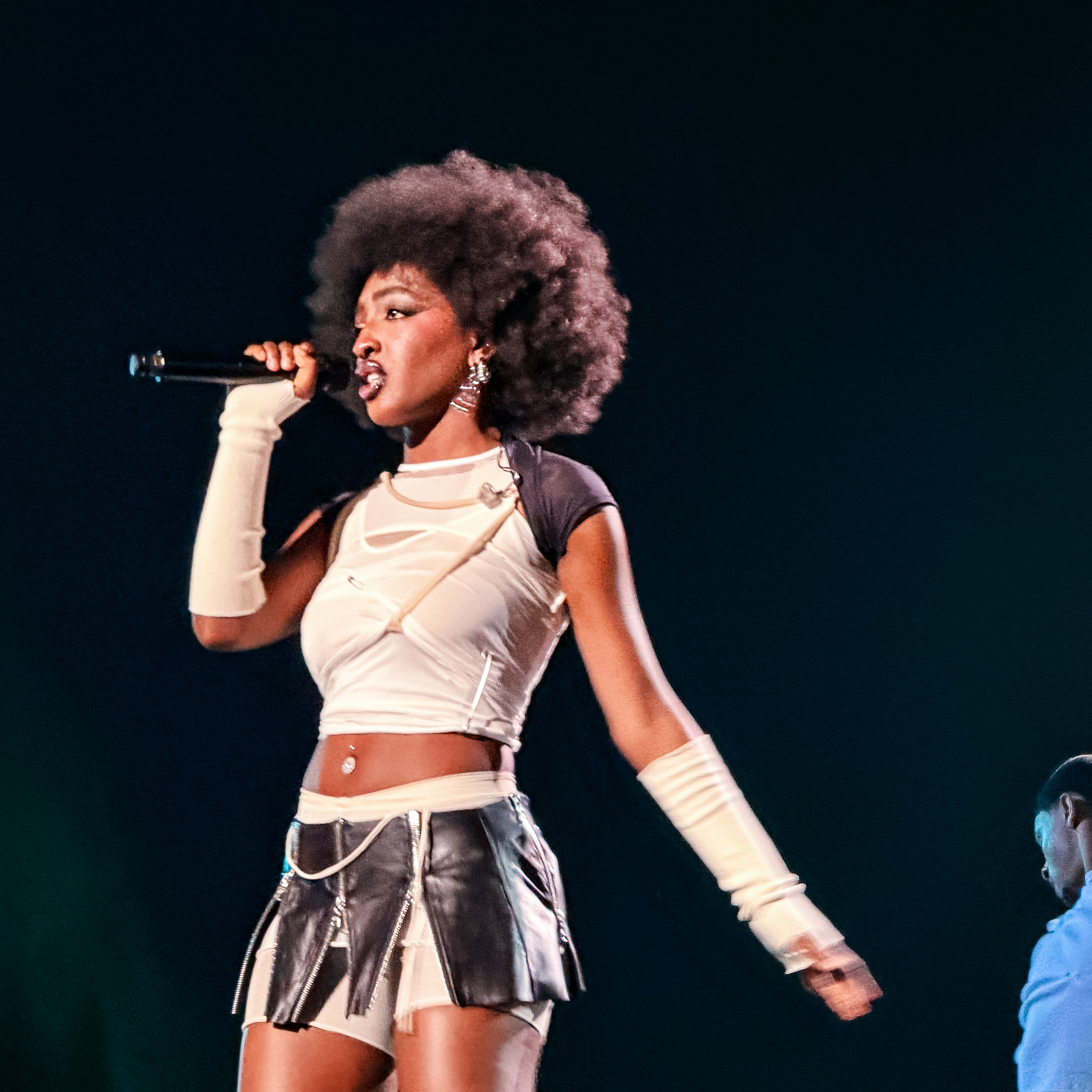
- Cham in 2026
- Born: Ebony Makeda Queen Sheba Mélanie Cham; October 15, 2004 (age 22)
- Occupations: Singer; songwriter
- Years active: 2024–present
- Father: Thierry Cham
- Musical career
- Genre: Pop
- Instrument: Vocals

Ebony Cham (born October 15, 2004), commonly referred to as Ebony, is a French singer.

In 2025, she was a finalist in the musical program Star Academy 12, broadcast on TF1.

== Early life ==
With parents from Guadeloupe and Martinique, Ebony Cham was born on October 15, 2004.

Her father is Thierry Cham, a famous zouk singer from the 2000s.

She began playing guitar and piano at an early age, and took music theory lessons. Before joining Star Academy, Ebony was studying musicology and preparing to join a jazz school.

== Career ==
In 2023, she signed up for Star Academy season 11, but was not selected. In 2024, she tried again and was selected as one of the 15 candidates for season 12.

On December 21, 2024, Tayc offered to sign her to his record label at the end of the season. In February 2025, she ended-up signing with Epic Records.

In January 2025, she released her first single "Unforgettable", composed by Dany Synthé.

In April 2025, she became Dyson France's muse along Noholita, Andie Ella, Chloë Gervais and Chloé Bleinc, forming Beauty Squad 2025.

== Discography ==
=== Albums ===
Title	Album details	Peak chart positions			Certifications
Title	Album details	FRA	BEL (WA)	SWI	Certifications
Menelik	Released: 24 April 2026; Labels: Epic Records France	70	—	—	—

=== EP ===
- 2026 : KILL BILL

=== Singles ===
==== As lead artist ====
List of singles as lead artist, with selected chart positions and certifications, showing year released and album name
Title	Year	Peak chart positions			Certifications	Album
Title	Year	FRA	BEL (Wa)	BEL (Fl)	Certifications	Album
"Unforgettable"	2025	70	—	—	—	L'album de la promo 2024
"RAGE"	2025	—	—	—	—	MENELIK
"MON PARADIS"	2026	—	—	—	—	MENELIK
"KILL BILL"	2026	—	—	—	—	MENELIK
"RÊVES D'ENFANT"	2026	—	—	—		MENELIK
"—" denotes a recording that did not chart or was not released in that territory.

==== As featured artist ====
Single	Year	Peak positions			Certifications	Album
Single	Year	FRA	BEL (Fl)	BEL (Wa)	Certifications	Album
"Je t'aimais, je t'aime, je t'aimerais" (Star Academy featuring Charles, Ebony, Emma & Marine)	2025	—	—	—	—	L'album de la promo 2024
"La vie en rose" (Star Academy featuring Ebony & Paul)	2025	—	—	—	—	L'album de la promo 2024
"—" denotes a recording that did not chart or was not released in that territory.

== Filmography ==
- 2024 - 2025 : Star Academy (season 12)

== Concert tour ==
- 2025 : Star Academy Tour
- 2026 : Conception Tour
- 2026 : Menelik Tour
