= Louis Gibzen =

- Born: 28 July 1991 (age 33)
- Origin: Middleton, Greater Manchester, England
- Genres: Hip hop, R&B, synthpop, dance
- Occupation(s): Producer, songwriter
- Years active: 2006–present

Louis Gibzen (born Louis Gibson Hurndall), is a British hip-hop/electro record producer of Barbadian descent. He was raised in Middleton, Greater Manchester, and is known as a promising upcoming producer throughout the UK. He produced the record "Stay with Me" for Ironik's debut album.

The record hit No. 5 on the UK Singles Chart whilst Gibzen was just 16. Since then, he has worked with various UK artists such as Sway, Chipmunk, Loick Essien, Wiley and on Wretch 32's upcoming album. Gibzen also produced Fugative's single "Sticks And Stones" with Anthony Anderson & Steve Smith. He has recently produced for USA based artists such as Akon, Wiz Khalifa, Nicole Scherzinger, The Weeknd & Lana Del Rey

Gibzen has made various instrumentals for American dance crew Jabbawockeez; one being titled "Forever".

He also has his own production company and music site. In 2012, Gibzen revealed that he and his label are releasing a Champagne in partnership with footballer Mario Balotelli called LF Champagne.

Gibzen's productions were used for the E4 show Youngers.

He was part of the Goodbye Tomorrow project and released a concept album in 2015 entitled 'A Journey Through The Mind Of A Non Believer' via Rostrum Records.

== Notable production credits ==
- "Stay With Me" (DJ Ironik)
- "Introvert Me" (Pyrelli)
- "Man of the Match" (Sway DaSafo)
- "End Of The Road" (Sway DaSafo)
- "Sticks & Stones (production & songwriting)" (Fugative)
- "For The Money" (Ya Boy)
- "Lose My Life" (Chipmunk)
- "Cliche" (Loick Essien)
- "Get It Tonight" (Loick Essien)
- "Life's Just A Playground" (Mims)
- "Wait & See" (Smiler)
- "Spender" (Smiler feat. Lana Del Rey)
- "Exist" (Nicole Scherzinger)
- "I'm Dreaming" (Wretch 32)
- "Us Against The World" (Clement Marfo & The Frontline)
- "Overload (songwriting)" (Dot Rotten)
- "Sing For Tomorrow (piano)" (Sneakbo)
- "Another Night Alone" (K'Naan)
- "Enemy" (The Weeknd)
- "I Don't Want It (co-production & songwriting)" (Akon)
- "Rock Bottom (co-production)" (Zak Abel)
