= Anne Tilloy =

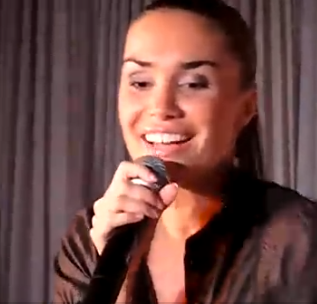
- During a showcase (2006)

Background information
- Born: Paris, France
- Origin: France

Anne Tilloy (born 12 September 1980) is a French actress - and singer - specialized in the french dubbing industry born in Paris. She is the french voice for several TV-series characters. She is the voice for Fiona Gallagher (Emmy Rossum) in Shameless, Nora Clayton (Daniella Alonso) in Revolution, for Laurel Lance / Black Canary (Katie Cassidy) in Arrow and for Chris Alonso (Lina Esco) in S.W.A.T.

== Biography ==
Anne Tilloy was born on 12 September 1980 in Paris. She began dancing at the age of five years. Following a singing competition, where she won first place, she decided to study in a music school. At the age of 13 she attends and studies in the famous studios of Alice Dona where she learns singing, dancing, writing and acting. She also learns playing the piano and drums. In 1995 she released her first single, which was a cover of Jean Jacques Goldman's song "Minoritaire". On several occasions she performed live. Soon she becomes the opening act for artists like Dave and Émile et Images. She also sang live at half-time for the 1998 Rugby World Cup. She took part in more than 500 concerts in France and abroad.

== Music ==
=== Star Academy 3 ===
Under the pseudonym Morganne Matis, she qualified through the auditions and joined the third edition of the extremely popular French TV talent show Star Academy (France) in 2003. There she performs live with numerous big acts as of the likes of Elton John, Lara Fabian, Julio Iglesias, Julien Clerc, Johnny Hallyday with whom they perform live his song "Je te promets" and Shaggy singing live together his hit "It Wasn't Me" and "Hey Sexy Lady".

She won fifth place in the semi-final. Matis was now known to the French public since ten million viewers per average watched Star Academy 3 live every Sunday night. Later she tours all over France with all her fellow finalists of Star Academy 3 with commercial success as tickets were out-sold.

=== Discography ===
Straight after her departure from the show releases her first single "Duel" with Universal a rock mid-tempo song, which made it to the Top 23 on the French charts. It also reached number 20 on the Belgian Ultratop (Wallonia) chart. However Universal Music later did not sign a contract for a full album with her and the collaboration is over.

Morganne finally releases her first album Une Fille de l’ère in 2006 with her own production company "Duel Prod" and only available in her official website and some other download sites. The album is influenced by rock french music and has 15 tracks a lot of up-tempo, and a few ballads.

- Album

Title	Details
Une Fille de l’ère	Released: 2006; Label: Self-released

- Single: "Duel" (2004)

== Dubbing ==
She is active, under her civil name - Anne Tilloy -, in the french dubbing industry since 2008. Some of her main characters are:

- Fiona Gallagher (Emmy Rossum) in Shameless (US),
- Nora Clayton (Daniella Alonso) in Revolution
- Dinah "Laurel" Lance (Katie Cassidy) in Arrow
- Elizabeth of York (Freya Mavor) in The White Queen

== See also ==
- Star Academy France
