= Mario Barravecchia =

- Born: Mario Barravecchia; 16 November 1976 (age 50); Liège Province, Belgium
- Genre: Pop
- Occupation: Singer
- Years active: 2002–2010
- Label: Universal

Mario Barravecchia (born 16 November 1976), or simply Mario, is an Italian who was the finalist of the first edition of French TV reality show Star Academy. His first single "On se ressemble", was a hit in France and Belgium.

== Discography ==
=== Albums ===
- 2002 : Mario Barravecchia – #12 in Belgium, #70 in France
- 2009 : Intimo

=== Singles ===
- 2002 : "On se ressemble" (released under the name Mario) – #1 in Belgium, #6 in France
- 2003 : "De tes propres ailes" – #65 in France
- 2003 : "(Dimmi) Cosa ne sai" (duet with Lydia Castorina) – #46 in France
- 2004 : "Una storia importante" – #51 in France
