= I Wanna Be Your Man (Ironik song) =

Single by Ironik

from the album No Point in Wasting Tears
- Released: 29 August 2008 (digital download); 30 August 2008 (physical)
- Recorded: 2008
- Genre: R&B, grime
- Length: 2:58
- Label: Asylum, Warner Music
- Songwriter(s): James Charters
- Producer(s): Agent X

Ironik singles chronology
"Stay with Me" (2008)	"I Wanna Be Your Man" (2008)	"Tiny Dancer (Hold Me Closer)" (2009)

"I Wanna Be Your Man" is the second single from Ironik's debut album No Point in Wasting Tears. The song samples the 1987 song "I Want to Be Your Man" by funk/R&B artist Roger . The song peaked at No. 35 on the official UK Singles Chart.

== Music video ==
The video features Ironik in different scenes through Paris where he is in the studio recording this track. It also features him driving in a car looking for the girl of his dreams.

== Track listing ==
UK CD single

1. "I Wanna Be Your Man" - original version

UK Maxi-single

1. "I Wanna Be Your Man" - radio edit
2. "I Wanna Be Your Man" - Tinchy Stryder/Ghetto remix

== Chart performance ==
Chart (2008)	Peak position
UK Singles (OCC)	35
