= Winner (Kid British song) =

Single by Kid British

from the album To Get Nowhere, Follow the Crowd
- Released: 28 June 2010
- Recorded: 2010
- Genre: Ska, indie
- Label: Mercury Records
- Songwriters: Sean Mbaya, James Mayer, Adio Marchant & Simeon Mclean

Kid British singles chronology
"I Got Soul" (2009)	"Winner" (2010)

"Winner" is the fourth single by British ska/indie band Kid British, released on 28 June 2010. It was released to coincide with the 2010 World Cup, and featured on their debut album To Get Nowhere, Follow the Crowd.

The video for the single features former West Ham United and England forward Geoff Hurst and Manchester City defender Nedum Onuoha.

The song also features on the 2010 FIFA World Cup South Africa video game.

== Track listing ==
1. "Winner"
2. "Let's Av a Party"
