= Georges-Alain Jones =

French singer (born 1975)

- Born: Georges-Alain Jones; 30 September 1975 (age 50)
- Origin: Saint-Jean-Cap-Ferrat, France
- Genres: Pop
- Occupations: Commentator, former singer
- Years active: 2003–2005
- Label: Mercury

Georges-Alain Jones (30 September 1975, Saint-Jean-Cap-Ferrat, Alpes-Maritimes) is a French former singer. He participated in the second edition of French TV reality show Star Academy. His debut single "Embrasse" was a top ten hit in France and Belgium (Wallonia).

== Discography ==
=== Albums ===
- 2005 : New Jersey - #75 in Belgium, #31 in France

=== Singles ===
- 2003 : "Embrasse" - #4 in Belgium, #6 in France, #26 in Switzerland
- 2003 : "Vivre en danger" - #40 in Belgium, #55 in France
- 2005 : "Central Park" - #36 in France
