= Jérémy Amelin =

French recording artist

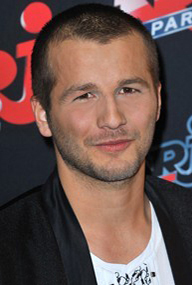
- Amelin at the NRJ12 anniversary party (2009)
- Born: Jérémy Amelin; 1 July 1986 (age 40); Montargis, France
- Occupation: Singer
- Years active: 2005–present
- Musical career
- Genres: Pop; dance; electropop
- Instrument: Vocals
- Label: Mercury Records (2005–2006)

Jérémy Amelin (born 1 July 1986) is a French recording artist. Best known as finalist of French music TV show Star Academy 5.

== Biography ==
Amelin was born on 1 July 1986 in Montargis, France, and raised in Montcresson, France.

He was the finalist of French music TV show Star Academy 5, and released three singles.

Amelin appeared as Captain Phoebus in the 10-year anniversary tour of musical Notre Dame de Paris in Seoul, South Korea.

Jeremy Amelin has performed several notable roles in the world of musical theater. In 2023, he portrayed the role of Phoebus in New York at the Lincoln Center on Broadway in the production of *Notre-Dame de Paris*.

In 2018, he also played Billy in the musical adaptation of the cult film *Dirty Dancing*.

Since 2018, Jeremy Ameline has been working for the Royal Palace of Kirrwiller in Alsace, the second-largest cabaret in France and Europe. He was the singer for the revues *Flamboyant* and *Treasure*.

Since 2021, he has been the director of the revues *Frenzies* and *Great Love*, each attracting over 200,000 people.

== Discography ==
Jérémy Amelin discography
- Singles: 3
- Music videos: 1

=== Singles ===
Year	Title	Peak chart positions		
Year	Title	FRA	BEL	CHE
2006	À Contre Sens	13	17	81
2010	Oh, Oh ! (feat. Angelika)	—	—	-
2011	Undone (feat. Jessica Lowndes)	—	—	—

=== Music videos ===
Year	Title	Director
2010	Oh, Oh ! (feat. Angelika)	Kayden Boche
