= Falling in Love (Ironik song) =

Single by Ironik featuring Jessica Lowndes
- Released: 24 October 2010
- Recorded: 2010
- Genre: Hip hop, rap, pop
- Length: 3:38
- Label: BPM Entertainment
- Songwriter(s): James Christian Charters
- Producer(s): Teddy Music

Ironik singles chronology
"I Got Soul" (2009)	"Falling in Love" (2010)	"Killed Me" (2011)

Jessica Lowndes singles chronology
"Falling in Love" (2010)	"Undone" (2011)

"Falling in Love" is the fourth official single by British hip hop artist Ironik, featuring vocals from Canadian actress and singer Jessica Lowndes. It was the first single from Ironik's second album which was never released. The single was released on 24 October 2010 for digital download. It charted at number 40 on the UK Singles Chart on 31 October 2010.

== Track listing ==
Digital download
No.	Title	Length
1.	"Falling in Love" (Jackstar Radio Mix)	3:38
2.	"Falling in Love" (Crazy Cousinz Daytime Mix)	3:11
3.	"Falling in Love" (Crazy Cousinz Nighttime Mix)	3:33
4.	"Falling in Love" (Riffs and Rays Radio Edit)	3:42
5.	"Falling In Love" (Riffs and Rays Club Mix Edit)	8:10
6.	"Falling in Love" (UATM Russkaya Ruletka Mix)	6:42
7.	"Falling in Love" (Teddy's Grimey Remix)	4:18
Total length:		31:53

== Chart performance ==
The song charted at number 40 on the UK Singles Chart on October 31, 2010.

Chart (2010)	Peak position
UK Singles (OCC)	40
Scotland (OCC)	40

== Release history ==
Region	Date	Format	Label
United Kingdom	24 October 2010	Digital Download	BPM Entertainment
