= Houcine Camara =

French singer

Houcine
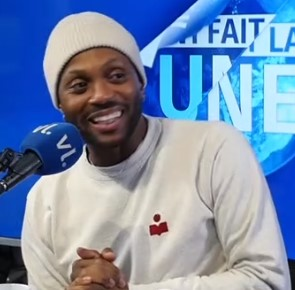

Background information
- Born: Houcine Camara; 19 August 1980 (age 46)
- Origin: Nancy, France
- Genres: Pop
- Occupation: Singer
- Years active: 2003–present
- Label: Mercury

Houcine Camara or just Houcine (born 19 August 1980), is a French singer.

== Biography ==
He was born in a musical family. His father was a singer, who for 10 years had also directed "Le palais des danses africaines de Nancy". His mother was an artist designer of oriental fashion. At 6, he studied at the Nancy Conservatory where he learned to play the piano and violin. He also practiced sports, notably soccer. At 15, he composed music on the piano and at 16 formed a groove band with his brother and performed at various public occasions.

Houcine auditioned for second edition of French TV reality show Star Academy where he was a finalist.

His first single, "Être un homme comme vous" was used on the soundtrack of the movie The Jungle Book 2, and became a successful record in France, Belgium-Wallonia, and Switzerland, where it became a top ten hit. Houcine has two sons, Lenny and Noah.

== Discography ==
=== Singles ===
- 2003 : "Être un homme comme vous" – #3 in Belgium, #6 in France, #9 in Switzerland
- 2003 : "Ce que tu veux de moi" – #72 in France
- 2004 : "Donne-moi du temps" – #64 in France
