= Jessica Lowndes =

Canadian actress and singer

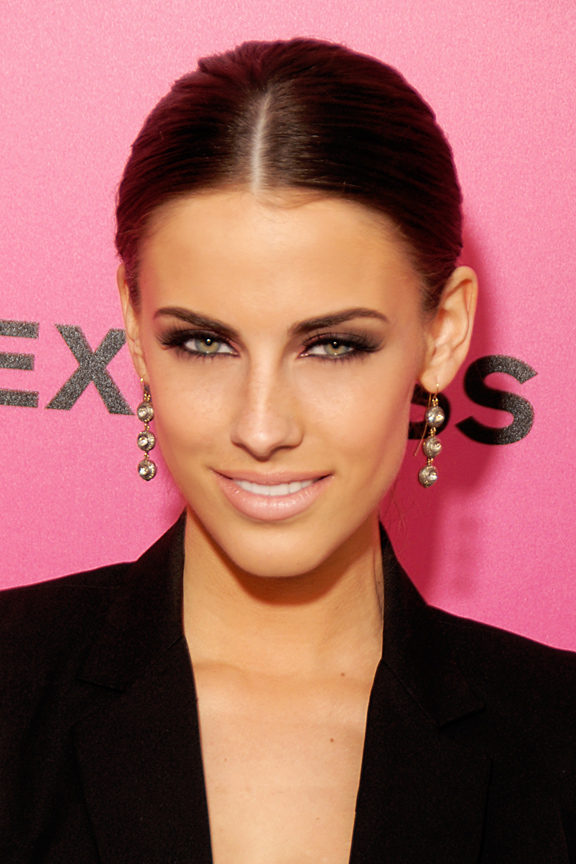
- Lowndes in 2009
- Born: Jessica Suzanne Lowndes; November 8, 1988 (age 38); Vancouver, Canada
- Occupations: Actress, singer
- Years active: 2005–present
- Musical career
- Genres: Pop; electropop; dance
- Instrument: Vocals
- Labels: CBS; Aperture
- Website: jessicalowndes.com

Jessica Suzanne Lowndes (/laʊndz/; born November 8, 1988) is a Canadian actress and singer. She is best known for her role as Adrianna Tate-Duncan on The CW teen drama series 90210.

== Early life ==
Lowndes was born in 1988 in Vancouver, British Columbia, and attended private Pacific Academy in Surrey. She is the daughter of Dan Lowndes and wife Suzanne Timm, a piano teacher, has a younger sister named Jacqueline Danielle Lowndes, and is of English, Scottish, and Irish descent.

Lowndes has stated that she knew from an early age that she had a passion for singing and acting. Lowndes also produced much of her own music from an early age. During the summer before her senior year of high school, Lowndes worked on a project for Showtime. With encouragement from her parents, Lowndes moved to Los Angeles at the age of 16 and began her career.

== Career ==
=== Acting ===
Lowndes made her acting debut at age 16 in the 2005 television film Saving Milly as Andrea Kondracke. This was followed by a guest role on an episode of Masters of Horror; she was later cast as Becky, a recurring role in the sitcom Alice, I Think. She also made a guest appearance on Kyle XY. Her next film role was a supporting role in the Lifetime movie To Have and to Hold released in 2005, followed by a pilot called Pretty/Handsome in 2007—which did not get picked up.

In 2008, Lowndes appeared in Autopsy and The Haunting of Molly Hartley along with another recurring role, this time as Mandi, in the television drama series Greek.

She also landed a recurring role as Adrianna Tate-Duncan in the series 90210, a spin-off of the '90s teen drama series Beverly Hills, 90210. Originally intended to be a guest spot for the pilot episode, her performance proved to be so effective that she was upgraded to a series regular almost immediately. She would appear throughout the show's entire 5 season run.

Lowndes starred in the Canadian horror film Altitude in 2010. BuddyTV ranked her #58 on its TV's 100 Sexiest Women of 2011 list. In April 2012, she starred in Darren Lynn Bousman's The Devil's Carnival, a horror musical film screened on tour. She also starred in Lionsgate's 2014 action film The Prince, alongside Bruce Willis and John Cusack.

In 2015, Lowndes starred in Lifetime's dramatic-thriller comedy film A Deadly Adoption, alongside Will Ferrell and Kristen Wiig. In 2016, she starred in Hallmark's A December Bride with Daniel Lissing and would go on to become a Hallmark Channel regular, appearing in a dozen made-for-television films for the network.

In 2022, she signed with Great American Family and began appearing in films for the Hallmark Channel competitor. She would return to Hallmark at the tail end of the 2024 Christmas season.

=== Singing ===
Lowndes made her musical debut in the pilot episode of TV series 90210 singing "Mama Who Bore Me" from Spring Awakening in the school's musical, in the 2009 episode "Women's Intuition". In the 90210 episode "What's Past is Prologue", Lowndes sang "Jolene" for a rock band audition. She also sang a few other songs as the lead female vocalist on 90210's "The Glorious Steinem"'s band.

Lowndes also performed One More Time (feat. Diego Boneta) in the 90210 episode "Meet the Parent". During season 4 of 90210, her single "Fool" was featured and sung by her character in the episode "Benefit of the Doubt". In the episode "Bride And Prejudice", her song "Teardrops Fall" was featured. "I Don't Want You Anymore" was featured in the episode "Tis Pity". During season 5, her next single "Snake Charmer" was featured in the episode "Into The Wild" and sung by her in "99 Problems". In the penultimate episode, her song "The Last Time" was sung by her character. Just as she finishes, the stage collapses on her, catches on fire and leaving her trapped under rubble.

In March 2009, she released the song Fly Away on Myspace. She was both the writer, singer and lead guitarist in the track. On September 19, 2009, Lowndes performed God Bless America for a Dodgers game at the Dodger Stadium in Los Angeles, California.

She was featured on British rapper Ironik's single "Falling In Love", released on October 24, 2010, and revealed on OK! TV that she was finishing off her debut EP in the United Kingdom. She described the album as "sexy, pop dance music, like Rihanna and Katy Perry."

Lowndes later collaborated with music producers James Rendon and Kayden Boche to record a featuring version of French American Idol finalist Jérémy Amelin's single "Undone" — which premiered online on May 6, 2011 and was released worldwide on May 23, 2011.

On October 11, 2011, CBS Records released her debut single "Fool" on iTunes. Shortly afterwards, Lowndes released her follow-up single "I Wish I Was Gay", alongside its official music video directed by Frank E. Flowers, on November 11, 2011. On January 25, 2012, Lowndes released her debut EP—featuring singles I Wish I Was Gay and Nothing Like This, along with two new songs Stamp of Love and Go Back.

The Devil's Carnival soundtrack also features a song titled In All My Dreams I Drown performed by Lowndes and released on April 3, 2012.

On May 14, 2012, her single The Other Girl premiered on Complex.com. The single was released on iTunes on May 16, 2012. On February 6, 2013, Lowndes announced that she would release her self-written second EP titled TBT (Throwback Thursday) on March 14, 2013, along with one track off it every Thursdays for four weeks. On February 7, 2013, Aperture Entertainment released Fly Away as the lead single from her EP.

On September 9, 2014, Lowndes released her single Silicone in Stereo. The official music video premiered on September 6, 2014, both on YouTube and Vevo. The song peaked at number 35 on Billboard Canada's Top 50 and number 65 on the US Top 100.

Lowndes was included on People magazine's list of World's Most Beautiful People of 2009, along with co-stars from the series 90210.

== Filmography ==
=== Film ===
Year	Title	Role	Notes
2008	Autopsy	Emily Hosfield	
2008	The Haunting of Molly Hartley	Laurel Miller	
2010	Altitude	Sara	
2012	Garden of Eden	Kristin	Short film
2012	The Devil's Carnival	Tamara	
2014	The Prince	Angela	
2015	Eden	Elena	
2015	Larry Gaye: Renegade Male Flight Attendant	Suzanne	
2016	Abattoir	Julia	
2021	Colour of Love	Taylor	

=== Television ===
Year	Title	Role	Notes
2005	Masters of Horror	Peggy	Episode: "Dance of the Dead"
2005	Saving Milly	Andrea Kondracke (age 15)	Television film
2006	Alice, I Think	Becky	2 episodes
2006	To Have and to Hold	Lisa	Television film
2006	Kyle XY	Eve	Episode: "Memory Serves"
2008	Pretty/Handsome	Cassie Booth	Unsold FX pilot
2008	Greek	Mandi	6 episodes
2008	Chinese Guys	Christy	Episode: "Reason to Fight"
2008–2013	90210	Adrianna Tate-Duncan	Main cast, 114 episodes
2009	America's Next Top Model	Herself	Episode: "Interview 101"
2012	A Mother's Nightmare	Vanessa Redlynn	Television film
2014	Young and Hungry	Judy Green	Episode: "Young & Lesbian"
2015	Hawaii Five-0	Emma Mills	Episode: "Kuka'awale (Stakeout)"
2015	Motive	London Montgomery	Episode: "6 Months Later"
2015	A Deadly Adoption	Bridgette Gibson / Joni Mathers	Television film
2015	Merry Matrimony	Brie Traverston	Hallmark Movie
2016	A December Bride	Layla O'Reilly	Hallmark Movie
2016	Dirk Gently's Holistic Detective Agency	Modern Jake Rainey/Jake Rainey	Episodes: "Rogue Wall Enthusiasts", "Weaponized Soul"
2017	Magical Christmas Ornaments	Marie	Television film
2018	A Father's Nightmare	Vanessa Redlynn	Television film
2017	Major Crimes	Alex Snow	2 episodes
2018	Christmas at Pemberley Manor	Elizabeth Bennett	Hallmark Movie
2018	Yes, I Do	Nicole Sweeney	Television film
2019	Over the Moon in Love	Brooklyn Moore	Television film
2019	Rediscovering Christmas	Mia	Television film
2020	Too Close for Christmas	Hayley Parker	Television film
2021	Mix Up in the Mediterranean	Meg Wescott	Television film
2021	Colors of Love/An Autumn Romance	Taylor	Television film
2021	Angel Falls Christmas	Ally	Television film
2021	High Flying Romance/Kite Festival of Romance	Hannah Adams	Television film
2022	Harmony from the Heart	Violet	Television film
2022	I'm Glad It's Christmas	Chloe	Television film
2023	An Autumn Gathering/A Harvest Homecoming	Lainie Abbott	Television film
2023	Deadly Midwife	Lauren	Television film
2024	A Stranger's Child	Donna Fendyr	Television film
2024	Happy Howlidays	Mia	Hallmark Movie
2026	Christmas Under Construction	Chelsea	Hallmark Movie

== Discography ==
=== Extended plays ===
- Nothing Like This (2012)
- TBT (Throwback Thursday) (2013)

=== Albums ===
- Elemental (2022)
- 88 (2024)

=== Singles ===
Title	Year	Album
"Fool"	2011	90210 (soundtrack from the 4th season)
"Nothing Like This"	2012	Nothing Like This
"I Wish I Was Gay"	2012	Nothing Like This
"The Other Girl"	2012	Non album single
"I Don't Want You Anymore"	2012	90210 (soundtrack from the 4th season)
"Teardrops Fall"	2012	90210 (soundtrack from the 4th season)
"Snake Charmer"	2012	90210 (soundtrack from the 5th season)
"Fly Away"	2013	TBT (Throwback Thursday)
"Goodbye"	2013	TBT (Throwback Thursday)
"Break"	2013	TBT (Throwback Thursday)
"Never Lonely"	2013	TBT (Throwback Thursday)
"The Last Time"	2013	90210 (soundtrack from the 5th season)
"Silicone in Stereo"	2014	Non album singles
"Deja Vu"	2015	Non album singles
"Underneath The Mask"	2016	Non album singles
"Paradise" (with Wes Brown)	2019	Non album single (featured on Hallmark Channel movie Over the Moon in Love)

==== As featured artist ====
Title	Year	Peak chart positions		Album
Title	Year	SCO	UK	Album
"Falling in Love" (Ironik featuring Jessica Lowndes)	2010	40	40	—
"Undone" (Jérémy Amelin featuring Jessica Lowndes)	2011	—	—	—

=== Other appearances ===
Title	Year	Other artist(s)	Album
"In All My Dreams I Drown"	2012	Terrance Zdunich	The Devil's Carnival

=== Music videos ===
Year	Artist	Title
2010	Ironik featuring Jessica Lowndes	"Falling in Love"
2011	Herself	"I Wish I Was Gay"
2012	Herself	"Nothing Like This"
2014	Herself	"Silicone In Stereo"
2015	Herself	"Deja Vu"

== Awards ==
- 2014: Nominated at the Canadian Screen Awards for her performance in A Mother's Nightmare.
- 2009: Nominated at the Prism Awards for her performance in 90210.
