= Our House Is Dadless =

Single by Kid British

from the album It Was This or Football
- Released: 4 July 2009
- Recorded: 2009
- Genre: Ska, indie
- Label: Mercury Records
- Songwriter(s): Sean Mbaya, James Mayer, Adio Marchant, Simeon Mclean, Cathal Smyth, Chris Foreman

Kid British singles chronology
"Sunny Days" (2009)	"Our House Is Dadless" (2009)	"I Got Soul" (2009)

"Our House Is Dadless" is the third single by British ska/indie band Kid British. It was released on 4 July 2009 on digital download and entered the UK Singles Chart at #63.

The song samples "Our House" by British ska band Madness.

== Track listing ==
1. "Our House Is Dadless"
2. "Our House Is Dadless" (Bimbo Jones Remix)
