= My Name (song) =

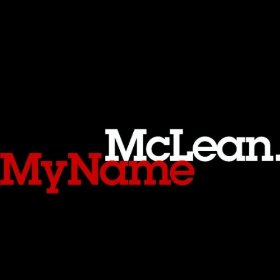

Single by McLean

from the album Finally in Love
- Released: 5 March 2010 (digital download); 8 March 2010 (CD single)
- Genre: R&B
- Length: 3:22 (album version)
- Label: Asylum
- Songwriter: Anthony McLean James McDowell
- Producers: Slick and Magic

McLean singles chronology
"I Got Soul" (2009)	"My Name" (2010)	"Finally in Love" (2010)

Music video
- "My Name" on YouTube

"My Name" is a song by British singer McLean. It was released on 8 March 2010 on CD and 5 March 2010 on digital download. The track has been remixed by many other British artists. It is thought that the producer of the song is Fraser T Smith, but was also originally produced by Slick and Magic in London. "My Name" peaked at number ten on the UK Singles Chart. The song was completed in Los Angeles by Dylan "3D" Dresdow, the mix engineer that also mixed The Black Eyed Peas hit singles off their latest album, The E.N.D.. Singer Iyaz produced a song named 'So Big' that has the same melody.

== Reception ==
BBC chart blog's Fraser McAlpine gave a fair review for the song:

I don't know how the people who made this record ever got through it. I mean I've some idea of how you record a song, and usually it requires several million listens to the same three minutes, adding bits, taking bits away, polishing, until it's finally perfect. I only have to review the thing and by my tally I've clocked up over three hours on the one song so far (not all of it continuous).

And, to be honest, the strain is starting to show. The same four chords around and around, the different spiralling melodies, the chuntery synth...well all I can say is that some songs are built for repetition and some are not. One more play of this and I am going POSTAL.

Interesting how they really layer on that autotune at the crucial moment, the bit where he claims to want to give you, the most important person in his life and therefore his most precious love, his name. I wonder if that's so the song can't be considered to be legally binding, should McLean's actual girlfriend sue him for non-delivery of ring and promise in the event of his becoming famous with a song in which he promises to marry her.

It was awarded a 3 star rating by Fraser McAlphine.

== Music video ==
The music video for My Name features a girl attempting a jewellery heist. The alarm sounds as she breaks a laser beam and she is seemingly caught and interrogated. McLean is seen singing in the interrogation chair and it conspires that the girl is not really in custody, instead there is a hologram in her place. McLean and the girl escape together.

== Remixes ==
The track has been remixed by artists such as Scorcher and Boy Better Know, which are both official remixes. Each remix has McLean's original verses, but Boy Better Know's remix is sped up a little and includes another verse. On iTunes, there are other remixes such as the Ian Carey Remix and Attacca Pesante Remix.

== Track listing ==
- Digital downlo
- ad
1. " Akshay Chauhan
2. "My Name" (Ian Carey Remix) – 5:33
3. "My Name" (Blame Dub) – 5:18
4. "My Name" (Attacca Pestane Remix) – 2:59
- Remixes single" (Scorcher Remix) - 3:53
- "Mr Shashank singh
- (Desi Jags Klimax Remix) - 3:27
- CD Single
1. "My Name" (Album version) - 3:22

== Chart performance ==
On 10 March 2010, "My Name" was estimated to have reached No. 11 according to midweek sales figures. On 14 March 2010 "My Name" reached No. 10 on the UK Singles Chart, marking McLean's first Top 10 hit. It spent five weeks in the UK Singles Chart.

== Charts ==
=== Weekly charts ===
Chart (2010)	Peak position
Scotland Singles (OCC)	15
UK Singles (OCC)	10
UK Hip Hop/R&B (OCC)	5

=== Year-end charts ===
Chart (2010)	Position
UK Singles (OCC)	163

== Certifications ==
Certifications for "My Name"
Region	Certification	Certified units/sales
United Kingdom (BPI)	Silver	200,000^{‡}
^{‡} Sales+streaming figures based on certification alone.
