= Ambre (singer) =

French singer-songwriter (born 2007)

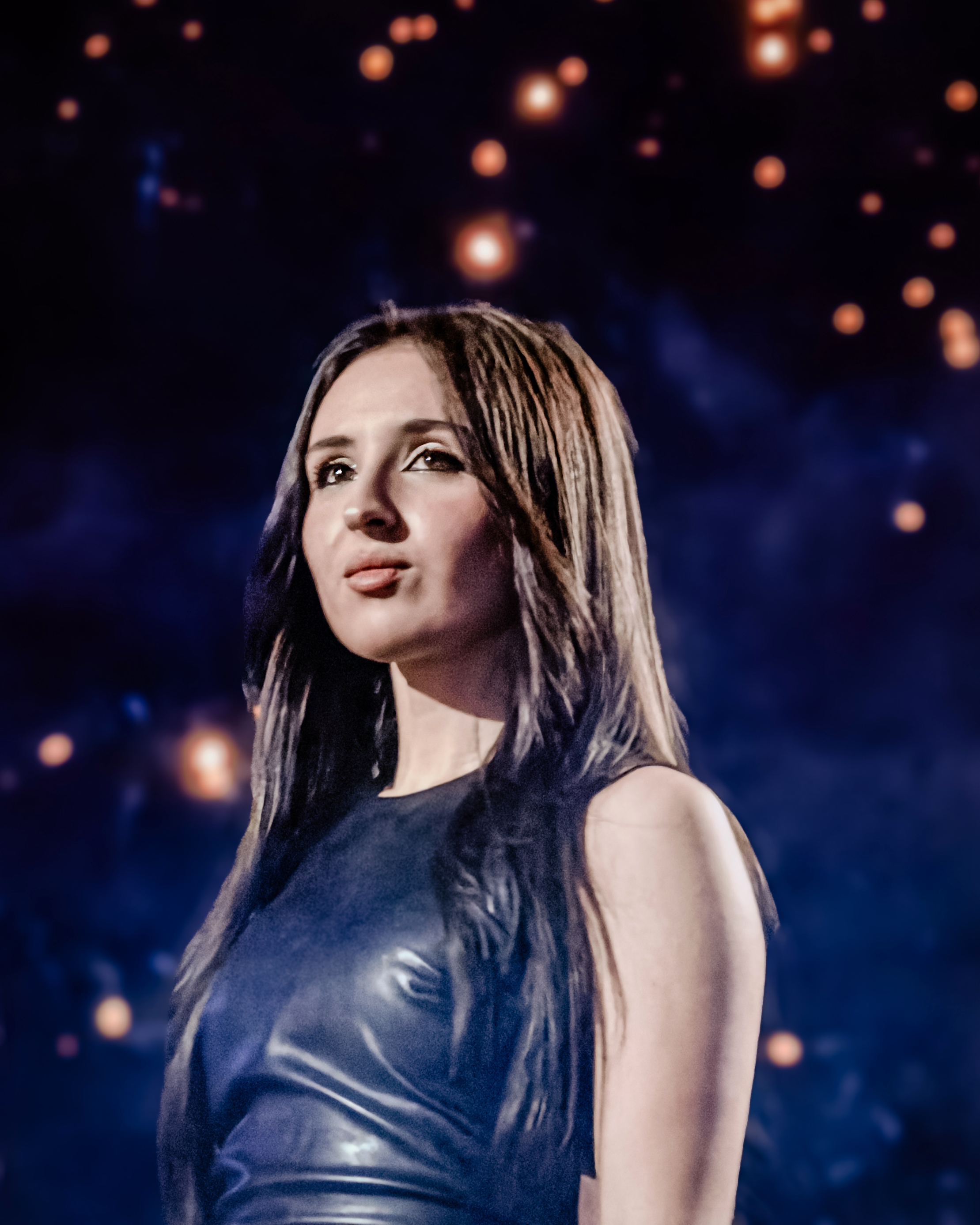
- Jadah in 2026

Background information
- Also known as: Amber Jadah; Ambre Jadah
- Born: Ambre Berger; 29 March 2007 (age 19); Paris, France
- Genres: Pop; chanson
- Occupations: Singer; actress
- Instrument: Vocals
- Years active: 2025–present
- Labels: RCA; Sony Music France

Ambre Berger (born 29 March 2007), sometimes known as Ambre Jadah or Amber Jadah, is a French singer and actress. Berger rose to prominence after winning the thirteenth season of the TF1 singing competition series Star Academy (2025–2026).

== Early life and education ==
Berger was born on 29 March 2007 in Paris and raised by her mother Nabila Belaidouni and stepfather Quentin Bourru. Her mother is a lawyer specializing in corporate law and tax law, while her stepfather is a business executive and director of vacation clubs. Berger is estranged from her biological father and he was not present during her childhood or adolescence. Through her mother, she has Algerian heritage.

Berger spent her upbringing between Martinique, Marrakesh, and Guadeloupe, before returning to Paris to focus on her music career. She received a baccalauréat diploma, but afterwards decided to pause her studies in order to prioritize her career.

== Career ==
Prior to competing in Star Academy, Berger had participated in The Voice Kids, although her blind audition was never broadcast. She also worked as a voice actress, performing the French dubbing for the character Zoe Neuman in the Amazon Prime Video series The Boys.

=== 2025–present: Star Academy and debut studio album ===
In 2025, Berger was cast in season 13 of the TF1 singing competition series Star Academy. She was one of the nine contestants to secure a spot in the annual Star Academy tour, and later went on to win the competition after defeating Léa Doffey in the finale, receiving 59% of the public vote. In the aftermath of the series, Berger signed recording contracts with RCA Records and Sony Music France. Additionally, Berger was also awarded a cash prize of €100,000 for winning the competition.

In June 2026, Berger released her debut single "J'me demande".

== Discography ==
=== Singles ===
List of singles, with selected chart positions, showing year released, certifications and album name
Title	Year	Peak chart positions		Certifications	Album
Title	Year	FRA	BEL (WA)	Certifications	Album
"J'me demande"	2026	—	—		Non-album single
"J'laisse parler"	2026	—	—		Non-album single
"—" denotes a recording that did not chart or was not released in that country.
