= Stay with Me (Ironik song) =

Single by Ironik

from the album No Point in Wasting Tears
- Released: 22 June 2008 (digital download); 30 June 2008 (physical)
- Recorded: 2007
- Genre: Hip hop; R&B
- Length: 3:39 (album version)
- Label: Asylum; Warner Music
- Songwriters: James Charters; Nick Jarl; David Stenmarck; Andreas Carlsson; Tim Cox; Nigel Swanston
- Producers: Alex James Sparks; Louis Gibzen; Nick Jarl

Ironik singles chronology
"So Nice" (2007)	"Stay with Me" (2008)	"I Wanna Be Your Man" (2008)

"Stay with Me" (sometimes subtitled "Everybody's Free") is the first single from Ironik's debut album No Point in Wasting Tears. The song peaked at number five on the UK Singles Chart.

== Song information ==
The song was written for his younger sister. There was a message in the lyrics for her; Ironik said "With all these people dying, if anything happens to me, there's a message in it for her." The track was produced by Alex James Sparks and samples lyrics of the song "Everybody's Free (To Feel Good)" by Quindon Tarver, which is a cover of the Rozalla hit "Everybody's Free". It also heavily samples the song "Written in the Stars" by Westlife, used as the main melody and for the chorus. Both samples are high-pitched. The single was released in both a one-track version and an enhanced 6-track CD, with 5 remixes of the song as well as the radio edit.

An acoustic version of the song was performed for Live Lounge on BBC Radio 1 and appears on the compilation Radio 1's Live Lounge – Volume 3.

In 2022, "Stay with Me" was sampled by British rapper ArrDee on his single "Come & Go", which reached number 16 on the UK Singles Chart.

== Chart performance ==
The single was released on 23 June 2008 for download and it entered the UK Singles Chart at number 13 before climbing to number six the week of its physical release. A week later, the song rose to its peak position of number five in the chart on 13 July 2008. On 20 July, it fell to number eight where it remained for two weeks.

In Ireland, the song reached its peak of number 10 in its first week (12 July 2008) and then fell one place to number 11 the next week. Later it peaked at number 8.

== Music video ==
The video features Ironik in different scenes throughout London where bad events have happened. The main being his girlfriend who is in hospital and him visiting her. He later visits her and sees her bed is empty. Fearing the worst, he turns to see her standing behind him in good health. He is also seen in a church.

== Track listing ==
UK CD single

1. "Stay with Me (Everybody's Free)" (Original Version)

UK Maxi-single

1. "Stay with Me (Everybody's Free)" (Radio Edit)
2. "Stay with Me" (Wiley/Chipmunk Remix)
3. "Stay with Me" (Agent X Remix) (Ironik/Chipmunk)
4. "Stay with Me" (Niteryders Remix)
5. "Stay with Me" (Rolla Remix)
6. "Stay with Me" (MySparks Edit)

== Charts ==
=== Weekly charts ===
Chart (2008)	Peak position
Belgium (Ultratip Bubbling Under Flanders)	22
Czech Republic Airplay (ČNS IFPI)	11
Ireland (IRMA)	8
Scotland Singles (OCC)	2
Sweden (Sverigetopplistan)	16
UK Singles (OCC)	5
UK Hip Hop/R&B (OCC)	1

=== Year-end charts ===
Chart (2008)	Position
UK Singles (Official Charts Company)	68

== Certifications ==
Region	Certification	Certified units/sales
United Kingdom (BPI)	Gold	400,000^{^}
^{^} Shipments figures based on certification alone.
