= Mpho =

- Born: Mpho Skeef; 1982 or 1983 (age 42–43); South Africa
- Genres: Pop
- Occupations: Singer, songwriter
- Years active: 2004–present
- Labels: Documented, Wall of Sound/PIAS, Parlophone/EMI

Mpho Skeef (pronounced /mpʰo skʲɪəf/, born 1982 or 1983), known by her stage name of Mpho, is a South African-born British singer-songwriter based in London.

== Early and personal life ==
Skeef was born during the apartheid regime in South Africa to Sipho Mabuse and Mary Edwards. Her first name is a SeSotho word meaning "gift". Mpho spent her first birthday imprisoned in Caledon Square, Cape Town with her mother who was an anti-apartheid campaigner. She moved to the United Kingdom at the age of four and was brought up in Stockwell, Clapham and Brixton by her mother and her stepfather, Eugene Skeef. She attended the BRIT School in Croydon.

== Career ==
Mpho began working in the music industry in 2004, initially as a backing vocalist for artists such as Ms Dynamite, Natasha Bedingfield, Ty, Terri Walker, Skinnyman, Rodney P, and Spacek. She was a lead vocalist on the Bugz in the Attic single "Booty La La", which reached number 44 on the UK Singles Chart. She signed to the Arts Council-funded record label Documented Records and, in 2005, released her debut single, "Comin' for Ya", and the four-track EP Don't Like You.

By late 2006, Mpho had joined PIAS Recordings/Wall of Sound on the strength of Don't Like You, and was preparing an electro-influenced album titled To Spite My Face with producers including Spacek, dBridge, and Yan Murawski. She also sang on the track "This Island Earth" on Coldcut's 2006 album Sound Mirrors, and released a second solo single, "What You Waiting For?", the same year.

By 2009, sessions for the album — now titled Pop Art — had gone into a heavily pop music direction with producers such as Future Cut, Rick Nowels, Rob Davis, and Switch. As such, Mpho issued the mixtape Mpho & the Art of Pop in January 2009 with DJ Beware. To fund extensive promotion of the album Pop Art, Wall of Sound brokered Mpho a five-album deal with EMI's Parlophone subsidiary.

Mpho's first single on Parlophone, the Switch-produced "Box N Locks" (which samples Martha and the Muffins' "Echo Beach"), was released in July 2009, but did not enter the UK Singles Chart. Pop Art was scheduled to follow in October 2009, but following minimal airplay of second single "See Me Now" (featuring rapper Wale), the album was shelved. Mpho subsequently announced via Twitter that Parlophone had dropped her due to creative differences. Also in October, Mpho featured on the charity single "I Got Soul" with artists such as Frankmusik and VV Brown under the group name Young Soul Rebels; the single reached number ten in the UK, and proceeds went to War Child UK.

In 2010, Mpho opened a vintage tea shop in Brixton with her sister. In 2012, she performed a one-off gig at London's Tate Modern gallery as part of an event celebrating the South London Black Music Archive.

== Artistry ==
Mpho's influences include André 3000 of OutKast, Cassandra Wilson, Kate Bush, Kraftwerk, Mary J. Blige, Prince, Soul II Soul, and Stevie Wonder—artists, she says, "who are creative and don't just follow a clear and obvious formula". She frequently includes a cover of Bush's "Running Up That Hill" in her live set lists. More generally, Mpho has cited music of the 1970s and 1980s as an inspiration.

== Discography ==
=== EPs ===
- Don't Like You (EP, 2005)

=== Singles ===
- 2004: "Booty La La" (with Bugz in the Attic) – UK No. 44
- 2005: "Comin' for Ya"
- 2005: "Holla" (with Baby J.)
- 2006: "What You Waiting For?"
- 2009: "Box N Locks"
- 2009: "See Me Now" (feat. Wale)
