= Ironik =

British musician (born 1988)

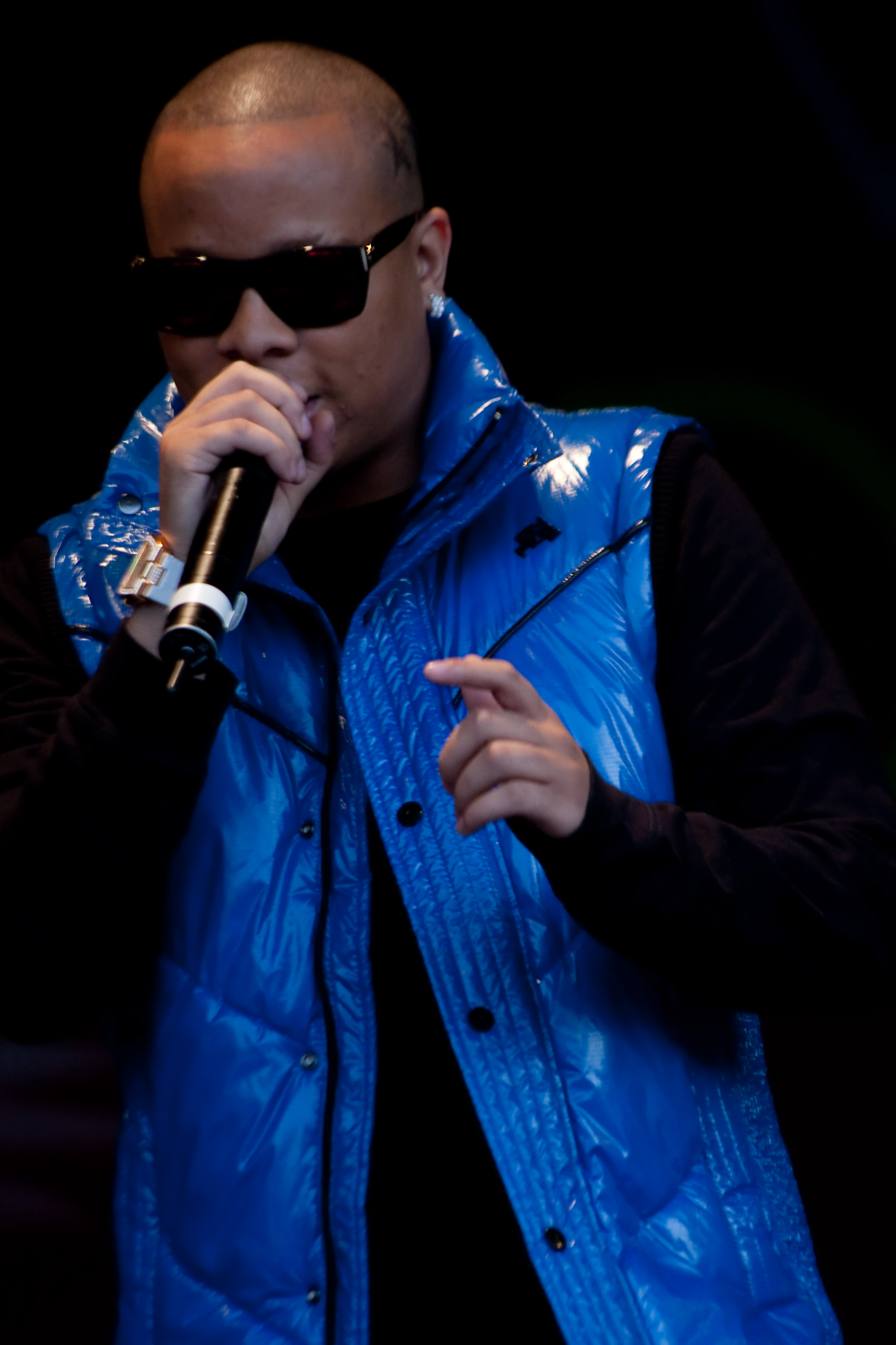
- Ironik in London in 2009

Background information
- Born: James Christian Richards-Charters; 18 January 1988 (age 38)
- Origin: Highgate, London, England
- Genres: Hip hop; grime; garage; R&B
- Occupations: Rapper; DJ; songwriter
- Instrument: Vocals
- Years active: 2007–present
- Labels: Asylum Records (2008–2010); BPM ENT (2010–2012); 3Starz (2013–2014); Creating Monsters (2015–2017); RU Listening (2017-Present)
- Website: www.instagram.com/djironik/

James Christian Charters (born 18 January 1988), better known as Ironik (formerly as DJ Ironik), is a British musician, DJ and rapper. His genre of music varies from hip hop, grime, R&B and UK garage. DJ Ironik was born in London.

DJ Ironik has had three UK top 10 hits; Stay With Me charted at No. 5, Tiny Dancer (Hold Me Closer) charted at No. 3 and also I Got Soul, a charity single which reached No. 10 in the UK charts and has also had several top 5 hits in other European countries.

== Early life ==
James Charters was born in North London to a Jamaican father and an English Mother of half Zimbabwean descent and some English roots. He decided on a career in music at an early age when doing GCSE in music. He first began to DJ at age 12, and started to produce at age 15. He started his career as a DJ working in clubs, initially in his home country, but his talent was quickly spotted and he moved around Europe. Every record he released charted in the Top 40 UK Charts throughout 2008–2011.

== Career ==
At the age of 20, he signed with Asylum Records which is a subsidiary of Warner Music Group.

The first hit was the single "Stay with Me (Everybody's Free)" which went into the UK charts at number 11 on downloads alone, then charted at number 5 on its physical release. It equally had success on Channel U, remaining in the request chart top 10 for 26 weeks. The remix to "Stay with Me" features Chipmunk and Wiley.

His second single, "I Wanna Be Your Man" was released in September 2008 and reached number 35 in the UK.

His début album No Point in Wasting Tears was released on Warner Music UK on 29 September 2008 and charted at 21 in the UK. Ironik has since left Warner Music UK and signed to independent label BPM Entertainment. He is currently signed with UK and Dubai based independent label RU Listening

The third single taken from his début album is "Tiny Dancer (Hold Me Closer)" which features grime rap artist Chipmunk and Sir Elton John. The song was released in the UK on 26 April 2009 and it charted at number 3 in the UK. This was followed by the re-release of his album on 11 May 2009.

He was nominated for 'Best Newcomer' at the 2008 MOBO Awards and 'Best Newcomer' and Best Music Video ("Stay with Me") at the 2008 Urban Music Awards. He was also nominated for 'Best Male Music in Film' at the Screen Nation Film & TV Awards in November 2008, and voted by the public viewers of MTV UK the third 'favourite artist of the year' 2008, coming after Katy Perry and Duffy.

Throughout October and November 2008 Ironik supported German Euro dance group Cascada on their second UK tour - The Perfect Day Tour 2008.

In 2009 he was nominated for 'Best UK Act' at the 2009 Mobo Awards.

== Personal life ==
While returning to his home in North London from a gig in Essex, Ironik became the victim of a stabbing attack at around 3 a.m. on 6 November 2010, when two men attacked him for his jewellery, knifing him in the right buttock. Ironik said of the stabbing: "It was something I've never experienced in my life before. Something that I've spoke about in a lot of my records - some of my records - actually. I find it very low that someone has to go take what you have and what you work for. I've kind of got over it and trying to get back on to living my life and being normal. The past is behind, and I'm trying to get on with my life. I'm back to normal, back to work 100% and I'm just happy that everyone was really supportive. I'll always be involved in charity work and especially the anti-gun and knife crime thing. It's a very important thing... I'll always be a part of supporting it, even before the incident, but obviously now more so." The DJ has been reported to have recovered now.

== Awards and nominations ==
Year	Nominee / work	Award	Result
2008	Ironik	Mobo Awards - Best Newcomer	Runner-up
2009	Ironik	Mobo Awards - Best UK Act	Runner-up
2009	Ironik	Habbo Music Awards - Best UK Act	Winner

== Discography ==
=== Studio albums ===
List of albums, with selected chart positions
Title	Album details	Peak chart positions
Title	Album details	UK
No Point in Wasting Tears	Released: 29 September 2008; Labels: Asylum, Warner Music Group; Formats: CD, digital download	21
Truth Be Told	Released: 22 September 2017; Labels: RU Listening Ltd; Formats: CD, digital download	–

=== Extended plays ===
List of extended plays, with selected chart positions
Title	Album details	Peak chart positions
Title	Album details	UK
Independently Unstoppable E.P	Released: 2 June 2013; Labels: 3Starz; Formats: Digital download	68
T.O.B.D (Ticking Off Boyhood Dreams)	Released: 19 April 2015; Labels: Creating Monsters; Formats: digital download	—
Past Present Future EP	Released: 28 February 2016; Labels: Creating Monsters; Formats: digital download	—
Home EP	Released: 2 June 2023; Labels: RU Listening Ltd; Formats: digital download	—

=== Singles ===
List of singles, with selected chart positions and certifications, showing year released and album name
Title	Year	Peak chart positions					Certifications	Album
Title	Year	UK	UK R&B	AUS	IRE	SWE	Certifications	Album
"Stay with Me"	2008	5	2	–	8	16	BPI: Gold	No Point in Wasting Tears
"I Wanna Be Your Man"	2008	35	9	—	38	—		No Point in Wasting Tears
"Tiny Dancer (Hold Me Closer)" (featuring Chipmunk & Elton John)	2009	3	2	41	17	–	BPI: Silver	No Point in Wasting Tears
"Falling in Love" (featuring Jessica Lowndes)	2010	40	3	—	51	—		Non-album singles
"Killed Me" (featuring McLean)	2011	–	—	—	—	—		Non-album singles
"Tuff" (featuring Snoop Dogg)	2017	—	—	—	—	—		Truth Be Told

=== As a featured performer ===
Title	Year	Peak chart positions					Album
Title	Year	UK	UK R&B	AUS	IRE	SWE	Album
"I Got Soul" (with Young Soul Rebels)	2009	10	5	—	19	—	Young Soul Rebels single
"Dancing" (Union J featuring Ironik)	2018	—	—	—	—	—	TBA
"Don't Wanna Die" (John Galea featuring Ironik)	2023	—	—	—	—	—	The Art Of Collaboration E.P
