= Star Academy (French TV series) =

- Star Academy season 8 logo
- Genre: Interactive talent show Reality
- Directed by: Franck Broqua; Jean-Jacques Amsellem
- Presented by: Primes : Nikos Aliagas (1–8, 10-); Mathieu Delormeau (9); Tonya Kinzinger (9); After : Karima Charni (10-)
- Narrated by: Karima Charni (11-)
- Country of origin: France
- Original language: French
- No. of seasons: 12
- No. of episodes: 164 (TF1); 13 (NRJ 12)

Production
- Production locations: Studio 206 (1); Studios 204 Plateau B (2–5); Studio 217 (6–8, 11-); Studio 130 (9); Studios du Lendit L5 (10)
- Production companies: Endemol France (2001–2013, 2022–); Niouprod (2001–2008)

Original release
- Network: TF1
- Release: 20 October 2001 – 19 December 2008
- Network: NRJ 12
- Release: 6 December 2012 – 28 February 2013
- Network: TF1
- Release: 15 October 2022 – present

Related
- The Voice: la plus belle voix (TF1)

Star Academy is a French reality singing competition produced by Endemol France. Forming part of the Star Academy franchise, it has been broadcast on TF1 (2001–2008 and since 2022) and NRJ 12 (2012–2013). During the competition, the contestants stay in the Dammarie-lès-Lys's Vives-Eaux castle. At the end of each season, selected contestants go on tour around France, Belgium, Morocco, Switzerland, Tunisia, and other French-speaking countries.

The reality show is hosted by Nikos Aliagas and has featured guest stars such as Mariah Carey, Madonna, Britney Spears, Beyoncé, Rihanna, Katy Perry, Katseye, Jonas Brothers, Miley Cyrus, Celine Dion, The Corrs, Texas, Simple Plan, Moby, Tina Arena, Nelly Furtado, Tokio Hotel, Anastacia, Alicia Keys, Craig David, 50 Cent, will.i.am, Destiny's Child, James Blunt, Sean Combs, Sting, David Guetta, Lenny Kravitz, Janet Jackson, Liza Minnelli, Phil Collins, Laura Pausini, Kylie Minogue, Tina Turner, Andrea Bocelli, Charles Aznavour, Hélène Ségara, Lorie, Lara Fabian, Shania Twain, Avril Lavigne, Alizée, Johnny Hallyday, Paul Anka, Lionel Richie, Alanis Morissette, Ray Charles, Stevie Wonder, Elton John, Bee Gees, and Ricky Martin. It spawned an equally successful show in Canada called Star Académie.

== History ==
The first eight seasons were broadcast on TF1 from 20 October 2001 to 19 December 2008.

The prime time shows and daily broadcasts were hosted by Nikos Aliagas. Special episodes (tours, anniversaries, best moments) were also aired, generally between each season.

The program's broadcast on this channel ended after its eighth edition, which concluded on 19 December 2008.

== Seasons ==
The contestants are classed in order.

=== Season 1 ===
- Jenifer Bartoli (winner) – participated in the Star Academy Tour, released debut album Jenifer and follow-up Le Passage. Also released live CD & DVD Jenifer fait son live.
- Mario Barravecchia (finalist) – participated in the Star Academy Tour
- Jean-Pascal Lacoste (semi-finalist) – participated in the Star Academy Tour
- Carine Haddadou (semi-finalist)
- Olivia Ruiz (semi-finalist) – participated in the Star Academy Tour, released debut album J'aime pas l'amour in 2003 and follow-up album La Femme Chocolat in 2005.
- Jessica Marquez – participated in the Star Academy Tour
- Patrice Maktav – participated in the Star Academy Tour
- Djalil Amine – participated in the Star Academy Tour
- François Roure – participated in the Star Academy Tour
- Cécile Boutry
- Sidonie Koch
- Grégory Gulli – participated in the Star Academy Tour
- Stéphane Bosmans
- Amandine Bisqueret
- Khalifa M'Baye
- Catherine

=== Season 2 ===
- Nolwenn Leroy (winner) – participated in the Star Academy Tour, released debut album Nolwenn and follow-up Histoires Naturelles. Also released live CD & DVD Histoires Naturelles Tour.
- Houcine Camara (finalist) – participated in the Star Academy Tour
- Emma Daumas (semi-finalist) – participated in the Star Academy Tour
- Georges-Alain Jones – (semi-finalist) participated in the Star Academy Tour
- Aurélie Konaté – participated in the Star Academy Tour
- Jérémy Chatelain – participated in the Star Academy Tour
- Anne-Laure Sibon – participated in the Star Academy Tour
- Fabien Fasake – participated in the Star Academy Tour
- Alexandre Balduzzi – participated in the Star Academy Tour
- Isabelle Lem
- Eva Chemouni
- Rudy Carvalho
- Philip Miro
- Nazim
- Florence
- Stéphanie Hansen

Season 2 of Star Academy launched some singers with successful solo careers – winner Nolwenn but also Emma, who reinvented herself as France's answer to Avril Lavigne; singer, songwriter and producer Jérémy Chatelain who married Alizée; singer-songwriter Georges-Alain Jones; Aurelie Konate who appeared in the comedie-musicale Belles belles belles based on the music of Claude François.

=== Season 3 ===
- Élodie Frégé (winner) – participated in the Star Academy Tour and released debut CD Elodie Frégé early in 2004 and 3 others in 2006, 2007 and 2010.
- Michal (finalist) – participated in the Star Academy Tour
- Sofia Essaïdi (semi-finalist) – participated in the Star Academy Tour and released debut CD Mon cabaret in 2005.
- Patxi Garat (semi-finalist) – participated in the Star Academy Tour
- Morganne Matis – participated in the Star Academy Tour and released debut cd Une fille De L'ere in 2006
- Lukas Delcourt – participated in the Star Academy Tour – appeared in French drama series Sous le soleil.
- Pierre Bouley – participated in the Star Academy Tour and member of Premix.
- Romain Billard – participated in the Star Academy Tour and member of Premix
- Amina El Bennouni
- Stéphanie Dalmasso – appeared in French series Père et Maire.
- Edouard Algayon – participated in the Star Academy Tour (as guitarist), formed the trio Premix with Pierre and Romain, released CD Chambre 1512 which included single "Oui ou Non". Premix split amicably in late 2005.
- Anne Thibault
- Valérie Deniz De Boccard
- Marjorie Condoris
- Michaël Sapience
- Icaro Da Silva

After the highly successful season 2, much was expected of season 3 and the favourites were named at the beginning: Sofia and Michal. As it turned out, both of them made their respective male/female semi finals, joined by Elodie and Patxi respectively. Elodie ended up making it to the finals, where she beat Polish contestant Michal and become the winner of Star Academy 3.

Michal will return to the music scene in France in 2007 with his second album All Alone with my Gueule. Sofia ended up releasing her own album Mon cabaret in 2005.

=== Season 4 ===
- Grégory Lemarchal (winner) – participated in the Star Academy Tour
- Lucie Bernardoni (finalist) – participated in the Star Academy Tour
- Hoda Nekra (semi-finalist) – participated in the Star Academy Tour
- Mathieu Johann (semi-finalist) – participated in the Star Academy Tour
- Sofiane Tadjine-Lambert- participated in the Star Academy Tour
- Sandy François – participated in the Star Academy Tour
- John Eyzen – participated in the Star Academy Tour – came to play the role of Mercutio in the Asia Tour of Roméo et Juliette, de la Haine à l'Amour
- Francesca Antoniotti
- Harlem Parmentier – participated in the Star Academy Tour
- Enrique Toyos
- Radia Bensarsa – participated in the Star Academy Tour
- Morgan Auger
- Tina Gardinier
- Karima Charni
- Sebastien Degut
- Emilie Ducrot
- Gauthier Roubichou
- Lennie

Season 4 winner Grégory Lemarchal became the first male winner of Star Academy in France. He released his debut single "Écris l'histoire" and debut album Je deviens moi in France in 2005. Grégory also enjoyed success in 2006 with "Même si", a bilingual duet with Lucie Silvas of her song "What You're Made Of".

On 30 April 2007, Grégory Lemarchal died of complications due to cystic fibrosis while waiting for a lung transplant.

=== Season 5 ===
- Magalie Vaé (Winner – Also participated in the Star Academy Tour)
- Jérémy Amelin (Finalist – Also participated in the Star Academy Tour)
- Pascal Maunoury (Semi-finalist – Also participated in the Star Academy Tour)
- Ely Breton (Semi-finalist – Also participated in the Star Academy Tour)
- Emilie Minatchy (Semi-finalist – Also participated in the Star Academy Tour)
- Alexia Palombo (Also participated in the Star Academy Tour)
- Jean-Luc Guizonne (Also participated in the Star Academy Tour)
- Maud Verdeyen (Also participated in the Star Academy Tour)
- Pierre Frischeteau (Also participated in the Star Academy Tour)
- Arno Demessine(Also participated in the Star Academy Tour)
- Grégoire Bourdin
- Laure Ruhland
- Jill Vandermeulen
- Chloé Boucaud
- Mickael Tabury
- Moïse Quaresma
- Nassim & Neissa Parize

Season 5 was notable for the return of some familiar faces – season 1 and 2 directrice Alexia Laroche-Joubert returned in the same role, after which the role was filled in season 3 by Nathalie Andre, and in season 4 by Gerard Louvin. Also back was Raphaelle Ricci as prof of scenic expression.

Despite an expanded age limit on participants, there was only one noticeably participant – Jérémy Amelin (18). His popularity grew over the series and he eventually reached the finale where he faced, and lost to, Magalie Vaé.

Among the female contestants the early favourite was Emilie, a violinist who originated from the island of Reunion. However, her popularity with the jury was seemingly not shared by the public. In the female semi-final she and fellow student Ely were voted out in favour of Magalie, who had attracted much attention in France because, unlike previous Star Academy participants, she was overweight.

In the end, Magalie triumphed on 16 December 2005 and became the fifth Star Academy winner in France. Magalie sold the least CDs by a series winner compared to previous winners Jenifer and Nolwenn. This raises the question of whether the judging should be 100% in the hands of the voting public.

=== Season 6 ===
- Cyril Cinélu (Winner-Final week 16)
- Dominique Fidanza (Second place-Final week 16)
- Marina (Eliminated week 15 semi-final)
- Cynthia Brown (Eliminated week 15 semi-final)
- Ludovic (Eliminated week 14)
- Jean-Charles (Eliminated week 13)
- Brice (Eliminated week 12)
- Gaël (Eliminated week 11)
- Elfy (Eliminated week 10)
- Nicolas (Eliminated week 9)
- David (Eliminated week 8)
- Bastien (Eliminated week 7)
- Judith (Eliminated week 6)
- Faustine (Eliminated week 5)
- Céline (Eliminated week 4)
- Eloisha (Eliminated week 3
- Fafa (Eliminated week 2)
- Laurent (Eliminated week 1)

All of last year's profs returned this year including directrice Alexia Laroche-Joubert and dance teacher Kamel Ouali, the latter kept French fans guessing regarding his participation up to the last minute, as he remained involved in the popular musical Le Roi Soleil. Nikos Aliagas continued to present the daily updates and weekly "Prime" on Fridays.

The focus for this season was expected to shift from traditional songs to the "nouvelle chanson francaise" style made popular by singers like Benabar, Benjamin Biolay and former Star Ac 1 contestant Olivia Ruiz. Contestants Marina and Jean-Charles reflected this new musical style and Marina, in particular, was allowed to sing her own compositions on the "Prime".

Gael, whose musical style resembled that of the Gipsy Kings, eventually quit on 13 November, allegedly in relation to the refusal of the producers to allow him to record with the Gipsy Kings, whom his musical style clearly owed an allegiance to. There was also controversy over remarks made by Raphaelle Ricci following the eviction of fan favourite Nicolas Charvillat, suggesting that her fellow "profs" had decided to evict him before he even sang a note.

In the end Cyril, the first black person to win Star Academy or any singing contest in France, triumphed by 67% of the vote over Dominique (33%) on 22 December to become the sixth Star Academy winner in France.

This year was unusual as only seven students went on the tour: Cyril, Dominique, Cynthia, Jean-Charles, Brice, Marina, and Ludovic.

=== Season 7 ===
Contestants include

- Quentin Mosimann (winner) (will also participate in the Tour)
- Mathieu (finalist) (will also participate in the Tour)
- Claire-Marie (semi-finalist) (will also participate in the Tour)
- Bertrand (semi-finalist) (will also participate in the Tour)
- Jéremy (will also participate in the Tour)
- Lucie (will also participate in the Tour)
- Pierre
- Alexia
- Sevan
- Maureen
- Antoine
- Eva
- Claudia
- Noémie
- Dojima
- Yaëlle
- Alexandra

Maureen, the favorite, walked after 7 weeks. Mathieu had been nominated 8 times over Star Academy 7, but each time was favored by the public to continue. Until finally, improving his show greatly, ending up in the final where Quentin, the favorite of most spectators with 0 nominations, won by the close margin of 52.6% to 47.4% for Mathieu.

=== Season 8 ===
The eighth season debuted on 19 September 2008.

- The students are no longer in the chateau, but in a private hotel in the 3rd arrondissement of Paris, located at 12 rue Charlot (48°51′41″N 2°21′40″E)

The contestants in season 8 are:

Top 2 (the finale aired on 19/12/08) –

- Mickels Réa (winner)
- Alice Raucoules (runner-up)

Eliminated (in order of elimination) –

- Laure Cappellini (eliminated on 26/09/08)
- Gaëtan (eliminated on 3/10/08)
- Ana Palomo-Diaz (eliminated on 10/10/08)
- Julia Jean-Baptiste (eliminated on 17/10/08)
- Harold Haven (eliminated on 24/10/08)
- Yvane Beharry (voluntarily withdrew on 31/10/08)
- Marilyne Lecomte (eliminated on 7/11/08)
- Quentin LeMonnier (eliminated on 14/11/08)
- Anissa Stili (eliminated on 21/11/08 – double elimination)
- Édouard Privat (eliminated on 21/11/08 – double elimination)
- Solène Le Pierres (eliminated on 28/11/08 – quarter-finalist)
- Joanna Lagrave (eliminated on 05/12/08 – semi-finalist)
- Gautier Riese (eliminated on 12/12/08 – semi-finalist)

Alice has been nominated the most times, with five; but was saved by the public each time, with an overwhelming majority above two other nominees. The series also saw a decline in the ratings, as in the premiere week, it has received 5.5 million viewers with 29.6% share (mainly from their competition, NCIS on M6). This was considerably down from the previous series' 7.1 million viewers (30.7% share).

=== Season 9 ===
NRJ 12 decided to reboot the show after TF1 cancelled it in 2009, due to declining ratings. It began airing again from December 2012.

Season 9 contestants:

- Daniel, 20, Eliminated – 21 Feb (2013) – Semi-finals versus Laurene
- Nancy, 25, Eliminated – 31 Jan (2013)
- Sidoine, 23, Eliminated – 14 Feb (2013) – Semi-finals versus Zayra
- Romain, 25, Eliminated (quarter finals) – 7 Feb (2013)
- Vanina, 23, Eliminated (quarter finals) – 7 Feb (2013)
- Tony, 23, Eliminated – 17 Jan (2013)
- Mathilde, 20, Eliminated – 10 Jan (2013)
- Tad, 21, Eliminated – 20 Dec
- Jimmy, 25, Eliminated – 27 Dec
- Pauline, 18, Eliminated – 24 Jan (2013)
- Zayra, 25, Eliminated – 28 Feb (2013) – Finals versus Laurene
- Louis, 21, Eliminated – 3 Jan (2013)
- Laurene, 18 – Winner
- Manika, 22, Eliminated – 13 Dec

Laurene was nominated 2 times and Zayra only once. Zayra received the most number of marks in the history of Star academy, Zayra's and Star academy best mark was 19 out of 20.

=== Season 10 ===
After a break of ten years from the concept and a fourteen-year break from broadcasting it themselves, TF1 announced a return to Star Academy in France. The premiere of the tenth season of the show took part on 15 October 2022 on TF1 with the contestants moving into the castle that same evening. Nikos Aliagas again took up hosting the show, while British singer Robbie Williams was named the godfather of the programme for this season. Michael Goldman is the show's headmaster. The show had a notable change in the amount of contestants as only thirteen solo acts took part. The 2005 Bob Sinclar song "Love Generation" has been used as a generic theme throughout the promotion of the new season. The contestants stay in the Dammarie-lès-Lys's Vives-Eaux castle, which was renovated during summer 2022.

Name	Complete name	Age	Residence	Episode of elimination	Results
Anisha	Anisha Jo Anyjaine	22	Sannois	Final (26 November 2022)	Winner
Enola	Enola Cosnier	22	Bordeaux	Final (26 November 2022)	Finalist
Léa	Léa Haddad	24	Paris	Final (26 November 2022)	Semi-finalist
Louis	Louis Albiget	20	Boudy-de-Beauregard	Final (26 November 2022)	Semi-finalist
Tiana	Tiana Da Rocha	18	Meaux	Semi-final (19 November 2022)	Ninth out
Chris	Chris Camalon	28	Aix-en-Provence	Semi-final (19 November 2022)	Eighth out
Julien	Julien Canaby	20	Toulon	Episode 5 (12 November 2022)	Seventh out
Stan	Stanislas Souffoy-Rittner	24	Vannes	Episode 5 (12 November 2022)	Sixth out
Carla	Carla Hugon	23	Antibes	Episode 4 (5 November 2022)	Fifth out
Paola	Paola Perrin	23	Angers	Episode 4 (5 November 2022)	Fourth out
Ahcène	Ahcène Menacer	20	Charleville-Mézières	Episode 3 (29 October 2022)	Third out
Cenzo	Cenzo Tuihani	22	Bordeaux	Episode 3 (29 October 2022)	Second out
Amisse	Amisse Abdallah	20	Cergy-Pontoise	Episode 2 (22 October 2022)	First out

Anisha won by a solid margin of 57% to 43% for Enola.

=== Season 11 ===
For this eleventh season of Star Academy, the candidates are once again staying in the Château des Vives Eaux in Dammarie-les-Lys as was the case during the first seven seasons and the previous one. New this year: a special room, called the "public room", is appearing, to allow the students of the week to answer viewers' questions in a principle close to the "SMS evenings" of the early 2000s. The best student of each bonus, designated by the stage expression teacher, has the opportunity to go there the following Monday. The nominees of the week also have access to defend their place at the castle. The sound theme remains the same as for the previous season, namely "Love Generation" by Bob Sinclar, after having already been used for seasons 5 to 7. "Run Baby Run" by Bustafunk, the theme song for the third firsts seasons, is used exceptionally during the 48th daily. Despite rumors of his departure, TF1 confirmed, during a back-to-school press conference on 28 June 2023, the return of Michael Goldman once again as promotion director for the 11th season. The teaching staff remains the same as for the previous season with two changes. Yanis Marshall, dance teacher, gives way to dancer Malika Benjelloun, former choreographer of several international artists such as Puff Daddy, Billy Crawford or Robbie Williams and having also collaborated with the choreographers of singers Katy Perry and Madonna. Laure Balon, professor of stage expression, is replaced by Cécile Chaduteau, former dancer of Kamel Ouali during the first seasons of the program, former backing vocalist for the singers Johnny Hallyday and France Gall, and choreographer of the musical Flashdance – The Musical (2023).

The primetime scenes are supported by a co-choreographer, Angelo Recchia. James Blunt and Vitaa are the godfather and godmother of this new season, where their portrait is broadcast. A portrait of the candidates is also broadcast. Initially, 16 candidates were to enter on 4 November 2023, but on 30 October 2023, we learned that only 13 candidates will enter for "budgetary reasons". The Star Academy tour is returning this year, entitled Star Academy – Tour 2024. The ticket office opens on 3 November 2023. A daily 15-minute show around this tour, which was initially scheduled to be broadcast on TFX and TF1+ from 25 March 2024, was canceled at the last minute by the broadcaster and Endemol France due to the pace of the tour, deemed "very intense". Following the bonus dedicated to the tour on 15 December 2023, here are the students who will participate in the tour: Axel, Candice, Djebril, Héléna, Julien, Lénie and Pierre. The concert in Bercy at the Accor Arena on 8 June was broadcast live on TF1, the official broadcast of Star Academy. The winner is Pierre with 55.6% against Julien with 44.4%. He won 100,000 euros and a contract with Sony Music.

Name	Complete name	Age	Residence	Tour participation	Eliminated livetheme show	Place
Pierre	Pierre Garnier	21	Villedieu-les-Poêles	Yes	Final (3 February 2024)	Winner
Julien	Julien Liebermann	24	Pau	Yes	Final (3 February 2024)	Runner-up
Héléna	Héléna Bailly	21	Braine-l'Alleud (Belgium)	Yes	Semi-final 2 (27 January 2024)	Semi-finalist
Axel	Axel Marbeuf	23	Saint-Mammès	Yes	Semi-final 1 (20 January 2024)	Semi-finalist
Lénie	Lénie Vacher	18	La Ciotat	Yes	Quarter-final (13 January 2024)	Ninth out
Djebril	Djebril Slatni	23	Carros	Yes	Carte blanche (6 January 2024)	Eighth out
Candice	Candice Vernet	20	Cannes	Yes	Party of the 31st (30 December 2023)	Seventh out
Clara	Clara Chouikhi	22	Paris	No	Star Academy Tour (15 December 2023)	Sixth out
Margot	Margot Abate	25	Rouen	No	Showtime (9 December 2023)	Fifth out
Victorien	Victorien Breux	23	Frontignan	No	Philarmonic (2 December 2023)	Fourth out
Marie-Maud	Marie-Maud Bourgès	25	Aix-en-Provence	No	Duets (25 November 2023)	Third out
Lola	Lola Antolinos	21	Bourgoin-Jallieu	No	Childhood (17 November 2023)	Second out
Louis	Louis Montemont	24	Villers-lès-Nancy	No	First show (11 November 2023)	First out

==== Elimination table ====
Primes													Semi-finals		Final
Weeks:		04/11/2023	11/11/2023	17/11/2023	25/11/2023	02/12/2023	09/12/2023	15/12/2023	23/12/2023	30/12/2023	06/01/2024	13/01/2024	20/01/2024	27/01/2024	03/02/2024
Place	Contestant	Result													
1	Pierre		Safe	Safe	Safe	Safe	Safe	Saved by the public		Safe	Saved by the public	Immune		Saved by the public	Winner
2	Julien		Safe	Safe	Saved by the public	Safe	Safe	Saved by the public		Safe	Immune	Saved by the public	Saved by the public		Runner-up
3	Héléna		Safe	Safe	Saved by contestants	Safe	Immune	Immune		Safe	Saved by the public	Saved by the public		Eliminated	
4	Axel		Safe	Safe	Immune	Safe	Saved by contestants	Saved by the public		Safe	Saved by the public	Saved by the public	Eliminated		
5	Lénie		Safe	Safe	Safe	Safe	Immune	Immune		Safe	Immune	Eliminated			
6	Djebril		Saved by contestants	Safe	Safe	Saved by contestants	Immune	Saved by the public		Saved by the public	Eliminated				
7	Candice		Safe	Safe	Safe	Saved by the public	Saved by the public	Saved by the public		Eliminated					
8	Clara		Safe	Safe	Saved by the public	Safe	Safe	Eliminated							
9	Margot		Saved by the public	Safe	Safe	Safe	Eliminated								
10	Victorien		Safe	Saved by the public	Safe	Eliminated									
11	Marie-Maud		Safe	Saved by contestants	Eliminated										
12	Lola		Safe	Eliminated											
13	Louis		Eliminated												

Legend
Woman	Man	Nominated but saved by the public	Nominated but saved by the contestants	Nominated and eliminated	Already saved	Immune	No competition	Got out	Winner	Runner-up	Semi-finalist

=== Season 12 ===
For this twelfth season of Star Academy, the candidates will once again stay in the Château des Vives Eaux located in Dammarie-les-Lys in Seine-et-Marne, as was the case during the first seven seasons and since the tenth season in 2022. The castle will be equipped with 61 cameras which will follow the daily lives of its residents during daily broadcasts and live streams. Jean-Louis Blot, president of Endemol France, reveals that the singing room is changing location to be closer to that of the theater. A foyer was also added for students to practice their music or relax. The design of the bonus stage at Studio 217 has been revised to offer "more spectacular shows". It will be more square and equipped with platforms covered with screens that come out of the ground. A proscenium was also installed for a better approach to the artists and the public. Finally, a dressing room will be equipped with a camera, which will allow students to speak to their fans in the form of vlogs between two rehearsals. These videos will be broadcast on the Fan's box on TF1+. For this idea, TF1 declares that it was inspired by Candice, last season's candidate who produced daily vlogs of her adventures during the 2024 tour: "The idea came to us by seeing what Candice did during the tour on YouTube, and this inspired us to offer them this freedom to tell their feelings before the bonuses" confirms Rémi. For this new season, the godmother of the twelfth season of Star Academy is the French singer and songwriter Clara Luciani.

For this twelfth season, Michael Goldman, already director during seasons 10 and 11, retains his status. A fairly drastic change is taking place this year on the faculty side: Adeline Toniutti, singing teacher, gives way to opera singer, actress and teacher at the Paris conservatory, Sofia Morgavi. Hugues Hamelynck, Belgian actor, director and improviser, succeeds Pierre de Brauer to provide theater classes. The world champion athlete in the 100 metres hurdles, Ladji Doucouré, takes the place of Joël Bouraïma for sports classes and Fanny Delaigue, singer, dancer and pianist in musical, becomes co-rehearsalist alongside Lucie Bernardoni, succeeding Marlène Schaff; the latter is now in charge of stage expression courses, replacing Cécile Chaduteau. Also new this season, four artists such as Julien Doré, Lara Fabian, Patrick Fiori and the winner of season 11, Pierre Garnier, were designated "exceptional teachers", to offer students private lessons (sing, theater...) in the form of masterclass. The winner is Marine, she won Star Academy 2024 with a solid margin (65%). She receive 100,000 euros and sign a contract with Sony Music.

Name	Complete name	Age	Residence	Tour participation	Eliminated livetheme show	Place
Marine	Marine Delplace	24	Lille	Yes	Final (25 January 2025)	Winner
Ebony	Ebony Cham	20	L'Île-Saint-Denis	Yes	Final (25 January 2025)	Finalist
Franck	Franck Lenar	23	Bagneux	Yes	Semi-final 2 (18 January 2025)	Semi-finalist
Charles	Charles Doré	18	Pléneuf-Val-André	Yes	Semi-final 1 (11 January 2025)	Semi-finalist
Ulysse	Ulysse Saragas	25	Marseille	Yes	Quarter-final (4 January 2025)	Eleventh out
Marguerite	Marguerite Dedeyan	24	Paris	Yes	Carte blanche (28 December 2024)	Tenth out
Maïa	Maïa Wojcik	21	Valence	Yes	Professor's choice (14 December 2024)	Ninth out
Maureen	Maureen Valet	23	Montpellier	Yes	Musical (8 December 2024)	Eighth out
Julie	Julie Demierre	19	Carrouge (Switzerland)	No	Star Academy 2025 Tour (30 November 2024)	Seventh out
Masseo	Masseo Gayez-Banzept	18	Soullans	No	Star Academy 4 and Grégory Lemarchal tribute (23 November 2024)	Sixth out
Emma	Emma Broyon	22	Brunoy	Yes	Surprises (15 November 2024)	Fifth out
Noah	Noah Boisnoir	20	Aigues-Vives	No	Godmother's day (8 November 2024)	Fourth out
Thomas	Thomas Doppler Bianco	21	Leuville-sur-Orge	No	Linked destinies (2 November 2024)	Third out
Paul	Damien Fusté	23	Vannes	No	"All in chorus!" (26 October 2024)	Second out
Maylis	Maylis Rouard	23	Namur (Belgium)	No	First times (19 October 2024)	First out

==== Elimination table ====
Primes															Semi-finals		Final
Weeks:		12/10/2024	19/10/2024	26/10/2024	02/11/2024	08/11/2024	15/11/2024	23/11/2024	30/11/2024	07/12/2024	13/12/2024	21/12/2024	29/12/2024	04/01/2025	11/01/2025	18/01/2025	25/01/2025
Place	Contestant	Result															
1	Marine		Safe	Immune	Saved by the public	Safe	Safe	Immune	Saved by the public	Safe	Saved by the public		Safe	Saved by the public	Saved by the public		Winner
2	Ebony		Safe	Safe	Safe	Safe	Safe	Safe	Immune	Immune	Immune		Safe	Immune		Saved by the public	Runner-up
3	Franck		Safe	Safe	Safe	Safe	Safe	Safe	Saved by the public	Immune	Immune		Safe	Saved by the public		Eliminated	
4	Charles		Safe	Safe	Safe	Safe	Saved by the public	Safe	Saved by the public	Saved by the public	Immune		Safe	Saved by the public	Eliminated		
5	Ulysse		Safe	Safe	Saved by the public	Saved by the public	Safe	Saved by the public	Saved by the public	Safe	Saved by the public		Saved by the public	Eliminated			
6	Marguerite		Safe	Safe	Safe	Safe	Immune	Safe	Exceptionally immune	Immune	Saved by the public		Eliminated				
7	Maïa		Safe	Safe	Saved by contestants	Safe	Safe	Saved by contestants	Saved by the public	Immune	Eliminated						
8	Maureen		Safe	Safe	Immune	Saved by contestants	Safe	Safe	Exceptionally immune	Eliminated							
9	Julie		Safe	Safe	Safe	Safe	Safe	Safe	Eliminated								
10	Masseo		Safe	Saved by the public	Exceptionally immune	Immune	Saved by contestants	Eliminated									
11	Emma		Safe	Safe	Exceptionally immune	Immune	Eliminated										
12	Noah		Safe	Saved by contestants	Safe	Eliminated											
13	Thomas		Saved by the public	Safe	Eliminated												
14	Paul		Saved by contestants	Eliminated													
15	Maylis		Eliminated														

Legend
Woman	Man	Nominated but saved by the public	Nominated but saved by the contestants	Nominated and eliminated	Already saved	Immune	Exceptionally immune	No competition	Got out	Winner	Runner-up	Semi-finalist

=== Season 13 ===
For this thirteenth season of Star Academy, the candidates are once again staying in the Château des Vives-Eaux located in Dammarie-les-Lys in Seine-et-Marne, as was the case during the first seven seasons and since the return of the musical program in 2022. The director's office is making its return, after its absence the previous year. A recording studio has also been set up in the castle. Within the castle grounds, no fewer than 76 cameras will be installed to guarantee viewers a 360-degree immersion. Each week, the dance teacher will choose a student to perform a song-and-dance number. The best of the season will be presented on the tour. The number one student of the week will win the right to open the next prime right after the anthem with a solo performance. Students will have the opportunity to present themselves to the audience during each prime through a self-portrait that will take the form of a large medley mixing theater and singing. "The impossible exercise" will confront the candidates with the hazards of live performance such as a microphone failure or singing another student's part at the last minute. The "face-offs" will pit two students against each other around a discipline such as theater, singing, or dance. Some artists will be involved in the staging, choreography, etc. The Studio 217 will have a brand-new set, with a giant screen that will span the entire stage, a modular stage leading up to the teachers' table, and a surprising innovation: a moving walkway integrated into the turntable, allowing the artists to be immersed in the set and offer new staging. Another major new feature: a huge stage curtain capable of projecting images.

For this thirteenth season, Michael Goldman, director since the show's return in 2022, retains his status. The teaching staff remains identical to the previous year, except for the arrival of Jonathan Jenvrin, a choreographer who has collaborated with Dua Lipa, Rihanna and Kamel Ouali in particular, as dance teacher in place of Malika Benjelloun, and the arrival of Alain Degois in charge of theater classes, replacing Hugues Hamelynck. Nicknamed "Papy", in reference to his imitation of "Papy Mougeot" in the sketch Le Schmilblick by Coluche, he is the founder of an improvisation company, "Déclic Théâtre" which has helped to reveal, among others, Jamel Debbouze, Omar Sy and Sophia Aram. On September 5, 2025, TF1 announced in a press release on X that the singers Ed Sheeran and Charlotte Cardin are the official godfather et godmother of this season, and this is also the second time that the godfathers of Star Academy are not French, since Kylie Minogue and Céline Dion were the godmothers of Star Academy, back in 2007, for the seventh season. The winner of this thirteenth season is Ambre, having won with 58% of the public votes.

Name	Complete name	Age	Residence	Tour participation	Status
Ambre	Ambre Berger	18	Paris	Yes	Winner (7 February 2026)
Léa	Léa Doffey	22	Bellmund (Switzerland)	Yes	Finalist (7 February 2026)
Victor	Victor Aupecle	24	Paris	Yes	Semi-finalist (31 January 2026)
Sarah	Sarah N'Dri Youetto	23	Marne-la-Vallée	Yes	Semi-finalist (24 January 2026)
Bastiaan	Bastiaan Van Leeuwen	23	Le Mesnil-le-Roi	Yes	Twelfth out (17 January 2026)
Anouk	Anouk Brackelaire	20	Wanze (Belgium)	Yes	Eleventh out (10 January 2026)
Théo P.	Théo Pasquier	25	Valenciennes	Yes	Tenth out (3 January 2026)
Mélissa	Mélissa Fesch	19	Romainville	Yes	Ninth out (27 December 2025)
Jeanne	Jeanne Viard	22	Agen	Yes	Eight out (20 December 2025)
Léo	Léo Lefebvre	24	Lille	No	Seventh out (13 December 2025)
Lily	Lily Campana	22	Marseille	No	Sixth out (5 December 2025)
Théo L.	Théo Laurent	23	Orléans	No	Fifth out (29 November 2025)
Léane	Léane N'Gangue	19	Montpellier	No	Fourth out (21 November 2025)
Ema	Emma Cereghino	25	Toulouse	No	Abandonment (14 November 2025)
Noah	Noah Kasongo Bitangili	20	Antony	No	Third out (7 November 2025)
Lenny	Lenny Rakovic	21	Le Coudray-Montceaux	No	Second out (1 November 2025)
Mehdi	Mehdi Patritti	20	Avignon	No	First out (25 October 2025)

== See also ==
- List of French television series
- Music of France
