= Jeanne Viard =

French singer-songwriter (born 2003)

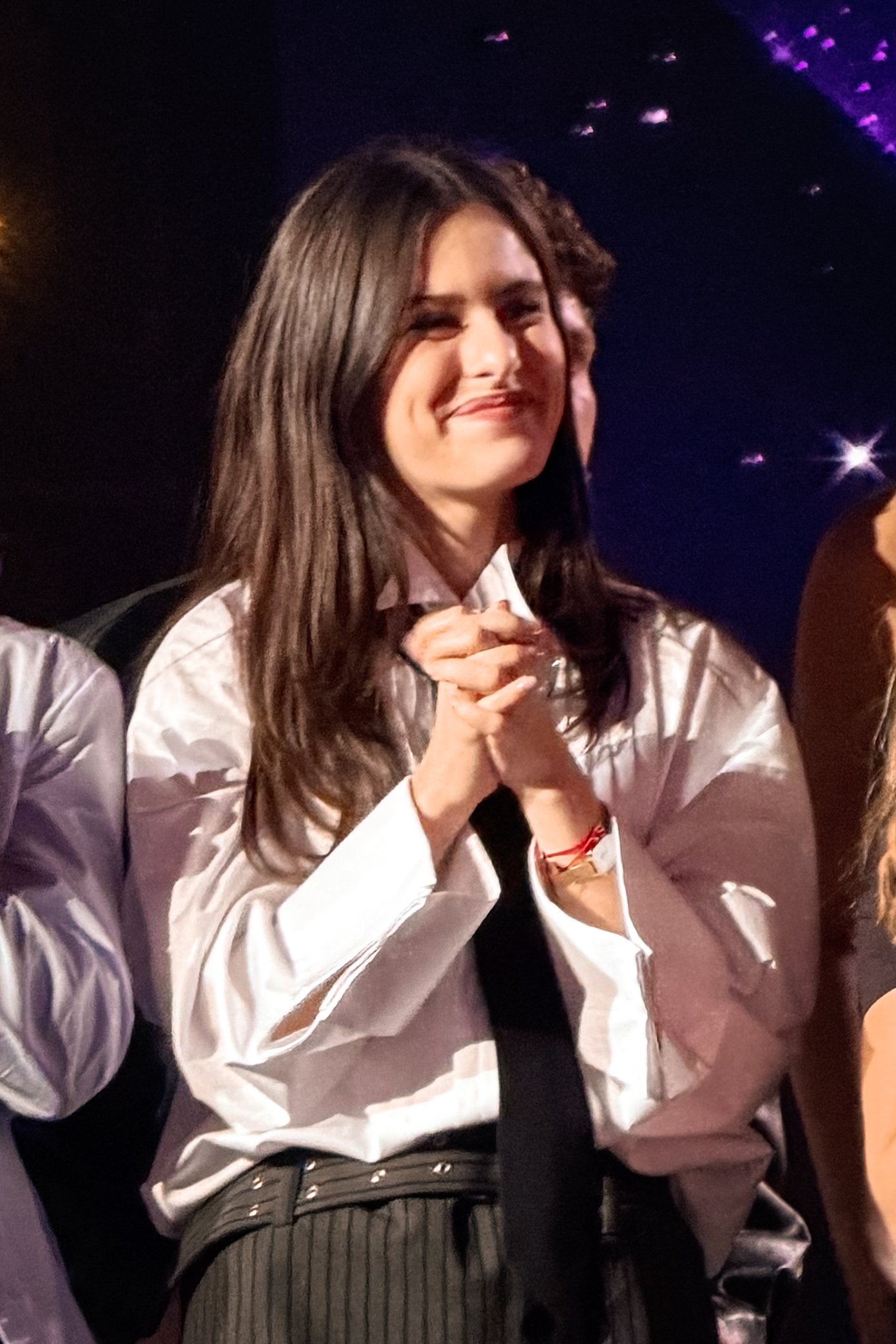
- Viard in 2026

Background information
- Also known as: Jeanne
- Born: Jeanne Naïri Viard; 2 September 2003 (age 23); Mont-de-Marsan, France
- Origin: Agen, France
- Genres: Pop; chanson
- Occupations: Singer; songwriter
- Instruments: Vocals; piano
- Years active: 2025–present
- Labels: Columbia; Sony Music France

Jeanne Naïri Viard (born 2 September 2003), also known professionally as simply Jeanne, is a French singer and songwriter. Viard rose to prominence after participating in the thirteenth season of the TF1 singing competition series Star Academy (2025–2026), where she placed ninth.

== Early life and education ==
Viard was born on 2 September 2003 in Mont-de-Marsan in the Landes department to a musical family. Viard has one elder brother. Through her mother, she is of Armenian descent. Her parents encouraged her interest in music and enrolled her in the Conservatoire des Landes to study piano at a young age.

When she was 15 years old, Viard relocated to Agen in the Lot-et-Garonne department after her parents separated. She was educated at Lycée Bernard Palissy in Agen and pursued a law degree in Toulouse before ending her studies to focus on music instead. Prior to appearing on Star Academy, Viard worked as a teaching assistant at a collège.

== Career ==
=== 2025–present: Star Academy, "Respire fort", and Naïri ===
Viard began her career in 2025, with the independent release of her debut single "Respire fort" in July 2025. Later that year, Viard was cast in season 13 of the TF1 singing competition series Star Academy. Viard performed "Respire fort" during the show's 14 November 2025 episode, resulting in it experiencing a large uptick in streams online. She went on to secure a spot on the annual Star Academy nationwide tour, before being eliminated from the series in December 2025, placing ninth.

In the aftermath of the competition, Viard signed recording contracts with Columbia Records and Sony Music France. Afterwards, she released the official music video for "Respire fort" and the song became certified gold in France by the SNEP.

In May 2026, she released the single "Tu restes là". In September 2026, she released her debut extended play Naïri.

== Discography ==
=== Extended plays ===
Title	Details	Peak chart positions	
Title	Details	FRA	BEL (WA)
Naïri	Released: 11 September 2026; Label: Sony Music France; Formats: Digital download, streaming	—	17
"—" denotes a recording that did not chart or was not released in that country.

=== Singles ===
List of singles, with selected chart positions, showing year released, certifications and album name
Title	Year	Peak chart positions		Certifications	Album
Title	Year	FRA	BEL (WA)	Certifications	Album
"Respire fort"	2025	57	45	SNEP: Gold	Non-album single
"Tu restes là"	2026	—	—		Non-album single
"Les règles"	2026	—	—		Non-album single
"—" denotes a recording that did not chart or was not released in that country.
