= McLean (singer) =

- Also known as: Digga
- Born: Anthony McLean; 24 June 1980 (age 45)
- Origin: London, United Kingdom
- Genres: R&B, soul, hip hop, grime
- Occupations: Singer, songwriter
- Instrument: Vocals
- Years active: 2006–present
- Labels: Asylum, Atlantic

McLean (born Anthony McLean, 24 June 1980) is a British singer from London. He was signed to Asylum Records and then Atlantic Records. His debut single "Broken" was released on 26 October 2009. The song was produced by The Schizofreniks and first released independently on 26 March 2007 on Schizofreniks Records, and has since then accrued over 20 million hits across major social networking sites, including YouTube and MySpace.

== Early life and career ==
McLean was born in 1980 in London. He is the son of the lovers rock musician, John McLean. He is the brother of the footballer Aaron McLean. Under the pseudonym of "Digga", he collaborated with MJ Cole on "Gotta Have It"; then with drum and bass duo Chase & Status on the song "Take U There", which featured on the debut album, More Than Alot. “Broken” was the underground song that caught the eye of big record companies and Mclean was signed to Atlantic.

=== Debut album ===
McLean worked with record producers Fraser T Smith, Phil Tan, Dylan "3D" Dresdow, Nate 'Danja' Hills, plus Naughty Boy (of Wiley and Chipmunk fame). Confirmed songs included "My Name", "Great Escape", "Try Me", "Finally in Love", "Broken" and the Smith-produced "One More Night". However, the album was never released. In 2013, Mclean released a free album on SoundCloud called Digga’s House. In 2019, there were rumours McLean was soon to release a much anticipated EP.

== Personal life ==
He is the nephew of 1990s singer Bitty McLean and is the older brother of professional footballer Aaron McLean.

McLean has two daughters from a past relationship and is currently residing in Essex with his partner.

== Discography ==
=== Singles ===
Year	Title	Peak chart positions		Album
Year	Title	UK	UK R&B	Album
2009	"Broken"	—	22	Finally in Love (unreleased)
2010	"My Name"	10	5	Finally in Love (unreleased)
2010	"Finally in Love"	44	16	Finally in Love (unreleased)
2013	"Lie to Me"	—	—	—
As a featured artist
2009	"I Got Soul" (with Young Soul Rebels)	10	1	Charity single
2011	"Killed Me" (with Ironik)	—	—	Ironik
2011	"Someone" (with Friction)	—	—	Non-Album single

=== Guest appearances ===
Year	Single	Album
2010	"Take U There" (with Chase & Status)	More Than Alot
2010	"Bringing It Home" (with Frisco)	Fully Grown
2010	"I Made It" (with Devlin)	"Bud, Sweet & Beers"
