= Sunny Days (Kid British song) =

Single by Kid British
- Released: 20 April 2009
- Recorded: 2009
- Genre: Ska, indie
- Label: Mercury Records
- Songwriter(s): Sean Mbaya, James Mayer, Adio Marchant & Simeon Mclean

Kid British singles chronology
"'Leave London (EP)'" (2009)	"Sunny Days" (2009)	"'Our House Is Dadless'" (2009)

"Sunny Days" is the second single by British ska/indie band Kid British. The song was free on iTunes for a short period of time when first released.

The single was released on 20 April 2009 on CD and digital download.

== Track listing ==
1. "Sunny Days"
2. "Part Time Job/Shirt & Tie"
