= Kid British =

English 6-piece music group

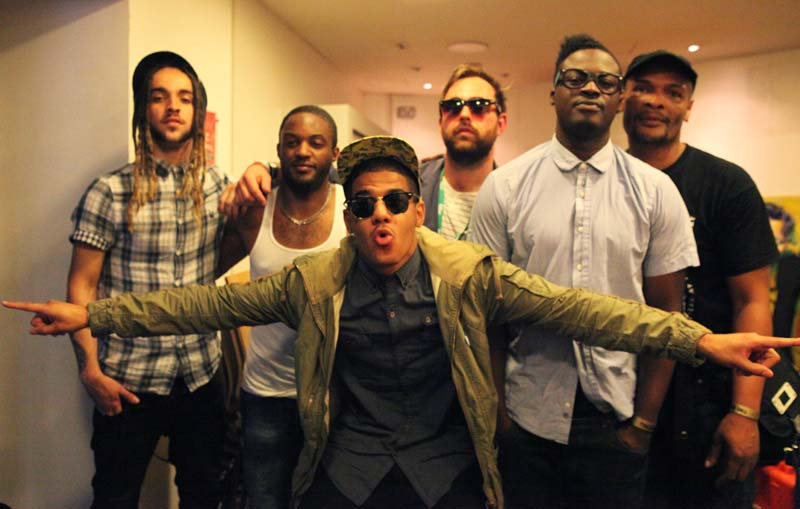
- Kid British in 2011; From left: Dominick Allen, Sean Mbaya, Simeon McLean, Matt Herod, Adio Marchant, and Mykey Wilson

Background information
- Origin: Manchester, England
- Genres: Ska, indie rock, hip hop, reggae
- Years active: 2007–2012
- Labels: Mercury, Modern English, LAB
- Past members: Adio Marchant; Sean Mbaya; Simeon McLean; James Mayer; Dominick Allen; Mykey Wilson; Matt Herod; Tom Peek
- Website: www.kidbritish.net

Kid British (often stylised as KiD BRiTiSH) was a British four-piece band, formed in Manchester, England, in 2007. The group was known for their eclectic sound inspired by indie rock, ska, and hip-hop.

The band consisted of Adio Marchant, James Mayer, Simeon McLean (all vocals), and Sean Mbaya (vocals, guitar, keyboards and saxophone). For live performances, they were joined by touring musicians Dominick Allen (vocals and rhythm guitar), Tom Peek (bass guitar), and Mykey Wilson (drums).

Adio Marchant has since embarked on his solo career as Bipolar Sunshine. His debut EP, Aesthetics, was released on 18 June 2013, and the single "Rivers" was iTunes' free single of the week, in the week commencing 14 July 2013.

== History ==
Kid British came into existence when Sean Mbaya from Prestwich (who worked as a producer under the name Kid British) worked with a band called Action Manky - made up of schoolmates Adio Marchant from Chorlton and Simeon McLean and James Mayer from Withington - who all joined forces in 2007 to form the band, initially known as Kid British & the Action Manky, but soon shortened to simply Kid British. The band signed to Mercury Records in May 2008, signed a long-term publishing deal with EMI Music Publishing in June, and released their first single "Elizabeth" (7" vinyl only) via the Another Music = Another Kitchen record label in October of that same year. Their first Mercury release followed in the form of the Leave London (10" vinyl & digital download) EP featuring the tracks "She Will Leave", "Lost in London" and "Elizabeth", which was promoted by ten "guerrilla gigs" in one day at various London tube stations, which led to the band playing an impromptu version of one of the tracks from the EP in front of Mayor Boris Johnson when they found themselves in the same train carriage.

The band received regular airplay from BBC Radio One's Chris Moyles and also played support slots for the Enemy (2007), the Specials (2009) and UB40 (2010).

The band released the single "Our House Is Dadless" on 7 July 2009, which samples the Madness song "Our House", peaking at No. 63 on the UK Singles Chart in its first week of release. The band's It Was This or Football First Half EP reached No. 67 in the UK in its first week of release, dropping out of the top 75 entirely the following week. The mooted Second Half, originally advertised within the liner notes of the First Half as being due for release in September 2009, remains unreleased, and the full twelve-track album that combined the two was not commercially released, although promotional copies were issued. In February 2010, the band announced that they were recording new tracks for the album and that it was now planned to be released in summer 2010.

The band released the single "Winner" on 28 June, less than 12 hours after the England football team's 4–1 defeat to Germany at the 2010 FIFA World Cup in South Africa, which resulted in their elimination from the first round of the bracket phase. It was their first release since being dropped by Mercury Records. It failed to reach the top 100 of the singles chart, but was featured in EA Sports' tie-in World Cup video game.

In 2011, they released an EP called Northern Stories as a free download; they also did the Northern Stories tour around Manchester, Stoke-upon-Trent, Birmingham, London, Wakefield, Leicester, Carlisle, and Oswestry.

Back with a new line-up, on 24 June 2012 they released an EP called You Can't Please Them All on LAB Records with a headline tour that followed. On 27 March 2012, it was confirmed that Kid British would support the Stone Roses at their Heaton Park concert in Manchester on 29 June 2012. It was confirmed on 29 June 2012 that Kid British would be doing an intimate UK tour called You Can't Please Them All with six dates taking place, in Glasgow, York, London, Southampton, Birmingham and the last date being in their hometown of Manchester.

A statement was released along with their final ever Kid British video for the single "You Against the World" on 17 September 2012 that they were going their separate ways, to which they cancelled three of their dates on the You Can't Please Them All tour; in Glasgow, York and Southampton for personal reasons.

Kid British played their final gig in Manchester in December 2012.

During the early part of their career, they worked with famed sound engineer and producer John Pennington, who has worked for many artists including Moby since leaving Strawberry Studios. During the last three years of their career, they took on Pete Poweron Smith as their sound engineer, who has written and produced as Big Arm, and done sound with A Certain Ratio, Lewis Watson, Bipolar Sunshine, and James Mayer.

== Musical style ==
With their witty social commentary and lively performances, Kid British were often compared to the likes of the Specials, Madness, Blur and the Streets.

The band combines indie rock, ska and hip-hop. Arwa Haider of Metro described their sound as "a very modern mishmash of styles – indie rock, R'n'B, rap, ska revival – and bring a cuddly bloke-ishness to their jaunty tunes".

== Discography ==
=== Albums ===
- It Was This or Football (2009), Mercury

=== EPs ===
- Leave London (2009), Mercury
- iTunes Live: London Festival '09 (2009), Mercury
- It Was This or Football - First Half (2009), Mercury
- Northern Stories (2011), non-label
- You Can't Please Them All (2012), LAB

=== Singles ===
- "Elizabeth" (2008), Mercury
- "Sunny Days" (2009), Mercury
- "Our House Is Dadless" (2009), Mercury
- "Winner" (2010), Modern English
- "Until Monday" (2012), LAB
- "You Against the World" (2012), LAB
