= Mickels Réa =

- Born: 28 June 1983 (age 43)
- Origin: France
- Occupations: Singer, musician and songwriter
- Instruments: Guitar, piano, bass and drums
- Years active: 2004–present
- Label: Twin Productions
- Member of: Mars Avenue
- Website: [www.marsavenue.com]

Mickels Rea, born 28 June 1983 in Charleville-Mézières, is a French singer-songwriter, best known as the winner of the Star Academy 8.

== Biography ==
Mickels Rea studied music at the École Nationale de Musique et de Danse de Charleville-Mézières and for 9 years, he learnt music theory, harmony, guitar and vocals.

In 1999, aged 16, he won the contest Chantons sur la foire in Charleville-Mézières, which allowed him to record his first single and to represent France at the International Festival of Mangalia, Romania.

He later spent three years studying at the vocal school of Alice Dona in Paris.

In 2004, he was part of the cast of the musical Les Enfants du Soleil created by Alexandre Arcady and Didier Barbelivien, where he played the role of Farid, the son of Harki.

In 2008, Mickels was the victor of the eighth season of Star Academy France, a popular television reality-show and musical competition. During the show, he sang with Lenny Kravitz, Johnny Hallyday, Seal, Keane, Laura Pausini, Jason Mraz, Christophe Maé and Rihanna. On 19 December 2008 he was announced the series winner with 52.2% of the votes. The prize was an advance of 500,000 euros and a contract with record label Universal Music to record an album. Mickels starts working on his album with his band Mars Avenue.

In the spring of 2011, Mickels and Mars Avenue start touring: they perform in various venues in Paris and its surroundings. Later this year, they part company with Mercury and start working on a new album which will include more songs in English. In January 2012 they perform at La Boule Noire and le Sentier des Halles (Paris) with singer/actress Jane Badler, best known for her role in the popular series "V".

Preceded by Quentin Mosimann	Winner of Star Academy France; 2008	Succeeded by Laurène Bourvon
