= Cyril Cinélu =

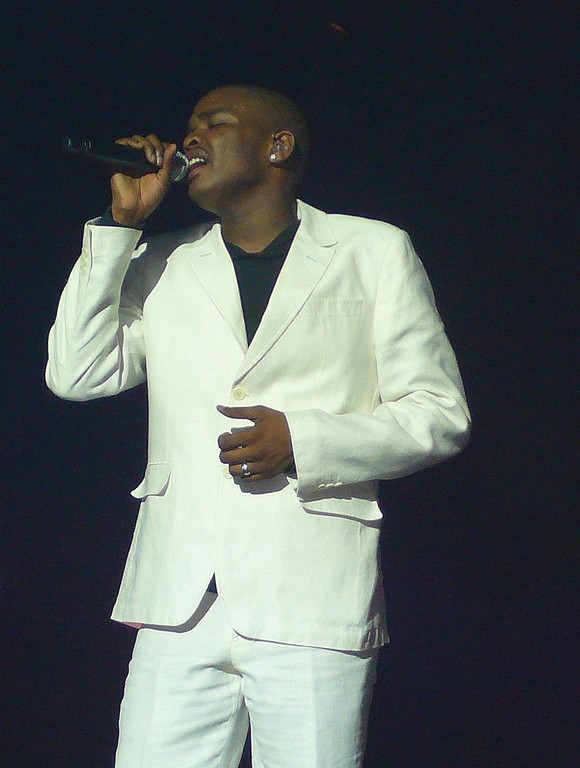

Background information
- Born: 23 January 1987 (age 39); Lagny-sur-Marne, France
- Origin: Paris, France
- Instrument: Voice
- Years active: Since 2006
- Label: Mercury/Universal Music
- Website: Official myspace

Cyril Cinélu, born 23 January 1987 in Lagny-sur-Marne, is a Francophone singer originally from Martinique who won the sixth season of Star Academy on 22 December 2006.

== Biography ==
Cyril grew up in Dillon, Martinique. While little, other children made fun of him due to his "androgynous voice". He has been a singer since the age of eight. After finishing high school at the age of 16 and obtaining his degree in English, he participated in the sixth season of Star Academy in 2006, in which he was the winner.

A year later saw the release of his first album titled Jusqu'à moi. The sales of the album were far below those of previous winners of Star Academy. In the first week, the album failed to reach the French top 100 in sales, though in Belgium his single Quelque chose qui m'appartient fared better peaking at 15 in the new year week of 2008.

On 28 August 2010, may be seen in the auditions for the seventh season of The X Factor aired on ITV and obtained three yes from the jury that allows him to qualify for the rest of the show but is eliminated by the jury in the "Boot-Camp".

During late 2011 to the middle of 2012, Cyril worked as a PSHE and French teacher at Royal Liberty School for boys, in Gidea Park, Romford, Essex.

Cyril now lives in France where he still teaches and performs in private events.

== Discography ==
=== With Star Academy ===
==== Albums ====
- 2006: Y'a qu'un cheveu
- 2006: La Star Ac' chante Polnareff
- 2006: Le plein de tubes

==== Singles ====
- 2006: Porque te vas

=== Solo career ===
==== Albums ====
- 2004: Zoukamine Futurstar (compilation album)
- 2007: Jusqu'à moi

==== Singles ====
- 2004: Rêve
- 2006: Délit d'amour + "Life"
- 2007: Quelque chose qui m'appartient

== Sources ==
Preceded by Magalie Vaé	Winner of Star Academy France; 2007	Succeeded by Quentin Mosimann
