= Tiny Dancer (Hold Me Closer) =

Single by Ironik featuring Chipmunk and Elton John

from the album No Point in Wasting Tears
- Released: 27 April 2009
- Recorded: 2008
- Genre: R&B, hip-hop
- Length: 3:23
- Label: Warner, Asylum
- Songwriters: Elton John, Bernie Taupin, Ironik
- Producer: Simon Franglen

Ironik singles chronology
"I Wanna Be Your Man" (2008)	"Tiny Dancer (Hold Me Closer)" (2009)	"I Got Soul" (2009)

Chipmunk singles chronology
"Chip Diddy Chip" (2009)	"Tiny Dancer (Hold Me Closer)" (2009)	"Diamond Rings" (2009)

Elton John singles chronology
"Joseph, Better You than Me" (2008)	"Tiny Dancer (Hold Me Closer)" (2009)	"If It Wasn't Bad" (2010)

"Tiny Dancer (Hold Me Closer)" is a song by British rapper Ironik featuring fellow British rapper Chipmunk, from his debut album No Point in Wasting Tears, released on 11 May 2009. The song heavily samples Elton John's 1972 single "Tiny Dancer".

== Music video ==
The video features both Ironik and Chipmunk while Elton John is played on TV screens in the background. The video is completely black and white. It begins with Ironik and Chipmunk walking down a hotel corridor in suits on the way to a room. They knock on their room and are let in by a woman dressed in a bodysuit and stockings. The video unfolds with Ironik and Chipmunk dancing and flirting with a group of similarly dressed women.

== Formats track listing ==
CD single

1. "Tiny Dancer (Hold Me Closer)" (Radio edit) – 3:23
2. "Tiny Dancer (Hold Me Closer)" (Fraser T Smith remix) – 3:18

Digital download

1. "Tiny Dancer (Hold Me Closer)" (Radio edit) – 3:23
2. "Tiny Dancer (Hold Me Closer)" (TreMoreFire remix) – 6:18
3. "Tiny Dancer (Hold Me Closer)" (TRC remix) – 4:35
4. "Tiny Dancer (Hold Me Closer)" (Fraser T Smith remix) – 3:18

== Charts and certifications ==
=== Weekly charts ===
Chart (2009)	Peak position
Australia (ARIA)	41
Ireland (IRMA)	17
UK R&B (Official Charts Company)	2
UK Singles (OCC)	3

Chart (2013)	Peak position
UK Singles (OCC)	76

=== Year-end charts ===
Chart (2009)	Position
UK Singles (OCC)	93

=== Certifications ===
Region	Certification	Certified units/sales
United Kingdom (BPI)	Silver	345,000

== Release history ==
Date	Country	Formats	Label
27 April 2009	United Kingdom	CD single, digital download	Warner/Asylum
