= Esmée Denters discography =

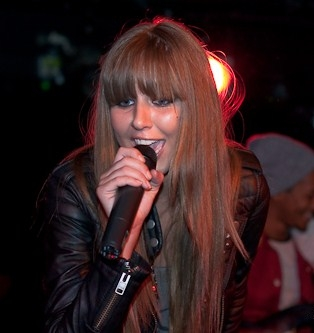
- Denters performing live in 2009
- Studio albums: 1
- Extended plays: 3
- Singles: 20
- Promotional singles: 1
- As featured artist: 3

Dutch singer Esmée Denters has released one studio album, three extended plays (EP) and twenty singles (including three as featured artist). Denters rose to prominence after posting song covers on YouTube, which gained the attention of American singer Justin Timberlake who signed her to his record label Tennman Records in 2007. In November of the same year, she released the promotional single "Crazy Place".

Her debut single "Outta Here" was released in 2009. It peaked at number two on the Dutch Single Top 100 and within the top ten in the United Kingdom and on the US Billboard Dance Club Songs chart. The song was certified gold in New Zealand and silver in the United Kingdom. Denters's debut studio album, Outta Here (2009), peaked at number five in the Netherlands. Two more singles were released off the album–"Admit It" (2009) and "Love Dealer" (2010)–the latter becoming Denters's second song to peak in the top ten of the Dance Club Songs chart. In 2010, Denters featured on Chipmunk's "Until You Were Gone". The single became Denters's highest-peaking song in the United Kingdom, reaching number three and further being certified silver. She was also a featured artist on "Life Without You" (2010) by Stanfour, which charted in German-speaking countries.

In 2012, Denters was dropped from Timberlake's label. In the same year, 3 Beat Records released her single "It's Summer Because We Say So", credited under the mononym Esmée. Alongside The New Velvet in April 2013, Denters released the collaborative EP From Holland to Hillside. Also in 2013, she joined other Dutch artists to perform "Koningslied" as a gift for King Willem-Alexander. It debuted at number one on the Dutch Single Top 100. Her 2014 single "If I Could I Would" was released independently. Denters announced in 2015 that she planned to release an EP but would require funds via crowdfunding on the music platform PledgeMusic. The project did not materialise as the goal was not met. She later issued two EPs independently, These Days (2017) and These Days, Pt. 2 (2018).

== Albums ==
List of studio albums, with selected chart positions and sales figures
| Title | Details | Peak chart positions | | | Sales |
| Title | Details | NLD | BEL (Vl) | UK | Sales |
|---|---|---|---|---|---|
| Outta Here | Released: 22 May 2009; Label: Tennman Records; Format: CD, digital download, streaming | 5 | 55 | 48 | US: ~1,000 (Note: United States sales figures for Outta Here as of February 2012.) |

== Extended plays ==
List of extended plays
| Title | Details |
|---|---|
| From Holland to Hillside (with The New Velvet) | Released: 16 April 2013; Label: Independent; Format: Digital download, streaming |
| These Days | Released: 20 October 2017; Label: Independent; Format: Digital download, streaming |
| These Days, Pt. 2 | Released: 25 May 2018; Label: Independent; Format: Digital download, streaming |

== Singles ==
=== As lead artist ===
List of singles as lead artist, with selected chart positions and certifications
| Title | Year | Peak chart positions | | | | | | | | | Certifications | Album |
| Title | Year | NLD | BEL (Vl) | BEL (Wa) | EUR | IRE | NZL | ROU | UK | US Dance | Certifications | Album |
|---|---|---|---|---|---|---|---|---|---|---|---|---|
| "Outta Here" | 2009 | 2 | 26 | — (Note: "Outta Here" did not enter the Ultratop 50 Singles chart, but peaked at number three on the Ultratip chart.) | 24 | 18 | 12 | 98 | 7 | 9 | BPI: Silver; RMNZ: Gold | Outta Here |
| "Admit It" | 2009 | 53 | — | — | — | — | — | — | 56 | — | | Outta Here |
| "Love Dealer" (featuring Justin Timberlake) | 2010 | 32 | — (Note: "Love Dealer" did not enter the Ultratop 50 Singles chart, but peaked at number three on the Ultratip chart.) | — | — | — | — | — | 68 | 9 | | Outta Here |
| "It's Summer Because We Say So" (as Esmée) | 2012 | — | — | — | — | — | — | — | — | — | | Non-album singles |
| "If I Could I Would" | 2014 | — | — | — | — | — | — | — | — | — | | Non-album singles |
| "Get Home" (with Shaun Reynolds) | 2017 | — | — | — | — | — | — | — | — | — | | Non-album singles |
| "Motivation" (with Shaun Reynolds) | 2017 | — | — | — | — | — | — | — | — | — | | These Days |
| "Feeling Good" | 2018 | — | — | — | — | — | — | — | — | — | | These Days, Pt. 2 |
| "Moonchild" | 2019 | — | — | — | — | — | — | — | — | — | | Non-album singles |
| "Love Me the Same" | 2020 | — | — | — | — | — | — | — | — | — | | Non-album singles |
| "Ruins" | 2020 | — | — | — | — | — | — | — | — | — | | Non-album singles |
| "Better Things" | 2020 | — | — | — | — | — | — | — | — | — | | Non-album singles |
| "Regenerate" | 2020 | — | — | — | — | — | — | — | — | — | | Non-album singles |
| "Minimalist" | 2021 | — | — | — | — | — | — | — | — | — | | Non-album singles |
| "To the Grave" | 2021 | — | — | — | — | — | — | — | — | — | | Non-album singles |
| "Beauty in Everything" | 2021 | — | — | — | — | — | — | — | — | — | | Non-album singles |
"—" denotes a single that did not chart or was not released in that territory.

=== As featured artist ===
List of singles as featured artist, with selected chart positions and certifications
| Title | Year | Peak chart positions | | | | | | | | Certifications | Album |
| Title | Year | NLD | AUS | AUT | EUR | GER | IRE | SWI | UK | Certifications | Album |
|---|---|---|---|---|---|---|---|---|---|---|---|
| "Until You Were Gone" (Chipmunk featuring Esmée Denters) | 2010 | — | 41 | — | 17 | — | 24 | — | 3 | BPI: Silver | I Am Chipmunk (Note: "Until You Were Gone" is only included on the Platinum edition of I Am Chipmunk.) |
| "Life Without You" (Stanfour featuring Esmée Denters) | 2010 | — | — | 49 | — | 25 | — | 58 | — | | Rise and Fall |
| "Dance4life" (Erik Arbores featuring Esmée Denters) | 2012 | — (Note: "Dance4life" did not enter the Dutch Top 100 chart, but peaked at number fourteen on the Dutch Dance Top 30 chart.) | — | — | — | — | — | — | — | | Non-album single |
"—" denotes an album that did not chart or was not released in that territory.

=== Promotional singles ===
List of promotional singles
| Title | Year | Album |
|---|---|---|
| "Crazy Place" | 2007 | Outta Here (Note: "Crazy Place" is only included on the American and Canadian editions of Outta Here.) |

=== Other singles ===
List of other singles, with selected chart positions
| Title | Year | Peak chart positions | |
| Title | Year | NLD | BEL (Vl) |
|---|---|---|---|
| "Koningslied" (as part of Nationaal Comité Inhuldiging) | 2013 | 1 | 41 |

=== Guest appearances ===
List of guest appearances
| Title | Year | Album |
|---|---|---|
| "10 dagen" (Ronnie Flex featuring Esmée Denters) | 2021 | Altijd Samen |
