= Matt Morris (musician) =

American singer-songwriter (born 1979)

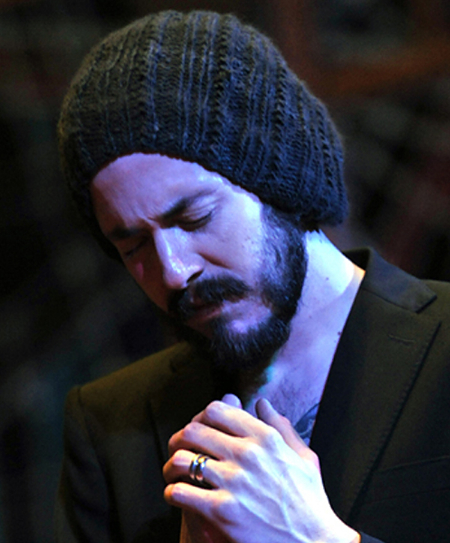
- Morris performing at SXSW in 2010

Background information
- Born: Matthew Burton Morris; May 9, 1979 (age 47); Denver, Colorado, U.S.
- Genres: Alternative rock; pop
- Occupations: Singer; songwriter; record producer; multi-instrumentalist
- Instruments: Vocals; guitar; piano; bass
- Years active: 1991–present
- Label: Tennman
- Spouse: Sean Michael Morris (m. 2008; div. 2022)
- Website: www.mattmorris.net

Matthew David Morris (born Matthew Burton Morris on May 9, 1979) is an American singer, songwriter, record producer, and former Episcopal priest. He has released solo projects on Tennman/Interscope Records, but is best known for his work as a songwriter and producer for a variety of artists, including Joy Williams, Justin Timberlake, Christina Aguilera, Kelly Clarkson, Reba McEntire, Mary J. Blige, Sarah McLachlan, Kimbra, and Cher.

He achieved early success when he appeared on the Disney Channel television series The All New Mickey Mouse Club (MMC) in the early 1990s, where he was a cast member from 1991 to 1995 (seasons 4–7). Morris' January 2010 performance of Leonard Cohen's "Hallelujah" with Justin Timberlake and Charlie Sexton on the "Hope for Haiti Now" telethon became the most downloaded song from the international broadcast's digital release and went to No. 1 on the iTunes music chart and No. 13 on the Billboard Hot 100.

== Early life ==
Matt Morris was born and reared in Denver, Colorado by his mother and stepfather, and had no intention of being a country singer like his father, Gary Morris, an American country music artist who charted a string of countrypolitan-styled hit songs throughout the 1980s. However, Morris learned much about songwriting from his father, Gary.

Morris's biological parents divorced while he was still an infant. Morris was raised in Denver by his mother Teri Hernandez, and his stepfather Ken. They lived in the Barnum neighborhood of Denver until Morris was in the fourth grade, when they moved to Bear Valley.

In 1991, when Morris was in sixth grade, he joined the cast of The All New Mickey Mouse Club. Fellow castmates included future collaborators and pop superstars Justin Timberlake, Christina Aguilera, Britney Spears, Ryan Gosling, Keri Russell, and JC Chasez. His other castmates included Nikki Deloach, Rhona Bennett, and Chasen Hampton. The show ended in 1995. Morris returned to his home in Denver, Colorado with the intention of distancing himself from the entertainment industry and reconnecting with his friends and family. Morris attended John F. Kennedy High School and starred in a number of high school plays, including South Pacific and The King and I.

Morris grew up in an Episcopalian household.

== Musical career ==
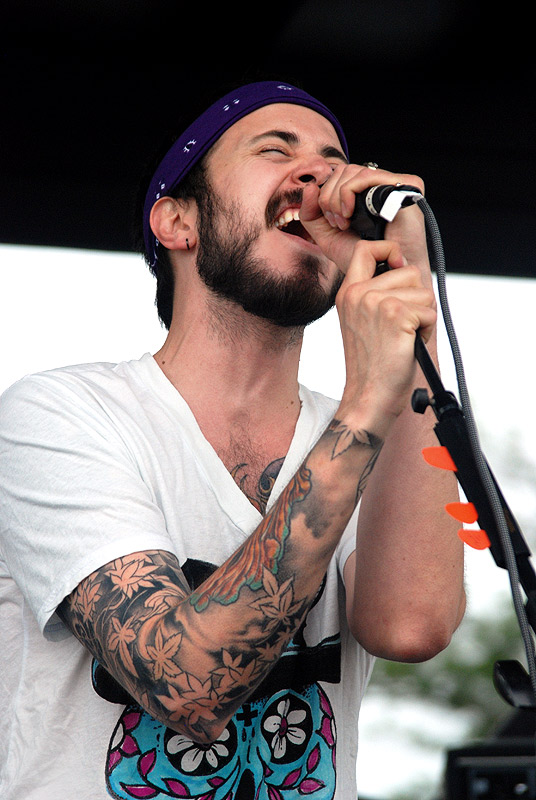
Morris performing at Bonnaroo in June 2008

He is the son of country music star Gary Morris. He achieved early success when he appeared on the Disney Channel television series The All New Mickey Mouse Club in the early 1990s, where he was a cast member from 1991 to 1995 (seasons 4–7). There he met future collaborators Justin Timberlake and Christina Aguilera, along with future celebrities Britney Spears, Ryan Gosling, Keri Russell, and JC Chasez. Morris first experienced success as a songwriter in the early 2000s. Morris collaborated with Aguilera on her 2002 RCA Records, "Stripped", co-writing five songs with Aguilera and producer Scott Storch, including the hit "Can't Hold Us Down". Another of their collaborations, "Miss Independent", went on to become a number one hit for American Idol winner, Kelly Clarkson. Morris continued his success in songwriting by co-writing with Timberlake the song "Another Song (All Over Again)" for Timberlake's second solo album, FutureSex/LoveSounds (2006). The track was produced by Rick Rubin, and the album debuted at number one on the Billboard 200 chart. Morris co-wrote with Timberlake a song for Reba McEntire's Reba: Duets album, which McEntire sang with Timberlake. Morris co-wrote the song "Woman's World", the first single from Cher's album Closer to the Truth (2013).

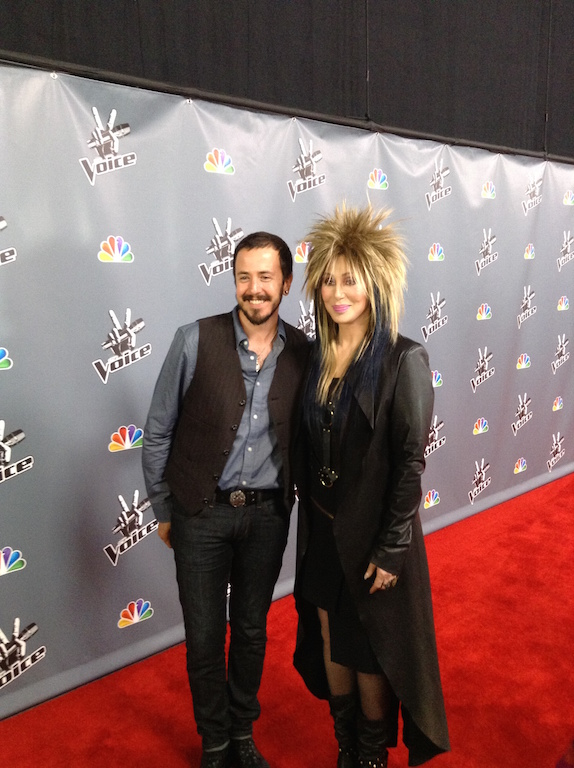
Morris and Cher on Red Carpet

Morris' January 2010 performance of Leonard Cohen's "Hallelujah" with Justin Timberlake and Charlie Sexton on the Hope For Haiti Now telethon became the most downloaded song from the international broadcast's digital release and went to No. 1 on the iTunes music chart and No. 13 on the Billboard Hot 100 During the same month, Morris released When Everything Breaks Open on Timberlake's Tennman Records. The release gained wide distribution through Interscope Records, garnering much praise in the press. Morris was let go from his deal with Tennman and Interscope in 2011, and continues to write songs for other recording artists.

=== UnSpoken ===
In 2003, Morris released the independent album UnSpoken. To promote the album, Morris toured colleges around the United States and gave an interactive session and dialogue with audiences called "Reflections on Artistry and the Business of Music: A Dialogue with Matt Morris." The event consisted of a discussion of Morris' experiences in the music industry, as well as his thoughts about file sharing.

=== Backstage at Bonnaroo and Other Acoustic Performances EP ===
Morris performed at the 2008 Bonnaroo Music Festival. While at the festival, Morris and producer, Charlie Sexton, recorded a series of acoustic performances backstage in the Music Allies recording studio. The songs were compiled as the 5 song EP, Backstage at Bonnaroo and Other Acoustic Performances, and released by Tennman Records September 23, 2008.

=== When Everything Breaks Open ===
On January 12, 2010, Morris released When Everything Breaks Open on Justin Timberlake's label, Tennman Records. In support of the album, Morris performed on a number of television shows, including the Late Show with David Letterman, The Ellen DeGeneres Show, and Lopez Tonight. When Everything Breaks Open was co-produced by Charlie Sexton and Justin Timberlake. The album was recorded largely at Public Hi-Fi, a recording studio in Austin, Texas founded by Spoon's Jim Eno.

Chart (2010)	Peak Position
Billboard 200 (United States)	99
Billboard Top Independent Albums	13
Billboard Top Rock Albums	31
Billboard Top Alternative Albums	25

=== Hallelujah ===
On January 22, 2010, Morris performed the Leonard Cohen song, "Hallelujah", with Justin Timberlake and Charlie Sexton during the Hope For Haiti Now telethon. The recording of the song became the most downloaded track from the album, and it charted in the top 20 of the Billboard Hot 100 chart.

=== Live Forever video ===
The first video from When Everything Breaks Open was for the song, "Live Forever". The video was directed by Matt Stawski, with art by Serge Gay, Jr.. The video takes place in a non-descript suburban neighborhood and is rich with animation.

=== Shlomo ===
Morris was offered the lead role alongside India.Arie in a Broadway production produced by Daniel Wise entitled "Shlomo". The musical is based on the life of Shlomo Carlebach, also known as the Singing Rabbi.

== Songwriter credits ==
=== 2002 ===
- "Can't Hold Us Down", "Walk Away", "Infatuation", "Loving Me 4 Me", "Underappreciated" on Christina Aguilera's Stripped

=== 2003 ===
- "Miss Independent" on Kelly Clarkson's Thankful

=== 2006 ===
- "(Another Song) All Over Again" Justin Timberlake's FutureSex/LoveSounds

=== 2007 ===
- "The Only Promise That Remains" on Reba McEntire's Reba: Duets

=== 2011 ===
- "Need Someone" on Mary J. Blige's My Life II... The Journey Continues (Act 1)

=== 2012 ===
- "Woman's World" on Cher's Closer to the Truth.

=== 2014 ===
- Love in High Places – Kimbra
- Song for My Father – Sarah Mclachlan
- Love Beside Me – Sarah Mclachlan
- 90s Music – Kimbra
- 90s Music M Phazes Remix – Kimbra
- Broken Over You – Grace Mitchell
- Little Secret – Nikki Yanofsky

=== 2015 ===
- Stand By You – Rachel Platten
- Woman (Oh Mama) – Joy Williams
- Love Beside Me – Joy Williams
- One Day I Will – Joy Williams
- What A Good Woman Does – Joy Williams
- Welcome Home – Joy Williams
- Till Forever – Joy Williams
- You Loved Me – Joy Williams
- Sweet Love of Mine – Joy Williams
- Dying Kind – Joy Williams
- Call – Francesco Yates
- Better To Be Loved – Francesco Yates
- Me & My Girls – Selena Gomez

== Performance credits ==
=== 2010 ===
- performed "Hallelujah" live with Justin Timberlake and Charlie Sexton. "Hallelujah" was written by Canadian singer-songwriter Leonard Cohen and released on Cohen's seventh studio album, Various Positions (1984).
- featured on "Infatuation" by Flobots. "Infatuation" is co-written by Morris and included on Flobots second studio album, Survival Story (2010).

== Ordained ministry ==
After graduating summa cum laude and receiving the award of Masters Student of the Year from Iliff School of Theology, Morris was ordained an episcopal priest on May 9, 2020, at Trinity Cathedral in Portland, Oregon by The Rt. Rev. Michael Joseph Hanley, 10th bishop of the Episcopal Diocese of Oregon. Morris served in multiple roles in the Episcopal Diocese of Oregon, including short-term interim priest at All Saints Episcopal Church in the summer of 2020, campus minister for Beloved Community on Campus, and video resource specialist on Bishop Hanley's staff at the start of the COVID-19 pandemic.

On the 3rd anniversary of his ordination to the priesthood, Morris submitted a letter to his bishop requesting release and removal from ordained ministry in The Episcopal Church, a process outlined in Canon III.9.9 of the Constitution and Canons of the Episcopal Church. Morris cited that the church "is less than fluent in relationships that fall outside of a heteronormative, monogamous-oriented framework, particularly if those relationships are not headed toward marriage, as the church conceives of it," and that this was one reason for requesting release. Additionally, Morris explained that ordained ministry diminished his sense of creativity and musicality. Morris was granted release on June 1, 2023, by The Rt. Rev. Diana Akiyama.

== Personal life ==
Morris is gay, and was married to Sean Michael Morris in 2008. The two divorced in 2022.

Morris blogged about his religious journey under the name Teo Bishop from 2009 to 2014, and in 2012, he changed his legal name to Teo Bishop. He changed his name back to Matthew in 2014.

== Discography ==
- 2003: UnSpoken
- 2008: Backstage at Bonnaroo and other Acoustic Performances EP
- 2010: When Everything Breaks Open
