= Rise (Flobots song) =

Single by Flobots

from the album Fight with Tools
- Released: (United States) August, 2008 (United Kingdom) December 1, 2008
- Genre: Alternative rock, rap rock
- Length: 4:13
- Label: Universal Republic

Flobots singles chronology
"Handlebars" (2008)	"Rise" (2008)	"White Flag Warrior" (2010)

Music video
- "Rise" on YouTube

"Rise" is the second single released by the alternative hip hop group Flobots from Denver, Colorado. It was released from Flobots' album Fight with Tools.

== Track listing ==
CD

1. "Rise (Edit)" - 3:20
2. "Rise (Edit 2)" - 3:40

Play.com (UK Maxi) (MP3 EP)

1. "Rise (Album Version)" - 4:13
2. "Handlebars (BBC Acoustic)" - 3:35
3. "Happy Together" - 4:00
4. "Rise (BBC Acoustic)" - 4:12

== Music video ==
The Flobots filmed a music video for this song on July 6, 2008, at the Gothic theater In Denver, Colorado. The video shows a rock concert intermixed with scenes of pro-American posters and people working to make the world a better place, such as planting trees and committing random acts of kindness. The video features almost everyone in some form of American Flag bandanna, much like the cover for Flobot's album "Fight with Tools." In the video, multiple references are made to the website americawillbe.org, a pro-peace website dedicated to the visions of what people want USA to be.

== Chart performance ==
On September 13, 2008, "Rise" charted on the Billboard Hot Modern Rock Tracks at number 36. The song peaked at number 33.

Chart (2008)	Peak position
U.S. Billboard Hot Modern Rock Tracks	33
