= Shaun Reynolds =

Shaun Reynolds may refer to:

- Shaun Reynolds (musician), English musician
- Shaun Reynolds (rugby union) (born 1995), South African rugby union player
