= Ebony Day =

British singer

- Born: Ebony Day; 21 March 1993 (age 33); London, England, UK
- Occupations: YouTuber, Singer, Songwriter
- Years active: 2009–present
- Website: www.youtube.com/user/ebonyday1

Ebony Day (born 21 March 1993) is an English singer, songwriter and YouTube personality living in London, England. In 2013 Ebony won MTV's Brand New Artist competition.

== Career ==
On 14 December 2009, Ebony uploaded her first cover onto YouTube which was a cover of Jason Derulo's "Whatcha Say". As she began uploading an increasing amount of music covers, her view count kept getting bigger and her fan base kept growing. By December the following year, Ebony had racked up over 20,000 subscribers, this was when Ebony really started to create her own platform on YouTube and began collaborating with other artists.

On 8 October, Ebony uploaded a video letting her audience know that she was moving from England to Australia and began to collaborate with Australian musicians. Whilst in Australia Ebony reached 100,000 subscribers on her main YouTube channel.

2012 was one of the biggest years for this girl from England. In June 2012 Ebony performed at Stoke 2012 Live alongside artists like Rizzle Kicks and The Saturdays. In July she travelled to America to attend Teen Hoot, an event for up and coming artists. July also marked the first video in which Ebony collaborated with fellow British musician Shaun Reynolds. On 29 September of that year, Ebony released her first EP 'The Beginning'.

In late 2012, Ebony was shortlisted in MTV's Brand New Artist competition to win a chance to perform at their MTV showcase. In early 2013, Ebony was named the winner of the competition.

In September she posted the music video for her song 'Brush You off My Heart' which is on her EP 'The Beginning'.

In 2014, Ebony continued to post music covers, usually produced by her friend Shaun Reynolds. She supported Boyce Avenue on the UK leg of their tour for five dates from the 6th till 13 April. On 19 July, Ebony performed at Pop Shack Live in London's Indigo at The O2 Arena, alongside Union J and others.

Ebony is now concentrating on songwriting and has a YouTube fan base of over 300,000 subscribers.

== Personal life ==
Day and her then-fiancé David Gibbs welcomed their first child, a daughter named Daisy Grace on 22 January 2018, and welcomed their second child, a son named Hudson James on 5 November 2019. In May 2023, Day confirmed that her and Gibbs had separated.
