= Esmée Denters =

Dutch singer and YouTuber (born 1988)

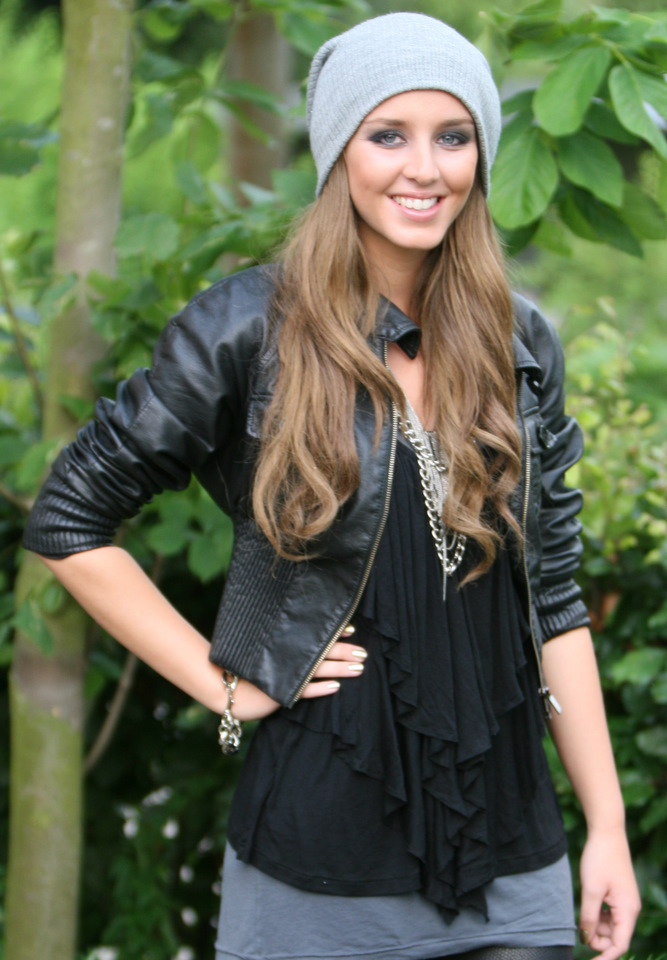
- Denters in 2009

Background information
- Born: 28 September 1988 (age 37); Arnhem, Netherlands
- Genres: Pop; R&B
- Occupations: Singer; songwriter; YouTuber
- Instruments: Vocals; keyboard; guitar
- Years active: 2006–present
- Label: Tennman
- Website: esmeedenters.com

YouTube information
- Channel: esmeedenters
- Years active: 2006–present
- Genres: Music; vlogs
- Subscribers: 270 thousand
- Views: 80.6 million
- Last updated: 25 April 2026

Esmée Denters (born 28 September 1988) is a Dutch singer and YouTuber. Denters started promoting herself as a musician online in 2006, covering songs by artists including Justin Timberlake and Natasha Bedingfield. Denters was signed by Timberlake as the first artist to his label Tennman Records. In May 2009, she released her debut studio album, Outta Here, and toured the United States with Timberlake. After the label dropped her, Denters moved to London, where she competed in BBC One's The Voice UK.

In 2017, Denters released her EP These Days, followed by the EP Past, Present, Future in 2020.

== Early life ==
Denters was born on 28 September 1988, in Arnhem. Denters lived in Westervoort next to Arnhem until she was fifteen, when her family moved to Oosterbeek, Gelderland. She graduated from high school in Arnhem in 2006 and subsequently attended the HAN University of Applied Sciences where she was working towards a Bachelor of Social Work until she dropped out in her first year in February 2007 to join Tennman Records.

== Career ==
=== 2006–2008: Early career ===
On 25 August 2006, Denters made a YouTube channel. She posted several videos of herself singing covers of other pop stars' songs. Denters traveled to the U.S. to write songs and record in the studio. There were plans for a reality show around Denters in the United States, which followed up the release of her debut album. She also sang a song that was written by Kelly Rowland of Destiny's Child. She then flew to Sweden for a few days to write songs and record.

In 2008, Denters started her professional career after attracting the attention of Dutch media scouts and American pop singer Justin Timberlake. Timberlake went on to sign her as the first artist to his label Tennman Records. Timberlake served as an executive producer on her debut album, Outta Here.

She also appeared on TV shows like Oprah.

=== 2009–2010:Outta Here and collaborations ===
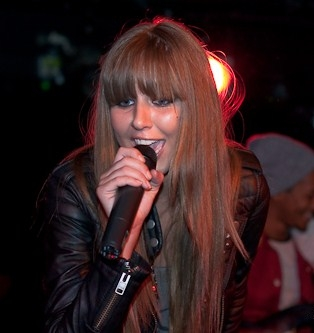
Denters performing live in October 2009

In April 2009, Denters confirmed on Dutch radio station Radio 538 that her debut album would be released in the Netherlands on 22 May 2009, also confirming that the album is a mix of Pop and R&B with both ballads, and uptempo tracks. Her debut single, also the title song of the album, was released in the Netherlands on 14 April 2009 and in the UK on 15 August. Outta Here reached number five in the Netherlands and charted in Belgium, where it reached number 3 for five weeks on the Flemish Region Albums Chart. The album was released in the UK on 11 January 2010 and features her 2008 charity duet with Timberlake, "Follow My Lead" as an additional bonus song. The second single, "Admit It", only reached 28 in the Netherlands and 56 in the UK.

In autumn 2009, Denters went on tour with Honor Society. The album's third single "Love Dealer" reached 12 and 68 in the Netherlands and UK respectively.

Denters also worked on several collaborations during this time. She performed on tour with artists Ne-Yo, Enrique Iglesias and N-Dubz. She lent her vocals to the German band Stanfour who featured Denters on their single "Life Without You", released on 25 May 2010. The music video for the single was postponed due to the April 2010 Icelandic volcano eruption. On 1 May, Denters and Stanfour flew to New York to record the video for "Life Without You". The official release of "Life Without You" in Germany was 28 May. The video leaked on the internet on 24 May. In the UK, she also accepted a collaboration with British rapper Chipmunk on his hit "Until You Were Gone", which entered the top three on UK charts.

She received an MTV Europe Music Award in 2009 and the European Border Breakers Award in 2010 for Outta Love.

=== 2011–2014: Dismissal from Tennman Records ===
Denters started working on new songs for her second studio album in January 2011. She worked with British DJ and producer K-Gee and musician Ben Cullum on the album, which was to be titled Screaming Out Loud. "City Lights" was the first single from the album.

At the end of 2012, Dutch DJ and producer Erik Arbores and Denters collaborated for the new Dance4Life theme song called "dance4life (now dance)", released digitally on 23 November. They performed the song at the Dance4Life 2012 charity event in Ahoy, Rotterdam. Denters was dropped from Tennman Records that year.

On 24 February 2014, Denters returned to the stage, performing new music at Showcase Live in London. She opened the show singing her first hit single "Outta Here" followed by three new original songs: "Cars and Airplanes", "If I Could I Would" and "Anything For The Money", along with a performance of Lorde's "Royals", Drake's "Hold On, We're Going Home", and Avicii's "Wake Me Up".

On 24 September 2014, Denters released her first independent single "If I Could I Would" on iTunes and Spotify.

=== 2015–present: The Voice UK and independent work ===
On 24 January 2015, Denters appeared on BBC One's The Voice UK, selected to join will.i.am's team for the next round. However, she was eliminated at the knockout stage.

At the end of 2017, Denters worked with Shaun Reynolds and released a 5-song EP These Days on iTunes and Spotify. In January 2018, Denters mentioned on Instagram that the second part of the EP would be released in May 2018. On 25 May 2018, Denters sang the lead single "Feeling Good" live on the Dutch TV show M. One month later Denters headlined her own live show at the Melkweg in The Netherlands. Sylvia Aimee and MVTCHES were the opening acts. A second live show followed in March 2019 at The Borderline in London.

In 2020, Denters released a 3-song EP titled Past, Present, Future. The EP was created during the UK lockdown with Shaun Reynolds, who said they "managed to piece [it] together remotely from two opposite sides of the capital". The EP includes the tracks "Love Me The Same", "Ruins", and "Better Things", with each song depicting a different period of time in a romantic relationship.

== Media ==
Appearances in the Dutch and international media.

Appearances in the media

| Year | Media | Country | Notes |
|---|---|---|---|
| 2006 | Het Land van Maas en Geel | The Netherlands | Interview |
| 2007 | De Wereld Draait Door | The Netherlands | Interview |
| 2007 | Unknown | Norway | Interview |
| 2007 | Jensen! | The Netherlands | Interview and scoop signing at Tennman Records |
| 2007 | Oprah | The United States | Interview |
| 2008 | YouTube (Justin Bieber) | The United States | Justin Bieber sings for Esmee Denters |
| 2009 | Radio 538 Evers Staat Op | The Netherlands | Music promotion 'Outta Here' |
| 2009 | De Wereld Draait Door | The Netherlands | Interview & Music promotion 'Outta Here' |
| 2009 | Van Der Vorst Ziet Sterren | The Netherlands | Interview |
| 2009 | Ados | France | Interview |
| 2009 | TMF Awards 2009 | The Netherlands | Singing 'Outta Here' & Awards winner |
| 2009 | PunchBowl TV | The United States | Interview |
| 2010 | The Netherlands Helps Haiti | The Netherlands | Charity I'll Be There' with Trijntje Oosterhuis & Waylon |
| 2010 | ET | The United States | Interview with Justin Timberlake / Behind the scenes 'Love Dealer' |
| 2010 | GMTV | The United Kingdom | Interview with Chipmunk |
| 2010 | Radio 538 Koninginnedag | The Netherlands | Singing 'Outta Here' & Interview |
| 2010 | Iheartradio | The United States | Interview / Behind the scenes 'Love Dealer' |
| 2013–2015 | Ont' Sofa Gibson Sessions | The United Kingdom | Music promotion 'If I Could I Would' and multiple covers (one together with Fabian Belassie) |
| 2015 | The Voice UK (series 4) | The United Kingdom | Participant, Team Will.I.Am & eliminated in the knockouts |
| 2015 | RTL Late Night | The Netherlands | Interview |
| 2015 | RTL Late Night | The Netherlands | Music promotion 'Lean On' with Ronald Molendijk |
| 2016 | YouTube (Esmee Denters) | The Netherlands | The Road To Ahoy part 1–6 |
| 2016 | RTL Late Night | The Netherlands | Retrospective YouTube |
| 2018 | M | The Netherlands | Interview & music promotion 'Feeling Good' with Thijs Boontjes Dance- and show-orchestra |
| 2020 | The Voice UK (10 years) | The United Kingdom | Retrospective The Voice UK (Season 4) |
| 2021 | 3FM | The Netherlands | Interview |

== YouTube ==
The uploaded YouTube videos from Esmee Denters can be found below. A video appears on the list if it is a song, it reached more than 100,000 views on YouTube, is not an official released single, not part of a TV show and cannot be found on an album.

YouTube videos (incl. streams)

| Year | Title | Streams |
|---|---|---|
| 2006 | "One In A Million" | YouTube: 1.653.000 |
| 2006 | "Only Hope" | YouTube: 1.072.000 |
| 2006 | "Tears In Heaven" | YouTube: 3.528.000 |
| 2006 | "Irreplaceable" | YouTube: 7.547.000 |
| 2006 | "The Dock Of The Bay" | YouTube: 920.000 |
| 2006 | "Impossible" | YouTube: 961.000 |
| 2006 | "18 Years Old" | YouTube: 543.000 |
| 2006 | "Anything Is Possible" | YouTube: 1.956.000 |
| 2007 | "Have You Ever" | YouTube: 786.000 |
| 2007 | "Ironic" | YouTube: 1.295.000 |
| 2007 | "So Simple" | YouTube: 1.006.000 |
| 2007 | "Listen" | YouTube: 1.882.000 |
| 2007 | "Like A Star" | YouTube: 2.357.000 |
| 2007 | "Best Friend" | YouTube: 545.000 |
| 2007 | "How Come You Don't Call Me" | YouTube: 1.819.000 |
| 2007 | "Dance With My Father" | YouTube: 8.549.000 |
| 2007 | "You Give Me Something" | YouTube: 2.039.000 |
| 2007 | "Let Me Love You" | YouTube: 7.498.000 |
| 2007 | "What Goes Around" (with Justin Timberlake) | YouTube: 24.707.000 |
| 2007 | "Unwritten" (with Natasha Bedingfield) | YouTube: 16.927.000 |
| 2007 | "Because Of You" | YouTube: 6.530.000 |
| 2007 | "Baby Love" | YouTube: 2.618.000 |
| 2007 | "Nobody Knows" | YouTube: 2.426.000 |
| 2007 | "No One" | YouTube: 7.424.000 |
| 2008 | "Crazy & R.E.S.P.E.C.T-Medley (Live)" | YouTube: 3.145.000 |
| 2008 | "I'll Be Waiting" | YouTube: 2.792.000 |
| 2008 | "Stop And Stare" (with Ryan Tedder from OneRepublic) | YouTube: 4.634.000 |
| 2008 | "As" | YouTube: 4.337.000 |
| 2009 | "O Holy Night" | YouTube: 366.000 |
| 2010 | "My Own Way" (with Honor Society) | YouTube: 237.000 |
| 2010 | "You Lost Me" | YouTube: 196.000 |
| 2010 | "Silent Night" | YouTube: 162.000 |
| 2011 | "Someone Like You" | YouTube: 350.000 |
| 2011 | "Tears Dry On Their Own" | YouTube: 146.000 |
| 2011 | "Without You" | YouTube: 426.000 |
| 2011 | "It Will Rain" | YouTube: 289.000 |
| 2012 | "City Light (Acoustic)" | YouTube: 125.000 |
| 2013 | "Stay" | YouTube: 131.000 |
| 2013 | "Unconditionally" | YouTube: 113.000 |
| 2014 | "Counting Stars" | YouTube: 464.000 |
| 2014 | "All Of Me" | YouTube: 230.000 |
| 2014 | "Drunk In Love" | YouTube: 424.000 |
| 2014 | "Stay With Me" | YouTube: 124.000 |
| 2014 | "It's A Man's Man's Man's World" | YouTube: 133.000 |
| 2014 | "Take Me To Church" | YouTube: 131.000 |
| 2015 | "Blank Space" | YouTube: 102.000 |
| 2016 | "Sandcastles" | YouTube: 109.000 |

== Tours ==
2007

- Justin Timberlake – FutureSex/LoveShow (opening act, Europe)

2009

- Enrique Iglesias – Greatest Hits tour (opening act, Europe)
- Ne-Yo – Year of the Gentleman tour (opening act, Europe)
- Honor Society – Fashionably Late tour (opening act, United States/Canada)
- N-Dubz Christmas Party (opening act, UK)

2010

- Stanfour – Rise & Fall tour (special guest, Germany)

== Awards ==
| Year | Region | Award | Category | Result |
|---|---|---|---|---|
| 2009 | Netherlands | TMF Awards | Best Female Artist | Won |
| 2009 | Netherlands | TMF Awards | TMF Superchart Award | Won |
| 2009 | Belgium | TMF Awards | Best International Artist | Nominated |
| 2009 | Europe | MTV Europe Music Awards | Best Dutch & Belgian Act | Won |
| 2009 | Europe | MTV Europe Music Awards | Best European Act | Nominated |
| 2010 | Europe | EBBA | Most Successful Artist (outside own country) | Won |
| 2010 | Netherlands | TMF Awards | Best Female Artist | Won |
| 2010 | Netherlands | TMF Awards | Best Video "Admit It" | Nominated |
| 2010 | United Kingdom | Urban Music Awards | Best Collaboration "Until You Were Gone" | Nominated |
