= Handlebar =

A handlebar is part of the steering mechanism, in lieu of a steering wheel, for vehicles that are ridden on, such as:

- Bicycle handlebar
- Motorcycle handlebar

Handlebar may also refer to

- Handlebar moustache, a type of moustache
- Handlebars (template system), a JavaScript library to build semantic templates
- "Handlebars" (Flobots song)
- "Handlebars" (Jennie song)
