= Number One Enemy =

Single by Daisy Dares You featuring Chipmunk

from the album Rush (unreleased)
- Released: 1 March 2010
- Recorded: 2009
- Genre: Pop rock, electropop
- Length: 3:47
- Label: Jive
- Songwriters: Daisy Coburn, Matthew Marston, Chipmunk

Daisy Dares You singles chronology
"Number One Enemy" (2010)	"Rosie" (2010)

Chipmunk singles chronology
"Look for Me" (2009)	"Number One Enemy" (2010)	"Until You Were Gone" (2010)

Music video
- "Number One Enemy" on YouTube

"Number One Enemy" is the debut single from British singer Daisy Dares You. The single features Chipmunk, and was released on 1 March 2010. The song peaked at number 13, it make her only charting single to date.

== Music video ==
A music video is available for the song. The video features Daisy dancing around a colourfully decorated garden, and later features her dancing around a decorated stairwell. During his verse, Chipmunk is seen sat at a long wooden table, in which Daisy is stood dancing behind him. Various odd objects appear throughout the video, including a giant cupcake and rainbow-coloured sheep. The video seems to be inspired in parts by Lewis Carroll's Alice's Adventures in Wonderland and Through the Looking-Glass and What Alice Found There, as seen by Daisy holding a pig, the long table (reminiscent of the tea party table) and Chipmunk holding a hat similar to the Mad Hatter's. We also see Daisy encountering a white rabbit and following it down a rabbit hole at the start, a small bottle reading "Drink Me", signs saying "This Way" and "That Way", a small house (reminiscent of when Alice grows larger whilst inside the White Rabbit's house) and oversized or just plain out-of-the-ordinary objects and surroundings.

== In popular culture ==
The song was re-recorded in Simlish for the video game, The Sims 3: Ambitions.

== Critical reception ==
Nick Levine of Digital Spy gave the song a positive review.

== Chart performance ==
Following its release on 1 March 2010, "Number One Enemy" debuted in the UK Singles Chart on 7 March 2010, where it peaked at #13. The following week, the single fell 6 places to #19. On 21 March 2010, the single fell a further 8 places to #27 and the following week fell a further 7 places to #34, meaning the single spent 4 weeks in the UK Top 40. On 20 March 2010, "Number One Enemy" debuted in the European Hot 100 Singles where it peaked at #40

Chart (2010)	Peak Position
Denmark (Tracklisten)	28
UK Singles (Official Charts)	13
European Hot 100 Singles (Billboard)	40

== Release history ==
Country	Date	Format
United Kingdom	1 March 2010	CD single, digital download
