= Daisy Coburn =

British singer and songwriter

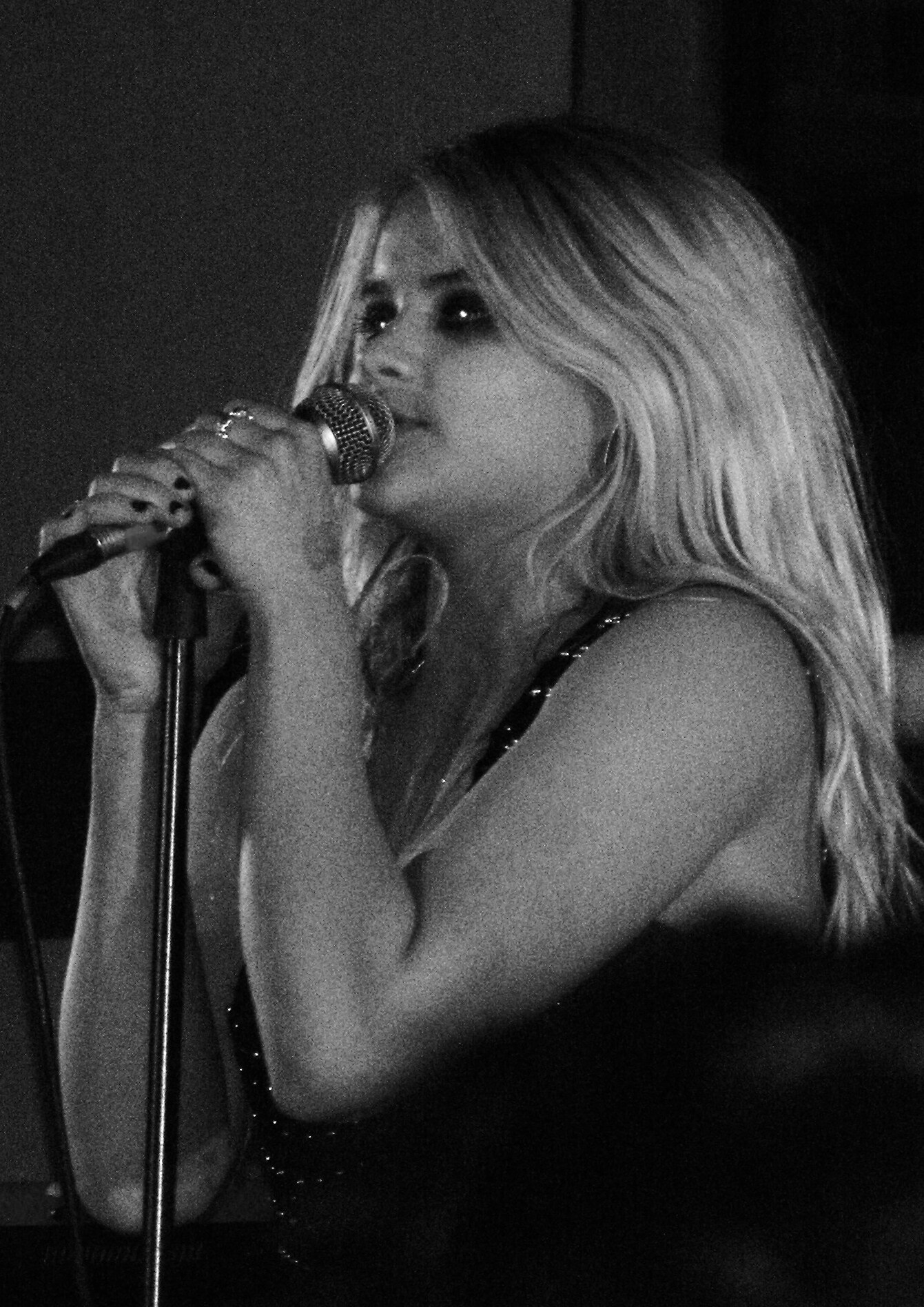
- Coburn in 2010

Background information
- Also known as: Daisy Dares You
- Born: Daisy May Keeley Coburn; 27 October 1993 (age 32)
- Origin: Great Dunmow, Essex, England
- Genres: Teen pop; pop rock; pop; electropop
- Occupation: Singer-songwriter
- Instruments: Vocals, guitar, keyboards, piano
- Years active: 2009–2010 (as Daisy Dares You); 2013–present (as Pink Lizards); 2015–present (as Clever Thing); 2018–present (as Daisy Coburn)
- Labels: Jive, RCA

Daisy May Keeley Coburn (born 27 October 1993) is a British singer and songwriter. She previously performed under the stage name Daisy Dares You, a reference to the character of the same name from the 1990s British television show ZZZap!. After performing under this name between 2009 and 2010 and recording an album which was never released, she was dropped by her record label. As of 2013, she is in a Brighton-based band called Pink Lizards, where she plays guitar and is the lead singer. From 2015 she has been performing and releasing music in her Brighton-based band Clever Thing alongside Rich Fownes (Bad For Lazarus, UNKLE, Eighties Matchbox B-line Disaster, Nine Inch Nails)

== Early life ==
Coburn was born in Great Dunmow, Essex. Coming from a musical family, with her mother once working as a backing singer for bands Duran Duran and the The, Coburn learned to play the guitar and piano when she was six years old. On Boxing Day 2007, Coburn played a song she had been writing called "Hurt" to family and friends. A friend of her mother's, Matthew Marston, heard the song and invited her to his home studio to record it. Coburn and Marston later wrote together on her debut album, Rush.

After picking up widespread promotional coverage in the media from The Times, the BBC, and The Guardian as a young artist to watch for in 2010, Coburn was signed to a record company. She was managed by Empire, and signed to Jive, a subsidiary of Sony Records. There was reportedly a 'bidding-war' to get Coburn to sign up to a record company. She mainly used social networking websites to broadcast her music, such as Myspace, where she posted demos, and her YouTube channel, where the video for her songs "Daisy Dares You" and "Rosie" can be found.

Coburn's first single, "Number One Enemy", featured British rapper Chipmunk and reached the top 20 in the UK. "Rosie" was released as the second single, however, the album Rush was not released for unknown reasons.

== Songwriting, genre and influences ==
Before Coburn was signed she would write songs on her own on a guitar. For her debut album she co-wrote several tracks with her mother's friend Matthew Marston. Much of Coburn's music is about her own personal experiences such as boyfriends, sibling rivalry, disloyal schoolfriends and emotional growing pains. Coming from a musical family and reading poetry has helped Coburn in her writing.

Coburn's musical genres vary from teen-pop to pop rock to pop and electropop. Her musical influences also vary, possibly the reason behind her varying genres; Coburn has stated she is influenced by many bands and artists such as Nirvana and Lou Reed. She has stated that her writing is influenced by indie singers such as Florence and the Machine and Bat for Lashes but when she writes "it just seems to come out as pop". Comparisons have been made between her and British singer-songwriter Lily Allen as well as Canadian singer-songwriter Avril Lavigne. Regarding her comparison to Avril Lavigne, Coburn stated: "Just because I'm female and young they have to put you in a box. Frankly, anyone who says I was influenced by Avril Lavigne can get stuffed."

== Rush ==
Rush is the intended debut studio album by Daisy Dares You, and was scheduled to be released in June 2010, with the single "Rosie" released in May 2010. The album was never released.

No.	Title	Writer(s)	Length
1.	"Number One Enemy"	Daisy Coburn, Matthew Marston, Chipmunk	3:48
2.	"Rosie"	Daisy Coburn, Matthew Marston, Rob Wells	3:23
3.	"Who Will Buy"		2:36
4.	"Rush"	Coburn, Marston, Shahid Khan, Jodi Marr
5.	"Idiot"	Coburn, Marston
6.	"Clowns"	Coburn
7.	"Talk About The Weather"	Coburn, Marston	3:55
8.	"Lost"	Coburn Marston
9.	"Next Few Minutes"	Coburn, Marston	3:45
10.	"Caught Up"	Coburn, Marston, Anders Kallmark
11.	"Stuck & Still"	Coburn, Marston, Wells	3:25
12.	"Hunter"	Coburn, Marston, Wells

== Discography ==
=== Extended plays ===
Title	Details
iTunes Festival: London 2010 (as Daisy Dares You)	Released: 27 July 2010; Label: Jive
No Love	Released: 11 December 2020; Label: Austerity
Cut the Demon	Unreleased; Label: Austerity

=== Singles ===
==== As lead artist ====
Year	Single	Peak chart position		Album
Year	Single	UK	DEN	Album
2010	"Number One Enemy" (featuring Chipmunk) (as Daisy Dares You)	13	28	Rush (unreleased)
2010	"Rosie" (as Daisy Dares You)	—	—	Rush (unreleased)
2020	"Fire"	—	—	No Love EP
2021	"My Paradise"	—	—	Cut the Demon EP (unreleased)
2021	"Ultrasound"	—	—	Cut the Demon EP (unreleased)

==== As featured artist ====
Year	Title	Album
2020	"Beautiful Scum" (Primitive Ignorant featuring Daisy Coburn)	Sikh Punk

=== Music videos ===
Year	Title	Director
2009	"Daisy Dares You"	Elisha Smith-Leverock
2010	"Number One Enemy" (featuring Chipmunk)	Rebel Alliance
2010	"Rosie"	Frank Borin
