= When Everything Breaks Open =

Studio album by Matt Morris
- Released: January 12, 2010
- Recorded: 2009
- Genre: Pop rock
- Length: 67:33
- Label: Tennman; Interscope
- Producer: Charlie Sexton; Justin Timberlake

Professional ratings
Review scores
Source	Rating
Allmusic	3.5/5 stars

When Everything Breaks Open is the debut album by American singer-songwriter Matt Morris, released January 12, 2010, on Tennman Records. Recording sessions for the album took place in Austin, Texas and Los Angeles, California. It was produced by both Charlie Sexton and his former co-star of The All-New Mickey Mouse Club and Tennman label founder Justin Timberlake.

== Track listing ==
1. "Don't You Dare" – 4:45
2. "Money" (featuring Justin Timberlake) – 3:53
3. "Love" – 4:41
4. "Bloodline" – 5:44
5. "Live Forever" – 4:17
6. "The Un-American" – 4:35
7. "Let It Go" – 3:57
8. "You Do It For Me" – 4:16
9. "Just Before The Morning" – 3:37
10. "In This House" – 4:36
11. "Forgiveness" – 5:13
12. "Someone to Love You" – 6:01
13. "Eternity" – 7:53
14. "100,000 Strong" (Bonus Track) – 5:45

== Charts ==
=== Album ===
Chart (2010)	Peak Position
Billboard 200 (U.S.)	99
Billboard Top Independent Albums	13
Billboard Top Rock Albums	31
Billboard Top Alternative Albums	25
