= Music Allies =

Music Allies is a marketing company that promotes 20+ independent record labels and major music festivals. It was started in January 2003 by Sean O'Connell. Successful artists include Ani DiFranco, Aimee Mann, G. Love, ALO, Joan Osborne, Sia, the Bacon Brothers, Sonya Kitchell, Zee Avi, Joshua James, Martin Sexton and the Blind Boys of Alabama.

Labels that utilize Music Allies include Righteous Babe Records, Tennman Records, Brushfire Records and Time Life.

Major festivals represented by Music Allies include Bonnaroo Music Festival, the Outside Lands Festival, Camp Bisco, the 10k Lakes Festival and the now defunct Vegoose, Echo Project and Langerado Music Festivals.

Music Allies produces and syndicates the Warren Haynes Christmas Jam radio special.

The company is located in Asheville, North Carolina.

According to their Linked In company profile, Music Allies is a privately held company with 12 employees based in Asheville, NC, Virginia, and Atlanta, GA.
