= Love Dealer =

Single by Esmée Denters featuring Justin Timberlake

from the album Outta Here
- Released: 4 May 2010
- Recorded: 2009
- Genre: Dance-pop
- Length: 3:45
- Label: Interscope
- Songwriters: Esmée Denters; Justin Timberlake; Mikkel S. Eriksen; Tor Erik Hermansen
- Producers: Justin Timberlake; StarGate

Esmée Denters singles chronology
| "Until You Were Gone" (2010) | "Love Dealer" (2010) | "Life Without You" (2010) |

Justin Timberlake singles chronology
| "Carry Out" (2009) | "Love Dealer" (2010) | "Winner" (2010) |

Love Dealer is Esmée Denters' third single from her debut album Outta Here. The song was written by Denters, Justin Timberlake and production team StarGate in 2009. StarGate produced the song together with Justin Timberlake, who also provided featured vocals. On 22 March 2010, British radio station BBC Radio 1Xtra confirmed that "Love Dealer" would be Esmée Denters' next single off of Outta Here. It was, however, her first official single in the US. The song was released in an attempt to help her break the US market with the help of Justin Timberlake. Due to a lack of airplay in the United Kingdom the single failed to reach the UK Top 40. It also failed to chart on the Billboard Hot 100.

== Critical reception ==
BBC Music was mixed in its review of the single: ""Love Dealer" is introduced by Timberlake in provocative fashion, but his breathily suggestive vocals dominate the mix when contrasted with Denters’ lead lines, and ultimately comprise the most memorable aspect of the experience. That's not intended to imply the girl lacks ability, but swap her contributions with those of any number of similarly stylised singers and the overall effect is the same."

== Music video ==
The music video, directed by The Malloys, was filmed in Los Angeles on March 18, 2010. Both Denters and Timberlake appeared in the video. Several official previews of the video, which premiered April 28, 2010, were featured at Denters' official website.

== Charts ==
=== Weekly charts ===
| Chart (2010) | Peak position |
|---|---|
| Belgium (Ultratip Bubbling Under Flanders) | 3 |
| Netherlands (Dutch Top 40) | 12 |
| Netherlands (Single Top 100) | 32 |
| UK Singles (Official Charts) | 68 |
| US Hot Dance Club Songs (Billboard) | 9 |

=== Year-end charts ===
| Chart (2010) | Position |
|---|---|
| Netherlands (Dutch Top 40) | 80 |

== Release history ==
| Region | Date | Format | Label |
|---|---|---|---|
| United States | May 4, 2010 | Digital download | Interscope |
| United States | May 25, 2010 | Mainstream radio | Interscope |
| United Kingdom | July 11, 2010 | Digital download | Polydor |
