= Fight with Tools =

Studio album by Flobots
- Released: October 16, 2007; May 20, 2008 (re-release)
- Recorded: 2007 at The Wrecking Room (Boulder); Brotherhood Studios (Denver)
- Genre: Rap rock, jazz fusion, alternative rock, political hip hop
- Length: 45:35
- Label: Independent (original release), Universal Republic (re-release)
- Producer: Flobots

Flobots chronology
Fight with Tools (2007)	Survival Story (2010)

Singles from Fight with Tools
- 1. "Handlebars" Released: June 15, 2008; 2. "Rise" Released: August 2008

Fight with Tools is the debut album by Flobots, originally released in October 2007 and re-released on May 20, 2008. The album was recorded in 2007 around the band's home state of Colorado. Fight with Tools received a mildly positive reception from critics who praised the production and serious subject matter. The album features the single "Handlebars" which became a popular hit on Modern Rock radio the following April, also becoming a popular hit in the UK (#14), New Zealand (#26) and Canada (#63). The album also features the single "Rise" which also became a popular hit on Modern Rock radio after its release. In the week of June 7, 2008, the album jumped on the Billboard 200 chart 168 places and peaked at number 15, selling over 265,000 copies. The album also peaked at number 52 on the UK Albums Chart.

== Critical reception ==
Professional ratings
Review scores
Source	Rating
AllMusic	3.5/5 stars
Exclaim!	(positive)
PopMatters	3/10 stars
RapReviews	8/10
Sputnikmusic	3.5/5.0

Fight with Tools garnered a mildly positive reception from music critics who praised the production and attention to political topics. Steve 'Flash' Juon of RapReviews praised the album for its use of live instrumentation and the lyrical delivery of both Jonny 5 and Brer Rabbit, concluding with, "The versatility of the Flobots sound makes them very hard to pin down, but it also makes for an entertaining musical journey that doesn't get bogged down by their politics or a preachy didactic presentation." AllMusic's David Jeffries also complimented the band for having the ambition to tackle various political messages while backed with a live orchestra, saying that "Good points are made with skill and fine wordplay, the guitars and drums crunch along driving home the message with head-bobbing grooves, and the album opens up with the marvelous "Handlebars", a carefully crafted, slowly building tale of the ego run wild via some beautiful muted trumpet." A more negative appraisal came from James Greene, Jr. of PopMatters, who criticized the album for failing to recapture what Rage Against the Machine brought before and for being preachy in its political messages. Greene stated that "At the end of the day, Flobots and their sophomore effort can be summed up by the album's third track, "Same Thing". As the chorus demonstrates, they're just saying the same things over again, giving us the same revolutionary slogans anti-establishment forces have been shouting in the face of 'The Man' for years: "We want money for healthcare and public welfare / free Mumia and Leonard Peltier!""

== Track listing ==
All tracks are written by Flobots.

No.	Title	Length
1.	"There's a War Going On for Your Mind"	1:22
2.	"Mayday!!!"	4:36
3.	"Same Thing"	3:29
4.	"Stand Up"	4:38
5.	"Fight with Tools"	4:51
6.	"Handlebars"	3:27
7.	"Never Had It"	5:07
8.	"Combat"	2:05
9.	"The Rhythm Method (Move!)"	3:52
10.	"Anne Braden"	4:21
11.	"We Are Winning"	3:22
12.	"Rise"	4:10

UK bonus track
No.	Title	Length
13.	"Iraq"	3:31

== Personnel ==
Adapted credits from the Fight with Tools booklet.

Flobots

- 0. Brer Rabbit – rapping vocals
- 5. Jonny 5 – rapping vocals
- 17. Andy Guerrero – guitar, additional vocals
- 33. Mackenzie Roberts – viola, vocals
- 69. Kenny O. – drums
- 101. Jesse Walker – bass

Additional musicians

- Joe Ferrone – trumpet (tracks 2, 3, 5, 6, 7)
- Mariel Roberts – cello (tracks 1, 4, 5, 11, 12)
- Minnie Baldwin – vocals (track 11)
- Ravi Zupa – sample (track 9)
- Dr. Vincent Harding and the Veterans of Hope Project – samples (track 10)

Production

- Flobots – production
- Kyle Jones – mixing, mastering

Artwork

- Jonathan Till – art and design
- Matt Walker – photography

== Charts ==
=== Weekly charts ===
Chart (2008)	Peak position
French Albums (SNEP)	51
Scottish Albums (OCC)	82
UK Albums (OCC)	51
UK Album Downloads (OCC)	16
UK R&B Albums (OCC)	13
US Billboard 200	15
US Top Alternative Albums (Billboard)	3
US Digital Albums (Billboard)	15
US Top R&B/Hip-Hop Albums (Billboard)	8
US Top Rap Albums (Billboard)	3
US Indie Store Album Sales (Billboard)	5

=== Year-end charts ===
Chart (2008)	Position
US Billboard 200	165
US Top R&B/Hip-Hop Albums	97
