= Outta Here (Esmée Denters song) =

2009 single by Esmée Denters

Single by Esmée Denters

from the album Outta Here
- Released: 14 April 2009
- Recorded: 2008
- Genre: R&B; dance-pop
- Length: 3:21
- Label: Tennman
- Songwriters: Jamal Jones; Jason Perry; Esther Dean
- Producers: Polow da Don; Jason Perry; Justin Timberlake; Mischke

Esmée Denters singles chronology
"Outta Here" (2009)	"Admit It" (2009)

United Kingdom cover

"Outta Here" is the title song of the debut studio album by Dutch R&B singer-songwriter Esmée Denters. It was released as the debut single both from the artist and the album in the Netherlands on 14 April 2009, 27 April in New Zealand followed by 16 August in the UK.

It is Denters's most successful single to date, reaching number three in the Netherlands, seven in the United Kingdom and the top twenty in New Zealand and Ireland.

== Background ==
Denters said in a UK interview that this song inspired the name of the album. Speaking of the album she said

I called it 'Outta Here' because to me that one song in itself actually encapsulates what the album in its entirety is about. You know, it's a pop song, it has a bit of an R&B feel, it has some rock in it, a little bit of dance... So, because I thought that mixture of styles was just so representative of the record as a whole, I decided to name the album after it.

The song has been written by Jason Perry and Ester Dean with Justin Timberlake and Polow da Don providing the production. It is also the debut single to be released on Timberlake's own record label Tennman Records. It was one of the last songs written for the album.

== Critical reception ==
David Balls of Digital Spy said "'Outta Here', co-written and produced by Justin Timberlake, is very much the typical R&B-tinged pop debut - the sort of thing deployed by the likes of Mandy Moore, Stacie Orrico. "I feel so betrayed, what a waste of my heart," Denters wails as she launches into a chorus but unfortunately there are no real signs of passion or charisma here."

The BBC gave "Outta Here" 3 out of 5 stars, calling it 'fun' and 'good'. Music Focus Release said that ""Outta Here" isn't a song that immediately grabs you. In fact on the first listen we found ourselves a little disappointed and indifferent."

== Charts ==
=== Weekly charts ===
Chart (2009)	Peak position
Belgium (Ultratop 50 Flanders)	26
Belgium (Ultratip Bubbling Under Wallonia)	3
European Hot 100	24
Ireland (IRMA)	18
Netherlands (Dutch Top 40)	3
Netherlands (Single Top 100)	2
New Zealand (Recorded Music NZ)	12
Romania (Romanian Top 100)	98
UK Singles (OCC)	7
US Dance Club Songs (Billboard)	9

=== Year-end charts ===
Chart (2009)	Position
Netherlands (Dutch Top 40)	18
Netherlands (Single Top 100)	21
UK Singles (Official Charts Company)	128

== Certifications and sales ==
Region	Certification	Certified units/sales
New Zealand (RMNZ)	Gold	7,500^{*}
United Kingdom (BPI)	Silver	200,000^{‡}
^{*} Sales figures based on certification alone.^{‡} Sales+streaming figures based on certification alone.

== Release history ==
Region	Date	Label	Format
Netherlands	April 14, 2009	Universal Music	CD single, digital download
New Zealand	April 27, 2009	Universal Music	Digital download
United Kingdom	August 16, 2009	Polydor Records	Digital download
United Kingdom	August 17, 2009	Polydor Records	CD single
United States	September 15, 2009	Tennman Records	Airplay
