= The Circle in the Square =

Studio album by Flobots
- Released: August 28, 2012
- Genres: Alternative rock, alternative hip hop
- Label: Shanachie Records

Flobots chronology
Survival Story (2010)	The Circle in the Square (2012)	Noenemies (2017)

The Circle in the Square is the third full-length studio album by alternative hip-hop band Flobots. The album was released on August 28, 2012 and peaked at No. 198 on the U.S. Billboard 200 album chart. The Circle in the Square was released by Shanachie Records, unlike their first two albums which were released by Universal Republic. The album's title track, The Circle in the Square, was the only single from the album and was released on the Flobots official YouTube channel on July 11, 2012.

== Reception ==
Professional ratings
Aggregate scores
Source	Rating
Metacritic	66/100
Review scores
Source	Rating
AllMusic	3/5 stars
Consequence of Sound	C−
PopMatters	7/10 stars
Spill Magazine	3/5

According to the review aggregator Metacritic, The Circle in the Square received "generally favorable reviews" based on a weighted average score of 66 out of 100 from six critic scores.

== Track listing ==
All tracks are written by Flobots.

No.	Title	Length
1.	"Flokovsky"	1:07
2.	"The Circle in the Square"	4:02
3.	"Run (Run Run Run)"	3:24
4.	"Sides"	3:32
5.	"On Loss And Having"	4:11
6.	"Gonna Be Free"	4:05
7.	"One Last Show"	4:01
8.	"Interlude"	0:48
9.	"Wrestling Israel"	4:28
10.	"Loneliness"	4:26
11.	"The Rose And The Thistle"	3:37
12.	"#Occupyearth"	4:32
13.	"Journey After (War Fatigues)"	5:06
14.	"Stop The Apocalypse"	4:07
15.	"..."	2:18

The lyrics say "The clock is now 11:55 on the big hand," which was the setting of the Doomsday Clock when the song was released, at "5 minutes to midnight".
