= Noenemies =

Studio album by Flobots
- Released: May 5, 2017
- Studio: Mighty Fine Studios
- Genres: Alternative rock, alternative hip-hop
- Labels: Flobots Music, LLC
- Producer: Gabriel Otto

Flobots chronology
| The Circle in the Square (2012) | Noenemies (2017) |

Singles from Noenemies
- 1. "Rattle the Cage" Released: November 8, 2016; 2. "Pray" Released: January 20, 2017; 3. "Carousel" Released: April 7, 2017

Professional ratings
Review scores
| Source | Rating |
|---|---|
| Scene Point Blank | 4.5/5 stars |
| Ronon's Reviews | 4/5 stars |
| Rocky Mountain Collegian | positive |

Noenemies is the fourth full-length studio album by alternative hip-hop band Flobots, released May 5, 2017.

== Background ==
In 2015, it was announced that Flobots were working on a new music project called No Enemies, which will focus on issues such as climate change and immigration reform. The band raised funds via Kickstarter to record two albums.

How can we get people to come together for a cause through song? That influenced the whole methodology of the song-building, period. That's the philosophy of pretty much the last three years of the band. That's the reason why we looked in a very real way at how we bring music back to protest culture. How do we establish and build a culture that communicates emotions, that uses our emotional state as a basis for power? How do we have nonviolent representations of our strength? One of those ways is by having 500 voices be on the same breath. That was the anchor for both our album and our activist work over the last few years. We started from the streets and used the songs in a community environment; then we took them to the studio.

— Stephen "Brer Rabbit" Brackett,

On November 8, 2016, Flobots released a new track, "Rattle the Cage". The song was premiered early than planned in response to the 2016 US Presidential election, with the band saying "Wounds are raw. The pain is real. We wanted to share something a little earlier than planned. This is a song for all of us." On January 20, 2017, they released another new song, the politically charged "Pray", released on the same day as the Inauguration of Donald Trump.

The album was influenced by the works of Vincent Harding, who was a mentor to the band. The group describes the album as "a body of protest songs that speak to the urgency of the current moment".

== Track listing ==
All tracks are written by Flobots, except where noted.

| No. | Title | Writer(s) | Length |
|---|---|---|---|
| 1. | "Philia (Prelude)" | | 0:36 |
| 2. | "Failure Games" | | 3:46 |
| 3. | "Blood in the River" | | 5:37 |
| 4. | "Carousel" | | 3:59 |
| 5. | "Quarantine" | | 3:36 |
| 6. | "American Dreams" | | 4:17 |
| 7. | "Rattle the Cage" | | 3:50 |
| 8. | "Buried Alive" | | 3:55 |
| 9. | "Dancing in the Light of a Burning City (Phoenixes)" | | 3:08 |
| 10. | "Antioch (Interlude)" | | 0:53 |
| 11. | "Pray" | | 3:41 |
| 12. | "Voices of the Dead" | | 4:52 |
| 13. | "Temimut (Interlude)" | | 0:45 |
| 14. | "Related" | Flobots, Pan Astral | 5:07 |
| 15. | "Hurqalya (Postlude)" | | 3:39 |
| 16. | "Sleeping Giant" | Flobots, Suzi Q | 4:15 |

Note

"Voices of the Dead" contains a sample of “Antioch” as performed by the Alabama Sacred Harp Singers.

== Personnel ==
Flobots

- Stephen Bracket aka Brer Rabbit - vocals
- Jamie Laurie aka Jonny 5 - vocals
- Kenny Ortiz - drums, percussion

Additional musicians

- Gabriel Otto - bass, keyboards, synthesizer, guitar, backing vocals, production, arrangements
- Mackenzie Gault - viola, backing vocals
- Serafin Sanchez - saxophone, keyboards
- Tad Lusk - guitar
- Tom Hagerman - violin
- Evan Orman - cello
- Charlie Mertens - upright bass
- Eva Holbrook, Maxwell McKee, Suzi Q, Sallie Baker, Chris Barker - backing vocals
- Spirit of Grace (Shamae Matthews, Tonicia London, Christin Grant, C. Larea Edwards) - backing vocals
- Denver Glenarm Singers, Colorado Children's CHorale's 303 Choir - backing vocals
- Hugh Ragin, Tom Gershwin - trumpet
- Adam Stone - keyboards
- Dave Flomberg - trombone
- Todd Divel - string and horn recording

Production

- Xandy Whitesel - recording, engineering
- Jason Livermore - mixing, mastering

Artwork

- Josiah Werning - art direction, album art
- Dustin Dahlman - album art

== Charts ==
| Chart (2017) | Peak position |
|---|---|
| US Independent Albums (Billboard) | 16 |
| US Top Alternative Albums (Billboard) | 12 |
| US Top Rock Albums (Billboard) | 22 |
