= Admit It =

Single by Esmée Denters

from the album Outta Here
- Released: 4 September 2009
- Recorded: 2008
- Genre: Dance-pop; R&B
- Length: 3:41
- Label: Polydor
- Songwriters: Esmée Denters; Toby Gad
- Producers: Justin Timberlake; Toby Gad

Esmée Denters singles chronology
"Outta Here" (2009)	"Admit It" (2009)	"Until You Were Gone" (2010)

United Kingdom cover

"Admit It" is the second single from Dutch pop singer and songwriter, Esmée Denters, from her debut studio album Outta Here. It was released as a CD single and download in the Netherlands on 4 September 2009. It was released in the UK on 28 December 2009. Due to a lack of airplay on UK radio the single failed to make the top 40.

The song was written by Esmée Denters and Toby Gad. Toby Gad produced the song, together with Justin Timberlake who also provided additional vocals and beatbox. Upon its UK release, it was described by noted R&B writer Pete Lewis of the award-winning Blues & Soul as "punchy retro-funk".

== Music video ==
Esmée in the music video for "Admit It".

The video was filmed in Los Angeles and was directed by Kenneth Cappello. It premiered on 3 September on Dutch music channel TMF. Denters said of the video, "Since I wrote this song, I really envisioned the video a certain way. It’s a fun and flirty song, and I wanted that to show in the video as well. So my friend and I just started writing the storyline for the video and gave it to the video director, Kenneth Cappello. He did an amazing job capturing all of it."

== Charts ==
Chart (2009)	Peak position
Netherlands (Dutch Top 40)	28
UK Singles (OCC)	56

== Release history ==
Region	Date	Label	Format
Netherlands	4 September 2009	Universal Music	CD single, digital download
United Kingdom	28 December 2009	Polydor Records	CD single, digital download
