= Survival Story =

Studio album by Flobots
- Released: March 16, 2010
- Recorded: 2009
- Genre: Alternative hip hop, alternative rock
- Length: 51:04
- Label: Universal Republic, Island Def Jam
- Producer: Mario Caldato Jr.

Flobots chronology
| Fight with Tools (2007) | Survival Story (2010) | The Circle in the Square (2012) |

Singles from Survival Story
- 1. "White Flag Warrior" Released: February 2, 2010

Survival Story is the second studio album by Flobots, released on March 16, 2010. It is the follow-up to 2007's Fight with Tools. Work on the album began in 2009, and it was produced by Mario Caldato, Jr. (of Beastie Boys fame). The album was met with mixed reviews from critics who commented on the band's political commentary being more preachy than their previous album.

== Critical reception ==
Professional ratings
Review scores
| Source | Rating |
|---|---|
| AllMusic | 2.5/5 stars |
| Alternative Press | 3.5/5 stars |
| No Ripcord | 2/10 |
| PopMatters | 4/10 stars |
| Sputnikmusic | 4.0/5.0 |

Survival Story garnered a mixed reception from music critics who found it more meandering and preachy with its political leanings than its predecessor Fight with Tools. Mike Schiller of PopMatters criticized the album for falling into the preachy side of delivering political messages that similar acts like Rage Against the Machine and The Roots tend to avoid, concluding that "Survival Story is Just Another Rap-Rock Record, something you've probably heard if you ever listened to P.O.D., or Linkin Park, or Limp effing Bizkit. It's trying to say something, but it's failing, and all we end up hearing is noise." Nate Adams of No Ripcord also commented on the band's similarities to Rage Against the Machine, criticizing them for delivering unfocused and vague political commentary marketed to rap-rock fans in the teenage demographic. Eddie Fleisher of Alternative Press praised the group's two MCs for their vocal performances melding well with Mario Caldato, Jr.'s production, saying that "Those looking for another 'Handlebars' may be disappointed–Survival Story is more mature effort, showing that Flobots' best material may be yet to come." Julianna Reed of Sputnikmusic praised the musicianship throughout the album for experimenting with different sounds within its rap-rock parameters while still being able to deliver tracks with political commentary, saying that "Survival Story is an enjoyable album, and old-school fans of Flobots will definitely find reasons to be hooked to it for a long time."

== Track listing ==
All tracks are written by Stephen Brackett, Andy Guerrero, James Laurie, Kenneth Ortiz, Mackenzie Roberts and Jesse Walker, except where noted.

| No. | Title | Writer(s) | Length |
|---|---|---|---|
| 1. | "Cracks in the Surface" | | 2:55 |
| 2. | "The Effect" | | 4:27 |
| 3. | "Defend Atlantis" | | 5:03 |
| 4. | "If I" | | 3:43 |
| 5. | "White Flag Warrior" (featuring Tim McIlrath of Rise Against) | Brackett; Guerrero; Laurie; Ortiz; Roberts; McIlrath; Walker | 3:41 |
| 6. | "By the Time You Get This Message..." | | 5:37 |
| 7. | "Airplane Mode" | | 5:43 |
| 8. | "Whip$ and Chain$" | | 3:56 |
| 9. | "Good Soldier" | | 4:06 |
| 10. | "Superhero" | | 3:22 |
| 11. | "Infatuation" (featuring Matt Morris) | Brackett; Guerrero; Laurie; Ortiz; Roberts; Morris; Walker | 4:26 |
| 12. | "Panacea for the Poison" | | 4:05 |
| Total length: | | | 51:04 |

== Singles ==
"White Flag Warrior" was the first single from the album, released digitally on 2 February 2010.

== Personnel ==
Group members

- Jamie Laurie – vocals, songwriter, guitar, drums, bass, keyboard
- Andy Guererro – guitars, background vocals
- Kenny Ortiz – drums
- Brer Rabbit – vocals, songwriter
- Mackenzie Roberts – viola, vocals, background vocals
- Jesse Walker – bass

Additional

- Omar Al-Joulani – booking
- Nate Albert – artists and repertoire
- Mario Caldato, Jr. – producer
- Corrie Christopher – booking
- Chris Gehringer – audio mastering
- Michele Goldberg – artists and repertoire
- Kristina Grossman – artists and repertoire
- J.J. Italiano – management
- Tom MacKay – artists and repertoire
- Tim McIlrath – guest vocals
- Matt Morris – guest vocals
- Jonathan Till – artwork

== Charts ==
| Chart (2010) | Peak position |
|---|---|
| French Albums (SNEP) | 47 |
| US Billboard 200 | 44 |
| US Top Alternative Albums (Billboard) | 9 |
| US Digital Albums (Billboard) | 14 |
| US Top Rock Albums (Billboard) | 11 |
| US Indie Store Album Sales (Billboard) | 15 |
