= Flobots =

American rap rock group

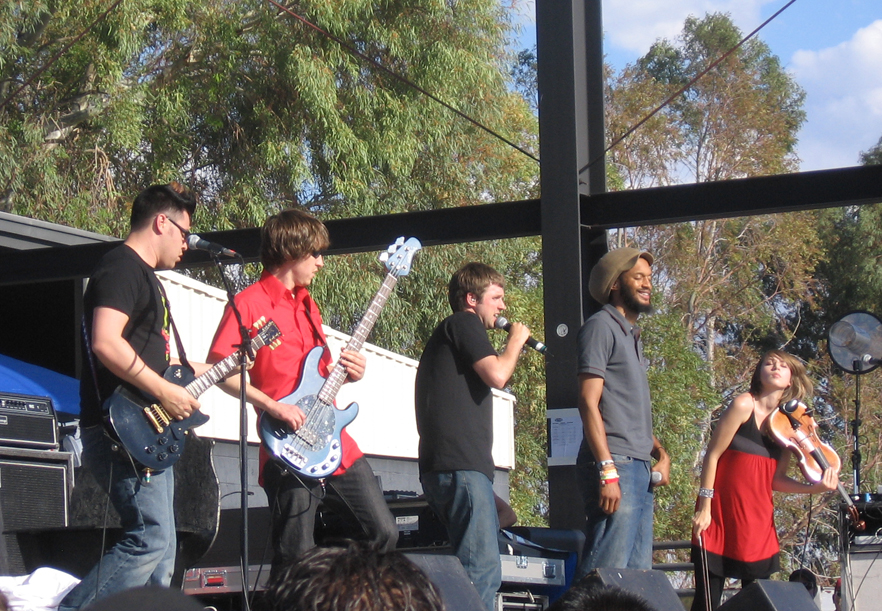
- Flobots at KFMA Day in Tucson, Arizona on May 16, 2008. From left to right: Andy Guerrero, Jesse Walker, Jamie Laurie, Stephen Brackett, MacKenzie Gault

Background information
- Origin: Denver, Colorado, US
- Genres: Alternative hip hop; rap rock; alternative rock; political hip hop; indie rock
- Years active: 2000–present
- Labels: Flobots Music, LLC (current); Universal Republic, Island Def Jam, Shanachie Records (former)
- Members: Jamie "Jonny 5" Laurie; Stephen "Brer Rabbit" Brackett; Kenny "KennyO" Ortiz; Andy "Rok" Guerrero
- Past members: Joe Ferrone; Mackenzie Gault; Andrew "AK" Norton; Jesse Walker
- Website: www.flobots.com

Flobots is an experimental hip hop band from Denver, Colorado, formed in 2005 by Jamie Laurie. The band's origins date back 5 years earlier to a similar project by Laurie. Flobots found mainstream success with their major label debut Fight with Tools (2007), featuring the single "Handlebars", which became a popular hit on Modern Rock radio in April 2008. The band has released four studio albums and one EP, with their latest Noenemies being released in May 2017.

== History ==
=== Origins (1996–2005) ===
The Flobots project started in the mid-1990s, with two albums self-released on cassette tape in 1996 and 1998. The personnel and aliases varied between the albums, but by the second album James Laurie was using the alias "Johnny Five". In 2000, James Laurie now going by "Jonny 5", teamed up with producer Farhad Ebrahimi, a.k.a. Yahktoe (who had contributed to the previous Flobots cassette as musician, producer and cover designer). Together they released Onomatopoeia in 2001 under the alias "Jonny 5 + Yak", and the title track ended up in a compilation by the MIT Songwriting Club at Yahktoe's alma mater. In that compilation, the band was still credited as "Flobots" (and as "Flobots (a.k.a. Jonny5 and Yak)" in the liner notes). The title track featured guitar player David Gralow, cello player Terrence Favors, and bass player Jaymz Haynes.

=== Platypus and Fight with Tools (2005–2008) ===
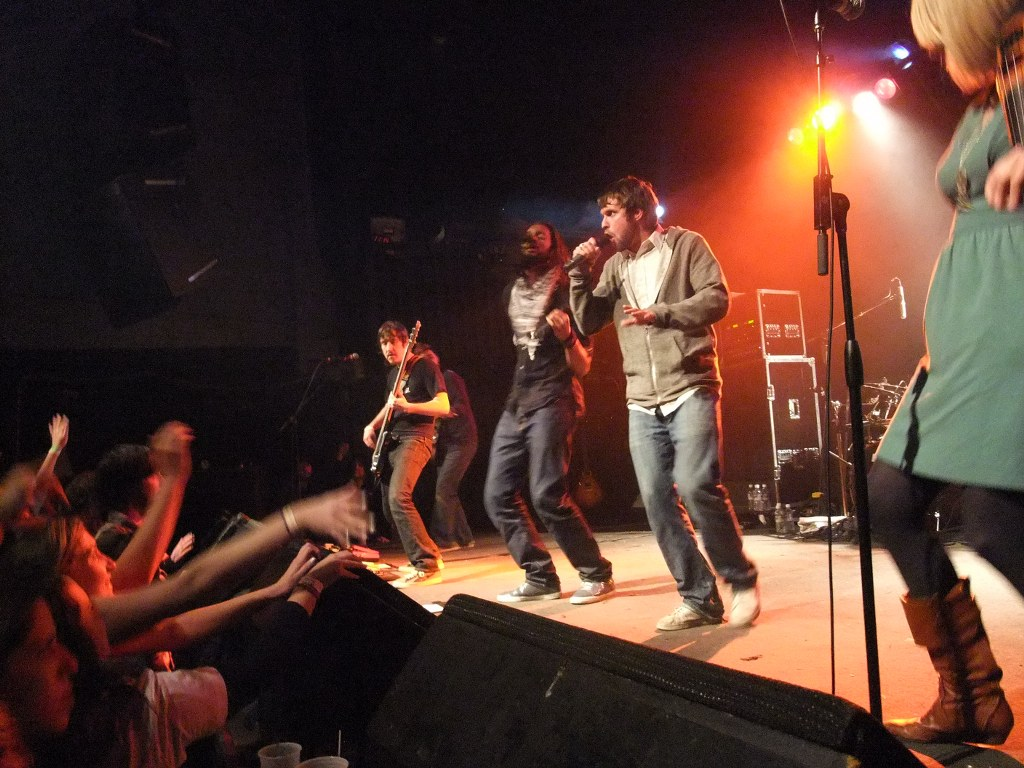
Flobots in 2009.

After the release of Onomatopoeia, the project went on a hiatus. In 2005, Laurie reformed the project under the name The Flobots. Joining Laurie was MC/vocalist Stephen "Brer Rabbit" Brackett, bassist Jesse Walker, guitarist Andy Guerrero, trumpet player Joe Ferrone, viola player Mackenzie Gault, and drummer Kenny Ortiz. Guerrero and Ferrone were previously in the band Bop Skizzum together. With a revamped lineup, Flobots released their debut EP under the new name Flobots Present...Platypus, which went on to sell more than 3,000 copies over the next two years.

After the release of Platypus, Flobots began work on their next album. After a year of writing and producing, the Flobots released their proper debut album Fight with Tools and sold out their CD release show at the Gothic Theatre in Englewood, Colorado. A Denver Post survey of music critics ranked Flobots the 51st best independent band in all of Colorado in late 2007.

Flobots entered a contest held by Denver radio station 93.3 (KTCL), called Hometown for the Holidays, which allowed fans to vote for their favorite songs from 35 local bands. Flobots subsequently won both the radio portion of the contest as well as the live performance award. As a result, the station put "Handlebars" into full rotation at the end of January due to the immense popularity of the song during the contest.

In February 2008, Flobots held a show at the Gothic Theatre in Englewood called "The Heart Attack" featuring local bands The Hot IQs and Paper Bird. It was after this show that the group was approached by and subsequently signed to Universal Republic on a two CD major label deal. On March 31, the band announced that they would be playing Tucson, Arizona's major alternative rock festival, KFMA Day, with Metallica, Apocalyptica, Chiodos, and Scars on Broadway on May 16. Flobots were also part of the sixteenth annual KROQ Weenie Roast on May 17, along with Atreyu, Bad Religion, Flogging Molly, Metallica, The Offspring, Pennywise, The Raconteurs, Rise Against, Scars on Broadway and Seether. On July 20, 2008, Flobots played at the Mile High Music Festival in Commerce City, Colorado with headliners Dave Matthews Band and John Mayer. On July 26, 2008, Flobots played 93.3's Big Gig at Coors Amphitheater in Greenwood Village, Colorado with Offspring. On September 1, 2008, they performed at Bumbershoot Music and Arts Festival in Seattle, Washington.

The single "Handlebars" became popular on alternative rock radio in April 2008 and peaked at No. 3 on Billboard's Modern Rock Tracks chart. Fight With Tools peaked at #15 on the Billboard charts, the band's highest-charting album to date.

They made their television debut on Last Call with Carson Daly on May 20, 2008. Also on May 20, Flobots spent two hours with Dr. Drew and Stryker answering sex questions on Loveline and re-released their album Fight With Tools to a wider audience after their newfound success. Flobots also appeared on The Tonight Show with Jay Leno on June 5, 2008, with their song "Handlebars". They performed their second single "Rise" on Late Night with Conan O'Brien on October 13, 2008.

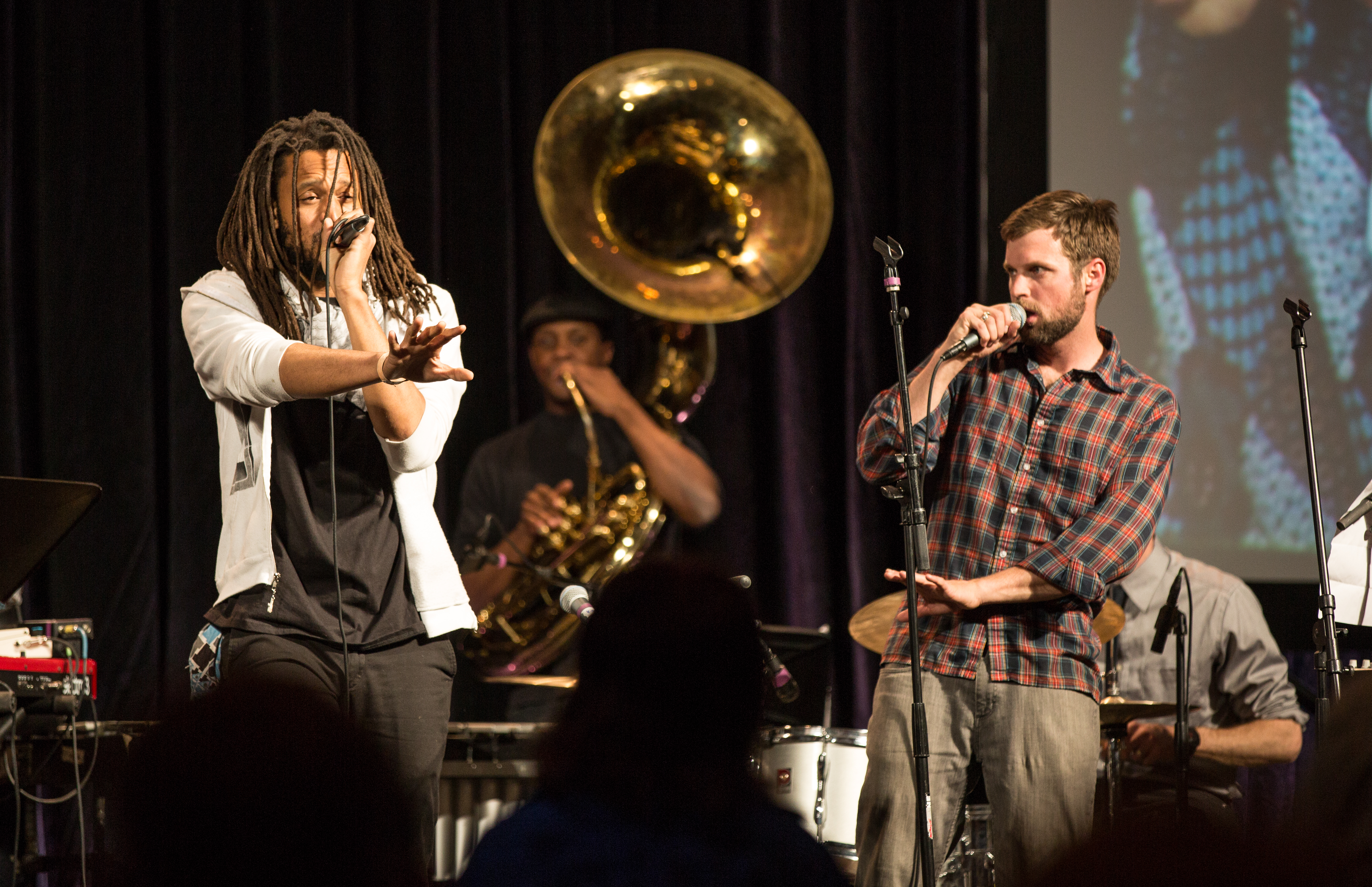
Flobots performing at National Conference for Media Reform in 2013.

=== Survival Story and The Circle in the Square (2009–2014) ===
On February 17, 2009, the Flobots announced in a MySpace blog entry that they were "working really hard on their next album and plan to have it completed soon."

In September 2009, the band finished recording their second album. The band announced on YouTube that the album was to be titled Survival Story. The album was released on March 16, 2010. The key single from that album is the song "White Flag Warrior", featuring Tim McIlrath of Rise Against. The album was produced by Mario Caldato, Jr., best known for his work with The Beastie Boys.

In December 2010, the band parted ways with Universal Republic Records. Brer Rabbit mentioned that the split was a mutual decision between the band and the label.

In the summer of 2011, lead guitarist Andy "Rok" Guerrero left the group due to "creative differences" and to focus on his previous project, Bop Skizzum. On September 17, 2011, while performing at the Gallogly Events Center, UCCS, Colorado Springs, the Flobots announced that "they will be releasing an album in 2012 so they might as well name it Stop The Apocalypse." They also performed a brand new song off the album titled The Circle in the Square. It was revealed via their official website on June 15, 2012, that the album would not be titled Stop the Apocalypse, but will be called The Circle in the Square and will be released on August 28, 2012. On June 20, the band posted a video for the title song The Circle in the Square on their YouTube channel. On August 28, 2012, their album The Circle in the Square was released.

In 2013 and 2014, The Flobots performed a free concert for high school students in Jefferson County, Colorado for the annual A Day Without Hate rally. In an interview with Standley Lake High School's news magazine The Lake, Jamie Laurie mentioned how he believed A Day Without Hate was "really inspiring."

On May 7, 2013, the band released video for a previously unreleased song called "Rockmine."

=== Noenemies (2015–present) ===
In 2015, it was announced that they were working on a new music project called Noenemies, which will focus on issues such as climate change and immigration reform. The band raised funds via Kickstarter to record two albums.

How can we get people to come together for a cause through song? That influenced the whole methodology of the song-building, period. That's the philosophy of pretty much the last three years of the band. That's the reason why we looked in a very real way at how we bring music back to protest culture. How do we establish and build a culture that communicates emotions, that uses our emotional state as a basis for power? How do we have nonviolent representations of our strength? One of those ways is by having 500 voices be on the same breath. That was the anchor for both our album and our activist work over the last few years. We started from the streets and used the songs in a community environment; then we took them to the studio.

— Stephen "Brer Rabbit" Brackett

On November 8, 2016, Flobots have released a new track from the upcoming album on their official SoundCloud, "Rattle the Cage". The song was premiered earlier than planned in response to the 2016 US presidential election, with the band saying "Wounds are raw. The pain is real. We wanted to share something a little earlier than planned. This is a song for all of us".

On January 20, 2017, they released another new song, the politically charged "Pray", released on the same day as the inauguration of Donald Trump.

In March 2017, Flobots teamed up with Wonderbound to create a "Hip-hop ballet" set to Flobots music.

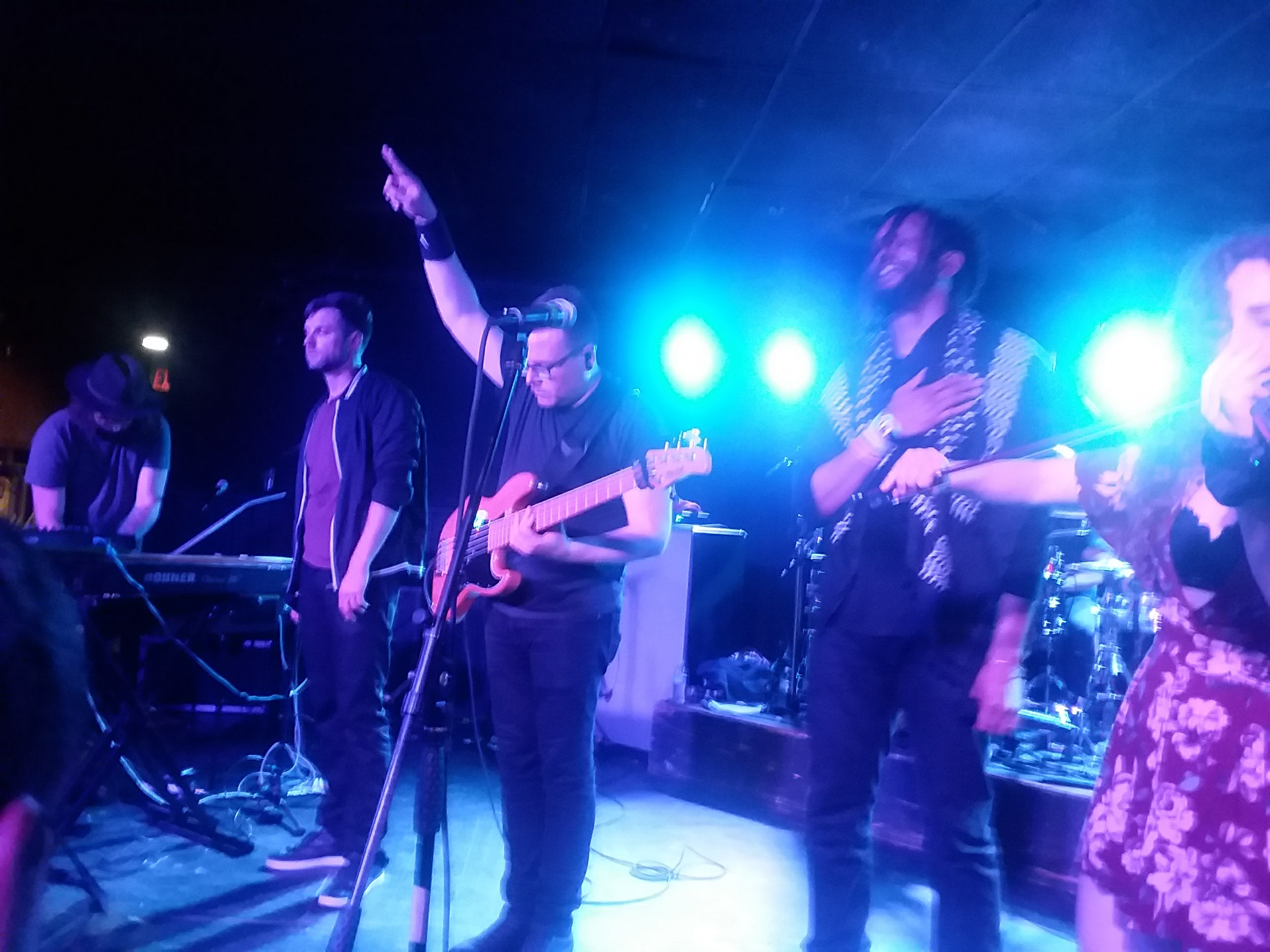
Flobots performing live in Lawrence, KS in June 2017

On May 5, 2017, Noenemies was officially released. The album was influenced by the works of Vincent Harding, who was a mentor to the band. The group describes the album as "a body of protest songs that speak to the urgency of the current moment." The band intends to release a follow-up album soon afterwards, with new songs already debuted live.

== Webcomics ==
=== Rise of the Flobots ===
The webcomic series created by D.J. Coffman (13) Rise of the Flobots: Architects of Change launched on June 9, 2008, at flobots.net, and features stories inspired by fans and the music of the Flobots along in a science fiction context.

== Band members ==
Current members (Note: Laurie, Brackett and Ortiz are listed as members of the band on the band's latest release, with Gault listed as a "special guest". Promotional photos of the most recent release have included only Laurie, Brackett and occasionally Ortiz. However, Mackenzie Gault and Jesse Walker have previously been listed as members of the band. The band frequently plays with touring members with Laurie, Brackett and Ortiz the only consistent members.)

- Jamie "Jonny 5" Laurie – lead vocals (2005–present)
- Stephen "Brer Rabbit" Brackett – lead vocals (2005–present)
- Kenny "KennyO" Ortiz – drums (2005–present)
- Andy "Rok" Guerrero – guitar, vocals (2005–2011, 2018, 2020–present)

Former members

- Jesse Walker – bass guitar (2005–2014, 2018)
- Mackenzie (née Roberts) Gault – viola, vocals (2005–2016, 2018)

Session members

- Joe Ferrone – trumpet
- Gabriel Otto – bass, keyboards
- Serafin Sanchez – saxophone, keyboards
- Tad Lusk – guitar
- Tom Hagerman – violin
- Evan Orman – cello
- Charlie Mertens – bass
- Spirit of Grace (Shamae Matthews, Tonicia London, Christin Grant, C. Larea Edwards)- vocals

Touring members

- Sean Blanchard – bass
- Kris Becker – guitar, keyboards
- Sarah Hubbard – violin, theremin
- Serafin Sanchez – saxophone
- Spirit of Grace – backing vocals
- David Ochoa – guitar

== Discography ==
=== Studio albums ===
- Fight with Tools (2007; re-released in 2008) – US No. 15 266,867 copies sold in the US, UK No. 52
- Survival Story (2010) US No. 44
- The Circle in the Square (2012) US No. 198
- Noenemies (2017)

=== Extended plays ===
- Flobots Present...Platypus (2005)
- Live at the House of Blues – Anaheim, CA (2009)

=== Singles ===
Year	Title	Peak positions										Certifications	Album
Year	Title	FRA	BEL (Wa)	SWI	US	US Pop	US Mod	US DS	CAN	UK	NZ	Certifications	Album
2008	"Handlebars"	51	78	25	37	30	3	20	63	14	26	RIAA: Platinum; BPI: Silver	Fight with Tools
2008	"Rise"	35	86	42	—	—	33	—	—	—	—		Fight with Tools
2010	"White Flag Warrior" (featuring Tim McIlrath from Rise Against)	28	23	13	—	—	22	—	—	—	—		Survival Story
2012	"The Circle in the Square"	16	74	35	—	—	—	—	—	—	—		The Circle in the Square
2016	"Rattle the Cage"	9	35	14	—	—	—	—	—	—	—		Noenemies
2017	"Pray"	—	—	—	—	—	—	—	—	—	—		Noenemies
2017	"Carousel"	—	—	—	—	—	—	—	—	—	—		Noenemies
2021	"Roshni"	—	—	—	—	—	—	—	—	—	—		—
2021	"Me & You (Happy 2gether)"	—	—	—	—	—	—	—	—	—	—		—
2021	"When It Falls"	—	—	—	—	—	—	—	—	—	—		—
2021	"We Win The Day"	—	—	—	—	—	—	—	—	—	—		—
2022	"Handle Your Bars" (featuring Nuabaa-Sorelle (Spirit of Grace))	—	—	—	—	—	—	—	—	—	—		—
2026	"The Revival" (featuring Spirit of Grace)	—	—	—	—	—	—	—	—	—	—		—
"—" denotes releases that did not chart or have yet to chart.

=== Music videos ===
- "Handlebars" (2008)
- "Rise" (2008)
- "White Flag Warrior" (2010)
- "The Circle In The Square" (2012)
- "Rockmine" (2013)
- "Pray" (2017)
- "Quarantine" (2017)
- "Rattled Pt. 1" (2017)
- "Handle Your Bars" (2017)
- "Duel Lingo" (2018)
- "Carousel" (2018)

== Appearances in compilations ==
- MIT Songwriting Club – Songs From the Institute, Vol. 1 (2001) [Track 16: Onomatopoeia, credited to Flobots]
- They appeared as part of the Audition computer video game soundtrack compilation as a playable song with Handlebars
- Their song "Rise" was included in the Winter Dew Tour Soundtrack 2009 after performing a concert for the tour's stop at Mount Snow.
- Their song "Stand Up" was included in the "Dear New Orleans" compilation album in 2010 marking the 5th anniversary of Hurricane Katrina.
