= Outta Here =

Studio album by Esmée Denters
- Released: 22 May 2009
- Length: 55:37
- Label: Tennman; Interscope
- Producer: Danja; Mike Elizondo; Toby Gad; Rob Knox; Hannon Lane; MachoPsycho; Robbie Nevil; Novel; Jason Perry; Polow da Don; Stargate; Mark Taylor; Ryan Tedder; Justin Timberlake

Singles from Outta Here
- 1. "Outta Here" Released: 14 April 2009; 2. "Admit It" Released: 4 September 2009; 3. "Love Dealer" Released: 4 May 2010

Outta Here is the debut studio album by Dutch pop artist and songwriter Esmée Denters. It was released on Tennman Records in May and June 2009 in Europe, and was released in the UK on 11 January 2010. Production was handled mostly and executively by Tennman founder Justin Timberlake with Denters herself co-writing the album.

The album was preceded by the release of the title track "Outta Here" as the first single. The song was released in April 2009, reaching top ten in the Netherlands and the UK, number 12 in New Zealand, and number 26 in Belgium. After the album's release, "Admit It" was released as the second single on 4 September 2009 and peaked at 28 in the Netherlands.

== Background ==
In August 2006, Denters made a YouTube channel and began posting a series of low-tech videos that showed the artist covering songs from Beyoncé, Natalie Imbruglia and others. She rapidly gained a following. In early 2007, Denters started her professional career after attracting the attention of Dutch media scouts and American pop singer Justin Timberlake. Timberlake went on to sign her as the first artist to his label Tennman Records, a joint venture with Interscope Records. The deal placed her as the opening act for a handful of Timberlake's European shows.

Production on Outta Here kicked off in the summer of 2007 when Timberlake and Denters began writing and producing songs. In April 2009, Denters confirmed on Dutch radio station Radio 538 that the album would be released on 22 May 2009 and contain a mix of pop and R&B with both ballads, and uptempo tracks. Speaking in October 2009, Esmée explained to noted UK R&B writer Pete Lewis of Blues & Soul her reasons for naming her debut album after her debut single: "I called it Outta Here because to me that one song in itself actually encapsulates what the album in its entirety is about. You know, it's a pop song, it has a bit of an R&B feel, it has some rock in it, a little bit of dance... So, because I thought that mixture of styles was just so representative of the record as a whole, I decided to name the album after it."

== Promotion ==
"Outta Here," produced by Polow Da Don and Justin Timberlake, was issued as the album's first single. On 13 May, a music video for the song was released. The song itself was made available for download on 14 May 2009. "Admit It," co-produced by Toby Gad, was released as the second single from Outta Here. An accompanying music video premiered on 3 September on Dutch Music Channel TMF. "Love Dealer," the album's third and final single, was released on 4 May 2010.

== Critical reception ==
Professional ratings
Review scores
Source	Rating
AllMusic	3.5/5 stars
The Guardian	3/5 stars

AllMusic editor Jon O'Brien found that "Timberlake's constant presence could have overshadowed his protégé's first offering, but Denters proves she's just as capable without the aid of her superstar mentor [...] At its best, Outta Here is as a well-produced, female-fronted companion to Timberlake's FutureSex/LoveSounds which suggests that in the future, the next YouTube sensation could well be discovered singing one of Denters' very own songs. BBC Music's Mike Diver remarked that "Denters is no album artist, yet, but a couple of these tracks could be great singles [...] Outta Here's stringent adherence to contemporary pop/R&B conventions is its undoing. A couple of tracks, "Victim" particularly, could leave a significant mark on the singles chart, but as an album artist Denters has a long way to go before she's ranked alongside the true pop idols she evidently envies." Caroline Sullivan from The Guardian concluded: "The highly polished, predominantly uptempo songs are listenable enough, but the lack of a signature style will ultimately work against Denters."

== Track listing ==
Dutch edition
No.	Title	Writer(s)	Producer(s)	Length
1.	"Admit It"	Esmée Denters; Toby Gad	Justin Timberlake; Gad	3:42
2.	"Victim"	Denters; Ryan Tedder	Timberlake; Tedder	3:36
3.	"Outta Here"	Jamal Jones; Jason Perry; Ester Dean	Polow da Don; Perry; Timberlake; Mischke^{[a]}	3:21
4.	"Love Dealer" (featuring Justin Timberlake)	Denters; Timberlake; Mikkel S. Eriksen; Tor Erik Hermansen	Stargate; Timberlake	3:45
5.	"Gravity"	Denters; Timberlake; Hannon Lane	Timberlake; Lane; Jim Beanz^{[a]}	5:48
6.	"What If"	Denters; Robin Lynch; Niklas Olovson	Timberlake; MachoPsycho	3:41
7.	"Memories Turn to Dust"	Denters; Mike Elizondo; Chantal Kreviazuk	Timberlake; Elizondo	3:57
8.	"Getting Over You"	Denters; Robbie Nevil	Timberlake; Nevil; Beanz^{[a]}	3:21
9.	"Just Can't Have It"	Johntá Austin; Eriksen; Hermansen; Espen Lind; Amund Bjørklund	Stargate; Timberlake	3:59
10.	"The First Thing"	Denters; Mark Taylor; Paul Barry; Niara Scarlett	Timberlake; Taylor	3:13
11.	"Casanova" (featuring Justin Timberlake)	Denters; Timberlake; Nate Hills; Marcella Araica	Danja; Timberlake	4:29
12.	"Bigger than the World"	Timberlake; Elizondo; Robin Tadross; James Fauntleroy II	Timberlake; Rob Knox; Mischke^{[a]}	4:53
13.	"Sad Symphony" (bonus track)	Denters; Timberlake; Candice Nelson	Timberlake	4:39

Dutch digital edition bonus track
No.	Title	Writer(s)	Producer(s)	Length
14.	"Eyes for You"	Denters; Alonzo Stevenson; Tony Reyes; Al Dubin; H. Warren; George Clinton	Novel	3:51
Total length:				56:15

International edition bonus track
No.	Title	Writer(s)	Producer(s)	Length
14.	"Follow My Lead" (featuring Justin Timberlake)	Denters; Timberlake; Tadross; Fauntleroy II	Timberlake; Rob Knox	3:16
Total length:				55:40

North American physical edition
No.	Title	Length
1.	"Admit It"	3:42
2.	"Outta Here"	3:21
3.	"Love Dealer" (featuring Justin Timberlake)	3:45
4.	"Gravity"	5:48
5.	"What If"	3:41
6.	"Memories Turn to Dust"	3:57
7.	"Getting Over You"	3:21
8.	"Casanova" (featuring Justin Timberlake)	4:29
Total length:		32:04

North American digital edition
No.	Title	Length
1.	"Love Dealer" (featuring Justin Timberlake)	3:45
2.	"Outta Here"	3:21
3.	"Admit It"	3:42
4.	"Casanova" (featuring Justin Timberlake)	4:29
5.	"Gravity"	5:48
6.	"Getting Over You"	3:21
7.	"What If"	3:41
8.	"Memories Turn to Dust"	3:57
9.	"Crazy Place"	3:53
10.	"Sad Symphony"	4:39
Total length:		40:36

Notes

- ^{^[a]} denotes vocal producer(s)

== Charts ==
=== Weekly charts ===
Weekly chart performance for Outta Here
Chart (2009–10)	Peak position
Belgian Albums (Ultratop Flanders)	55
Dutch Albums (Album Top 100)	5
UK Albums (OCC)	48

=== Year-end charts ===
Year-end chart performance for Outta Here
Chart (2009)	Position
Dutch Albums (Album Top 100)	89

== Release history ==
Outta Here release history
Region	Date	Label	Ref(s)
Netherlands	22 May 2009	Universal Music	
Belgium	11 July 2009	Universal Music	
United Kingdom	11 January 2010	Polydor Records	
United States	24 August 2010	Interscope Records	
