= Until You Were Gone (Chipmunk song) =

Single by Chipmunk featuring Esmée Denters

from the album I Am Chipmunk (Platinum Edition)
- Released: 16 April 2010
- Recorded: 2010
- Genre: Hip hop, R&B
- Length: 3:30
- Label: Jive
- Songwriters: Fraser T Smith, Chipmunk & Ayak Thiik
- Producer: Fraser T Smith

Chipmunk singles chronology
"Number One Enemy" (2010)	"Until You Were Gone" (2010)	"Flying High" (2010)

Esmée Denters singles chronology
"Admit It" (2009)	"Until You Were Gone" (2010)	"Love Dealer" (2010)

"Until You Were Gone" is Chipmunk's sixth single and features Dutch singer Esmée Denters. The track is the first single from the platinum edition of I Am Chipmunk. The single was recorded in January 2010 with producer, Fraser T Smith, and songwriter Ayak Thiik. On 19 April 2010, BBC Radio 1Xtra DJ MistaJam announced on his Twitter that he would play "Until You Were Gone" for the first time on the radio, and later premiered it on the radio. Chipmunk revealed that he wrote this song about a girl called Carys Hughes.

== Critical reception ==
Robert Copsey of Digital Spy gave the song a positive review stating: "As far as collaborations go, this one takes the biscuit, dunks it in a cuppa, and then cheekily asks for another. The 19-year-old rapper and the Dutch Timberlake protégé hardly seem like the most obvious doublet, but they've defied the odds on this trailer single for Chipmunk's repackaged I Am Chipmunk LP. According to Chip's twitterings, he asked Denters personally to feature on the track after holding it back for The Right Voice. It's a tale as old a time. To be fair though, he wasn't wrong - together they sound like a match made in hip-pop heaven. As Chip mourns over losing his Mrs, Denters swoops in to croon: "I didn't know how much I missed you / Until you were gone, gone, gone." The track's catchy hook is matched by Esmee's silky-smooth vocals, a welcome surprise after her somewhat underwhelming solo singles. Chipmunk hasn't broken rank from his winning formula here, but thanks to the sharp lyrics, that addictive melody and some typically clean Fraser T Smith production, he's easily forgiven.".

== Music video ==
On 4 March 2010 Esmée Denters and Chipmunk recorded the music video in an unknown London-based studio. He did this because this is how he felt when his girlfriend left him. The video is directed by Emil Nava. Esmée made updates on her Twitter with pictures from the set. Chipmunk himself also notified he was shooting the music video with Esmée on his Twitter. Despite the fact Chipmunk noted the video would have its nationwide premiere on 16 April 2010, the music video premiered on 20 March 2010 on T4.

== Track listing ==
- Digital download
1. "Until You Were Gone" - 3:30
2. "Until You Were Gone" (Buzz Junkies Radio Edit) - 3:29
3. "Oopsy Daisy" (BBC Live Version) - 3:43
4. "Look for Me" (BBC Live Version) - 5:00
- CD single
1. "Until You Were Gone" - 3:30
2. "Until You Were Gone" (Instrumental) - 3:30

== Chart performance ==
The BBC Radio 1 midweek chart had "Until You Were Gone" at number 2 on the UK Singles Chart on 25 April 2010, but it entered the UK Singles Chart at number 3, selling 57,536 copies in its first week. It entered the Irish Singles Chart on 22 April at number 33. Two weeks later, the single climbed to its peak of 24.

== Charts ==
=== Weekly charts ===
Chart (2010)	Peak position
Australia (ARIA)	41
Europe (European Hot 100 Singles)	17
Ireland (IRMA)	24
UK Singles (OCC)	3
UK Hip Hop/R&B (OCC)	2

=== Year-end charts ===
Chart (2010)	Position
UK Singles (OCC)	109

== Sales and certifications ==
Region	Certification	Certified units/sales
United Kingdom (BPI)	Silver	200,000^{^}
^{^} Shipments figures based on certification alone.
