= Handlebars (Flobots song) =

Single by Flobots

from the album Fight with Tools
- Released: April 11, 2008
- Recorded: 2005
- Genre: Indie rock; rap rock; alternative hip hop; political hip hop
- Length: 3:27
- Label: Universal Republic
- Songwriters: Jamie Laurie; Andrew Guerrero; Jesse Walker; Kenneth Ortiz; Mackenzie Roberts; Stephen Brackett
- Producer: Flobots

Flobots singles chronology
"Handlebars" (2008)	"Rise" (2008)

Audio sample
- file; help

Music video
- Handlebars on YouTube

"Handlebars" is a song by Flobots. It was released as the first single from their debut album, Fight with Tools, and is the group's largest success, peaking at number 37 on the Billboard Hot 100 and number three on the Billboard Modern Rock Tracks chart.

== Background ==
"Handlebars" was originally released in 2005 on the band's first EP, Flobots Present...Platypus, before being re-released on Fight with Tools two years later with re-recorded vocals. The song won in a fan-voted local radio station contest at the end of 2007, giving the song the chance to be played on the station. The song was so popular that it was put into full rotation at the station by the end of January 2008, attracting the attention of record companies. Flobots ultimately signed with Universal Republic off the back of the single's success.

In May 2019, Flobots sued YouTube user Logan Paul for copyright infringement over his 2017 single "No Handlebars". The group has requested all royalties for the song, which has earned Paul over $1 million since 2017.

== Theme ==
Flobots vocalist Jamie Laurie stated that the song is about

the idea that we have so much incredible potential as human beings to be destructive or to be creative. And it's tragic to me that the appetite for military innovation is endless, but when it comes to taking on a project like ending world hunger, it's seen as outlandish. It's not treated with the same seriousness. ... at the same time, I knew there were people at that moment who were being bombed by our own country. And I thought that was incredibly powerful.

It is the contrast between these "little moments of creativity, these bursts of innovation," and the way these ideas are put to use "to oppress and destroy people" that the singer feels is "beautiful and tragic at the same time."

== Music video ==
The animated video for the song opens with two young friends, one wearing casual clothes and the other in a businesslike suit, seated on their bicycles on a hill looking over a city. Prominent in the city is a crystalline tower with part of its framework showing. The friends ride their bikes down the hill without their hands on the handlebars until they arrive at a sign that points in two directions, one labeled with a corporate-looking symbol leading to a shadowed street, and the other labeled by a dove leading down a sunlit street. They hug and head their separate ways, the casual friend taking the path of the dove.

The casual friend describes his hobbies and skills, including things he can teach people, as he walks along a cracked sidewalk and sees a chalk drawing depicting the friends on their bicycles. He walks past a street corner that shows a path to the corporate street, unaware of the blood on that street's walls. After he calls his friend on his cellphone, the corporate friend lists his accomplishments in science and business before arriving at the tower. He is next seen in the tower rising to become the leader of the corporation. He then gives a televised speech behind a podium, while the background changes from a corporate to a political setting with two American flags. The casual friend sees it in a store window, disappointedly shaking his head.

As the world descends into a bleak dystopia, the casual friend begins rallying a crowd of oppressed-looking people while the now-dictator-like friend lists everything he can do as a result of his power. The rebellious friend leads the crowd towards the tower, but heavily armed riot-control officers proceed to shoot them all dead. The dictator friend looks on horrified as he sees his friend's body fall to the ground. The video ends with a flashback of the two friends crisscrossing as they ride their bicycles, again without using their handlebars, off into a bright light in the distance.

Several times in the video, a dove is used to symbolize peace, while a hawk represents oppressive power destroying that peace. During the instrumental break, a hawk kills a dove, and a wrecking ball destroys a wall with a dove painted on it, located next to a billboard displaying the corporate symbol and a cityscape again featuring the tower. In addition, a hawk flies over the head of the corporate friend when he is walking down the street.

Che Guevara, an iconic revolutionary, is referenced in the video when an image of Guevara's face appears on a man's T-shirt while the oppressed friend is rallying a crowd. Another reference is to the Abu Ghraib tortures during the Iraq War, seen in a flashing image identical to the iconic photograph of prisoner Abdou Hussain Saad Faleh.

== Chart performance ==
On May 17, 2008, the song peaked at number 3 on the Billboard Modern Rock Tracks. Fueled by radio airplay, including six straight weeks at the top of KROQ's most played list, it was the first single since Semisonic's "Closing Time" to chart in the top ten so quickly.

"Handlebars" also performed well on the Billboard charts. Peaking at number three on the Modern Rock Tracks chart, number twenty-two on the Hot Digital Songs chart, number thirty-five on the Pop 100 chart, number thirty-seven on the Hot 100 chart, number sixty-three on the Canadian Hot 100.

On September 7, 2008, the song entered the UK Singles Chart at number 35 on downloads alone and peaked at number 14.

== Track listing ==
Compact Disc:

1. "Handlebars" – 3:27
2. "Rise" – 4:10

7-inch vinyl:

1. "Handlebars" – 3:27
2. "Handlebars" (DJ Shadow Remix) – 4:03

== Personnel ==
Flobots:

- Jamie "Jonny 5" Laurie – vocals
- Brer Rabbit – vocals
- Jesse Walker – electric bass
- Andy "Rok" Guerrero – guitar
- Mackenzie Roberts – viola
- Kenny Ortiz – drums

Guest musicians:

- Joe Ferrone – trumpet

== Charts ==
=== Weekly charts ===
Weekly chart performance for "Handlebars"
Chart (2008)	Peak position
Canada Hot 100 (Billboard)	63
New Zealand (Recorded Music NZ)	26
UK Singles (Official Charts)	14
US Billboard Hot 100	37
US Alternative Airplay (Billboard)	3
US Pop Airplay (Billboard)	30

=== Year-end charts ===
Year-end chart performance for "Handlebars"
Chart (2008)	Position
UK Singles (OCC)	134
US Alternative Airplay (Billboard)	21

== Certifications ==
Certifications for "Handlebars"
Region	Certification	Certified units/sales
United Kingdom (BPI)	Silver	200,000^{‡}
United States (RIAA)	Platinum	1,000,000^{^}
^{^} Shipments figures based on certification alone.^{‡} Sales+streaming figures based on certification alone.

== Release history ==
Release dates and formats for "Handlebars"
Region	Date	Format	Label(s)	Ref.
United States	May 27, 2008	Mainstream airplay	Universal Republic	
