= Waylon =

- Gender: Male
- Language: Old English, Old Norse

Origin
- Meaning: Land by the road, Land beside the wayside

Waylon is a given name.

== People with the name ==
- Waylon (singer) (born Willem Bijkerk in 1980), Dutch singer
- Waylon Brown (born 1979), American politician from Iowa
- Waylon Francis (born 1990), Costa Rican footballer
- Waylon Jennings (1937–2002), American country singer, songwriter and musician
- Shooter Jennings (born 1979), American singer-songwriter, son of the above, born Waylon Albright Jennings
- Waylon Lowe (born 1980), American mixed martial artist
- Waylon Muller, Marshall Islands wrestler
- Waylon Murray (born 1986), South African rugby union player
- Waylon Payne (born 1972), American country singer, songwriter, musician and actor
- Waylon Prather (born 1985), American football coach and former punter
- Waylon Reavis (born 1978), American singer
- Waylon Woolcock (born 1982), South African mountain biker

== Fictional characters ==
- Waylon Smithers, a character from The Simpsons
- Waylon Jeepers, a villain from Freakazoid!
- Waylon Park, the protagonist in the DLC of Outlast, Outlast: Whistleblower
- Killer Croc (Waylon Jones), a supervillain from DC Comics
