= Stanfour =

German rock band

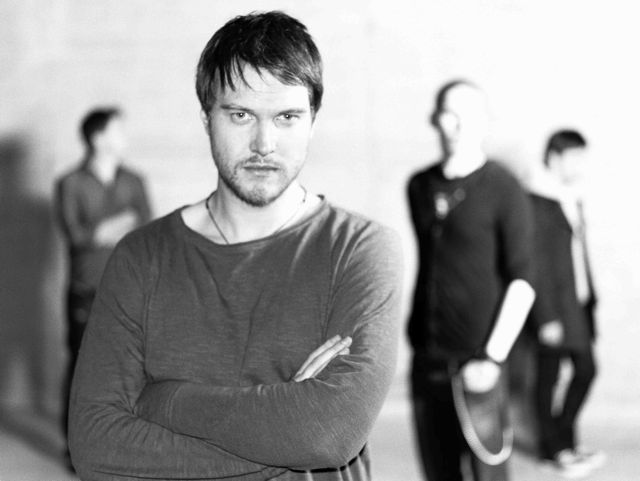

Background information
- Origin: Wyk auf Föhr, Germany
- Genres: Pop rock, Alternative rock, Pop punk
- Years active: 2004–present
- Label: Vertigo Berlin
- Members: Alexander Rethwisch (vocals, keyboard); Konstantin Rethwisch (vocals); Christian Lidsba (guitar); Live and session support: Christoph Spangenberg (keys); Heiko Fischer (guitar); Daniel Stritzke (bass); Paul Kaiser (drums)
- Past members: Eike Lüchow
- Website: www.stanfour.com

Stanfour are a German rock band who formed in 2004. The band was founded on the German island of Föhr where the four core members live. Already prior to the band's formation, brothers Alexander and Konstantin Rethwisch spent years in Los Angeles working closely together with a producer of film music. This is one of several reasons for the band's American style of music.

== History ==
The name Stanfour was also created in the US, when the four musicians frequented a café. On Konstantin's cup was written "Stan" (abbreviation of his name). After a conversation with the waitress, the latter suggested Stanfour as a band name and as the group did not have a name at the time, they accepted it and have since kept the name Stanfour.

In September 2007 they released their debut single "Do it all" which entered the German charts at No. 46. Their second single "For all Lovers" was chosen as theme song for the Sat. 1 TV show Nur die Liebe zählt and stayed in the German charts for 18 weeks. The third single is called "Desperate". Their first album Wild Life was released on 29 February 2008. It was mainly recorded in Stockholm, Sweden, and in the band's studio on Föhr, but also in Los Angeles.

Stanfour toured with John Fogerty and the Backstreet Boys and played on shows with Bryan Adams, Daughtry and OneRepublic. In September 2008 a club tour was started in Germany. In November 2008 they were nominated in the "Best Newcomer" category for the EinsLive Krone music award in Germany.

During October and November 2009 they toured through Germany as opening acts for a-ha's Foot of the Mountain tour. In December 2009, the second album Rise and Fall, produced and recorded entirely by Stanfour, was published. The band has grown and their sound has become slightly more electronical and lighter. The first single "Wishing you Well" from this album reached No. 10 of the German charts. The title "Tired Again" is also featured in Til Schweiger's 2009 film Zweiohrküken.

In 2010, the album Rise and Fall reached gold status in Germany for 100,000 shipped copies. Stanfour represented Schleswig-Holstein with their song "Sail on" in the 2010 Bundesvision Song Contest and reached rank 7 in the competition.

In November 2011, founding member Eike Lüchow left the band to focus on other musical projects.

Stanfour released a new single entitled "Learning to Breathe" on 27 April 2012. Their third studio album October Sky was released in Germany on 11 May 2012. It is more electronic and experimental than the band's earlier works and has been compared to the music of Coldplay.

Stanfour are featured on the ATB song "Face to Face" which is on his 2014 album Contact.

== Discography ==
=== Albums ===
Title	Album details	Peak chart positions			Certifications
Title	Album details	GER	AUT	SWI	Certifications
Wild Life	Released: 29 February 2008; Label: Vertigo Berlin (Universal); Format: CD, Digital download	53	—	92	
Rise and Fall	Released: 4 December 2009; Label: We Love Music (Universal); Format: CD, Digital download	9	36	20	GER: Gold
October Sky	Released: 11 May 2012; Label: We Love Music (Universal); Format: CD, Digital download	9	49	36	
IIII	Released: 28 August 2015; Label: We Love Music (Universal); Format: CD, Digital download	36	—	—	
"—" denotes a recording that failed to chart or was not released in that territory.

=== Compilation albums ===
Title	Album details	Peak chart positions		
Title	Album details	GER	AUT	SWI
Fireworks-Best of Stanfour	Released: 23 September 2016; Label: We Love Music (Universal); Format: CD, Digital download	—	—	—
"—" denotes a recording that failed to chart or was not released in that territory.

=== Singles ===
Title	Year	Peak chart positions			Album
Title	Year	GER	AUT	SWI	Album
"Do It All"	2007	46	—	—	Wild Life
"For All Lovers"	2007	24	62	94	Wild Life
"Desperate"	2008	55	—	—	Wild Life
"In Your Arms" (featuring Jill)	2008	14	26	21	Wild Life
"Wishing You Well"	2009	10	31	48	Rise and Fall
"Life Without You" (featuring Esmée Denters)	2010	25	51	58	Rise and Fall
"Wouldn't Change a Thing" (Demi Lovato) featuring Stanfour	2010	28	36	—	Camp Rock 2: The Final Jam Soundtrack (German edition)
"Sail On"	2010	52	—	—	Rise and Fall
"Learning to Breathe"	2012	45	—	—	October Sky
"Power Games" (featuring Natasha Bedingfield)	2015	—	—	—	IIII
"—" denotes a recording that failed to chart or was not released in that territory
