= Tennman Records =

- Founded: 2007
- Founder: Justin Timberlake
- Defunct: 2013
- Distributor(s): Interscope Geffen A&M
- Genre: Various
- Country of origin: United States
- Location: Los Angeles, California

Tennman Records was an American record label created as a joint venture between Justin Timberlake and Interscope Records.

== History ==
The label was announced in a press release dated May 28, 2007.

"We are all excited about the talent we have to offer already on our roster and I cannot wait to introduce the world to my new discoveries," Timberlake said in a statement.

Ten-time Grammy Award winner Justin Timberlake serves as the company's Chairman and Chief Executive Officer. Justin sets the company's creative direction and is actively involved in all phases of the label's operations.

Andre Person serves as the company's President. Navin Watumull serves as the company's General Manager/Vice President of A&R.

Dutch YouTube celebrity Esmée Denters was the first artist to be signed to the new label. On June 6, 2007, the company announced she would be opening for Justin Timberlake at six venues during his 2007 European tour.

== Roster ==
- FreeSol

== Albums ==
- Esmée Denters - Outta Here (2009)
- Matt Morris - When Everything Breaks Open (2010)
