= Shaun Reynolds (musician) =

- Birth name: Shaun Daniel Reynolds
- Genres: Pop
- Occupation(s): Producer, artist, songwriter
- Website: www.shaunreynoldsmusic.com

Shaun Reynolds (born: Shaun Daniel Reynolds) is a British music producer, singer & songwriter, who became famous through his online posts on YouTube.

In 2013, Reynolds made his major-label writing debut on Tyler Ward's Honestly album with the track "The Way We Are".

Shaun released a joint pop/hip-hop project in 2017 with friend and colleague Black Prez called 'Play This at a Party'. The lead single 'Up All Night' hit a million streams on Spotify organically.

== Discography ==
=== Writing Credits ===
Year	Album	Peak positions	Notes
Year	Album	US	Notes
2012	The Way We Are: Release date:28 January 2012; Label: Shaun Reynolds Music	-	Track list: "Starships" (2:48); "Daylight" (Shaun Version) (3:57); "Both of Us" (3:40); "Stay" (feat. Laura Pringle) (4:02); "The Way We Are" (feat. Songs With Friends, Jono, Derek Ward & Elise Lieberth) (3:49); "Rockstar" (feat. Ebony Day) (3:33); "Stand Up" (feat. Lauren Verrier) (3:40); "Beneath Your Beautiful" (feat. Laura Pringle) (4:19); "Space Bound" (feat. Lauren Verrier) (4:01); "When It Rains (feat. Oli Reynolds) (3:26)

=== Singles ===
Year	Single	Peak positions	Album
Year	Single	SWE	Album
2013	"Stay" (featuring Laura Pringle)	34	The Way We Are

=== Writing Credits ===
Year	Song	Artist	Album
2013	The Way We Are	Tyler Ward	Honestly
