= Editors discography =

Band discography

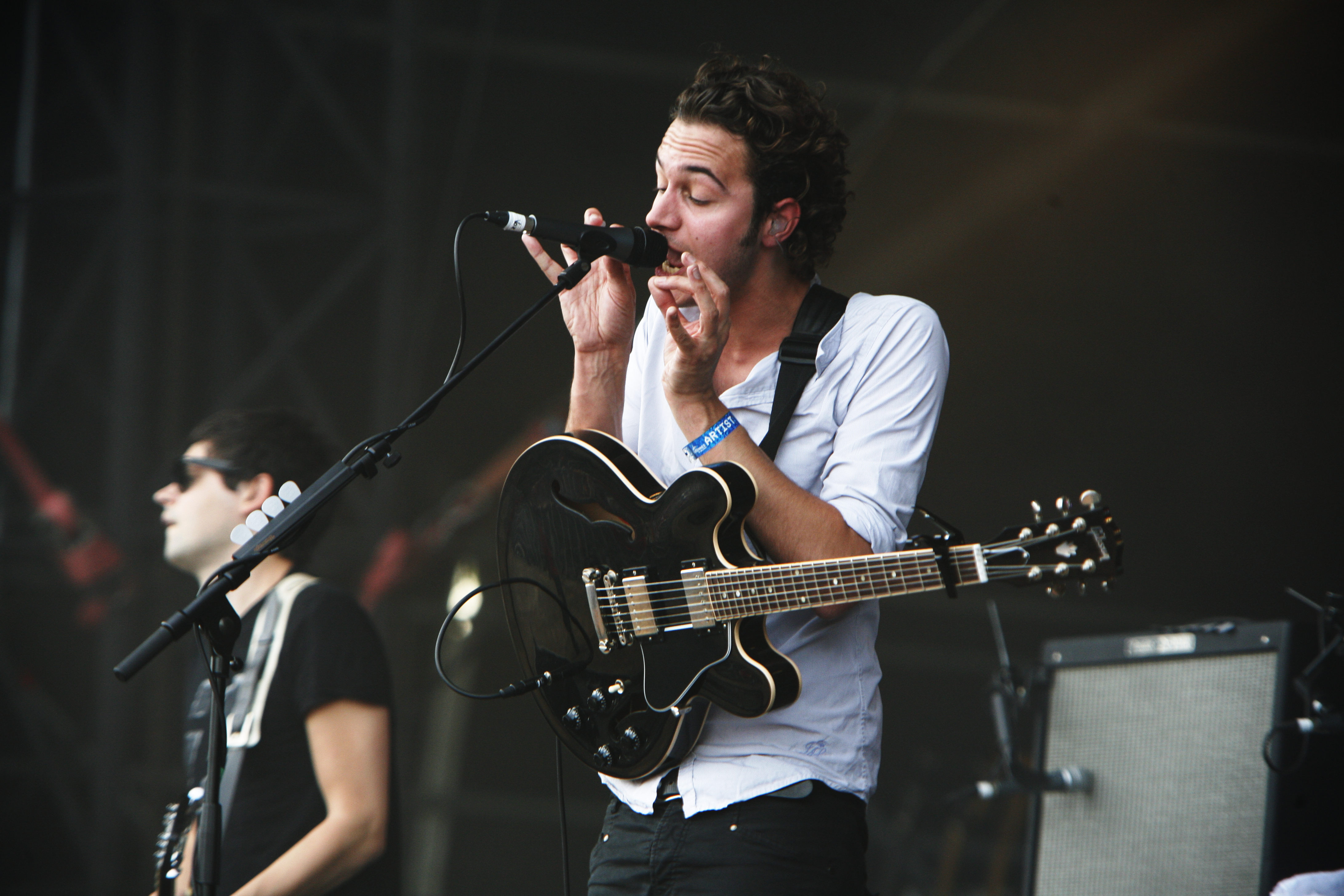
- Editors performing in 2007
- Studio albums: 8
- Extended plays: 5
- Compilation albums: 5
- Singles: 40
- Music videos: 23

Editors are a British indie rock band based in Birmingham, who formed in 2002. Previously known as Pilot and "The Pride", the band consists of Tom Smith (lead vocals, rhythm guitar, piano), Russell Leetch (bass guitar and live backing vocals), Ed Lay (drums, percussion and live backing vocals), Justin Lockey (lead guitar), and Elliott Williams (keyboards and synthesizers).

Editors have so far released two platinum studio albums, selling over 2 million copies between them worldwide. Their debut album The Back Room was released in 2005. It contained hits such as "Munich" and "Blood" and the following year received a Mercury Prize nomination. Their follow-up album An End Has a Start went to number 1 in the UK Albums Chart in June 2007 and earned the band a Brit Awards nomination for best British Band. It also spawned another Top 10 hit single with the release of "Smokers Outside the Hospital Doors".

Their third studio album, In This Light and On This Evening, was released in October 2009 and debuted at number one on the UK Albums Chart.

== Albums ==
=== Studio albums ===
Title	Album details	Peak chart positions										Sales	Certifications (sales thresholds)
Title	Album details	UK	BEL (FL)	BEL (WA)	FRA	GER	IRL	ITA	NLD	SWI	US	Sales	Certifications (sales thresholds)
The Back Room	Released: 25 July 2005; Label: Kitchenware; Format: CD, 2CD, vinyl, digital download	2	53	74	107	—	23	—	30	—	— (Note: The Back Room did not enter the US Billboard 200, but peaked at number 14 on the US Heatseekers Albums Chart.)	UK: 560,278	BPI: Platinum; BEA: Gold; IRMA: Gold; NVPI: Gold
An End Has a Start	Released: 25 June 2007; Label: Kitchenware; Format: CD, vinyl, digital download	1	5	45	56	24	7	47	2	31	117	UK: 383,369	BPI: Platinum; BEA: Gold; IRMA: Gold
In This Light and on This Evening	Released: 12 October 2009; Label: Kitchenware; Format: CD, 2CD, vinyl, digital download	1	2	7	41	8	4	20	3	12	— (Note: In This Light and on This Evening did not enter the US Billboard 200, but peaked at number 8 on the US Heatseekers Albums Chart.)	UK: 142,574	BPI: Gold; BEA: Platinum
The Weight of Your Love	Released: 28 June 2013; Label: PIAS; Format: CD, 2CD, vinyl, digital download	6	1	4	39	4	9	9	1	4	— (Note: The Weight of Your Love did not enter the US Billboard 200, but peaked at number 17 on the US Heatseekers Albums Chart.)		BPI: Silver; BEA: Gold
In Dream	Released: 2 October 2015; Label: PIAS; Format: CD, 2CD, vinyl, digital download	5	1	5	47	11	14	11	1	7	— (Note: In Dream did not enter the US Billboard 200, but peaked at number 9 on the US Heatseekers Albums Chart.)		BEA: Gold; NVPI: Gold
Violence	Released: 9 March 2018; Label: PIAS; Format: CD, vinyl, digital download	6	1	3	49	6	20	24	2	10	— (Note: Violence did not enter the US Billboard 200, but peaked at number 13 on the US Heatseekers Albums Chart.)		
EBM	Released: 23 September 2022; Label: PIAS; Formats: CD, vinyl, digital download	10	2	6	122	6	—	97	2	10	—		
Surface, Echo & Sound	Released: 30 October 2026; Label: PIAS; Formats: CD, vinyl, digital download	7	1	6	—	7	—	75	5	7	—		
"—" denotes a recording that did not chart or was not released in that territory.

=== Compilation albums ===
Title	Album details	Peak chart positions									
Title	Album details	UK	BEL (FL)	BEL (WA)	FRA	GER	IRL	ITA	NLD	SPA	SWI
Black Gold: Best of Editors	Released: 25 October 2019; Label: PIAS; Formats: CD, 2CD, digital download, vinyl	28	2	18	115	21	72	61	8	44	94
You Are Fading IV	Released: 26 April 2020; Formats: Digital download, streaming	—	—	—	—	—	—	—	—	—	—
You Are Fading III	Released: 27 April 2020; Formats: Digital download, streaming	—	—	—	—	—	—	—	—	—	—
You Are Fading II	Released: 17 May 2020; Formats: Digital download, streaming	—	—	—	—	—	—	—	—	—	—
You Are Fading I	Released: 8 June 2020; Formats: Digital download, streaming	—	—	—	—	—	—	—	—	—	—
"—" denotes a recording that did not chart or was not released in that territory.

=== Box sets ===
Title	Album details
Unedited	Released: 28 March 2011; Label: Kitchenware Records; Formats: CD, digital download, vinyl

== EPs ==
Title	EP details	Peak chart positions								
Title	EP details	UK Sales	UK Indie	AUT	BEL (FL)	BEL (WA)	GER	NLD	SCO	SWI
Snowfield Demo EP	Released: 2003; Re-released: 25 October 2019; Self-released as Snowfield; Label: PIAS (re-release); Formats: CD	—	—	—	—	—	—	—	—	—
Napster EP (Live Session)	Released: 27 March 2006; Label: Kitchenware; Formats: Digital download	—	—	—	—	—	—	—	—	—
Live At Telekom Street Gigs, Frankfurt	Released: 14 August 2013; Label: PIAS; Formats: Digital download, streaming	—	—	—	—	—	—	—	—	—
Spotify Session - Live At Spotify Madrid	Released: 7 October 2013; Label: PIAS; Formats: Digital download, streaming	—	—	—	—	—	—	—	—	—
The Blanck Mass Sessions	Released: 3 April 2019; Label: PIAS; Formats: CD, digital download, vinyl, streaming	34	12	67	13	109	53	36	50	90
"—" denotes a recording that did not chart or was not released in that territory.

== Singles ==
Title	Year	Peak chart positions										Certifications	Album
Title	Year	UK	AUT	BEL (FL)	BEL (WA)	FRA	GER	IRL	NLD	POL	SWI	Certifications	Album
"Bullets" (Note: "Bullets" originally peaked at 54 on the UK singles chart before being re-issued on 26 September 2005.)	2005	27	—	—	—	—	—	—	—	—	—		The Back Room
"Munich" (Note: "Munich" originally peaked at 22 on the UK singles chart before being re-issued on 2 January 2006.)	2005	10	—	—	—	—	—	42	97	—	—	BPI: Silver	The Back Room
"Blood" (Note: "Blood" was re-issued on 19 June 2006 and re-entered the UK singles chart at #39.)	2005	18	—	—	—	—	—	—	—	—	—		The Back Room
"All Sparks"	2006	21	—	—	—	—	82	—	—	—	—		The Back Room
"Smokers Outside the Hospital Doors"	2007	7	—	47	— (Note: "Smokers Outside the Hospital Doors" did not enter the Wallonia Ultratop 50, but peaked at number 7 on the Ultratip chart.)	—	—	39	89	31	—		An End Has a Start
"An End Has a Start"	2007	27	—	— (Note: "An End Has a Start" did not enter the Flanders Ultratop 50, but peaked at number 3 on the Ultratip chart.)	—	—	88	—	90	—	—		An End Has a Start
"The Racing Rats"	2007	26	—	36	— (Note: "The Racing Rats" did not enter the Wallonia Ultratop 50, but peaked at number 12 on the Ultratip chart.)	—	—	—	20	35	—		An End Has a Start
"Push Your Head Towards the Air"	2008	—	—	—	—	—	—	—	—	—	—		An End Has a Start
"Bones" (Note: "Bones" was released as a digital download only.)	2008	—	—	— (Note: "Bones" did not enter the Flanders Ultratop 50, but peaked at number 10 on the Ultratip chart.)	—	—	—	—	—	22	—		An End Has a Start
"Papillon"	2009	23	44	1	6	—	43	—	16	1	52	BEA: Gold	In This Light and On This Evening
"You Don't Know Love"	2010	—	—	— (Note: "You Don't Know Love" did not enter the Flanders Ultratop 50, but peaked at number 7 on the Ultratip chart.)	—	—	—	—	—	15	—		In This Light and On This Evening
"Last Day" (Note: "Last Day" was a limited release as part of Record Store Day in April 2010.)	2010	— (Note: "Last Day" did not enter the UK Singles Chart, but peaked at number 23 on the UK Physical Singles Chart Top 100.)	—	—	—	79	—	—	—	—	—		Non-album single
"Eat Raw Meat = Blood Drool"	2010	—	—	—	—	—	—	—	—	—	—		In This Light and On This Evening
"No Sound But the Wind" (Note: The live version of "No Sound But the Wind" recorded at Rock Werchter festival in Belgium in 2010 was the version released as a single.)	2010	—	—	1	37	—	—	—	72	—	—	BEA: Platinum	In This Light and On This Evening
"A Ton of Love"	2013	— (Note: "A Ton of Love" did not enter the UK Singles Chart, but peaked at number 7 on the UK Physical Singles Chart Top 100.)	—	32	— (Note: "A Ton of Love" did not enter the Wallonia Ultratop 50, but peaked at number 32 on the Ultratip chart.)	—	—	—	54	50	— (Note: "A Ton of Love" did not enter the Swiss Singles chart, but charted at number 85 on the Swiss Airplay chart.)		The Weight of Your Love
"Formaldehyde"	2013	— (Note: "Formaldehyde" did not enter the UK Singles Chart, but peaked at number 65 on the UK Physical Singles Chart.)	—	— (Note: "Formaldehyde" did not enter the Flanders Ultratop 50, but peaked at number 5 on the Ultratip chart.)	—	—	—	—	—	28	—		The Weight of Your Love
"Honesty"	2013	—	—	— (Note: "Honesty" did not enter the Flanders Ultratop 50, but peaked at number 3 on the Ultratip chart.)	—	—	—	—	—	38	—		The Weight of Your Love
"Sugar"	2014	—	—	— (Note: "Sugar" did not enter the Flanders Ultratop 50, but peaked at number 4 on the Ultratip chart.)	—	—	—	—	—	18	—		The Weight of Your Love
"What Is This Thing Called Love"	2014	—	—	— (Note: "What Is This Thing Called Love" did not enter the Flanders Ultratop 50, but peaked at number 7 on the Ultratip chart.)	—	—	—	—	—	—	—		The Weight of Your Love
"No Harm"	2015	—	—	— (Note: "No Harm" did not enter the Flanders Ultratop 50, but peaked at number 66 on the Ultratip chart.)	—	—	—	—	—	—	—		In Dream
"Marching Orders"	2015	—	—	—	—	—	—	—	—	—	—		In Dream
"Life Is a Fear"	2015	—	—	40	— (Note: "Life Is a Fear" did not enter the Wallonia Ultratop 50, but peaked at number 35 on the Ultratip chart.)	—	—	—	— (Note: "Life Is a Fear" did not enter the Netherlands' Single Top 100 but peaked on the Netherlands' Single Tip Chart at number 28.)	48	—		In Dream
"Ocean of Night"	2015	—	—	— (Note: "Ocean of Night" did not enter the Flanders Ultratop 50, but peaked at number 1 on the Ultratip chart.)	— (Note: "Ocean of Night" did not enter the Wallonia Ultratop 50, but peaked as an "extra tip" on the Ultratip chart.)	—	—	—	—	41	—		In Dream
"Forgiveness"	2016	—	—	— (Note: "Forgiveness" did not enter the Flanders Ultratop 50, but peaked at number 46 on the Ultratip chart.)	—	—	—	—	—	—	—		In Dream
"All the Kings"	2016	—	—	47	—	—	—	—	—	31	—		In Dream
"Magazine"	2018	—	—	— (Note: "Magazine" did not enter the Flanders Ultratop 50, but peaked at number 1 on the Ultratip chart.)	— (Note: "Magazine" did not enter the Wallonia Ultratop 50, but peaked at number 30 on the Ultratip chart.)	—	—	—	—	50	—		Violence
"Hallelujah (So Low)"	2018	—	—	—	—	—	—	—	—	45	—		Violence
"Darkness at the Door"	2018	—	—	— (Note: "Darkness at the Door" did not enter the Flanders Ultratop 50, but peaked at number 20 on the Ultratip chart.)	—	—	—	—	—	55	—		Violence
"Cold"	2018	—	—	— (Note: "Cold" did not enter the Flanders Ultratop 50, but peaked at number 29 on the Ultratip chart.)	— (Note: "Cold" did not enter the Wallonia Ultratop 50, but peaked as an "extra tip" on the Ultratip chart.)	—	—	—	—	55	—		Violence
"Barricades"	2019	—	—	— (Note: "Barricades" did not enter the Flanders Ultratop 50, but peaked at number 30 on the Ultratip chart.)	—	—	—	—	—	—	—		The Blanck Mass Sessions
"Frankenstein"	2019	—	—	— (Note: "Frankenstein" did not enter the Flanders Ultratop 50, but peaked as an "extra tip" on the Ultratip chart.)	—	—	—	—	—	—	—		Black Gold
"Black Gold"	2019	—	—	— (Note: "Black Gold" did not enter the Flanders Ultratop 50, but peaked at number 32 on the Ultratip chart.)	—	—	—	—	—	—	—		Black Gold
"Upside Down"	2020	—	—	— (Note: "Upside Down" did not enter the Flanders Ultratop 50, but peaked at number 30 on the Ultratip chart.)	—	—	—	—	—	—	—		Black Gold
"Heart Attack"	2022	—	—	—	—	—	—	—	—	—	—		EBM
"Karma Climb"	2022	—	—	—	—	—	—	—	—	—	—		EBM
"Kiss"	2022	—	—	—	—	—	—	—	—	—	—		EBM
"Vibe"	2022	—	—	—	—	—	—	—	—	—	—		EBM
"Call It In"	2026	—	—	—	—	—	—	—	—	—	—		Surface, Echo & Sound
"The Rush"	2026	—	—	—	—	—	—	—	—	—	—		Surface, Echo & Sound
"Seriously"	2026	—	—	—	—	—	—	—	—	—	—		Surface, Echo & Sound
"—" denotes a recording that did not chart or was not released in that territory.

== Other appearances ==
Title	Year	Album
"No Sound But the Wind"	2009	The Twilight Saga: New Moon OST

== Music videos ==
Year	Song	Director
2005	"Bullets" (version 1)	Mike Brady
2005	"Munich"	Mark Thomas
2005	"Blood"	Chris Hopewell & Matt Freeth
2005	"Bullets" (version 2)	Martin de Thurah
2006	"All Sparks"	Lee Lennox
2007	"Smokers Outside the Hospital Doors"	Arni & Kinski
2007	"An End Has a Start"	Diane Martel
2007	"The Racing Rats"	Vince Haycock
2008	"Push Your Head Towards the Air"	Paul Minor
2008	"Bones"	Russell Leetch
2009	"Papillon"	Andrew Douglas
2010	"You Don't Know Love"	Arni & Kinski
2010	"Last Day"	
2010	"Eat Raw Meat = Blood Drool"	Lennox Brothers
2010	"No Sound but the Wind"	
2013	"A Ton of Love"	Mark Thomas
2013	"Formaldehyde"	Ben Wheatley
2013	"Honesty"	Favourite Colour: Black
2014	"Sugar"	Joe Vanhoutteghem
2014	"What Is This Thing Called Love"	
2015	"No Harm"	Rahi Rezvani
2015	"Marching Orders"	Rahi Rezvani
2015	"Life Is a Fear"	Rahi Rezvani
2015	"Ocean of Night"	Rahi Rezvani
2016	"All the Kings"	Rahi Rezvani
2018	"Magazine"	Rahi Rezvani
2018	"Hallelujah (So Low)"	Rahi Rezvani
2018	"Darkness at the Door"	Rahi Rezvani
2018	"Cold"	Rahi Rezvani
2019	"Barricades"	Hi-sim
2019	"Frankenstein"	Gregory Ohrel
2019	"Black Gold"	Rahi Rezvani
2022	"Heart Attack"	Felix Geen
2022	"Karma Climb"	Justin Lockey & James Lockey
2022	"Kiss"	Justin Lockey & James Lockey
2022	"Picturesque"	Ellie Madeland
2026	"Call It In"	Justin Lockey
