= Best Art Vinyl =

Annual award for album cover art

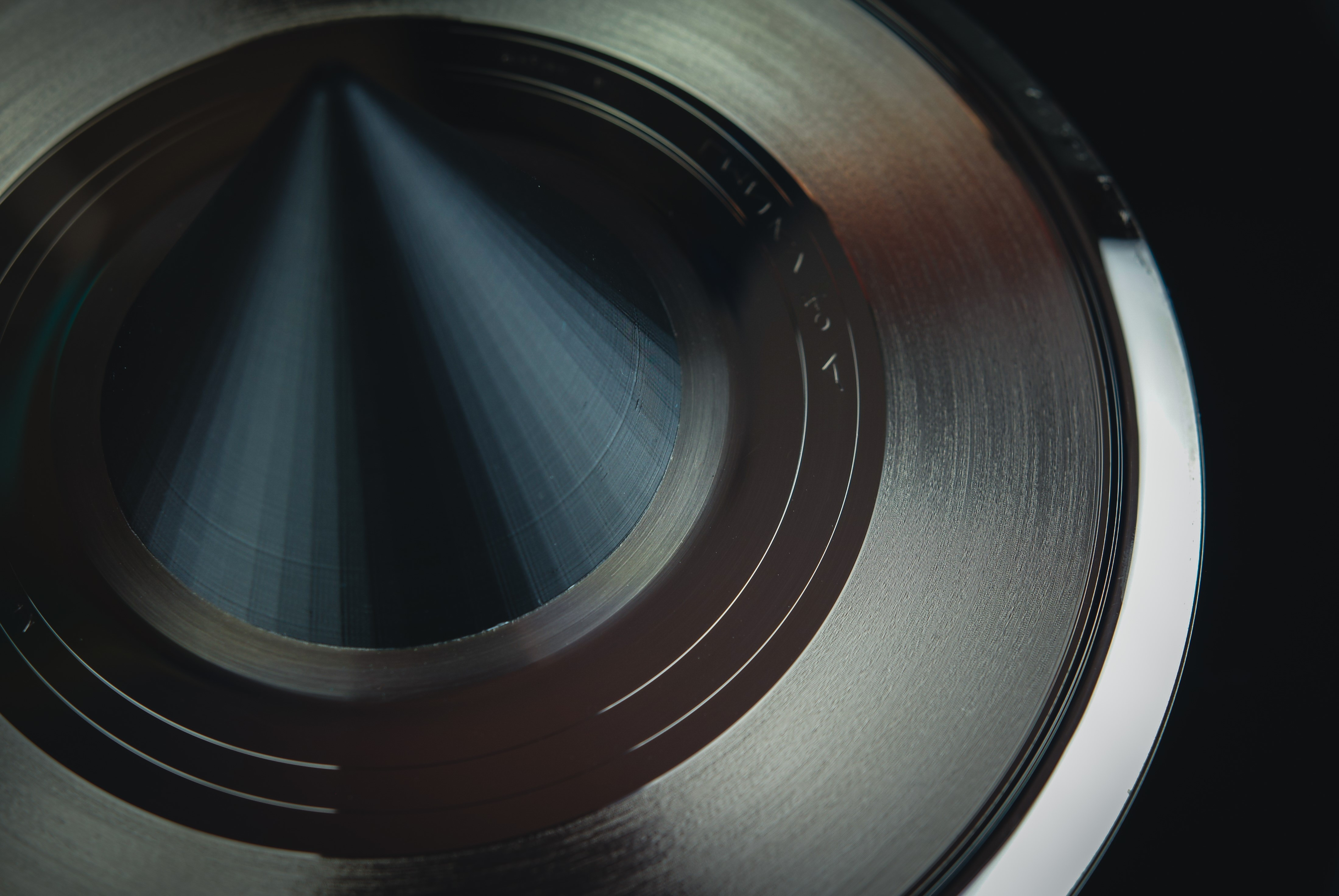
Best Art Vinyl Award

Best Art Vinyl is an annual award established in 2005. It celebrates artists and designers of album cover art. The nomination process begins in November, and the winners are announced in January, and exhibited at venues across the United Kingdom and Europe. The 50 shortlisted records and winners are selected by an expert judging panel from the art and music industries and are displayed using Art Vinyl's unique Play & Display Flip Frame.

== 2025 winners ==
Rank	Musical artist	Album	Cover artist
1	Self Esteem	Complicated Woman	Photography by Scarlett Carlos Clarke
2	Perfume Genius	Glory	Photography by Cody Critcheloe (SSION)
3	Smote	Songs from the Free House	Artwork by Célestin Krier
4	David Byrne	Who Is The Sky?	Design by David Byrne, Shira Inbar
5	Little Simz	Lotus	Cover art by Jeremy Ngatho Cole. Cover photography by Marco Grey
6	Lorde	Virgin	Photography by Heji Shin
7	Mark Pritchard & Thom Yorke	Tall Tales	Artwork by Jonathan Zawada
8	Hot Chip	Joy In Repetition	Artwork by Peter Blake. Photography by Clive Robinson. Design & layout by Matthew Cooper
9	Squid	Cowards	Photography by Tonje Tielsen. Design by Ben Sifel
10	Aesop Rock	Black Hole Superette	Artwork and layout by Justin Coro Kaufman

== 2024 winners ==
Rank	Musical artist	Album	Cover artist
1	Hiatus Kaiyote	Love Heart Cheat Code	Creative Direction by Hiatus Kaiyote & Grey Ghost. Cover art by Rajni Perera. Symbol art by Chloe Biocca. Product Design by Sean Preston
2	Fontaines D.C.	Romance	Cover images by Lulu Lin. Design & Art Direction by Texas Maragh & Carlos O’Connell. Photography by Theo Cottle
3	Carlita	Sentimental	Cover photography by Louis Browne
4	Geordie Greep	The New Sound	Cover artwork by Toshio Saeki. Art Direction Geordie Greep. Layout by Philip Laslett.
5	Future Islands	People Who Aren't There Anymore	Cover art by Beedallo. Design & Creative Direction by Nolen Štrāls
6	Oh Hiroshima	All Things Shining	Artwork by Wilson Trouve
7	Naima Bock	Below A Massive Dark Land	Art by Naima Bock
8	Sam Morton	Daffodils & Dirt	Cover image by Nick Waplington
9	Rosali	Bite Down	Cover Photo by Asia Harman
10	Anna Calvi	Peaky Blinders: Season 5 & 6 Original Score	Artwork illustrations by Karl Fitzgerald. Design by Matthew Cooper

== 2023 winners ==
Rank	Musical artist	Album	Cover artist
1	PJ Harvey	I Inside the Old Year Dying	Art Director, design and front cover photography by Michelle Henning. Additional design and typesetting by Rob Crane
2	Gabriels	Angels and Queens Part 2	Photography by Melodie McDaniel.
3	Sub Focus	Evolve	Art Direction by Mat Maitland from Big Active Design & Nicolaas Douwma. Artificial Intelligence by Claudia Rafael. Design by Mat Maitland - Big Active Design
4	Roisin Murphy	Hit Parade	Creative Direction by Róisín Murphy. Art by Beth Frey. Design by Bráulio Amado. Photography by Connor Egan. Production by Object & Animal
5	Alison Goldfrapp	The Love Invention	Photography and Design by Mat Maitland - Big Active Design
6	Skrillex	Quest For Fire	Artwork by Alfred Pietroni
7	Orbital	Optical Delusion	Artwork by John Greenwood
8	Young Fathers	Heavy Heavy	Design by Hingston Studio
9	Lonely The Brave	What We Do To Feel	Artwork by True Spilt Milk Design
10	Oneohtrix Point Never	Again	Designed by @eccopn & @onlineceramics Sculpture by @ringlund_instat

== 2022 winners ==
Rank	Musical artist	Album	Cover artist
1	Black Country, New Road	Ants From Up There	Artwork by Simon Monk. Design by Ninja Tune
2	Birds In Row	Gris Klein	Artwork by Bart Balboa.
3	Richard Dawson	The Ruby Cord	Artwork by Jake Blanchard Additional Design by Matthew Cooper
4	Arctic Monkeys	The Car	Photography by Matt Helders. Design by Matthew Cooper and Alex Turner
5	Black Midi	Hellfire	Design by David Rudnick
6	Bonobo	Fragments	Artwork by Neil Krug. Design by Mat Maitland at Big Active
7	Dry Cleaning	Stumpwork	Photography and design by Annie Collinge. Creative Direction and styling by Rottingdean Bazaar
8	Stealing Sheep	Wow Machine	Artwork by Barbarian Flower
9	Rammstein	Zeit	Photography by Brian Adams
10	Malevolence	Malicious Intent	Artwork by Eliran Kantor

== 2021 winners ==
Rank	Musical artist	Album	Cover artist
1	Villagers	Fever Dreams	Artwork by Paul Phillips at True Spilt Milk Designs. Design by Matthew Cooper, assisted by Paul J Street
2	Duran Duran	Future Past	Photography Daisuke Yokota. Art Direction Rory McCartney
3	Thunder	All the Right Noises	Cover photo by Jason Joyce. Design by Neel Panchal
4	Mogwai	As the Love Continues	Design by DLT
5	Gruff Rhys	Seeking New Gods	Design and Art Direction by Mark James
6	Shire T	Tomorrow's People	Artwork and Design by Alexander Brown
7	Amyl and the Sniffers	Comfort to Me	Artwork by Bráulio Amado
8	Lost Horizons	In Quiet Moments	Cover photography by Jacques-Henri Lartigue
9	Balthazar	Sand	Homunculus Loxodontus, a statue by Dutch artist Margriet Van Breevoort. Art Director Annelise Keestra
10	The Vaccines	Back in Love City	Artwork by Seerlight

== 2020 winners ==
Rank	Musical artist	Album	Artist
1	IDLES	Ultra Mono	Painting by Russell Oliver
2	Nick Mason's Saucerful of Secrets	Live at the Roundhouse	Design by Chris Peyton for VVVOID
3	Doves	The Universal Want	Photography by Maria Lax
4	Tame Impala	The Slow Rush	Photography and design by Neil Krug. Art concept by Kevin Parker and Neil Krug
5	Courteeners	More. Again. Forever.	Cover art by Laura Fray
6	Bibio	Sleep On the Wing	Illustration and linocut print by Chris Wormell
7	Rick Wakeman (and the English Ensemble)	The Red Planet	Cover design by Martin Robert Cook
8	Oneohtrix Point Never	Magic	Design by Robert Beatty
9	Tenderlonious	Quarantena	Artwork and design by Theo Ackroyd
10	Taylor Swift	Folklore	Photography by Beth Garrabrant

== 2019 winners ==
Rank	Musical artist	Album	Artist	Ref.
1	Klone	Le Grand Voyage	Artist and Photographer: Francesco Dell'Orto	
2	Nick Cave and the Bad Seeds	Ghosteen	Artist: Tom DuBois; Designers: Hingston Studio and Nick Cave	
3	Efterklang	Altid Sammen	Designers and Art Directors: Hvass&Hannibal	
4	XOA	Way West		
5	Baroness	Gold & Grey	Artist: John Baizley	
6	808 State	Transmission Suite	Artist: Vasim Bhatti; Photographers: Michael England, Richard Brook, and Vasim Bhatti	
7	Ultramarine	Meditations	Artist: Heretic and Spectral Nation	
8	Vanishing Twin	The Age of Immunology	Artist: Alex Hornsby; Photographer: Elliott Arndt	
9	Stormzy	Heavy Is the Head	Designer: Hales Curtis	
10	Wovoka Gentle	Start Clanging Cymbals	Artist: Olivia Norris	

== 2018 winners ==
Rank	Musical artist	Album	Artist	Ref.
1	Editors	Violence	Designer: Rahi Rezvani	
2	Young Fathers	Cocoa Sugar	Designer: Tom Hingston	
3	Aphex Twin	Collapse EP	Designers: The Designers Republic	
4	Sandra Kerr and John Faulkner	Music from Bagpuss OST.	Designer: Hannah Alice	
5	Arctic Monkeys	Tranquility Base Hotel & Casino	Designer: Alex Turner	
6	Let's Eat Grandma	I'm All Ears	Designer: Yanjun Cheng	
7	Thom Yorke	Suspiria	Designers: Stanley Donwood and Dr Tchock	
8	Janelle Monáe	Dirty Computer	Designer: Joe Perez	
9	Low	Double Negative	Designer: Peter Liversidge	
10	Peggy Gou	Once	Designer: Jee-ook Choi	

== 2017 winners ==
Rank	Musical artist	Name	Cover artist
1	Run the Jewels	Run the Jewels 3	Art Direction & Photography by Timothy Saccenti Drawing by Nick Gazin Layout by Troy Hahn
2	Father John Misty	Pure Comedy	Art Direction by Sasha Barr Illustrations by Ed Steed
3	Vessels	The Great Distraction	Design by Split
4	Hannah Peel	Mary Casio:Journey to Cassiopeia	Design by Jonathan Barnbrook
5	Lost Horizons	Ojala	Artwork by Marcus Davies Design by Luke Jarvis
6	Blanck Mass	World Eater	Photograph by Carli Davidson Layout by Sacred Bones Design
7	Actress	AZD	Photography by Mehdi Lacoste/Jo Di Studio Creative Direction Darren J Cunnighham/Theresa Adebiyi
8	Gorillaz	Humanz	Design by Jamie Hewlett
9	Julien Baker	Turn Out the Lights	Design by Mike Zimmerman
10	Hater	Red Blinders	Photography by Niklas Wennerstrand Layout by Alex Hornsby & Hater

== 2016 winners ==
Rank	Musical artist	Name	Cover artist
1	The Last Shadow Puppets	Everything You've Come to Expect	Design by Matthew Cooper, photography by Jack Robinson
2	David Bowie	Blackstar	Design by Jonathan Barnbrook
3	Mark Prichard	Under the Sun	Design by Jonathan Zawada
4	Suede	Night Thoughts	Art Direction by Paul Khera, Brett Anderson, Mat Osman, Neil Codling and Didz Hammond. Photography by Lucy Ray
5	White Lies	Friends	Art Direction & Design by Markus Bagå at Big Active Design
6	Red Hot Chili Peppers	The Getaway	Artwork by Kevin Peterson
7	Shura	Nothing's Real	Art Direction and Design Mat Maitland at Big Active Photography by Andrew Whitton Illustration by Louise Pomeroy
8	Kula Shaker	K 2.0	Artwork by Kate Bayley. Design by Stylorouge
9	Leonard Cohen	You Want It Darker	Design by Sammy Slabbinck
10	James Blake	The Colour in Anything	Design by Quentin Blake

== 2015 winners ==
Rank	Musical artist	Name	Cover artist
1	David Gilmour	Rattle that Lock	Dave Stansbie and the Creative Corporation, photography by Rupert Truman
2	Drenge	Undertow	Photography by Donald Milne, design by Matthew Cooper
3	Tame Impala	Currents	Design by Robert Beatty
4	Everything Everything	Get to Heaven	Illustrated by Andrew Archer. Design by Jonny Costello, Adult Art Club.
5	Blur	The Magic Whip	Design by Tony Hung
6	Linden	Rest and Be Thankful	Artwork by Jim Lambie
7	Jamie xx	In Colour	Artwork by Jamie Smith & Phil Lee
8	And So I Watch You From Afar	Heirs	Artwork layout Sonny Kay
9	Blend Mishkin & Roots Evolution	Survival of the Fittest	Cover design by Ben Menter. Logo Design by QBMix
10	Kate Boy	One Digital	3D Design by Lee Griggs

Some of the information in this table was obtained from the following referenced article:

== 2014 winners ==
Rank	Musical artist	Name	Cover artist
1	Royal Blood	Royal Blood	Dan Hillier and Richard Welland
2	FKA twigs	LP1	Jesse Kanda
3	Future Islands	Singles	Beth Hoeckel and Matt de Jong
4	Foo Fighters	Sonic Highways	Stephan Martinière
5	Röyksopp & Robyn	Do It Again (EP)	Kacper Kasprzyk, Sandberg and Timonen
6	Caribou	Our Love	Matthew Cooper and Jason Evans
7	La Roux	Trouble in Paradise	Alexander Brown, Elly Jackson, Louie Banks and Roger Deckker
8	SBTRKT	Wonder Where We Land	SBTRKT & A Hidden Place
9	Bombay Bicycle Club	So Long, See You Tomorrow	La Boca
10	Sohn	Tremors	Allison Fielding and Sohn

== 2013 winners ==
Rank	Musical artist	Name	Cover artist
1	White Lies	Big TV	Michael Kagan, Gerard Saint and Markus Karlsson
2	dan le sac Vs Scroobius Pip	Repent Replenish Repeat	Paul Jackson
3	Bonobo	The North Borders	Leif Podhajsky
4	Washed Out	Paracosm	Sara Cwynar
5	Braids	Flourish // Perish	Marc Rimmer
6	Atoms For Peace	Judge, Jury and Executioner	Stanley Donwood
7	!!!	Thr!!!er	Chase Jarvis, !!! and James Burton
8	Daft Punk	Get Lucky	Thomas Bangalter, Guy-Manuel de Homem-Christo, Cédric Hervet, Paul Hahn, and Warren Fu
9	Boards of Canada	Tomorrow's Harvest	Boards of Canada
10	Paul McCartney	New	Rebecca and Mike, YES, Ben Ib.

== 2012 winners ==
Rank	Musical artist	Name	Cover artist
1	The Temper Trap	The Temper Trap	Alberto Seveso and Boat Studios
2	Keane	Strangeland	Alex Lake and Tourist
3	Muse	The 2nd Law	Laboratory of Neuro Imaging, UCLA and Travis Shinn
4	Mark Lanegan Band	Blues Funeral	Alison Fielding
5	White Lung	Sorry	Justin Gradin
6	Enter Shikari	A Flash Flood of Colour	Ian Johnsen, Paul Blundell and Dave Thomas
7	Saint Etienne	Words and Music	Dorothy
8	Richard Hawley	Standing at the Sky's Edge	Nick Phillips and Richard Tailby
9	Jack White	Blunderbuss	Animal Rummy and Jo McCaughey
10	The Hives	Lex Hives	Henrik Walse

== 2011 winners ==
Rank	Musical artist	Name	Cover artist
1	Bright Eyes	The People's Key	Zack Nipper
2	Cults	Cults	Dave Bett and Jeannette Kaczorowski
3	Bon Iver	Bon Iver	Gregory Euclide
4	Washed Out	Within and Without	Ernest Greene, Jeff Kleinsmith and Martien Mulder
5	Kasabian	Velociraptor!	Aitor Throup at A.T. Studio
6	The Strokes	Angles	Guy Pouppez
7	Fleet Foxes	Helplessness Blues	Toby Liebowitz, Sean Pecknold and Dusty Summers
8	Cut Copy	Zonoscope	ALTER
9	Coldplay	Mylo Xyloto	Tappin Gofton
10	The Pains of Being Pure at Heart	Belong	Winston Chmielinski

== 2010 winners ==
Rank	Musical artist	Name	Cover artist
1	Klaxons	Surfing the Void	Richard Robinson and Gareth Pritchard
2	Caribou	Swim	Mathew Cooper and Jason Evans
3	Pablo Cahn and Cesar Merveille	Split EP	Amelie Nicolet
4	Junip	Fields	Fredrik Söderberg and Robert Samsonowitz
5	Arcade Fire	The Suburbs	Caroline Robert, Vincent Morriset and Gabriel Jones
6	Goldfrapp	Head First	Alison Goldfrapp, Mat Maitland and Serge Leblon
7	MGMT	Congratulations	Anthony Ausgang
8	Edwyn Collins	Losing Sleep	Edwyn Collins
9	Scissor Sisters	Night Work	Robert Mapplethorpe
10	Flying Lotus	Pattern+Grid World	Theo Ellsworth

== 2009 winners ==
Rank	Musical artist	Name	Cover artist
1	Muse	The Resistance	La Boca
2	Manic Street Preachers	Journal for Plague Lovers	Jenny Saville
3	Fever Ray	Fever Ray	Martin Ander
4	Massive Attack	Splitting the Atom	Tom Hingston and Robert del Naja
5	Green Day	21st Century Breakdown	Chris Bilheimer
6	Pet Shop Boys	Yes	Farrow Design
7	White Lies	To Lose My Life...	Mat Maitland and Gerard Saint
8	Editors	In this Light and on this Evening	Liliane Lijn and Tom Simon Mills
9	La Roux	La Roux	Alexander Brown and Traffic
10	Depeche Mode	Sounds of the Universe	Anton Corbijn

== 2008 winners ==
Rank	Musical artist	Name	Cover artist
1	Fleet Foxes	Fleet Foxes	Pieter Brueghel the Elder
2	Roots Manuva	Slime & Reason	Oscar Bauer & Ewan Robertson
3	Coldplay	Viva la Vida	Eugène Delacroix
4	Goldfrapp	Seventh Tree	Alison Goldfrapp, Mat Maitland and Serge Leblon
5	Elbow	The Seldom Seen Kid	Oliver East
6	Metallica	Death Magnetic	Turner Duckworth
7	Bloc Party	Intimacy	Rob Crane and Perry Curtis
8	Low Motion	Keep It Slow	Chris Bolton, Pascal Mira Tschäni and Michael Husmann Tschäni
9	Santogold	Santogold	Isabelle Lumpkin
10	Zombie Zombie	Dog Walker	Sylvestre Hovart

== 2007 winners ==
Rank	Musical artist	Name	Cover artist
1	The Cribs	Men's Needs, Women's Needs, Whatever	Rob Crane
2	Editors	An End Has a Start	Idris Khan at Tom Hingston Studio
3	The Nextmen	Let it Roll 12" Single	Joe Pilbeam
4	Eva Be	No Memory of Time	Kathrin Jackmann, Boris Meinhold
5	Thurston Revival	Somewhere There's an Angel 12" Single	Julie Bennett
6	Various Artists	We Are Silver EP	John Gilsenan at iwant
7	Unkle	Burn My Shadow 12"	Robert Del Naja
8	The Rakes	Ten New Messages	Rob Crane
9	Interpol	Our Love to Admire	Seth Smoot
10	Husky Rescue	Caravan 12"	Kustaa Saksi

== 2006 winners ==
Rank	Musical artist	Name	Cover artist
1	Thom Yorke	The Eraser	Stanley Donwood
2	The Pipettes	We Are The Pipettes	Pete Hellicar
3	Hot Chip	Over and Over	Darren Wall (Wallzo)
4	Keane	Under the Iron Sea	Sanna Annukka
5	Franz Ferdinand	The Fallen 12" single	Franz Ferdinand and Mathew Cooper
6	The Fratellis	Costello Music	Sam Hadley and Mark James
7	Morrissey	Ringleader of the Tormentors	Morrissey, Antony Lui and Fabio Lavino
8	Isolée	The Western Edits Pt. 2	Stefan Marx
9	DJ Shadow	The Outsider	Paul Insect
10	Oasis	Stop the Clocks	Peter Blake

== 2005 winners ==
Rank	Musical artist	Name	Cover artist
1	Hard-Fi	Stars of CCTV	Albion
2	Franz Ferdinand	You Could Have It So Much Better	Mathew Cooper
3	Gorillaz	Demon Days	Jamie Hewlett
4	Robbie Williams	Intensive Care	Grant Morrison, Frank Quitely and Hamish Brown
5	Madonna	Confessions on a Dancefloor	Steven Klein and Giovanni Bianco
6	Coldplay	X&Y	Tappin Gofton
7	Mylo	Destroy Rock & Roll	Phantom
8	Goldfrapp	Supernature	Mat Maitland and Gerard Saint
9	Kaiser Chiefs	Employment	Cally
10	Kanye West	Late Registration	Morning Breath, Inc.
