= Blanck Mass (album) =

Studio album by Blanck Mass
- Released: 21 June 2011
- Recorded: 2010
- Genre: Ambient; electronic
- Length: 62:23
- Label: Rock Action
- Producer: Blanck Mas

Blanck Mass chronology
Blanck Mass (2011)	Dumb Flesh (2015)

Professional ratings
Aggregate scores
Source	Rating
AnyDecentMusic?	6.8/10
Metacritic	71/100
Review scores
Source	Rating
Beats Per Minute	66%
Consequence of Sound	B
Drowned in Sound	8/10
MusicOMH	3/5 stars
NME	2/5 stars
No Ripcord	4/10
Pitchfork	7.7/10
Prefix	7/10
Tiny Mix Tapes	3.5/5 stars
XLR8R	7.5/10

Blanck Mass is the debut studio album by British musician Benjamin John Power, under his musical project Blanck Mass. It was released on 21 June 2011 by Rock Action Records. The album was re-issued as a deluxe version through Sacred Bones Records in 2020.

== Background ==
Blanck Mass was written, recorded and produced in Power's apartment in London over the course of 2010.

== Release ==
On 28 April 2011, Power announced he was releasing his debut eponymous album through Mogwai's Rock Action Records.

=== Singles ===
The first single "Land Disasters" was released on April 28, 2011.

=== Music videos ===
On 16 June 2011, the music video for "Icke's Struggle" was released.

== Reissue ==
On 7 March 2020, it was announced at a Record Store Day event that Blanck Mass was re-issuing Blanck Mass as a double deluxe-LP by Sacred Bones Records on 18 April 2020 in the UK, and 24 April 2020 worldwide.

== Critical reception ==
Blanck Mass was met with "generally favorable" reviews from critics. At Metacritic, which assigns a weighted average rating out of 100 to reviews from mainstream publications, this release received an average score of 71 based on 14 reviews. Aggregate website AnyDecentMusic? gave the release a 6.8 out of 10 based on a critical consensus of 19 reviews.

In a review for Consequence of Sound, critic reviewer Adam Kivel wrote: "While it may not be as primal as Street Horrrsing, or as concise as Tarot Sport, Blanck Mass’s self-titled debut packs the same sort of punch, and that punch is one that goes directly to the gut." At Beats Per Minute, the album was described as "an exhibition of some of the best sonic control and sound shaping around." Chris White of MusicOMH explained: "Blanck Mass sees Power going it alone for the first time and the end result is a self-titled debut album that’s both similar and different to Tarot Sport. The cinematic, epic scale and effective use of sound manipulations such as echo and distortion that made such an important contribution to the latter record are still very much in place on Blanck Mass. Laura Snapes of NME gave Blanck Mass two stars out of five.

=== Accolades ===
Publications' year-end list appearances for Blanck Mass
Critic/Publication	List	Rank	Ref
Fact	Fact's Top 50 Albums of 2011	45	

== Track listing ==
All tracks are written by Blanck Mass.

Blanck Mass track listing
No.	Title	Length
1.	"Sifted Gold"	3:39
2.	"Sundowner"	7:59
3.	"Chernobyl"	4:24
4.	"Raw Deal"	9:54
5.	"Sub Serious"	6:47
6.	"Land Disasters"	7:16
7.	"Icke's Struggle"	3:11
8.	"Fuckers"	2:16
9.	"What You Know"	13:35
10.	"Weakling Flier"	3:22
