= Magazine (song) =

Single by Editors

from the album Violence
- Released: 16 January 2018
- Recorded: 2016–2017
- Studio: Glasshouse, Oxford; Livingston Studios, London; Lynchmob Studios, London; Monnow Valley Studios, Rockfield, Monmouthshire
- Genre: Electroclash; art pop; darkwave; alternative dance
- Length: 4:54
- Label: PIAS Records
- Songwriter(s): Tom Smith; Russell Leetch; Edward Lay; Justin Lockey; Elliott Williams
- Producer(s): Leo Abrahams

Editors singles chronology
"All the Kings" (2016)	"Magazine" (2018)	"Hallelujah (So Low)" (2018)

Music video
- "Magazine" on YouTube

"Magazine" is a single by British indie rock band, Editors. The song is the lead single off of their sixth studio album, Violence. The single was released on 16 January 2018 through PIAS Recordings.

== Background ==
The band revealed that the song was originally written around 2010 and 2011 in between the In This Light and on This Evening and The Weight of Your Love sessions.

== Style ==
Ben Kaye, writing for Consequence of Sound described the album as a clash between electronic dance music, dark wave and rock, calling it a more upbeat track on the album.

The song has been described by the band as "a pointed finger aimed at those in power… some corrupt politician or businessman… a character, and a tongue in cheek poke at the empty posturing and playing to the masses of the power hungry."

== Music video ==
The music video was directed by Rahi Rezvani, who also directed the band's music videos from the previous album, In Dream.

== Charts ==
Chart performance for "Magazine"
Chart (2018)	Peak position
Belgium (Ultratip Bubbling Under Flanders)	1
Belgium (Ultratip Bubbling Under Wallonia)	30
Poland (ZPAV)	50
