= Hallelujah (So Low) =

Single by Editors

from the album Violence
- Released: 21 February 2018
- Recorded: 2016–2017
- Studio: Glasshouse, Oxford; Livingston Studios, London; Lynchmob Studios, London; Monnow Valley Studios, Rockfield, Monmouthshire
- Genre: Electronic rock
- Length: 3:56
- Label: PIAS Records
- Songwriter(s): Tom Smith; Russell Leetch; Edward Lay; Justin Lockey; Elliott Williams
- Producer(s): Leo Abrahams

Editors singles chronology
"Magazine" (2018)	"Hallelujah (So Low)" (2018)	"Darkness at the Door" (2018)

Music video
- "Hallelujah (So Low)" on YouTube

"Hallelujah (So Low)" is a single by British indie rock band, Editors. The song is the second single off of their sixth studio album, Violence. The single was released on 21 February 2018 through PIAS Recordings.

== Background and composition ==
The song was written by Tom Smith when he was traveling through Oxfam and visited refugee camps in Northern Greece. Smith said that experiencing these camps was "obviously an incredibly moving trip, seeing people living in dust, surviving only on the help of others was very moving". Tom Smith of Editors said that he felt the song was the most "rock-oriented" song they have composed in their career.

== Music video ==
The music video was directed by Rahi Rezvani, who also directed the band's music videos from the previous album, In Dream. The music video features the band playing in a monochrome world with rain falling.

== Reception ==
Andrew Trendell of New Musical Express compared "Hallelujah (So Low)" to Depeche Mode calling it a blistering electronic rock song. Robin Murray of Clash called the track a "raw and brusied" digital production.

== Charts ==
Chart performance for "Hallelujah (So Low)"
Chart (2018)	Peak position
Mexico (Billboard Mexico Ingles Airplay)	30
