= Life Is a Fear =

Single by Editors

from the album In Dream
- Released: 12 August 2015
- Recorded: 2014
- Studio: Crear Studio, Scotland
- Genre: Post-punk
- Length: 5:05
- Label: PIAS Records
- Songwriter(s): Tom Smith, Russell Leetch, Edward Lay, Justin Lockey and Elliott Williams

Editors singles chronology
"No Harm" (2015)	"Life Is a Fear" (2015)	"Ocean of Night" (2015)

Music video
- "Life Is A Fear" on YouTube

"Life Is a Fear" is a single by British indie rock band, Editors. The song is the fifth track and the third single off of their fifth studio album, In Dream, and was released through PIAS Recordings on 12 August 2015.

== Music video ==
Rahi Rezvani, who also directed the band's singles, "No Harm" and "Ocean of Night" also directed the music video for "Life Is a Fear". The music video features the band in a monochrome room with lasers shining on them driving a car. The music video was released one day prior to the official single release, on 11 August 2015. In describing the music video, Rezvani explained that "I am a black and white person, un-scared of dividing the world in good and bad. When you have a past like mine, you don't have time to think in shades of gray."

== Charts ==
Chart performance for "Life Is a Fear"
Chart (2015)	Peak position
Belgium (Ultratop 50 Flanders)	40
Belgium (Ultratip Bubbling Under Wallonia)	35
Mexico (Billboard Mexico Ingles Airplay)	50
Netherlands (Single Tip)	28
