= The Blanck Mass Sessions =

EP by Editors and Blanck Mass
- Released: 3 April 2019
- Studio: Glasshouse Oxford, Oxford, England, UK
- Length: 36:32
- Language: English
- Label: PIAS Recordings
- Producer: Blanck Mass

Editors chronology
Violence (2018)	The Blanck Mass Sessions (2019)	Black Gold: Best of Editors (2020)

Blanck Mass chronology
World Eater (2017)	Animated Violence Mild (2019)

The Blanck Mass Sessions is a 2019 EP from British indie rock band Editors in collaboration with electronic musician Blanck Mass. Released as a Record Store Day promotion, it has received mixed reviews from critics.

== Reception ==
Editors at AllMusic rated this album 3 out of 5 stars, with critic Neil Z. Yeung writing that "these synth-based doppelgangers amplify the digital dread and anxiety, paring away much of the guitar groove and live drumming from the originals while slathering atmospheric layers over it all" and that compared to the versions of these songs on 2017's Violence, this release "offers a fresh perspective on one of Editors' finest albums to date". Barney Harsent of The Arts Desk gave this release 2 out of 5 stars, calling the decision to allow Blanck Mass to remix the music a "fairly ballsy move by the band" and continued that while "there is some grade A production technique on display here... it’s at the expense of any downtime", resulting in "exhausting listening" with "the worst excesses of EDM". At PopMatters, Richard Driver scored The Blanck Mass Sessions an 8 out of 10, calling "this new set of tracks more engaging and tangible" than Violence that "ultimately deserve an equal footing to any album... released by Editors and further my own previous review of a vivid and articulate presentation of isolation, collaboration, and regeneration, set of tracks and thematic elements on an album". Under the Radar's Matt the Raven rated this work 3.5 out of 10 stars, stating that "why re-work of something that is already as unique and alluring as Editors’ cinematic indie rock is somewhat of a mystery to begin with, and after listening to The Blanck Mass Sessions it proves to be a totally unnecessary exercise" and summing up that listeners should stick to Violence, as the "scruffy and electronically enhanced re-works heard on The Blanck Mass Sessions play like a one-off adventure and are a risk-taking excursion that challenge the ears too much to make revisiting them worthwhile".

== Track listing ==
All songs written by Ed Lay, Russell Leetch, Justin Lockey, Benjamin John Power, Tom Smith, and Elliott Williams

1. "Barricades" (The Blanck Mass recording) – 4:11
2. "Cold" (The Blanck Mass recording) – 4:05
3. "Hallelujah (So Low)" (The Blanck Mass recording) – 3:41
4. "Violence" (The Blanck Mass recording) – 6:08
5. "Darkness at the Door" (The Blanck Mass recording) – 3:29
6. "Nothingness" (The Blanck Mass recording) – 5:04
7. "Magazine" (The Blanck Mass recording) – 4:04
8. "Counting Spooks" (The Blanck Mass recording) – 5:50

== Personnel ==
Editors and Blanck Mass

- Blanck Mass – keyboards, synthesizers, electronics, production
- Ed Lay – drums, percussion, backing vocals
- Russell Leetch – bass guitar, synthesizer, backing vocals
- Justin Lockey – lead guitar, engineering
- Tom Smith – lead vocals, rhythm guitar, piano
- Elliott Williams – keyboards, synthesizers, additional guitars, backing vocals

Additional personnel

- Matt Colton – audio mastering at Alchemy Mastering, London, England, United Kingdom
- Caesar Edmunds – mixing assistance on "Barricades" at Dead Door Studios
- Steven A. Griffiths – mixing on all tracks except "Barricades" at Assault and Battery Studios, London, England, United Kingdom
- Alan Moulder – mixing on "Barricades" at Dead Door Studios
- Rahi Rezvani – design, artwork

== See also ==
- 2019 in British music
- 2019 in rock music
- List of 2019 albums
