= Dilate (Vessels album) =

Studio album by Vessels
- Released: 3 March 2015
- Genre: Ambient, post-rock
- Length: 49:22
- Label: Bias

Vessels chronology
Helioscope (2011)	Dilate (2015)	The Great Distraction (2017)

Professional ratings
Aggregate scores
Source	Rating
Album of the Year	78/100
AnyDecentMusic?	7.4/10
Metacritic	75/100
Review scores
Source	Rating
AllMusic	4/5 stars
DIY	4/5 stars
Drowned in Sound	6/10
God is in the TV	8/10
The Line of Best Fit	8/10
Loud and Quiet	8/10
Mojo	4/5 stars
The Music	3.5/5 stars
Q	3/5 stars
The Skinny	4/5 stars

Dilate is the third studio album by English electronic band Vessels. It was released in March 2015 under Bias Records.

== Track list ==
No.	Title	Length
1.	"Vertical"	5:54
2.	"Elliptic"	8:48
3.	"Echo In"	3:21
4.	"As You Are"	4:12
5.	"Attica"	6:40
6.	"On Monos"	6:45
7.	"Glass Lake"	6:21
8.	"On Your Own Ten Toes"	7:21
