= All the Kings =

Single by Editors

from the album In Dream
- Released: 16 June 2016
- Recorded: 2014–2015
- Studio: Crear Studio, Scotland
- Genre: Post-punk
- Length: 4:54
- Label: PIAS Records
- Songwriter(s): Tom Smith, Russell Leetch, Edward Lay, Justin Lockey and Elliott Williams

Editors singles chronology
"Forgiveness" (2016)	"All the Kings" (2016)	"Magazine" (2018)

Music video
- "All the Kings" on YouTube

"All the Kings" is a single by British indie rock band, Editors. The song is the sixth and final single from the band's fifth studio album, In Dream. It is also the eighth track on the album. The single was released on 16 June 2016 through PIAS Recordings.

== Music video ==
Rahi Rezvani, who directed the previous singles on In Dream also directed the music video for "All the Kings". The music video was recorded in the Dutch Spaarnwoude Park between Amsterdam and IJmuiden (at climbing wall / landArt) and released on 16 June 2016. Leo Sigh described the song as "powerful, heart-grabbing Editors track that comes with a gorgeous video".

== Charts ==
Chart performance for "All the Kings"
Chart (2016)	Peak position
Belgium (Ultratop 50 Flanders)	47
