= Fuck Buttons =

British electronic music duo formed in 2004

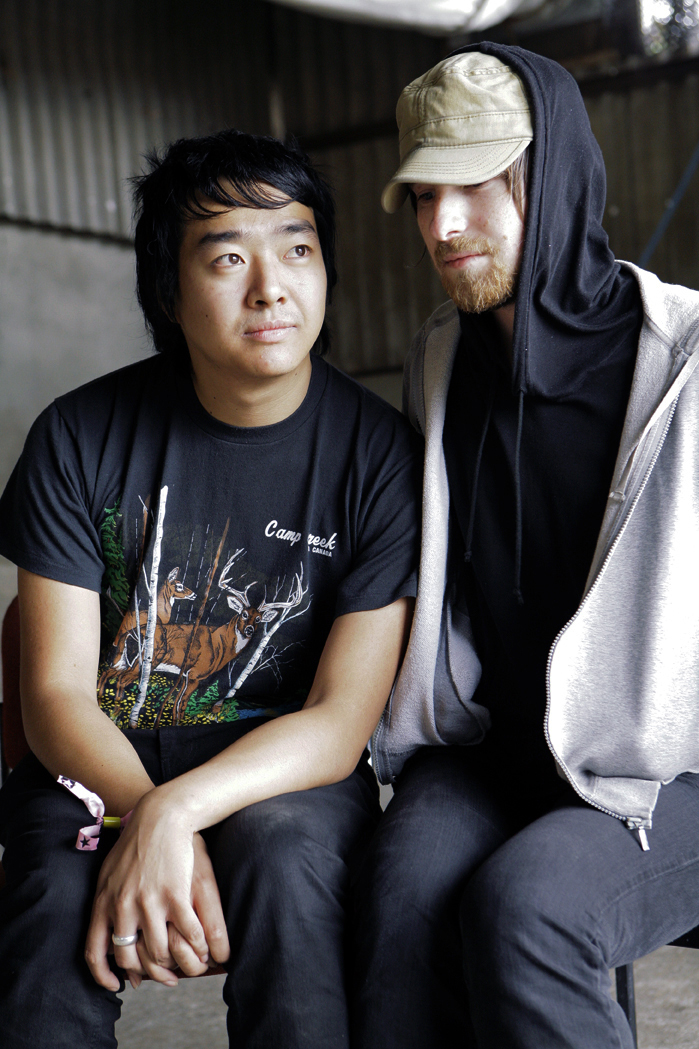
- Fuck Buttons members Andrew Hung (left) and Benjamin John Power (right) in 2007

Background information
- Origin: Bristol, England, United Kingdom
- Genres: Electronica; experimental; psychedelic; post-rock
- Years active: 2004–2015
- Label: ATP Recordings
- Members: Andrew Hung; Benjamin John Power
- Website: fckbttns.tumblr.com

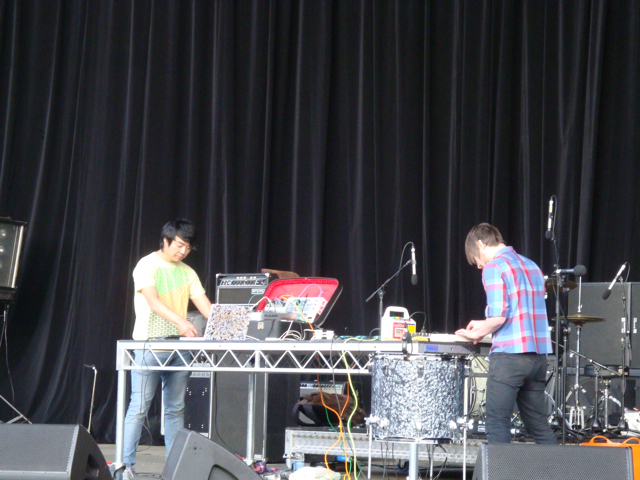
Fuck Buttons performing at All Tomorrow's Parties, Mt Buller, Australia in 2009

Fuck Buttons were a British electronic music duo formed in 2004 in Bristol by Andrew Hung and Benjamin John Power. Their noise-influenced work received wide critical acclaim in the late 2000s and early 2010s.

== Biography ==
=== Origins (2004–2008) ===
Hung and Power grew up in Worcester. Hung was influenced by Aphex Twin, while Power was a fan of Mogwai. They developed a friendship in 2004 while attending art school in Bristol, and began working together, initially to create the soundtrack to a film made by Hung. Immediately after forming, they played live whenever possible, and soon gathered a cult following. The duo use a variety of instruments including Casiotone keyboards and children's toys such as a Fisher-Price karaoke machine. Their name was chosen to sound "playful and abrasive".

Time Out magazine described the band's live sound as an "adrenaline pumping, ear purging slab of towering, pristine noise". The duo signed to All Tomorrow's Parties-affiliated ATP Recordings in 2007, and released a limited-edition 7" single named "Bright Tomorrow", which received complimentary reviews from such sources as Drowned in Sound, Pitchfork (who described it as "something like the sun rising over the ocean... then going supernova"), Mojo (it became their No. 1 Mojo Playlist Single for that month) and Stereogum.

Combined with an upsurge in reviews of their live performances at the Supersonic, Truck and Portishead-curated ATP festivals in the second half of 2007, this attention resulted in Fuck Buttons being included in many end of year newspaper, magazine and online articles predicting them as a 'Hot Tip' for 2008. These included New-Noise, who said that "rarely have two men sounded so much like the end of the world" and British newspaper The Observer, which called their sound "a joyous racket of swirling atmospherics and percussive gunfire" in an article highlighting them in a new wave of intelligent, literate British pop music.

=== Street Horrrsing (2008–2009) ===
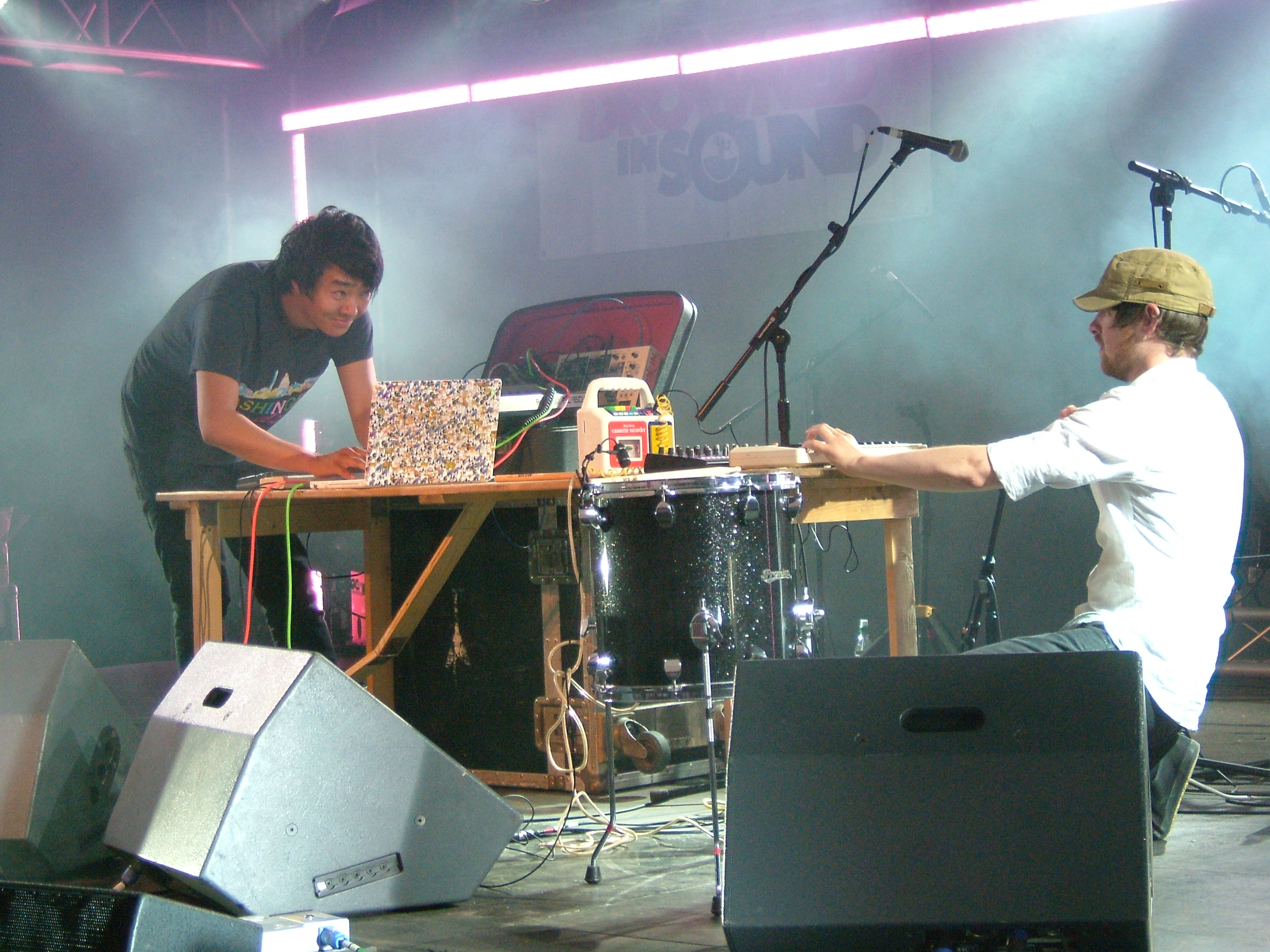
Performing at Summer Sundae 2008

They started the year with a tour of slightly larger UK venues, supported by label-mate Alexander Tucker. This was done to build anticipation for their debut album, Street Horrrsing, which was released on 17 March. Produced by John Cummings of Mogwai and mastered by Bob Weston of Shellac, it was promoted through festival appearances (including a slot at the ATP vs Pitchfork festival) and a North American tour with Caribou.

Early reviews of Street Horrrsing were very positive; it was named Underground Album of the Month by Mojo Magazine, who called it "a 50-minute melange of iridescent synths, psychedelic drone, distorted vocals and tribal rhythm". Pitchfork awarded it with an 8.6 out of 10 rating which placed it in their "best new music" section. Positive reviews also featured in The Times, The Observer, The Wire, NME, Rock Sound, Kerrang!, Uncut, Sydney Morning Herald, and many other music publications and websites. It was also chosen for the shortlist of The Guardian's First Album awards.

=== Tarot Sport (2009–2013) ===
In 2009, the band appeared at the Australian All Tomorrow's Parties event. They released their second album, Tarot Sport in October 2009. It has been well received, with Rock Sound giving it an 8 out of 10 rating and hailing its consistency ("the continuity gluing them together confirms a genuine full-length article to brandish at all those gun-jumping 'The album is dead' doomsayers"), while AllMusic gave it a 4-star rating, describing it as "an impressive step forward for Fuck Buttons". Discussing it with Exclaim! magazine, the band admitted that "direction is not something we are conscious about because it doesn't fit into our creative process. We just want to keep being content and surprising ourselves".

"Surf Solar" and "Olympians" featured separately during the 2012 Summer Olympics opening ceremony on 27 July 2012. "Sundowner" from Power's solo venture Blanck Mass was covered by the London Symphony Orchestra during the raising of the Union Jack.

For the Guardian, Louis Pattison described Fuck Buttons' style prior to the release of Slow Focus as being inspired by My Bloody Valentine, Spacemen 3 and Mogwai, noting, however, that what distinguished them from their influences was the lack of prominent or traditional use of guitars; Pattison described this as "a sustained battery of fuzzed-out drones, crashing drums, and a cacophony of shrieks and cries".

=== Slow Focus (2013–2015) ===
Fuck Buttons released their third album Slow Focus on 22 July 2013.

A new track recorded with electronic musician Jean Michel Jarre entitled "Immortals" was released on the Jarre album Electronica 1: The Time Machine on 16 October 2015.

After an extensive world tour in support of Slow Focus, the band went on hiatus while Power and Hung pursued solo projects. Following years of silence regarding new music, Hung made the confirmation on his Twitter account in 2022 that the duo had officially broken up.

== Solo activities and side projects ==
=== Andrew Hung ===
In 2012, Andrew Hung founded a new project called Dawn Hunger with vocalist Claire Inglis and musician Matthew de Pulford. He also released his solo debut EP called Rave Cave in 2015. Hung released his first solo debut LP Realisationship (Lex Records) on 6 October 2017.

Hung also works as a producer. In 2016 he co-wrote & co-produced Beth Orton's new album Kidsticks. 2020 saw the release of the debut album by Aimee Osbourne under the name ARO, Hung co-wrote and produced three of the tracks on the album.

Hung has also worked on scoring music for television and films, working with Director Jim Hosking on cult film The Greasy Strangler, An Evening With Beverly Luff Linn and the series Tropical Cop Tales for Adult Swim.

=== Benjamin John Power ===
Power founded his solo project Blanck Mass in 2011. He has been on tour with Sigur Rós and the track "Sundowner" was used at key points during the Opening Ceremony of the 2012 Olympic games. It was first heard as the Union Flag was brought into the stadium by members of the Armed Forces.

Power has released five albums to date as Blanck Mass: Blanck Mass (Rock Action Records, 2011), Dumb Flesh (Sacred Bones Records, 2015), World Eater (Sacred Bones Records, 2017), Animated Violence Mild (Sacred Bones Records, 2019) and In Ferneaux (Sacred Bones Records, 2021).

== Discography ==
=== Studio albums ===
- Street Horrrsing (CD / 2×LP, ATPR, 2008)
- Tarot Sport (CD / 2×LP, ATPR, 2009) UK No. 79, U.S. Dance No. 9, U.S. Heatseekers No. 18
- Slow Focus (CD / 2xLP, ATPR, 2013) UK No. 36

=== Singles ===
- "Let's See If There Are Any Ghosts in Here, Yeah?" (CD-R single, 2006)
- "Bright Tomorrow" (limited picture disc 7″ single, ATPR, 2007)
- "Colours Move" (12″/download single, ATPR, 2008)
- Mogwai/Fuck Buttons tour single (10", Rock Action Records, 2008). Includes a Fuck Buttons cover of "Mogwai Fear Satan"
- "Surf Solar" (7″/download single, ATPR, 2009)
- "Olympians" (12"/download single, ATPR, 2010)
- "Brainfreeze" (12"/download single, ATPR, 2013)
- "The Red Wing" (12"/download single, ATPR, 2013)

=== Remixes ===
- "If I Had a Heart" – Fever Ray (2009)
- "Virginia State Epileptic Colony" – Manic Street Preachers (2009)
- "Kaili" – Caribou (2010)
- "Tornado" – Jónsi (2011)
- "The Perfect Life" – Moby (2013)
- "All Torque" – Hybrid (2014)
- "Modern Liars" – Atari Teenage Riot (2014)
