= Martin Ander =

Swedish graphic designer, illustrator, and artist

- Born: 1976 (age 49–50)
- Other names: Mander
- Known for: graphic design and illustration
- Notable work: "Ouff! Mander selected works"
- Movement: Skateboarding and graffiti
- Website: mander.nu

Martin "Mander" Ander (born 6 April 1976) is a Swedish graphic designer, illustrator and artist known for his work in the skateboard and music industry.

== Life and career ==
Martin Ander grew up in the 1970s and 80s in a suburb of Stockholm. His mother was a journalist, while his father was a graphic designer and art director at an advertising agency.

It was in the Swedish capital that he started to get involved with the skateboarding scene and culture in the mid-1980s. That was when skateboarding became an influential trend in Northern Europe. As a teenager, he also experimented with graffiti and his later works draw significant inspiration from this scene. For a period from 1991 on, he participated actively in the Stockholm graffiti scene, but realized soon after that "[he] was never going to be a hard core train writer or bomber, so [he] stuck to just being in the culture, sketching, painting walls, partying, and hanging out with other writers".

Drawing has always been a part of his life. As a teenager he started to combine his creative work with his involvement in the skateboarding community, for example by drawing for the local skateboard shop. Together with a friend, he also started a skateboarding fanzine and did all the illustrations.

The Stockholm-based community around skateboarding, music, and graffiti influenced his work and became the basis for his later success. He became involved with the Swedish graffiti magazine Underground Productions that was an active contributor to the debate around the Swedish capital's Zero Tolerance Policy against graffiti in the public space. He later became the art director of the magazine.

"(...) I never really had any interests or a plan on what to do but I always liked drawing so I just kept on drawing. When I got a little bit older, people started asking me if I could draw something and it’s just continued from that. I don’t have any education or anything like that."

When Martin Ander came back to Stockholm in the late 1990s after a period of moving between different cities he started to professionalize his graphic design work. As a designer of skateboard graphics, he has received major attention in the international skateboarding community when starting to design skateboard decks for the US-American company Flip Skateboards in 2012. During a period of four to five years, he designed about 150 graphics for them. He has also worked with European brands like Bellows Skateboards, Sweet Skateboards, and Sour skateboards.

When interviewed about the creative messages of his designs, he said:

"I guess subconsciously, there’s always a message whatever you draw. I try to make some kind of joke, some kind of meaning to it, I want to have lots of things happening. When I was a kid and went into the skateshop, I looked at everything and it looked so cool and I was like, “Oh this is so cool, I don’t really understand what it is but it’s gotta mean something really cool”. You made up your own story about what it’s about. I really like making people building their own stories around an image (...)."

Apart from designing skateboard graphics, Martin Ander got involved with other industries interested in his art and design in the 2000s. Since then, he has designed album covers (among others for Fever Ray which made the third place in the Best Art Vinyl award competition 2008), album art (for rapper KRS-ONE), posters (for example for Håkan Hellström and the Netflix series Stranger Things) as well as worked on different product designs, advertising campaigns and signature collaborations with, among others, clothing brand RVCA, watch brand CHPO, and Pabst Blue Ribbon. Furthermore, he has edited books such as children books about hip hop and sketch books, but also co-edited Sheraton Years – Stockholm Skateboarding 1991–1999 and a review of his own works, Ouff! Mander Selected Works.

As major sources of inspiration and artistic influences, he cites the global skateboarding community, artists Rick Griffin and Hans Arnold as well as the MAD magazine.

Nowadays, Martin Ander is based in Gnesta.

== Publications ==
- Ouff! Mander Selected Works (2018)
- Stockholm Coloring Book (2016)
- Slajs – En rappa-med-bok om Pizza (2014)
- Cut and Fold Subway Sketch Book (2013)
- The Hip Hop Board Book (2012)
- Subway Sketchbook (2010)
- Sheraton Years – Stockholm Skateboarding 1991–1999 (2008, together with Martin Karlsson and Jens Andersson)

== Exhibitions ==
- Mander. Teckning, posters och grafik, exhibition at Sörmlands museum (2021-2022)
- Mander 2020, solo show at Brillo, Stockholm, Sweden (2020)
- Bagage, solo retrospect exhibition, Trelleborgs Museum, Sweden (2019–2020)
- Mander at Teckningsmuseet, solo retrospect exhibition. The Museum of Drawings, Laholm, Sweden (2019)
- Svensk Konst Nu (Swedish Art Now), group show. Nora Art/Bryggeriet Nora, Sweden (2018)
- Violent By Design, Second Installment, group show. Exhibit A Gallery, Los Angeles, USA (2017)
