= Ocean of Night =

Single by Editors

from the album In Dream
- Released: 24 November 2015
- Recorded: 2014
- Studio: Crear Studio, Scotland
- Genre: Post-punk
- Length: 5:05
- Label: PIAS Records
- Songwriter(s): Tom Smith, Russell Leetch, Edward Lay, Justin Lockey and Elliott Williams

Editors singles chronology
"Life Is a Fear" (2015)	"Ocean of Night" (2015)	"Forgiveness" (2016)

"Ocean of Night" is a single by British indie rock band, Editors. The song is the second track and the fourth single off of their fifth studio album, In Dream, and was released through PIAS Recordings on 20 April 2015. As of 2019, it is the band's second most streamed single of Spotify, amounting nearly 18.5 million streams.

== Style ==
Chris Payne, writing for Billboard called the track a symbol of the band's "lofty aspirations". Payne said that "Tom Smith’s baritone has a sweeping grandiosity to it, and the band hasn’t been afraid to put it to task. They’ve gone from rock to electro and back, and on the latest offering from their fifth studio album In Dream, these brash aspirations are on full display."

== Music video ==
The music video for "Ocean of Night" was released on 23 November 2015 and premiered on Billboard magazine's website. The music video was directed by Rahi Rezvani and featured montages of the band performing the track in Dublin's Olympia Theatre on 10 October 2015. The video also features Rachel Goswell of Slowdive.

== Charts ==
Chart performance for "Ocean of Night"
Chart (2015)	Peak position
Belgium (Ultratip Bubbling Under Flanders)	1
