= Animated Violence Mild =

Studio album by Blanck Mass
- Released: 16 August 2019
- Length: 43:05
- Label: Sacred Bones

Blanck Mass chronology
The Blanck Mass Sessions (2019)	Animated Violence Mild (2019)	In Ferneaux (2021)

Singles from Animated Violence Mild
- 1. "Love Is a Parasite" Released: 31 July 2019

Animated Violence Mild is the fourth studio album by British electronic musician Blanck Mass. It was released on 16 August 2019 under Sacred Bones Records.

The album's title is likely a reference to a disclaimer sticker applied to certain arcade cabinets by the American Amusement Machine Association.

== Critical reception ==
Professional ratings
Aggregate scores
Source	Rating
AnyDecentMusic?	7.8/10
Metacritic	80/100
Review scores
Source	Rating
AllMusic	4/5 stars
Clash	8/10
Exclaim!	8/10
The Guardian	4/5 stars
The Line of Best Fit	9/10
MusicOMH	4.5/5 stars
NME	4/5 stars
Pitchfork	7.9/10
Resident Advisor	3/5 stars

Animated Violence Mild was met with generally favourable reviews from critics. At Metacritic, which assigns a weighted average rating out of 100 to reviews from mainstream publications, this release received an average score of 80, based on 20 reviews.

=== Accolades ===
Accolades for Animated Violence Mild
Publication	Accolade	Rank	Ref.
BrooklynVegan	Top 50 Albums of 2019	50	
DJ Mag	Top 50 Albums of 2019	48	
MusicOMH	Top 50 Albums of 2019	28	
No Ripcord	Top 50 Albums of 2019	22	
PopMatters	Top 70 Albums of 2019	53	
Treble	Top 50 Albums of 2019	49	
Under the Radar	Top 100 Albums of 2019	68	

== Track listing ==
All tracks are written by Blanck Mass, unless noted

Animated Violence Mild track listing
No.	Title	Length
1.	"Intro"	0:35
2.	"Death Drop"	7:18
3.	"House vs. House"	7:41
4.	"Hush Money"	5:32
5.	"Love Is a Parasite"	6:16
6.	"Creature/West Fuqua"	3:44
7.	"No Dice"	6:06
8.	"Wings of Hate"	5:53
Total length:		43:05

== Charts ==
Chart performance for Animated Violence Mild
Chart (2019)	Peak position
Scottish Albums (OCC)	31
UK Independent Albums (OCC)	6
