= Violence (Editors album) =

Studio album by Editors
- Released: 9 March 2018
- Recorded: 2016–2017
- Studios: Glasshouse, Oxford; Livingston Studios, London; Lynchmob Studios, London; Monnow Valley Studios, Rockfield, Monmouthshire
- Length: 43:17
- Label: PIAS
- Producers: Leo Abrahams; Editors

Editors chronology
In Dream (2015)	Violence (2018)	The Blanck Mass Sessions (2019)

Singles from Violence
- 1. "Magazine" Released: 16 January 2018; 2. "Hallelujah (So Low)" Released: 21 February 2018; 3. "Darkness at the Door" Released: 27 April 2018; 4. "Cold" Released: 16 October 2018

Violence is the sixth studio album from British band Editors. It was released on 9 March 2018 by PIAS Recordings. The album features a new studio recording of "No Sound but the Wind", a track previously released in a different version on the soundtrack to the film The Twilight Saga: New Moon in 2009 and as a subsequent live recording in 2010. The band produced the album themselves with Leo Abrahams, and were assisted musically by Benjamin John Power, also known as Blanck Mass, who is half of the drone music duo Fuck Buttons. The initial recording sessions with Power yielded the companion release The Blanck Mass Sessions, which features alternate recordings of songs from Violence, and was first released on 13 April 2019 for Record Store Day.

== Background ==
Over the course of late 2016 to late 2017 the band posted pictures of the recording process on Instagram with a concluding post, stating: "Album 6 ... done! #e6 #editors" on 26 October 2017.

In an interview with Jo Whiley prior to the first play of the single "Magazine", singer Tom Smith said: "We had a lot of help from a guy called Blanck Mass, who makes very brutal electronic music. So when it's electronic, it's very electronic. But then when it's guitar-y, it's very band driven. I think we've managed to find the balance of those two things better than we have done before. Over the years, we've gone from backwards between more band-orientated sounding records and more electronic records. I think there's a balance here between melody and brutality that I don't think we've managed to get before."

When asked about the content of the album Smith said: "There's a thread on a lot of these songs – the need for human connection or coming together as people; an intimacy, with a loved one or a friend, as an escape from the outside world."

== Critical reception ==
Professional ratings
Aggregate scores
Source	Rating
Metacritic	72/100
Review scores
Source	Rating
AllMusic	4/5 stars
Drowned in Sound	7/10
MusicOMH	7/10
NME	8/10
PopMatters	7/10
Q	8/10

Violence received positive reviews from music critics. The album has received a score of 72 on review aggregator website Metacritic, which indicates "generally favorable reviews", based on 13 reviews. Andrew Trendell of NME awarded the album with 4 out of 5 stars, using the track "No Sound but the Wind" as a symbol for the band's improvement over the last records with Violence: "It's an aching but hopeful lament to marching on against the odds. It seems only too fitting then that in this incarnation, it's part of the record that could well bring Editors back home."

Matt Collar, writing for AllMusic, gave the album 4 out of 5 stars: "With Violence, the Editors have crafted a big pop album on their own terms, rife with grand, operatic gestures and heat-seeking hooks that cut deep, just as they put salve on your wounds."

In a review for the album published in paper by Q, the album was awarded 4 out of 5 stars with the statement: "The results okays to their strengths. ... There's a lightness of touch here lost since An End Has a Start a decade ago."

Writing for Drowned in Sound, Cady Siregar gave the album a rating of 7 out of 10, the same score Violence's predecessor In Dream received. Overall praising the new direction of the album, the review reads: "It's clear with Violence that Editors are working to build upon their new sound instead of re-inventing and re-producing, and though their efforts of combining dark indie disco-pop with more morose lyrics and guitar undertones, it is a refreshing new direction."

Andy Baber of musicOMH, awarding the album with a 7 out of 10 rating, follows similar lines of thought, describing the album as both exertive yet ultimately worthwhile: "It may not be an easy listening experience at times, but Violence is ultimately an album that deserves your patience." Similarly, Richard Driver of PopMatters, while awarding the album with 7 out of 10 stars and drawing a positive conclusion, writes: "Violence sounds too much like Editors sought to remake themselves as part of a worthy collaboration with artist Blanck Mass under leadership by producer Leo Abrahams, with success intermittent and weak spots highlighted inadvertently. The album altogether is enjoyable but risks too much as a method of visualizing its distinction from the band's preceding albums."

== Promotion and release ==
Editors performed three album launch shows in the UK prior to the album's release, and the band toured the United States in May 2018, the United Kingdom and Ireland in October 2018, and Europe in November and December 2018. The album's first single, "Magazine", premiered on Jo Whiley’s BBC Radio 2 show on 15 January 2018. The second single, "Hallelujah (So Low)", was premiered on Annie Mac's BBC Radio 1 show on 21 February 2018.

== Track listing ==
Standard edition
No.	Title	Length
1.	"Cold"	3:38
2.	"Hallelujah (So Low)"	3:55
3.	"Violence"	6:06
4.	"Darkness at the Door"	4:26
5.	"Nothingness"	5:05
6.	"Magazine"	3:55
7.	"No Sound but the Wind"	4:27
8.	"Counting Spooks"	5:43
9.	"Belong"	6:02
Total length:		43:17

Deluxe edition bonus tracks
No.	Title	Length
10.	"The Pulse"	6:32
11.	"When We Were Angels"	5:18
Total length:		55:07

Japanese edition bonus track
No.	Title	Length
10.	"The Pulse" (Oxford)	5:59
Total length:		49:33

== Personnel ==
- Produced by Editors and Leo Abrahams
- Additional production by Benjamin John Power (tracks 1 to 6, 8)
- Additional synthesizers and programming by Leo Abrahams
- Additional keyboards on "Cold" by Edith Philips
- Violin on "Counting Spooks" by Emma Smith
- Justin Lockey – engineer (tracks 1 to 8)
- Max Heyes – engineer (tracks 1 to 8)
- Assistant engineers at Livingston Studios – Billy Halliday and Tom Archer
- Assistant engineers at Monnow Valley Studios – Edith Philips, Ewan Vickery, and Matt Glasbey
- Mixed by Cenzo Townshend (tracks 1, 3 to 9)
- "Hallelujah (So Low)" mixed by Alan Moulder, assisted by Caesar Edmunds
- Mastered by Matt Colton
- Concept photography, artwork and design by Rahi Rezvani

== Charts ==
=== Weekly charts ===
Chart (2018)	Peak position
Austrian Albums (Ö3 Austria)	6
Belgian Albums (Ultratop Flanders)	1
Belgian Albums (Ultratop Wallonia)	3
Croatian International Albums (HDU)	3
Dutch Albums (Album Top 100)	2
French Albums (SNEP)	49
German Albums (Offizielle Top 100)	6
Irish Albums (IRMA)	20
Italian Albums (FIMI)	24
Polish Albums (ZPAV)	10
Portuguese Albums (AFP)	25
Scottish Albums (Official Charts)	5
Spanish Albums (Promusicae)	29
Swiss Albums (Schweizer Hitparade)	10
UK Albums (Official Charts)	6

=== Year-end charts ===
Chart (2018)	Position
Belgian Albums (Ultratop Flanders)	16
Belgian Albums (Ultratop Wallonia)	136
