= Slow Focus =

Studio album by Fuck Buttons
- Released: 22 July 2013
- Length: 52:05
- Label: ATP Recordings
- Producer: Fuck Buttons

Fuck Buttons chronology
Tarot Sport (2009)	Slow Focus (2013)

Singles from Slow Focus
- 1. "Brainfreeze" Released: 2013; 2. "The Red Wing" Released: 2013

Slow Focus is the third and final studio album by Fuck Buttons, released on 22 July 2013. It peaked at number 36 on the UK Albums Chart. It was the first album released by ATP Recordings to reach the top 40 of the UK Albums Chart.

== Critical reception ==
Professional ratings
Aggregate scores
Source	Rating
AnyDecentMusic?	7.8/10
Metacritic	81/100
Review scores
Source	Rating
AllMusic	4/5 stars
The A.V. Club	B+
The Guardian	4/5 stars
The Independent	4/5 stars
NME	8/10
Pitchfork	8.7/10
Q	4/5 stars
Rolling Stone	3/5 stars
Spin	8/10
Tiny Mix Tapes	2/5 stars
Uncut	8/10

Upon its release, Slow Focus received critical acclaim. At Metacritic, which assigns a weighted average score out of 100 to reviews and ratings from mainstream critics, the album has received a score of 81, based on 39 reviews, indicating "universal acclaim".

AllMusic reviewer Heather Phares noted that Fuck Buttons' self production work was a measure of "how much they've come into their own" and that "Slow Focus delivers some of their most masterful and seemingly effortless music yet." Mike Madden, writing for Consequence of Sound, described it as "a seven-track ride at turns gloopy and glassy, invigorating and dark," noting that "all told, this is pretty epic stuff." Drowned in Sound critic Andrzej Lukowski observed that Slow Focus displayed "a strange, alien detachment" with an "undercurrent of menace", but stated that the album "isn't alienating, it's other, and it's a pleasure to take a wander around its unfamiliar landscapes". In his review for The Guardian where he commented that Slow Focus "seems slightly more commercial than its predecessor, although such things are obviously relative," Alexis Petridis concluded that "the only real response is to listen and gawp." NME reviewer Noel Gardner opined that it was "all-consuming and consistently impressive from the off" and stated that the band "can be proud of what they continue to achieve."

=== Year-end rankings ===
Publication	List	Rank	Ref
The A.V. Club	The 23 Best Albums of 2013	12	
Bleep	Top Albums of the Year 2013	9	
Clash	Clash's Top Albums of 2013	19	
Crack Magazine	Top 100 Albums of 2013	44	
musicOMH	Top 100 Albums of 2013	36	
NME	NME's 50 Best Albums of 2013	40	
Pitchfork	Top 50 Best Albums of 2013	46	
Rolling Stone	50 Best Albums of 2013	48	
Slant Magazine	The 25 Best Albums of 2013	19	
Under the Radar	Top 125 Albums of 2013	91	

"N/A" indicates that the publication did not rank the works included in their year-end list.

=== Track Accolades ===
Track	Publication	List	Rank	Ref
"Hidden Xs"	Bleep	Top 100 Tracks of 2013	N/A	

"N/A" indicates that the publication did not rank the works included in their year-end list.

== Track listing ==
All tracks are written by Fuck Buttons.

No.	Title	Length
1.	"Brainfreeze"	8:33
2.	"Year of the Dog"	4:38
3.	"The Red Wing"	7:48
4.	"Sentients"	6:24
5.	"Prince's Prize"	4:22
6.	"Stalker"	10:08
7.	"Hidden Xs"	10:12

== Personnel ==
Credits adapted from liner notes.

- Fuck Buttons – music, production, recording, mixing
- Mat Rowlands – initial track recording
- Nina Walsh – initial track recording
- Jimmy Robertson – mix engineering
- Bob Weston – mastering
- Benjamin John Power – artwork
- Alex de Mora – photography

== Charts ==
Chart	Peak position
Belgian Albums (Ultratop Flanders)	48
Belgian Albums (Ultratop Wallonia)	138
UK Albums (OCC)	36
