= Formaldehyde (song) =

Single by Editors

from the album The Weight of Your Love
- Released: 2 September 2013
- Recorded: 2013
- Genre: Alternative rock
- Length: 3:50
- Label: PIAS Records
- Songwriter(s): Tom Smith, Russell Leetch, Edward Lay, Justin Lockey and Elliott Williams
- Producer(s): Jacquire King

Editors singles chronology
"A Ton of Love" (2013)	"Formaldehyde" (2013)	"Honesty" (2013)

"Formaldehyde" is a song by British recording group Editors. It was released on 2 September 2013 as the second single from the band's fourth studio album, The Weight of Your Love, on a 7" vinyl and as a digital download.

Editors' frontman Tom Smith described the song as "a love song. A sugar coated, dissected heart in a jar, blood soaked love song."

Professional ratings
Review scores
Source	Rating
Renowned for Sound	4/5 stars

== Music video ==
An official music video for the song was released onto YouTube on 8 August 2013. It was directed by Ben Wheatley, a critically acclaimed British feature film director, marking his debut in the music video genre. The video, which was shot in the style of old Spaghetti Westerns, stars Simon Smith and Tilly Gaunt.

"We shot on the old sets for Sergio Leone's Once Upon a Time in the West in Almería in Spain. It was quite an experience. The sun is so bright and strong (I've just shot four features in a row in the UK; that kind of thing impresses me!). The mountains look amazing and everywhere you look you feel the vibe of the Spaghetti Westerns," stated Wheatley. "We shot the promo in a day and it was pretty frantic but good fun. We worked with a great bunch of Spanish cowboy/stuntmen/extras who wore the incredibly heavy and awkward masks with good grace. Hopefully one day I will get to return to Almería and shoot a feature film."

Kevin Jagernauth of IndieWire wrote that "the results are appropriately freaky. The largely slow-mo video starts off with what appears to be a standard western setting, before some dudes in scary masks show up and the whole thing tips into the surreal by the finale. Yep, sounds like Wheatley."

== Track listings ==
No.	Title	Length
1.	"Formaldehyde"	3:50
2.	"A Ton of Love" (Acoustic)	3:11

== Charts ==
Chart performance for "Formaldehyde"
Chart (2013)	Peak position
Belgium (Ultratip Bubbling Under Flanders)	5
