= Vessels (band) =

English band

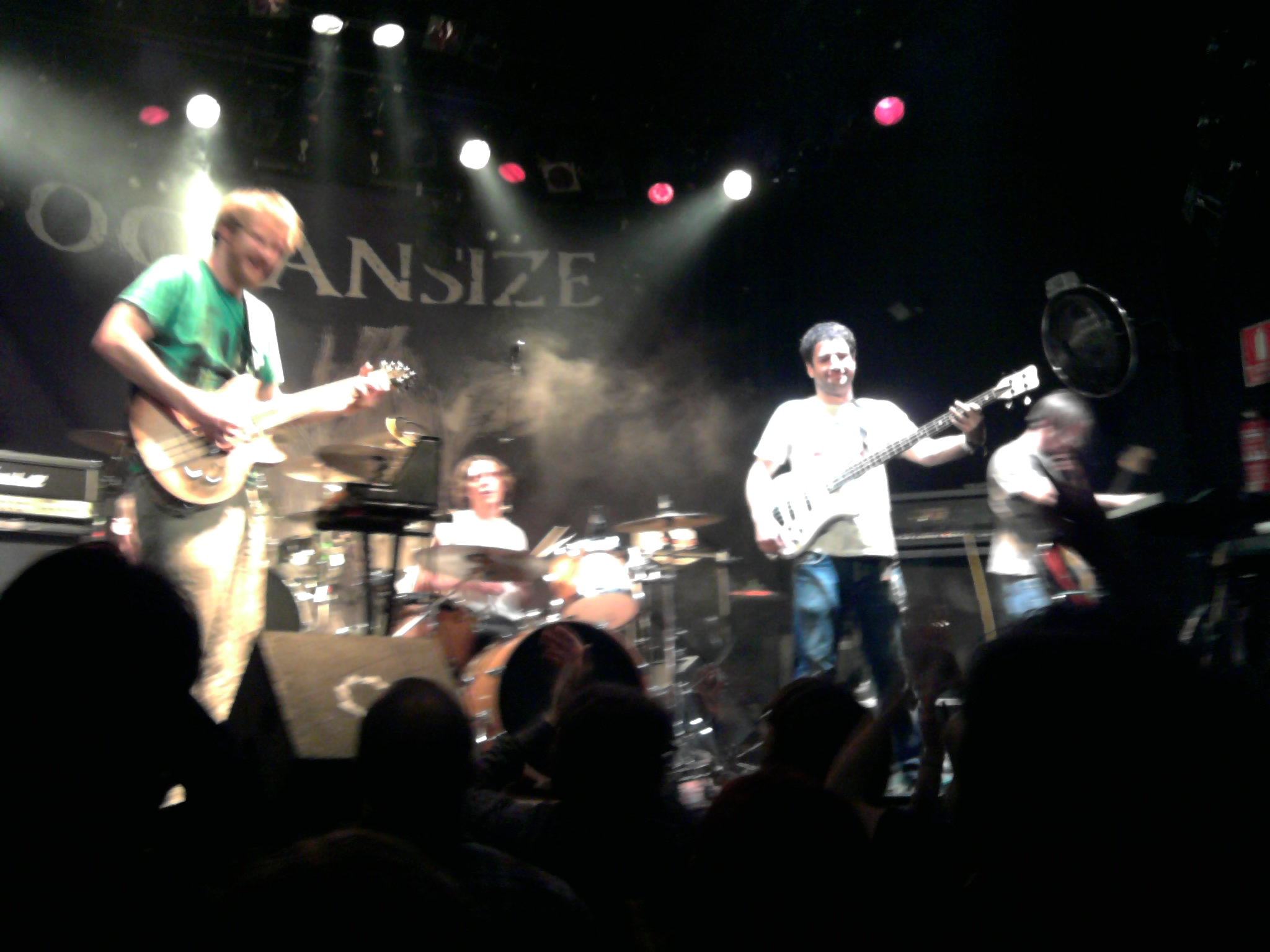

Background information
- Origin: Leeds, West Yorkshire, England
- Genres: Electronic, tech house, post-rock (early)
- Years active: 2005–present
- Labels: Cuckundoo Records, Bias
- Members: Tom Evans; Tim Mitchell; Martin Teff; Lee J. Malcolm; Peter Wright
- Website: Official site

Vessels are an English band from Leeds, West Yorkshire, England, who formed in 2005.

The band started out as a post-rock outfit, but later evolved into a live techno act, notably with the release of their third album, Dilate. Its follow-up, The Great Distraction, was released in 2017.

== History ==
Several members of Vessels had been playing music together since the early 2000s. They went through a few different lineups and band names before they formed Vessels in 2005.

On 5 March 2007, the band released a limited 7" single ("Yuki" / "Forever the Optimist") through Cuckundoo Records, and were tipped by BBC Radio 1 as one of the hottest new bands in the country. The band recorded a session for Huw Stephens's show on BBC Radio 1, which was broadcast on 29 March. This was followed by the addition of Peter Wright to the line-up. Another single, "Two Words & A Gesture", was released in November 2007.

Vessels travelled to Minneapolis, United States to record their debut album, White Fields and Open Devices, with producer John Congleton who had previously worked with fellow post-rock artists Explosions in the Sky and This Will Destroy You as well as Modest Mouse, at Pachyderm Studios in December 2007. They completed recording of the ten-track album in twelve days and returned to the UK for a nationwide tour. On 16 June they released the single "A Hundred Times In Every Direction". Their debut album was released on 18 August.

In May 2010 Vessels recorded the follow-up LP in Dallas, Texas, again with John Congleton and featuring vocals by Stuart Warwick of Jacob's Story. It was entitled Helioscope and was subsequently released in February 2011. In June 2011 Vessels headlined the BBC Introducing Stage at Glastonbury Festival. Reviews for Helioscope were above average included a 7.5 from Pitchfork Media and a 4.5 from Sputnik Music.

Vessels released a third album, Dilate, in March 2015. This record saw the band "moving away from the overt post-rock foundations of second album Helioscope" and into a more electronic sound. The music from Dilate is less guitar orientated and is instead based more heavily on synthesisers and percussion, leading to "danceable dynamics" that "resonate with focused heft and power". Metacritic, a website that gives an aggregate score based on numerous official and public reviews, gave the album a score of 77/100.

Dilate was followed by The Great Distraction, released on 29 September 2017 by Different Recordings. The album featured several guest vocalists including John Grant and Wayne Coyne of The Flaming Lips. This album "marks a further evolution for the group" who "have steadily pushed the boundaries of their post-rock foundations, with each of their...studio albums edging further into electronica territory".

== Members ==
- Tom Evans - electronics, vocals
- Tim Mitchell - drums
- Martin Teff - guitar, bass, synth
- Lee J. Malcolm - electronics, synth, drums
- Peter Wright - electronics

== Discography ==
=== Studio albums ===
- White Fields and Open Devices (2008) – Cuckundoo Records
- Helioscope (2011) – Cuckundoo Records
- Dilate (2015) – The Leaf Label
- The Great Distraction (2017) – Different Recordings

=== Other albums ===
- Retreat - Limited Tour CD (2009) – Cuckundoo Records - a collection of remixes

=== EPs ===
- Vessels (2006)
- Elliptic (2013)

=== Singles ===
- "Yuki" / "Forever The Optimist" (2007) - Cuckundoo Records
- "Two Words & A Gesture" (2007) - Cuckundoo Records
- "A Hundred Times In Every Direction" (2008) (download only) - Cuckundoo Records
- "Meatman, Piano Turner, Prostitute" feat. Stuart Warwick - (8 November 2010) - Cuckundoo Records
- "On Monos" (download only) (2014) - Bias
