= Forgiveness (Editors song) =

Single by Editors

from the album In Dream
- Released: 31 March 2016
- Recorded: 2014–2015
- Studio: Crear Studio, Scotland
- Genre: Dark pop; gothic pop
- Length: 3:45
- Label: PIAS Records
- Songwriter(s): Tom Smith, Russell Leetch, Edward Lay, Justin Lockey and Elliott Williams

Editors singles chronology
"Ocean of Night" (2015)	"Forgiveness" (2016)	"All the Kings" (2016)

"Forgiveness" is a single by British indie rock band, Editors. The song is the thirdtrack and the fifth single off of their fifth studio album, In Dream, and was released as a single through PIAS Recordings on 31 March 2016.

== Style ==
Laurence Day, writing for The Line of Best Fit, described the song as a Gothic, dark pop song. Day described the tone of the track as "an overtly political glimpse into a murky corner of Editors' psyche, with hushed shoulder-shuffle beats and infectious, echoing riffs. It's glossy and catchy, shimmering out your speakers, but an omnipresent deluge of shadows looms large overhead - Editors continue to strike the perfect balance between light and dark."

Writing for XS Noise, Mark Millar called "Forgiveness" as a track that "amply demonstrates [a] desire to ignore genres by mixing a loose dancefloor beat with spiraling melodies and a highly politicized lyric."

== Charts ==
Chart (2016)	Peak position
Belgium (Ultratip Bubbling Under Flanders)	46
