= Sugar (Editors song) =

Single by Editors

from the album The Weight of Your Love
- Released: 24 March 2014
- Recorded: 2013
- Genre: Alternative rock
- Length: 4:16
- Label: PIAS
- Songwriter(s): Tom Smith; Russell Leetch; Edward Lay; Justin Lockey; Elliott Williams

Editors singles chronology
"Honesty" (2013)	"Sugar" (2014)	"No Harm" (2015)

"Sugar" is a song by British post-punk revival band Editors from their fourth studio album The Weight of Your Love. The song was released as the fourth single from the album on 24 March 2014.

== Track listing ==
Digital download
No.	Title	Length
1.	"Sugar"	4:16
2.	"Sugar" (Matthew Dear Remix)	6:04
3.	"Sugar" (Matthew Dear Remix; instrumental)	6:04

== Charts ==
Chart performance for "Sugar"
Chart (2014)	Peak position
Belgium (Ultratip Bubbling Under Flanders)	4
