= Cesar Merveille =

- Born: 1981 (age 43–44)
- Origin: Paris, France
- Genres: Techno, House, deep house, tech house
- Occupation(s): Musician, producer, disc jockey
- Labels: Circus Company, Visionquest, Cadenza, Lessizmore, Lokee Music

Cesar Merveille is a Parisian born DJ and record producer currently residing in Berlin.

== Early career ==
Influenced by jazz from a young age, Merveille learned to play guitar and later discovered electronic music through friends involved in throwing the Circus Company parties in Paris.

He began producing songs whilst still living in Paris but moved to London in 2003. That same year his debut release, "Transit", came out on Circus Company under the name Kean & 16. Cesar studied at London College of Communication where he completed a degree in graphic and media design. Following the completion of his degree in 2007, Merveille founded a visual design company called Hijackstudio whilst still continuing to produce music. In 2008 he released Chocopop Jazz under the name Cesar Maravillas, which sampled the Dave Brubeck Quartet 5/4 arrangement "Take Five". Chocopop Jazz was released on Remake Music with support from Luciano and Rhadoo.

== Progression and affiliation with Cadenza ==
Merveille held residencies for Lo*Kee events and at T-Bar in London. In 2009 he ended his work on Hijackstudio to pursue his music full-time. Merveille shared his T-Bar residency with fellow London DJ Pablo Cahn-Speyer. A collaboration between Merveille and Cahn-Speyer, called ‘Descarga’, was released in 2009 on Luciano's Cadenza label and the two followed up with the Split EP in 2010. The Split EP came third in the 2010 Best Art Vinyl competition which is decided by the public from a shortlist of 50 sleeve designs. Merveille's first solo release on Cadenza, ‘Maayancholy’ came two years later and featured a 16 minute long remix from label boss Luciano. Merveille began playing at bigger venues such as Fabric (London), Watergate & Panorama Bar in Berlin. Merveille has remained a in the lineups of Luciano's Vagabundos club nights as well as Luciano & Friends nights in several countries.

=== DRM ===
After nine years of living in London, Merveille moved to Berlin in 2011, where he began working with Ryan Crosson, one third of the Visionquest trio alongside Lee Curtiss & Shaun Reeves. Together they produced two EP's DRM Part 1 & the vinyl only DRM Part 2 as well as a full-length DRM album released on Visionquest as Merveille & Crosson.

== Roche Madame ==
In 2016 Merveille launched a vinyl-only label called Roche Madame, inspired by a secret family location off the coast of Brittany. He has released on the label under the pseudonym C.S.R. The label's artwork is created by Merveille. Roche Madame had commercial success in 2016 and hosted a party in collaboration with London promoters Unleash at Studio Spaces in Wapping. It now has residencies at the infamous Club der Visionaere and Hoppetosse.
