= Dumb Flesh =

Studio album by Blanck Mass
- Released: 11 May 2015
- Genre: Electronica, drone, noise
- Length: 49:38
- Label: Sacred Bones Records

Blanck Mass chronology
Blanck Mass (2011)	Dumb Flesh (2015)	World Eater (2017)

Singles from Dumb Flesh
- 1. "No Lite" Released: 12 October 2015

Dumb Flesh is the second studio album by the English experimental musician Blanck Mass, released on 11 May 2015.

== Critical reception ==
Professional ratings
Aggregate scores
Source	Rating
Metacritic	77/100
Review scores
Source	Rating
AllMusic	4/5 stars
Consequence of Sound	B
Drowned in Sound	7/10
Exclaim!	8/10
Pitchfork	7.6/10
PopMatters	8/10 stars
Resident Advisor	3.6/5
The New York Times	positive
The Quietus	positive
musicOMH	3.5/5 stars

Dumb Flesh was met with positive critical reviews. At Metacritic, which assigns a weighted average score out of 100 to reviews and ratings from mainstream critics, the album has received a score of 77, based on 19 reviews, indicating "generally favorable reviews".

AllMusic reviewer Heather Phares awarded the album four out of five stars and observed that:"loaded with undeniable hooks and beats, the album is "dumb" in the best way possible, and embraces the "flesh" part of its title by making bodies move." Nina Corcoran, writing for Consequence of Sound:"The album is vivid between shadows, pulsing with the diseased blood of a body slowly losing its motivation to carry on." Tristan Bath from Drowned in Sound opined that it was:"This is beautiful, disgusting, danceable, and nightmarish music." Pitchfork critic Nathan Reese observed that:"... their music's pure momentum almost guaranteed its audience by force alone." Ian King, writing for PopMatters, rated the album eight stars out of ten and described it as:"Powers puts the body at the forefront of his audience's mind is by suggesting that they move it." Exclaim! reviewer Daniel Sylvester, who scored the album eight out of ten, opined that: "As one half of electronic psych drone purveyors Fuck Buttons, Power originally created Blanck Mass to explore beatless and formless ambient music. With the release of his follow-up, Dumb Flesh, Power abandons this singular musical mode, bringing with him myriad recording styles and techniques."

Ben Ratliff from The New York Times commented that: "he's giving you something you might find familiar or even commercial by its basic outlines. But he's still got ways to make it uncanny: close, loud and abrupt." The Quietus reviewer James Ubaghs observed that:"A reoccurring feature is the way that vocal samples frequently sound like synths, and synths sound almost like vocals, on the verge of attaining sentience." Sam Shepherd, in his review for musicOMH commented:"There are some fine moments here, but all too often Dumb Flesh seems like a diluted version of Fuck Buttons."

== Track listing ==
All tracks are written by John Power.

No.	Title	Length
1.	"Loam"	4:06
2.	"Dead Format"	6:15
3.	"No Lite"	9:56
4.	"Atrophies"	5:07
5.	"Cruel Sport"	8:42
6.	"Double Cross"	5:37
7.	"Lung"	5:27
8.	"Detritus"	8:13

Vinyl bonus track
No.	Title	Length
9.	"Life Science (Ambient Suite)"	17:02
