= Street Horrrsing =

Studio album by Fuck Buttons
- Released: 17 March 2008
- Genre: Electronic; noise; post-rock; drone
- Length: 49:38
- Label: ATP Recordings

Fuck Buttons chronology
Street Horrrsing (2008)	Tarot Sport (2009)

Singles from Street Horrrsing
- 1. "Bright Tomorrow" Released: 2007; 2. "Colours Move" Released: 2008

Street Horrrsing is the debut studio album by the British duo Fuck Buttons, released on 17 March 2008 on ATP Recordings. It peaked at number 23 on the UK Independent Albums Chart.

== Critical reception ==
Professional ratings
Aggregate scores
Source	Rating
Metacritic	80/100
Review scores
Source	Rating
AllMusic	4/5 stars
The A.V. Club	B−
The Irish Times	4/5 stars
Mojo	4/5 stars
Pitchfork	8.6/10
Spin	3/5 stars
Uncut	4/5 stars
URB	4/5 stars

At Metacritic, which assigns a weighted average score out of 100 to reviews from mainstream critics, the album received an average score of 80, based on 19 reviews, indicating "generally favorable reviews".

Pitchfork placed it at number 20 on the "50 Best Albums of 2008" list.

== Track listing ==
All tracks are written by Fuck Buttons.

No.	Title	Length
1.	"Sweet Love for Planet Earth"	9:40
2.	"Ribs Out"	3:57
3.	"Okay, Let's Talk About Magic"	10:08
4.	"Race You to My Bedroom / Spirit Rise"	9:18
5.	"Bright Tomorrow"	7:41
6.	"Colours Move"	8:54

== Personnel ==
Credits adapted from liner notes.

- Fuck Buttons – music
- Tim Cedar – recording
- John Cummings – recording, mixing
- Bob Weston – mastering
- Benjamin John Power – artwork

== Charts ==
Chart	Peak position
UK Independent Albums (OCC)	23
