= Honesty (Editors song) =

Single by Editors

from the album The Weight of Your Love
- Released: 25 November 2013
- Recorded: 2013
- Genre: Alternative rock
- Length: 4:49
- Label: PIAS Records
- Songwriter(s): Edward Lay, Russell Leetch, Justin Lockey, Tom Smith, Elliott Williams
- Producer(s): Jacquire King

Editors singles chronology
"Formaldehyde" (2013)	"Honesty" (2013)	"Sugar" (2014)

"Honesty" is a song by British post-punk revival band Editors. It was released digitally on 25 November 2013, as the third single to promote the band's fourth studio album, The Weight of Your Love.

== Composition ==
"Honesty" was written by Edward Lay, Russell Leetch, Justin Lockey, Tom Smith and Elliott Williams. The song is a "string-driven midtempo ballad," and "a soaring, vulnerable number complete with Tom Smith's signature baritone vocals- and a touch of falsetto. The atmospheric track continues to build in momentum as it proceeds, telling the familiar tale of a broken heart atop an anthemic chorus, dramatic drums and spectacular strings."

== Music video ==
A music video for the song, directed by Favourite Colour: Black, was released on 21 October 2013. It was filmed on 20 September 2013 around Soho and Shaftesbury Avenue in London. It features "a hen party, a young streetwise girl and a scary-looking vagrant." "It's all shot from my point of view, and I kind of encounter all these 'undesirables' along the way," said Editors' frontman Tom Smith in an interview with XFM.

== Track listing ==
Digital download – single
No.	Title	Length
1.	"Honesty"	4:49
2.	"Honesty" (Timothy J. Fairplay Remix)	6:14

== Charts ==
Chart performance for "Honesty"
Chart (2013)	Peak position
Belgium (Ultratip Bubbling Under Flanders)	3
