= A Ton of Love =

Single by Editors

from the album The Weight of Your Love
- Released: 24 June 2013
- Recorded: 2013
- Genre: Post-punk revival, alternative rock
- Length: 3:58
- Label: PIAS Records
- Songwriter(s): Tom Smith, Russell Leetch, Edward Lay, Justin Lockey and Elliott Williams
- Producer(s): Jacquire King

Editors singles chronology
"No Sound But the Wind" (2010)	"A Ton of Love" (2013)	"Formaldehyde" (2013)

"A Ton of Love" is the first single from British post-punk revival band Editors from their 2013 album, The Weight of Your Love.

The song first aired on 6 May 2013 on Zane Lowe's BBC Radio 1 show, with the music video being released on the same day. It was made available as a download from midnight on 6 May 2013, included in the pre-order of the album The Weight of Your Love on the iTunes Store. The single was released as a digital download on 14 June 2013, and is set to be released on 7” vinyl on 24 June 2013.

== Track listings ==
7" single
No.	Title	Length
1.	"A Ton of Love"	3:58
2.	"The Sting"	4:04

Digital Download
No.	Title	Length
1.	"A Ton of Love"	3:58
2.	"The Weight"	4:32
3.	"The Sting"	4:04

== Chart performance ==
Chart (2013)	Peak position
Belgium (Ultratop 50 Flanders)	32
Belgium (Ultratip Bubbling Under Wallonia)	82
Netherlands (Single Top 100)	54
Switzerland Airplay (Schweizer Hitparade)	85
