= Tarot Sport =

Studio album by Fuck Buttons
- Released: 14 October 2009
- Genre: Indie electronic; post-rock; techno; shoegaze; noise
- Length: 58:35
- Label: ATP Recordings
- Producer: Andrew Weatherall

Fuck Buttons chronology
Street Horrrsing (2008)	Tarot Sport (2009)	Slow Focus (2013)

Singles from Tarot Sport
- 1. "Surf Solar" Released: 2009; 2. "Olympians" Released: 2010

Tarot Sport is the second studio album by the British duo Fuck Buttons, released on 14 October 2009 in the UK on ATP Recordings and on 20 October in the US. It was produced by the English electronic producer Andrew Weatherall. It peaked at number 79 on the UK Albums Chart. The tracks "Surf Solar" and "Olympians" were played during the 2012 Summer Olympics opening ceremony.

== Critical reception ==
Professional ratings
Aggregate scores
Source	Rating
AnyDecentMusic?	8.2/10
Metacritic	84/100
Review scores
Source	Rating
AllMusic	4/5 stars
The A.V. Club	A−
The Daily Telegraph	4/5 stars
The Guardian	4/5 stars
Mojo	4/5 stars
NME	8/10
Pitchfork	9.0/10
Q	4/5 stars
Spin	6/10
Uncut	4/5 stars

Tarot Sport was met with positive critical reviews, earning a score of 84 out of 100 on review aggregator Metacritic based on 21 professional reviews. Andrzej Lukowski of Drowned in Sound wrote that "If it doesn't necessarily resonate with the times, it ought to resonate by dint of sheer, joyous momentum." With a score of 8.3, it is also an AnyDecentMusic? Chart Topper.

=== Accolades ===
- 11th – Pitchfork
- 21st – Rhapsody

== Track listing ==
All tracks are written by Fuck Buttons.

No.	Title	Length
1.	"Surf Solar"	10:34
2.	"Rough Steez"	4:44
3.	"The Lisbon Maru"	9:19
4.	"Olympians"	10:54
5.	"Phantom Limb"	4:49
6.	"Space Mountain"	8:44
7.	"Flight of the Feathered Serpent"	9:31

== Personnel ==
Credits adapted from liner notes.

- Fuck Buttons – music
- Andrew Weatherall – production
- Steve Boardman – engineering, additional programming
- Bob Weston – mastering
- Benjamin John Power – artwork
- Lucy Johnston – photography

== Charts ==
Chart	Peak position
UK Albums (OCC)	79
