= The Great Distraction =

Studio album by Vessels
- Released: 29 September 2017
- Label: Different Recordings

Vessels chronology
| Dilate (2015) | The Great Distraction (2017) |

The Great Distraction is the fourth studio album by English electronic music group Vessels, released on 29 September 2017 on Different Recordings. Critical reception was mixed to decent.

Professional ratings
Aggregate scores
| Source | Rating |
|---|---|
| Album of the Year | 71/100 |
| AnyDecentMusic? | 6.5/10 |
Review scores
| Source | Rating |
| AllMusic | 3.5/5 stars |
| Crackle Feedback | 3.1/5 stars |
| Crack Magazine | 5/10 |
| DIY | 4/5 stars |
| DJ Mag | 8.5/10 |
| God is in the TV | 8/10 |
| The Irish Times | 2/5 stars |
| The Line of Best Fit | 7.5/10 |
| The Music | 4/5 stars |
| The Skinny | 4/5 stars |
