= World Eater =

Studio album by Blanck Mass
- Released: 3 March 2017
- Genre: Electronic
- Length: 48:54
- Label: Sacred Bones

Blanck Mass chronology
Dumb Flesh (2015)	World Eater (2017)	Blanck Mass (2019)

Singles from World Eater
- 1. "Please" Released: 10 January 2017; 2. "Silent Treatment" Released: 2 February 2017

World Eater is the third studio album by British musician Benjamin John Power, under his musical project Blanck Mass. It was released on 3 March 2017 by Sacred Bones Records.

== Production ==
World Eater was recorded in Power's home studio in Tranent, Scotland.

== Artwork ==
The album's artwork shows a close up picture of an animal's bare teeth, to which Power explained: "Fear and hope are both parts of our human make up, but it's the way that we act upon these feelings that is of concern to me – to understand the beast or to become the beast."

== Release ==
On 10 January 2017, Blanck Mass announced the release of his third studio album World Eater. In a statement of the release, Power explained:

"The title is a reference to both the inner beast inside human beings that when grouped en-masse stops us from moving forward towards good. Being surrounded by so much hate in the world right now throws a whole new light on the importance of love. I have never set out to make a protest record. I’ve never set out to make any kind of record really, but during the creative process for this and any of my past releases I start to form a bond with the project as we grow together."

=== Singles ===
The first single "Please" was released on 10 January 2017, the same day as the album release announcement. The Line of Best Fit described "Please" as being "jammed with mayhem and bursting with tormented vocal shards."

On 2 February 2017, the second single "Silent Treatment" was released. Describing the single, Powers said: ""Silent Treatment" is about the problems that arise when we don't communicate. We often grow apart when we don't understand each other. Being left in the dark can lead to fear." Pitchfork described the single as "jagged shards of euphoric instrumentals, piles on samples of disembodied vocals, and ratchets up the tempo until the song's intensity reaches an uncomfortable extreme. At its peak, the song evokes the feeling of a dance floor freak-out." Stereogum described "Silent Treatment" as a "beast of a track that's both beautiful and punishing, building choral samples and sheets of static into an overwhelming, transcendent experience."

=== Music videos ===
The official music video for "Please" was released on Power's Facebook and YouTube on 16 February 2017. The animated video was created by Michael Tan.

On 19 July 2017, the second music video "The Rat" was released, and shows Power riding on a theme park attraction for majority of the video. In a press release, Power spoke of the video: "The video itself is a bit of fun and was filmed on a family vacation, but somehow I feel it represents discontent within a capitalist regime and a world full of sugar-coated shit."

== Tour ==
In support of the album, Power went on a tour of Europe and the UK, starting on 31 March 2017 at the Rewire Festival in the Netherlands, and finishing up at The Lantern in Bristol, London on 29 April 2017.

== Critical reception ==
Professional ratings
Aggregate scores
Source	Rating
AnyDecentMusic?	7.6/10
Metacritic	81/100
Review scores
Source	Rating
AllMusic	4/5 stars
DIY	4/5 stars
Drowned in Sound	7/10
Exclaim!	8/10
The Line of Best Fit	8.5/10
Loud and Quiet	8/10
MusicOMH	4/5 stars
Paste	8.6/10
Pitchfork	8.1/10
PopMatters	7/10

World Eater was met with "universal acclaim" reviews from critics. At Metacritic, which assigns a weighted average rating out of 100 to reviews from mainstream publications, this release received an average score of 81 based on 23 reviews. Aggregate website AnyDecentMusic? gave the release a 7.6 out of 10 based on a critical consensus of 23 reviews.

In a review for AllMusic, critic reviewer Heather Phares wrote: "Benjamin John Power transforms furious noise, drones, and the surprisingly danceable elements of Dumb Flesh into vivid portraits of division and turmoil that sound big enough to engulf a planet and intricate enough to consume it from within. World Eater's focused chaos is some of his finest work yet." At Exclaim!, Tom Beedham said: "Power's music has consistently found space for stark, cathartic purges, but World Eater matches its brutal releases with hope and luminosity. It's a radical, adventurous exploration — and celebration — of the relationship between darkness and light." Robert Ham of Paste stated: "The mixture of gentility and dissonance is somehow more unsettling than if Power was to go full on into harsher, angrier territory. The balance that he maintains throughout is what makes the album work."

=== Accolades ===
Publications' year-end list appearances for World Eater
Critic/Publication	List	Rank
Bleep	Bleep's Top 10 Albums of 2017	3
Drowned in Sound	Drowned in Sound's Top 100 Albums of 2017	99
Fopp	Fopp's Top 100 Albums of 2017	36
Loud and Quiet	Loud and Quiet's Top 40 Albums of 2017	6
Mixmag	Mixmag's Top 50 Albums of 2017	32
No Ripcord	No Ripcord's Top 50 Albums of 2017	16
Pitchfork	Pitchfork's Top 20 Experimental Albums of 2017	6
PopMatters	PopMatters' Top 60 Albums of 2017	26
PopMatters	PopMatters' Top 10 Experimental Albums of 2017	7
Rough Trade	Rough Trade's Top 100 Albums of 2017	100
Rolling Stone	Rolling Stone's Top 20 Avant Albums of 2017	2
The Skinny	The Skinny's Top 50 Albums of 2017	41
SputnikMusic	SputnikMusic's Top 50 Albums of 2017	39
Stereogum	Stereogum's Top 50 Albums of 2017 − Mid-Year	46
Treble	Treble's Top 50 Albums of 2017	46
Under the Radar	Under the Radar's Top 100 Albums of 2017	91
Uncut	Uncut's Top 75 Albums of 2017	64

== Track listing ==
World Eater track listing
No.	Title	Length
1.	"John Doe's Carnival of Error"	2:35
2.	"Rhesus Negative"	9:08
3.	"Please"	7:28
4.	"The Rat"	6:09
5.	"Silent Treatment"	7:35
6.	"Minnesota/Eas Fors/Naked"	7:28
7.	"Hive Mind"	8:31
