= Blanck Mass =

British electronic solo project

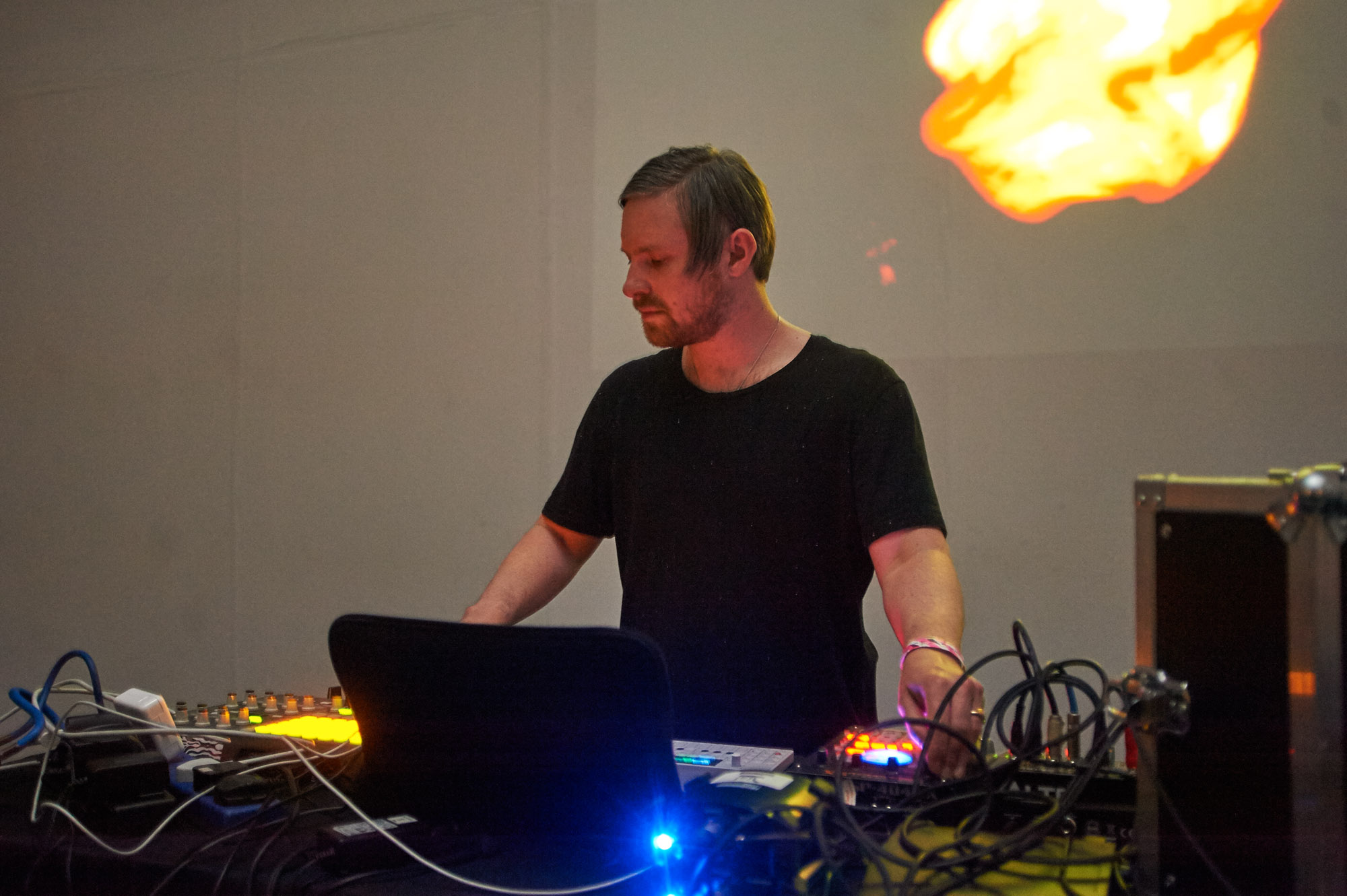
- Blanck Mass in July 2015

Background information
- Born: Benjamin John Power; September 10, 1982 (age 43); London, England
- Origin: Worcester, England
- Genres: electronic, drone, industrial, experimental, ambient, techno
- Occupations: Musician, composer, producer, soundtrack composer
- Years active: 2011–present (solo project; active earlier with Fuck Buttons)
- Labels: Rock Action, Sacred Bones, Weirding Way, Invada Records
- Formerly of: Fuck Buttons, Editors
- Website: blanckmass.com

Blanck Mass is the electronic solo project of British composer and producer Benjamin John Power (born 10 September 1982). Best known for dense, textural electronic compositions that draw on drone, industrial, noise and metal music, Blanck Mass emerged as Power's primary solo vehicle while he was also half of the duo Fuck Buttons. Since the project's debut in 2011, Blanck Mass has released studio albums, EPs and film/TV scores, and has produced remixes and collaborations for a wide range of artists. In 2022, Power joined the band Editors as a full-time member while continuing his solo work as Blanck Mass. He made one album with the band, EBM, before leaving the band in 2025.

== Career ==
Origins and early solo work (2011–2014)

Blanck Mass began as Benjamin John Power's solo outlet while Fuck Buttons were on hiatus. The self-titled debut album Blanck Mass was released on Mogwai’s Rock Action label in 2011 and established Power's interest in extended drones, harsh textures and immersive electronic soundscapes. The record was followed by a growing live presence and a series of singles and remix work for other artists. The track ‘Sundowner’ was featured in the Opening Ceremony at the 2012 Olympic Games in London.

Breakthrough: Dumb Flesh and subsequent albums (2015–2019)

Power signed to Sacred Bones Records and released Dumb Flesh in May 2015, an album that incorporated heavier rhythms, chopped vocal samples and a greater emphasis on movement and dancefloor dynamics while retaining abrasive sonics. Subsequent studio albums included World Eater (2017) and Animated Violence Mild (2019), each expanding his palette of rhythms, noise, and cinematic detail.

Film, TV and scoring work (2013–present)

Alongside albums, Blanck Mass has written music for cinema and television. Notable soundtrack and score releases include Calm with Horses (original score), Ted K (original motion picture score, 2022) and scores for other film/TV projects and limited series. Power's cinematic work demonstrates his aptitude for mood, tension and texture in audiovisual contexts. In 2021 his work as composer for Nick Rowland's Calm with Horses was recognised with the Ivor Novello award for Best Original Film Score.

Collaborations and band work

Power continues to collaborate with other musicians and remix artists across genres. In 2022 he was announced as a full-time member of Editors while continuing Blanck Mass releases and scoring work. He has remixed and been remixed by artists including Sigur Rós and others, and his material has been used in large public events and media placements.

== Musical style and influences ==
Blanck Mass's music is frequently described as a hybrid of drone, industrial noise and electronic dance music — often cinematic, immersive and loud. Power uses modular synthesisers, found sounds, heavily processed samples (including vocal fragments), and careful rhythmic processing to generate tension and release. Interviews and press have linked his music to interests in natural phenomena, large-scale atmospheres and the aesthetics of both decay and euphoria.

== Discography ==
Albums

- Blanck Mass (20 June 2011, Rock Action)
- Dumb Flesh (11 May 2015, Sacred Bones)
- World Eater (3 March 2017, Sacred Bones)
- Animated Violence Mild (16 August 2019, Sacred Bones)
- In Ferneaux (26 February 2021, Sacred Bones)
- Mind Killer (14 May 2021, Weirding Way)

Soundtracks

- Calm with Horses (13 March 2020, Invada Records)
- Ted K (18 March 2022, Invada Records)
- Gazza (21 November 2022, Weirding Way)
- Floodlights (2022, unreleased)
- The Rig - Prime Video Original Series (6 January 2023, Invada Records)
- The Rig Season 2 - Prime Video Original Series (2 January 2025, Invada Records)
- She Rides Shotgun (1 August 2025, Lakeshore Records & Invada Records)
- Crime 101 (13 February 2026, Lakeshore Records & Invada Records)

Singles and EPs

- "White Math / Polymorph" (21 August 2012, Software Recording Co.)
- "Hellion Earth" (21 December 2012)
- "No Lite" (12 October 2015, Sacred Bones)
- The Great Confuso EP (26 October 2015, Sacred Bones)
- "D7-D5" (4 November 2016, Richter Sound)
- "Odd Scene / Shit Luck" (21 April 2018, Sacred Bones)
- "World Eater Re-Voxed" (16 March 2018)
- The Blanck Mass Sessions (3 April 2019, PIAS, with Editors)
- "Bloodhound / You" (6 December 2024, Weirding Way)

Compilations

- A Field in England: Original Soundtrack Recording (18 October 2013, Death Waltz/Rook Films)
- Blanck Mass Presents – The Strange Colour of Your Body's Tears Re-Score (2015, Death Waltz Originals)

Remixes

As Blanck Mass:

- John Carpenter
- Mogwai
- Moby
- Placebo
- East India Youth
- Sigur Ros
- The Horrors
- Gazelle Twin
- Editors
- Deftones

Live Collaborations

- Part of Glenn Branca's 7 guitars + Drums Steve Reich piece @ ATP Minehead 2007
- 'Group leader' in Boredoms live performance at Station to Station (88 Cymbals) at Barbican, 2015
- Genesis Breyer P. Orridge / Edley ODowd / Blanck Mass improvised live performance at Sacred Bones 10 Year Anniversary, 2017

== Live performance ==
Blanck Mass has performed at festivals and on tours in Europe, North America and Australia, including support slots for acts such as Sigur Rós and headline shows where the project's live set emphasizes loud, immersive sound and extensive use of electronics and live processing.

== Reception ==
Critics have generally praised Blanck Mass for its textural ambition and the combination of noise aesthetics with propulsive rhythms. Albums such as Dumb Flesh and World Eater received coverage in major music outlets, and his soundtrack work has been noted for its capacity to support narrative tension. Specific reviews of Ted K and other scores highlight his facility with cinematic pacing and sonic density.

== Selected uses in media ==
Power's compositions (including tracks under Blanck Mass and remixes) have been used in film and televised contexts, and his music has appeared in festivals and public ceremonies (for example, press coverage has noted usage of the track “Sundowner” in high-profile contexts). His later career includes dedicated soundtrack commissions and score albums.
