= The Weight of Your Love =

Studio album by Editors
- Released: 28 June 2013
- Studio: Blackbird Studio, Nashville
- Genre: Indie rock; post-punk revival; alternative rock
- Length: 48:18
- Label: PIAS
- Producer: Jacquire King

Editors chronology
Unedited (2011)	The Weight of Your Love (2013)	In Dream (2015)

Singles from The Weight of Your Love
- 1. "A Ton of Love" Released: 24 June 2013; 2. "Formaldehyde" Released: 2 September 2013; 3. "Honesty" Released: 25 November 2013; 4. "Sugar" Released: 24 March 2014; 5. "What Is This Thing Called Love" Released: 8 August 2014

The Weight of Your Love is the fourth studio album from the British band Editors. It was released on 28 June 2013 by PIAS Recordings. The first single "A Ton of Love" first aired on 6 May 2013 on Zane Lowe's BBC Radio 1 show, with the music video being released on the same day.

This is the first Editors album recorded after the departure of lead guitarist Chris Urbanowicz on 16 April 2012. The band has released a statement on their official website saying it was "a decision entirely based upon future musical direction" and that Urbanowicz's departure was "entirely amicable". This is also the first album to feature new band members Justin Lockey and Elliott Williams.

== Overview ==
On the first recording sessions of the band's fourth studio album, frontman Tom Smith stated that it had been "a long, hard couple of years and it got pretty dark because whenever we tried creating new songs it wasn’t good enough. Chris's heart wasn’t in it any more. For a year, we'd leave rehearsals feeling very negative and uninspired."

However, in April 2012, the band stated on their official site that they were "super excited about working with the core of the band as a three-piece and trying to introduce new elements to Editors sound." In December of the same year, the band revealed on a Daily Star interview that they were ready to begin recording their fourth album after the departure of Chris Urbanowicz.

Lead singer Tom Smith also said that "I've talked for a long time about my love of American bands like R.E.M. and Arcade Fire, and that's the type of sound our new songs are going towards. They're more straightforward than our last album. That was more experimental, whereas the new songs could be played on an acoustic guitar. I don't know what a hit is any more, but these songs feel very classic and immediate."

The album was produced by Jacquire King and mixed by Craig Silvey. The band also worked with producer Flood, who had produced their previous album, In This Light and on This Evening.

The album was mostly recorded live. Regarding the sound of the album, lead singer Tom Smith stated that it "[has] a foot in that alt rock/Americana world" and that it feels "untouchable at times". Lyrically, the album focuses on "love songs... that don't adhere to the traditional love song type". Smith explained, "If I ever find myself writing something too straightforward, I try to twist it, so it ends up odd and baffling."

== Promotion and release ==
To promote the album, the band will make a series of festival performances across the summer of 2013, including headlining slots at Werchter Festival and Lowlands Festival, as well as several festivals in the United Kingdom, such as the Glastonbury Festival, T in the Park and Reading Festival. In Germany they played at Hurricane Festival and Southside Festival

The lead single "A Ton of Love", was made available as a download from midnight on 6 May 2013, included in the pre-order of the album on the iTunes Store. The single was released on 7" vinyl on 24 June 2013.

A promotional single "The Weight", was released on 8 July 2013 in Germany within Sonic Seducer music magazine. The second single from the album, "Formaldehyde", was released on 2 September 2013. A music video for the song premiered on YouTube on 8 August 2013. The third single to promote the album, "Honesty", was released on 25 November 2013. The fourth single, "Sugar", was released on 24 March 2014.

In 2014 it was awarded a double gold certification from the Independent Music Companies Association, which indicated sales of at least 150,000 copies throughout Europe.

== Critical reception ==
Professional ratings
Aggregate scores
Source	Rating
Metacritic	55/100
Review scores
Source	Rating
Allmusic	3.5/5 stars
The Guardian	2/5 stars
Mojo	4/5 stars
musicOMH	2.5/5 stars
NME	4/10
PopMatters	6/10
Q	3/5 stars
Slant	3.5/5 stars
Rolling Stone	1.5/5 stars
Uncut	2.5/5 stars

The Weight of your Love divided critics upon its release. While it was considered an excellent new approach on the band's usual formula by some reviewers, others called the album a decline compared to its predecessors. As a result of this discrepancy, The Weight of Your Love received generally mixed reviews from music critics. At Metacritic, which assigns a normalised rating from mainstream critics, the album received an average score of 55 out of 100, which indicates "mixed or average reviews", based on 22 reviews.

== Track listing ==
All songs written by Tom Smith, Russell Leetch, Edward Lay, Justin Lockey and Elliott Williams. All songs produced by Jacquire King except where noted.

No.	Title	Length
1.	"The Weight"	4:32
2.	"Sugar"	4:16
3.	"A Ton of Love"	3:58
4.	"What Is This Thing Called Love"	4:12
5.	"Honesty"	4:49
6.	"Nothing"	5:15
7.	"Formaldehyde"	3:50
8.	"Hyena"	3:39
9.	"Two Hearted Spider"	4:30
10.	"The Phone Book"	4:31
11.	"Bird of Prey"	4:46

Amazon.de bonus track
No.	Title	Length
12.	"Formaldehyde (Acoustic)"	4:37

Deluxe edition bonus disc
No.	Title	Producer(s)	Length
1.	"The Sting"	Jacquire King	4:08
2.	"Get Low"	Justin Lockey	3:30
3.	"Comrade Spill My Blood"	Justin Lockey	3:59
4.	"Hyena (Acoustic)"	Tim Baxter	3:44
5.	"Nothing (Acoustic)"	Tim Baxter	5:32

Japan edition bonus tracks
No.	Title	Length
12.	"The Sting"	4:04
13.	"A Ton of Love (Acoustic)"	3:12
14.	"Formaldehyde (Acoustic)"	4:37

Notes

- "The Weight" features additional vocals by Helen Atkinson.

== Charts ==
=== Weekly charts ===
Weekly chart performance for The Weight of Your Love
Chart (2013)	Peak position
Austrian Albums (Ö3 Austria)	10
Belgian Albums (Ultratop Flanders)	1
Belgian Albums (Ultratop Wallonia)	4
Danish Albums (Hitlisten)	21
Dutch Albums (Album Top 100)	1
Finnish Albums (Suomen virallinen lista)	43
French Albums (SNEP)	39
German Albums (Offizielle Top 100)	4
Greek Albums (IFPI Greece)	7
Irish Albums (IRMA)	9
Italian Albums (FIMI)	9
Polish Albums (ZPAV)	24
Portuguese Albums (AFP)	10
Scottish Albums (OCC)	7
Spanish Albums (PROMUSICAE)	43
Swiss Albums (Schweizer Hitparade)	4
UK Albums (OCC)	6
UK Independent Albums (OCC)	1
UK Album Downloads (OCC)	11

=== Year-end charts ===
2013 Year-end chart performance for The Weight of Your Love
Chart (2013)	Position
Belgian Albums (Ultratop Flanders)	7
Belgian Albums (Ultratop Wallonia)	72
Dutch Albums (Album Top 100)	45

2014 Year-end chart performance for The Weight of Your Love
Chart (2014)	Position
Belgian Albums (Ultratop Flanders)	66

== Certifications ==
Region	Certification	Certified units/sales
Belgium (BRMA)	Gold	15,000^{*}
United Kingdom (BPI)	Silver	60,000^{‡}
^{*} Sales figures based on certification alone.^{‡} Sales+streaming figures based on certification alone.

== Release history ==
Region	Date	Format	Label
Germany	28 June 2013	CD, digital download	PIAS Recordings
United Kingdom	1 July 2013	CD, digital download	PIAS Recordings
Poland	1 July 2013	CD, digital download	PIAS Recordings
United States	9 July 2013	CD, digital download	PIAS Recordings
