= No Harm =

Single by Editors

from the album In Dream
- Released: 20 April 2015
- Recorded: 2014
- Studio: Crear Studio, Scotland
- Genre: Gothic pop; post-rock
- Length: 5:07
- Label: PIAS Records
- Songwriter(s): Tom Smith, Russell Leetch, Edward Lay, Justin Lockey and Elliott Williams
- Producer(s): Rachel Goswell

Editors singles chronology
| "Sugar" (2014) | "No Harm" (2015) | "Marching Orders" (2015) |

"No Harm" is a single by British indie rock band, Editors. The song was the lead single off of their fifth studio album, In Dream, and was released through PIAS Recordings on 20 April 2015.

== Style ==
Andrew Tendell, writing for Gigwise called "No Harm" "a brooding, ominous and cinematic slow-burning" song. Describing it as a slow gothic and dark wave track.

== Charts ==
| Chart (2015) | Peak position |
|---|---|
| Belgium (Ultratip Bubbling Under Flanders) | 66 |
