= In Dream =

Studio album by Editors
- Released: 2 October 2015
- Recorded: 2014–2015
- Studios: Crear Studio, Scotland
- Length: 51:02
- Label: PIAS
- Producer: Editors

Editors chronology
The Weight of Your Love (2013)	In Dream (2015)	Violence (2018)

Singles from In Dream
- 1. "No Harm" Released: 20 April 2015; 2. "Marching Orders" Released: 19 June 2015; 3. "Life Is a Fear" Released: 12 August 2015; 4. "Ocean of Night" Released: 24 November 2015; 5. "Forgiveness" Released: 31 March 2016; 6. "All the Kings" Released: 16 June 2016

In Dream is the fifth studio album by British band Editors. It was produced by the band themselves and released on 2 October 2015 through PIAS Recordings.

== Background ==
On 15 July 2015, the band announced the album via Facebook and said in a statement: "Our last record was the sound of us learning to walk again, with new legs! In Dream, our first self produced album, is us diving into the computer, a real studio record, made in isolation by the 5 of us". According to Tom Smith, the record is driven by a belief that "music can be both pop and experimental."

"It feels like a progression from our third record. It was very electronic, but I feel like the last record had to be a guitar record to prove to ourselves that we could be a band," says Smith. "To us, it's interesting if it has a darkness. Whatever that is. On the lyric side of things, if I was singing about dancefloors or happier or rosier things, it wouldn't ring true for me. I don't think you need to be sad to write a sad song, everybody has a dark side."

In Dream is the second album to feature the new line-up of the band with Justin Lockey and Elliott Williams alongside founding members Tom Smith, Russell Leetch and Ed Lay. It was recorded in Crear in Scotland's Western Highlands and mixed in London by Alan Moulder. The album is Editors' first record to draw in other artists, with the band recruiting Slowdive's Rachel Goswell for vocal duties on "Ocean of Night", "The Law" and "Oh My World".

== Promotion and release ==
In support of the album, the band embarked on an 11-date UK and Ireland tour in October 2015. It was followed by a 31-date European tour in November and December, supported by The Twilight Sad.

On 20 April 2015, the first single from the album, "No Harm", was made available for free download. The track originally appeared on a compilation titled Celebrating 33 Years At 33 RPM by the label Play It Again Sam. Its official video, directed by Rahi Rezvani, was posted on their YouTube channel on 11 May 2015.

On 18 June, Editors released another Rahi Rezvani-directed video for the album's second single, "Marching Orders". The single was released in the form of 300 hand stamped 12" test pressings, randomly placed and sold in selected Oxfam stores in the UK, Germany and Belgium.

The third single, "Life Is a Fear", got its first airplay on Zane Lowe's Apple Music Beats 1 radio show on 11 August 2015. Its video, also directed by Rahi Rezvani, was uploaded to YouTube on the same day.

On 22 September 2015, "The Law" was made available on SoundCloud. The track was recorded with Rachel Goswell.

On the day of the album release, the band played an intimate concert at the Paard Van Troje venue in The Hague.

== Critical reception ==
Professional ratings
Aggregate scores
Source	Rating
Metacritic	66/100
Review scores
Source	Rating
AllMusic	4/5 stars
Drowned in Sound	(7/10)
Mojo	4/5 stars
Music News	4/5 stars
musicOMH	4/5 stars
Q	2/5 stars
Sputnikmusic	2.9/5
The Line of Best Fit	(7/10)
Uncut	2.5/5 stars
Under the Radar	(7.5/10)

In Dream received generally positive reviews from music critics. The album has received a score of 66 on review aggregator website Metacritic, which indicates "generally favorable reviews", based on 11 reviews. Matt Collar of AllMusic gave the album 4 out of 5 stars, saying that "Five albums into their career, Britain's post-punk stalwarts the Editors dig deep for a cohesive set of sophisticated, nuanced songs rife with a hard-won maturity, which still retain all of the intense emotionality of their debut." Graeme Marsh of musicOMH also gave the album 4 out of 5 stars and said that "From the haunting atmospherics to the ‘80s soaked electronica, there is much to love about the album." Under the Radar called the album "A darkly-tinged, arms-aloft surprise" and gave it 7.5/10. Andrew Trendell of Gigwise described the album as "a record that's not only highly evolved, but as rich as it is infectious - packed with life, colour, poetry and ideas. This is the kind of accomplished work of sophisticated pop that deserves to be filed alongside the likes of Depeche Mode and Radiohead." Mojo awarded the album an 8/10, saying that "the bulk of In Dream is much darker, much no less alluring". Lee Adcock of Drowned in Sound gave the album a 7/10, and said that "in spite of In Dream's polite frills, big crowdpleasers, and abstract ideals, Editors still hold fast to a sense of self that throbs harder than ever." Uncut gave a mixed review, calling the album "Hard, and not necessarily rewarding, work". Q also gave the album a mixed review, giving the album 2 out of 5 stars.

== Track listing ==
All songs written and composed by Tom Smith, Russell Leetch, Ed Lay, Justin Lockey and Elliott Williams.

Standard edition
No.	Title	Length
1.	"No Harm"	5:06
2.	"Ocean of Night"	5:05
3.	"Forgiveness"	3:44
4.	"Salvation"	5:02
5.	"Life Is a Fear"	4:24
6.	"The Law"	4:51
7.	"Our Love"	5:18
8.	"All the Kings"	4:53
9.	"At All Cost"	4:54
10.	"Marching Orders"	7:45

Phase Two (deluxe edition bonus tracks)
No.	Title	Length
11.	"Alternative: Forgiveness"	5:17
12.	"Alternative: No Harm"	3:39
13.	"Oh My World"	4:24
14.	"Alternative: Our Love"	3:38
15.	"Alternative: Life Is a Fear"	5:03
16.	"Harm"	2:24

Japan edition bonus tracks
No.	Title	Length
11.	"Marching Orders" (Michael Price Rework)	5:37
12.	"Alternative: Oh My World"	3:29

Notes

- "Ocean of Night", "The Law", "At All Cost" and "Oh My World" feature additional vocals by Rachel Goswell.
- All songs engineered by Justin Lockey.
- All songs mixed by Alan Moulder at Assault and Battery 1, except tracks 1, 2, 4 and 5 on Phase Two, mixed by Editors.
- All songs mastered by Matt Colton at Alchemy.
- Published by Strictly Confidential UK.
- Concept, photography, artwork and design by Rahi Rezvani.

== Charts ==
=== Weekly charts ===
Chart (2015)	Peak position
Australian Albums (ARIA)	91
Austrian Albums (Ö3 Austria)	15
Belgian Albums (Ultratop Flanders)	1
Belgian Albums (Ultratop Wallonia)	5
Dutch Albums (Album Top 100)	1
French Albums (SNEP)	47
German Albums (Offizielle Top 100)	11
Irish Albums (IRMA)	14
Italian Albums (FIMI)	11
Portuguese Albums (AFP)	25
Scottish Albums (Official Charts)	4
Swiss Albums (Schweizer Hitparade)	7
UK Albums (Official Charts)	5
UK Independent Albums (Official Charts)	1
US Heatseekers Albums (Billboard)	9

In 2016, it was awarded a gold certification from the Independent Music Companies Association, indicating sales of at least 75,000 copies throughout Europe.

=== Year-end charts ===
Chart (2015)	Position
Belgian Albums (Ultratop Flanders)	24
Belgian Albums (Ultratop Wallonia)	145
Dutch Albums (MegaCharts)	45
Chart (2016)	Position
Belgian Albums (Ultratop Flanders)	70

== Certifications ==
Region	Certification	Certified units/sales
Belgium (BRMA)	Gold	15,000^{*}
Netherlands (NVPI)	Gold	20,000^{‡}
^{*} Sales figures based on certification alone.^{‡} Sales+streaming figures based on certification alone.
