= Rahi Rezvani =

Iranian photographer and film director

- Born: 1978 (age 47–48); Tehran, Iran
- Education: The Royal Academy of Art, Tehran University of Art
- Occupations: Photographer, film director, music video director
- Website: www.rahirezvani.com

Rahi Rezvani (Persian: رهی رضوانی; born 1978) is an Iranian-born photographer and film director, based in Amsterdam.

== Early life and education ==
Rezvani was born and raised in Tehran. He earned a Bachelor of Fine Arts in graphic design from Tehran University of Art, and in 2008 a master's degree in photography from The Royal Academy of Art in The Hague.

== Work ==
Rezvani started working with the Netherlands Dance Theatre in 2006 for whom he has been producing all imagery and campaigns ever since. He collaborated with performance artist Marina Ambramović during the production of The Life and Death of Marina Ambramović which culminated in a solo exhibition at the Park Avenue Armory. Rezvani has also worked with Atelier Versace, creating films and books for its Haute Couture collections since the Spring/Summer 2012 season. He has photographed various artists and designers such as Donatella Versace for 1843 magazine and GQ Magazine UK, Gucci designer Alessandro Michele, Ricardo Tisci and Willem Dafoe. Dutch product designer Marcel Wanders collaborated with Rezvani for his Moooi brand presentation at Milan Furniture Fair in 2015.

Rezvani captured the imagery and portraiture for the Royal Ballet Flanders's 2018 reincarnation of Claude Debussy’s Pelléas et Mélisande by Damien Jalet and Sidi Larbi Cherkaoui—the production included sets by Abramović and costumes by Iris van Herpen. Rezvani also documented the SLEEP performance series by composer Max Richter.

Collaborating with the British band Editors, Rezvani conceived and directed the music videos for their 2015 singles "No Harm", "Marching Orders", and "Life Is A Fear" as well as art directing the covers for both singles. Rezvani won the Best Art Vinyl award for Editors' 2018 album Violence.
