= Surface, Echo & Sound =

2026 studio album by Editors

Studio album by Editors
- Released: 30 October 2026
- Recorded: 2025
- Studio: Unit 3 (London)
- Length: 44:34
- Label: PIAS
- Producer: Editors

Editors chronology
EBM (2022)	Surface, Echo & Sound (2026)

Singles from Surface, Echo & Sound
- 1. "Call It In" Released: 28 April 2026; 2. "The Rush" Released: 23 June 2026; 3. "Seriously" Released: 15 September 2026

Surface, Echo & Sound is the eighth studio album by the British band Editors. It was released on 30 October 2026 by PIAS Recordings.

The album is Editors' first since the departure of Ben Power, who largely wrote the 2022 album EBM. While previous albums used electronic instruments such as drum machines, Surface, Echo & Sound reverts to drums and guitars, with most tracks using acoustic guitars and mandolin. Similar to Editors' first songs, it was written in practice rooms rather than in recording studios.

== Composition ==
Editors' three albums before Surface, Echo & Sound used electronic elements and drum machines; 2022 album EBM was largely written by Ben Power, who then departed; for Surface, Echo & Sound, the band reverted to using drums and guitars. After frontman Tom Smith's debut album in 2025, Editors reunited. While the band's recent albums were written in recording studios, Smith brought new music for the band to work on at an industrial estate in Gloucestershire, similar to their earliest collaborations in practice rooms.

Smith wanted to make a "widescreen rock" album with acoustic guitars, naming the influences as rock bands from the mid-1980s to mid-1990s, chiefly American but also British acts such as Echo & the Bunnymen. He said that "Call It In" is about calling out for help over existential dread, and "The Rush" is about two people at a bar talking about their lives. The latter song features Smith on mandolin; guitarist Justin Lockey said that most rhythms on the album came from mandolin and acoustic guitar. "Seriously" is about navigating issues in life; Smith said that although critics considered the band to be bleak, fans admired their optimism. Smith wrote the song "Much Love" after the 2009 album In This Light and on This Evening, but did not find that it matched with other albums until Surface, Echo & Sound.

== Promotion ==
On 28 April 2026, Editors released the single "Call It In" and announced a British and European tour for the first three months of 2027. This was followed on 23 June with second single "The Rush", and the announcement of the album. On 15 September, third single "Seriously" was released.

== Critical reception ==
Professional ratings
Review scores
Source	Rating
AllMusic	4/5 stars
The Irish Times	3/5 stars
Riff	8/10
Stereoboard	3/5 stars
Under the Radar	7/10 stars

Ellie Roberts of The Arts Desk considered that Editors had gone from the electronic sound of EBM to "almost retired dad musings", and found the music to be too slow and the lyrics too simple. In The Irish Times, Ed Power wrote that Editors had returned to "landfill indie" after a career of evolution that had resulted in EBM, which he considered their best work. Roman Gokhman of Riff noted influences from 1980s new wave and jangle rock and recommended the album to fans of Editors' 2005 debut The Back Room. The review in Under the Radar considered that Editors had moved from a "gloomy but edgy" sound to a "friendly" one similar to Coldplay, U2 and Snow Patrol.

== Track listing ==
All music is composed by Editors, except where noted.

Surface, Echo & Sound track listing
No.	Title	Writer(s)	Length
1.	"Surface, Echo & Sound"		2:16
2.	"Call It In"		3:34
3.	"The Rush"	Editors, Iain Archer	3:36
4.	"Rescue"		4:39
5.	"Shadow"		5:36
6.	"Real"		4:19
7.	"Happiness"		4:24
8.	"Much Love"		4:18
9.	"Butterfly Wings"		3:42
10.	"Seriously"	Editors, Andy Burrows	4:10
11.	"The Hills We Died Upon"		4:00
Total length:			44:34

== Personnel ==
Credits are adapted from Tidal.

Editors

- Tom Smith – lead vocals, guitar, mandolin
- Justin Lockey – guitar
- Russell Leetch – bass guitar
- Ed Lay – drums
- Elliott Williams – guitar, keyboards

Additional musicians

- Iain Archer – music on track 3
- Andy Burrows – music on track 10

Technical

- Editors – production
- Craig Silvey – mixing
- Matt Colton – mastering
- Justin Lockey – engineering
- Alf McMorrow – engineering assistance

== Charts ==
Chart performance for Surface, Echo & Sound
Chart (2026)	Peak position
Austrian Albums (Ö3 Austria)	19
Belgian Albums (Ultratop Flanders)	1
Belgian Albums (Ultratop Wallonia)	6
Croatian International Albums (HDU)	7
Dutch Albums (Album Top 100)	5
French Albums (SNEP)	110
French Rock & Metal Albums (SNEP)	7
German Albums (Offizielle Top 100)	7
German Rock & Metal Albums (Offizielle Top 100)	3
Irish Independent Albums (IRMA)	22
Italian Albums (FIMI)	75
Polish Albums (ZPAV)	37
Scottish Albums (Official Charts)	5
Swiss Albums (Schweizer Hitparade)	7
UK Albums (Official Charts)	7
UK Independent Albums (Official Charts)	3
