= No Sound but the Wind =

Single by Editors

from the album The Twilight Saga: New Moon (soundtrack), In This Light and on This Evening and Violence
- Released: 26 July 2010
- Recorded: 2009
- Genre: Post-punk revival
- Length: 3:49
- Label: Kitchenware, BMG
- Songwriter(s): Edward Lay, Russell Leetch, Tom Smith, Chris Urbanowicz
- Producer(s): Alexandra Patsavas

Editors singles chronology
"Eat Raw Meat = Blood Drool" (2010)	"No Sound but the Wind" (2010)	"A Ton of Love" (2013)

"No Sound but the Wind" is a song by British indie rock band Editors, and is featured on The Twilight Saga: New Moon soundtrack. The song was first played at the Glastonbury festival 2008 and has gone through many changes; a demo version put on the Twilight soundtrack features different lyrics than the definitive version.

Tom Smith has revealed that he was inspired to write the song after reading Cormac McCarthy's novel The Road and the song has soon become established as part of Editors' live shows and a fan favourite.

The song was released as a single in 2010. The single version of the song was a live performance from the Belgian festival Rock Werchter and it managed to climb to number 1 in Belgium, making it Editors' second chart-topping hit in Belgium (the first being "Papillon"). On 18 December 2010, the single received golden record-status after a live concert at Het Glazen Huis in Antwerp from Studio Brussels. The song was later certified platinum by the Belgian Entertainment Association.

A different full band version appears on their compilation of B-sides and rarities You Are Fading I-IV as a part of Unedited box set. Another piano version was released on the album Violence.

The music video for the song is the live performance from Rock Werchter 2010. Despite the single's success in Belgium, it was not released or made available in the United Kingdom.

== Charts ==
Chart (2010)	Peak position
Dutch Top 40	72
Belgian Ultratop 50	1

== Certifications ==
Certifications for "No Sound but the Wind"
Region	Certification	Certified units/sales
Belgium (BEA)	Platinum	30,000^{*}
^{*} Sales figures based on certification alone.
