= Last Day (song) =

Single by Editors
- Released: 17 April 2010
- Recorded: 2009
- Genre: Post-punk revival, synthpop, alternative dance
- Length: 3:13
- Label: PIAS Recordings
- Songwriter(s): Edward Lay, Russell Leetch, Tom Smith, Chris Urbanowicz
- Producer(s): Flood

Editors singles chronology
"You Don't Know Love" (2010)	"Last Day" (2010)	"Eat Raw Meat = Blood Drool" (2010)

"Last Day" is a limited release single by the indie rock band Editors. It was released on vinyl as part of Record Store Day on Saturday 17 April 2010, and is limited to 1000 copies.

A video was released to coincide with the Record Store Day on 17 April 2010. The video primarily features the band rehearsals from the March/April shows and also shows some concert footage.

The b-side is an acoustic version of the song "Papillon" played live at Studio Brussel.

== Track listing ==
1. "Last Day" - 3:13
2. "Papillon (acoustic)" - 3:04

== Charts ==
Chart (2010)	Peak position
French Singles Chart	79
