= Radio 1's Live Lounge – Volume 2 =

Radio 1's Live Lounge: 2

Compilation album by Various Artists
- Released: 22 October 2007
- Genre: Various genres
- Label: Sony Music Entertainment
- Producer: Various producers

Live Lounge chronology
Radio 1's Live Lounge (2006)	Radio 1's Live Lounge - Volume 2 (2007)	Radio 1's Live Lounge - Volume 3 (2008)

Radio 1's Live Lounge: Volume 2 is a collection of live tracks played on Jo Whiley's Radio 1 show. The album is the second in a series of Live Lounge albums. It consists of both covers and the bands' own songs. The album was released on 22 October 2007.

== Track listing ==
=== Disc 1 ===
1. Foo Fighters - "Times Like These"
2. Amy Winehouse - "Valerie" (originally by The Zutons)
3. Biffy Clyro - "Umbrella" (originally by Rihanna)
4. Nelly Furtado - "Maneater"
5. The Fratellis - "Chelsea Dagger"
6. KT Tunstall - "The Prayer" (originally by Bloc Party)
7. Mark Ronson feat. Daniel Merriweather - "Stop Me" (originally by The Smiths)
8. Klaxons - "Golden Skans"
9. Bloc Party - "Say It Right" (originally by Nelly Furtado)
10. Kings of Leon - "Fans"
11. Editors - "An End Has A Start"
12. Reverend and the Makers - "Heavyweight Champion of the World"
13. José González - "Heartbeats" (originally by The Knife)
14. Calvin Harris - "The Girls"
15. The Holloways - "Generator"
16. The Pigeon Detectives - "Girlfriend" (originally by Avril Lavigne)
17. Avril Lavigne - "The Scientist" (originally by Coldplay)
18. The Gossip - "Standing in the Way of Control"
19. Paolo Nutini - "Rehab" (originally by Amy Winehouse)
20. Robyn - "With Every Heartbeat"

=== Disc 2 ===
1. Arctic Monkeys - "You Know I'm No Good" (originally by Amy Winehouse)
2. Mika - "Grace Kelly"
3. James Morrison - "You Give Me Something"
4. Thirty Seconds to Mars - "Stronger" (originally by Kanye West)
5. Keane - "Dirrtylicious" (originally by Christina Aguilera/Destiny's Child)
6. Corinne Bailey Rae - "SexyBack" (originally by Justin Timberlake)
7. Jack Peñate - "Second, Minute or Hour"
8. The Fray - "Hips Don't Lie" (originally by Shakira)
9. Maroon 5 - "Makes Me Wonder"
10. The View - "Same Jeans"
11. The Enemy - "Hung Up" (originally by Madonna)
12. Kasabian - "Empire"
13. The Zutons - "Valerie"
14. Damien Rice - "Cannonball"
15. Maxïmo Park - "I'm Gonna Be (500 Miles)" (originally by The Proclaimers)
16. Dizzee Rascal - "Fix Up, Look Sharp"
17. The Streets - "Never Went to Church"
18. Elbow - "Forget Myself"
19. Natasha Bedingfield - "Chasing Cars" (originally by Snow Patrol)
20. Coldplay - "Yellow"

== See also ==
- Live Lounge
- Radio 1's Live Lounge
- Radio 1's Live Lounge – Volume 3
- Radio 1's Live Lounge – Volume 4
- Radio 1's Live Lounge - Volume 5
- Radio 1: Established 1967
