= The Racing Rats =

Single by Editors

from the album An End Has a Start
- B-side: "Banging Heads, A Thousand Pieces"
- Released: 26 November 2007
- Recorded: 2006/2007
- Genre: Post-punk revival, indie rock
- Length: 3:50 (single edit); 4:17 (album version)
- Label: Kitchenware Records (UK); PIAS (Continental Europe)
- Songwriter(s): Editors (Edward Lay, Russell Leetch, Tom Smith, Chris Urbanowicz)
- Producer(s): Jacknife Lee

Editors singles chronology
"An End Has a Start" (2007)	"The Racing Rats" (2007)	"Push Your Head Towards the Air" (2008)

"The Racing Rats" is the third single from Editors' second album An End Has a Start. The single was released on 26 November 2007 with a CD format and three 7" singles in the UK, as well as on two CD formats and DVD on PIAS in Europe. It reached number 26 in the UK Charts, one place higher than the previous single, "An End Has a Start". It was used as the backing music, to the 2008 BAFTA Academy Fellowship Award tribute to Anthony Hopkins.

== Composition ==
"The Racing Rats" is composed in the key of E minor with a tempo of 154 beats per minute.

== Track listings ==
CD SKCD97

- Card sleeve
1. "The Racing Rats" (Radio Edit) – 3:50
2. "Banging Heads" – 3:42

Vinyl SKX972

1. "The Racing Rats" (Original Demo)
2. "A Thousand Pieces" – 3:42

Limited Vinyl 1 SKX97

- Transparent red vinyl
1. "The Racing Rats" (Live from Wolverhampton Civic Hall)
2. "Smokers Outside the Hospital Doors" (Live Demo)

Limited Vinyl 2 SKX973

1. "Escape the Nest" (Demo)
2. "When Anger Shows" (Demo)

Note: 1000 numbered vinyl copies

CD1 (PIAS European Release)

- 4 panel digipack
1. "The Racing Rats" (Radio Edit) – 3:48
2. "When Anger Shows" (Live) – 5:52
3. "Lights" (Live) – 2:43
4. "Smokers Outside the Hospital Doors" (Live) – 5:02

CD2 (PIAS European Release)

- Card sleeve
1. "The Racing Rats" (Live) – 4:14
2. "The Weight of the World" (Live) – 4:16
3. "Fingers in the Factories" (Live) – 4:43
4. "An End Has a Start " (Live) – 3:52

DVD (PIAS European Release)

- Card sleeve
1. "The Racing Rats" (video)
2. "Smokers Outside the Hospital Doors" (VPRO Session @ Lowlands)
3. "An End Has a Start" (video)

CD3 (PIAS European Release)

- Slimline jewel case
1. "The Racing Rats" (Radio Edit)
2. "The Racing Rats" (Live)
3. "Banging Heads"
4. "A Thousand Pieces"

Promo:

- Card sleeve
1. "The Racing Rats" (Radio Edit) – 3:50
2. "The Racing Rats" (Full version) – 4:15
3. "The Racing Rats" (Instrumental) – 4:16

== Music video ==
The music video for "The Racing Rats" features the band performing in a rural suburb in slow motion, much like the video for the band's other single "Bullets". Tom notices a little girl who is drawing a big circle on the pavement. Near the end of the video a solar eclipse occurs directly parallel to the girl's circle causing it to light up spectacularly as the band and other citizens look on in awe. At the end of the video the town is empty of life, suggesting the eclipse consumed all the townspeople.

The relevance the video has to the song is from the lyrics "Slow down little one, you can't keep running away / You mustn't go outside yet, it's not your time to play / Standing at the edge of your town with the skyline in your eyes / Reaching up to God, the sun says its goodbyes".

== Charts ==
Chart performance for "The Racing Rats"
Chart (2007)	Peak position
Belgium (Ultratop 50 Flanders)	36
Belgium (Ultratip Bubbling Under Wallonia)	12
Netherlands (Dutch Top 40)	12
Netherlands (Single Top 100)	20
UK Singles (OCC)	26
