= Radio 1's Live Lounge – Volume 3 =

Compilation album by Various
- Released: 20 October 2008
- Genre: Various
- Length: 67:42
- Label: Sony Music Entertainment
- Producer: Various

Live Lounge chronology
Radio 1's Live Lounge - Volume 2 (2007)	Radio 1's Live Lounge - Volume 3 (2008)	Radio 1's Live Lounge – Volume 4 (2009)

Radio 1's Live Lounge – Volume 3 is a collection of live tracks played on Jo Whiley's Radio 1 show. The album is the third in a series of Live Lounge albums. It consists of both covers and the bands' own songs. The album was released on 20 October 2008.

== Track listing ==
=== Disc 1 ===
1. Duffy - "Mercy"
2. The Ting Tings - "Standing in the Way of Control" (originally by Gossip)
3. Dizzee Rascal - "That's Not My Name" (originally by The Ting Tings)
4. Sam Sparro - "American Boy" (originally by Estelle)
5. Pendulum - "Violet Hill" (originally by Coldplay)
6. The Streets - "Blinded by the Lights"
7. McFly - "I Kissed a Girl" (originally by Katy Perry)
8. The Kooks - "Shine On"
9. Newton Faulkner - "Foundations" (originally by Kate Nash)
10. Panic! At The Disco - "Nine in the Afternoon"
11. Girls Aloud - "With Every Heartbeat" (originally by Robyn and Kleerup)
12. The Feeling - "Work" (originally by Kelly Rowland)
13. The Hoosiers - "LoveStoned" (originally by Justin Timberlake)
14. The Wombats - "Moving to New York"
15. Paramore - "Love's Not a Competition (But I'm Winning)" (originally by Kaiser Chiefs)
16. Elliot Minor - "Rule the World" (originally by Take That)
17. Ida Maria - "Sweet About Me" (originally by Gabriella Cilmi)
18. R.E.M. - "Munich" (originally by Editors)
19. Glasvegas - "Daddy's Gone"
20. Foo Fighters - "Keep the Car Running" (originally by Arcade Fire)

=== Disc 2 ===
1. The Automatic - "Love in This Club" (originally by Usher)
2. Adele - "Chasing Pavements"
3. Elbow - "One Day Like This"
4. Scouting For Girls - "Elvis Ain't Dead"
5. Guillemots - "Black and Gold" (originally by Sam Sparro)
6. Lupe Fiasco - "Superstar"
7. DJ Ironik - "Stay with Me"
8. Kate Nash - "Fluorescent Adolescent" (originally by Arctic Monkeys)
9. Goldfrapp - "It's Not Over Yet" (originally by Grace, covered recently by Klaxons)
10. The Pigeon Detectives - "Ready for the Floor" (originally by Hot Chip)
11. Kasabian - "L.S.F."
12. Athlete - "Wires"
13. The Zutons - "Beautiful" (originally by Christina Aguilera)
14. The Script - "Lose Yourself" (originally by Eminem
15. Santogold - "Hometown Glory" (originally by Adele)
16. Alphabeat - "10,000 Nights"
17. Bat For Lashes - "Sweet Dreams (Are Made of This)" (originally by Eurythmics)
18. Ne-Yo - "Closer"
19. Rihanna - "Hate That I Love You"
20. Estelle - "American Boy"

== See also ==
- Live Lounge
- Radio 1's Live Lounge
- Radio 1's Live Lounge - Volume 2
- Radio 1's Live Lounge – Volume 4
- Radio 1's Live Lounge – Volume 5
- Radio 1: Established 1967
