= Radio 1's Live Lounge =

Compilation album by Various
- Released: 16 October 2006
- Genre: Various
- Length: 145:42
- Label: Sony
- Producer: Various

Live Lounge chronology
Radio 1's Live Lounge (2006)	Radio 1's Live Lounge – Volume 2 (2007)

Radio 1's Live Lounge is a collection of live tracks played on Jo Whiley's Radio 1 show. It consists of both covers and the bands' own songs. Originally, it was scheduled for release in May 2006, but later changed to be released on 16 October 2006. The album has sold 935,687 copies as of October 2014.

== Track listing ==
=== Disc 1 ===
1. Foo Fighters – "DOA"
2. Arctic Monkeys – "Love Machine" (originally by Girls Aloud)
3. Snow Patrol – "Run"
4. The Kooks – "Crazy" (originally by Gnarls Barkley)
5. Razorlight – "Golden Touch"
6. Corinne Bailey Rae – "Munich" (originally by Editors)
7. The Automatic – "Gold Digger" (originally by Kanye West feat. Jamie Foxx)
8. Editors – "All Sparks"
9. Boy Kill Boy – "Maneater" (originally by Nelly Furtado)
10. Queens of the Stone Age – "No One Knows"
11. Embrace – "How Come" (originally by D12)
12. James Blunt – "If There's Any Justice" (originally by Lemar)
13. Natasha Bedingfield – "The Scientist" (originally by Coldplay)
14. Kings of Leon – "Molly's Chambers"
15. Jamie Cullum – "Frontin'" (originally by Pharrell)
16. Sugababes – "Living for the Weekend" (originally by HARD-Fi)
17. Lemar – "I Believe in a Thing Called Love" (originally by The Darkness)
18. Will Young – "Hey Ya!" (originally by OutKast)
19. Hard-Fi – "Tied Up Too Tight"
20. Oasis – "Songbird"

=== Disc 2 ===
1. Coldplay – "The Scientist"
2. Lily Allen – "Smile"
3. Keane – "With or Without You" (originally by U2)
4. KT Tunstall – "Other Side of the World"
5. Franz Ferdinand – "What You Waiting For?" (originally by Gwen Stefani)
6. Pink – "Family Portrait"
7. OutKast – "Ms. Jackson"
8. The Futureheads – "Hounds of Love" (originally by Kate Bush)
9. Jamelia – "Numb" (originally by Linkin Park)
10. Dizzee Rascal – "Jus' a Rascal"
11. Lemon Jelly – "Nice Weather for Ducks"
12. Mylo – "In My Arms"
13. My Chemical Romance – "Song 2" (originally by Blur)
14. The Coral – "Dreaming of You"
15. Maxïmo Park – "Going Missing"
16. The Bravery – "An Honest Mistake"
17. The Streets – "Let's Push Things Forward"
18. Basement Jaxx – "Romeo"
19. Orson – "Push the Button" (originally by Sugababes)
20. 50 Cent – "In Da Club"

== See also ==
- Live Lounge
- Radio 1's Live Lounge – Volume 2
- Radio 1's Live Lounge – Volume 3
- Radio 1's Live Lounge – Volume 4
- Radio 1's Live Lounge – Volume 5
- Radio 1 Established 1967
