= Push Your Head Towards the Air =

Single by Editors

from the album An End Has a Start
- Released: 3 March 2008
- Recorded: 2007/2008
- Genre: Post-punk revival, indie rock
- Label: Kitchenware Records (UK); PIAS (Continental Europe)
- Songwriters: Editors (Edward Lay, Russell Leetch, Tom Smith, Chris Urbanowicz)

Editors singles chronology
"The Racing Rats" (2007)	"Push Your Head Towards the Air" (2008)	"Bones" (2008)

"Push Your Head Towards the Air" is the fourth single from An End Has A Start, the second album by Editors. It was released on 3 March 2008 and featured a new mix of the album track. All 3 formats of the UK edition of the single were limited to 500 copies each, all of which sold out through internet pre-orders before the release date.

== Charting ==
"Push Your Head Towards the Air" failed to chart as it was ineligible according to UK chart rules. The inclusion of stickers with each format has been cited as the reason for disqualification.

== Video ==
The video for "Push Your Head Towards the Air" was directed by Paul Minor from Streetgang Films. It is shot in black in white and shows footage of the band performing in a dark room intercut with super slow-motion footage of a group of people fighting against a white backdrop.

== Track listings ==
CD (Limited to 500 copies)

1. Push Your Head Towards the Air (Radio Edit)
2. Lullaby (The Cure cover)

Vinyl (Numbered and limited to 500 copies)

1. Push Your Head Towards the Air (Radio Edit)
2. Spiders (Live At BBC Electric Proms)

Maxi CD (Limited to 500 copies)

1. Push Your Head Towards the Air
2. The Weight of the World (Live at BBC Electric Proms)
3. When Anger Shows (Live at BBC Electric Proms)
4. Well Worn Hand (Live at BBC Electric Proms)

Maxi CD (PIAS European Release)

- Slimline jewel case
1. Push Your Head Towards the Air (Radio Edit)
2. The Weight of the World (Live at BBC Electric Proms)
3. When Anger Shows (Live at BBC Electric Proms)
4. Well Worn Hand (Live at BBC Electric Proms)
5. Lullaby (The Cure cover)

Vinyl (PIAS European Release)

1. Push Your Head Towards the Air (Radio Edit)
2. Spiders (Live at BBC Electric Proms)

Promo

1. Push Your Head Towards the Air (Radio Edit)
2. Push Your Head Towards the Air (Full)
3. Push Your Head Towards the Air (Instrumental - Edit)
