= Blood (Editors song) =

2005 single by Editors

Single by Editors

from the album The Back Room
- Released: 11 July 2005
- Length: 3:29
- Label: Kitchenware, BMG
- Songwriter(s): Edward Lay, Russell Leetch, Tom Smith, Chris Urbanowicz
- Producer(s): Jim Abbiss

Editors singles chronology
"Munich" (2005)	"Blood" (2005)	"All Sparks" (2006)

"Blood" is a song by British post-punk revival band Editors from their 2005 debut album, The Back Room. It was released 11 July 2005 as the third single from the album and was re-released on 19 June 2006. It was in very limited release with the CD limited to 5000 copies whilst the 10-inch single was deleted on day of release and was only available through pre-ordering. Over the two formats, they contain two cover songs (originally by Talking Heads and R.E.M.) and two remixes of The Back Room track "Camera" from Jason Spaceman and Paul Oakenfold.

== Track listings ==
- 7-inch (SKX79)
1. "Blood"
2. "Forest Fire"
- CD (SKCD792)
1. "Blood"
2. "Let Your Good Heart Lead You Home"
- Maxi-CD (SKCD79)
1. "Blood"
2. "Heads in Bags"
3. "Blood" (The Freelance Hellraiser editorial)

"Blood (re-issue)"

Single by Editors

from the album The Back Room
- Released: 19 June 2006
- Length: 3:29
- Label: Kitchenware, BMG
- Songwriter(s): Edward Lay, Russell Leetch, Tom Smith, Chris Urbanowicz
- Producer(s): Jim Abbiss

Editors singles chronology
"All Sparks" (2006)	"Blood (re-issue)" (2006)	"Smokers Outside The Hospital Doors" (2007)

== Re-issue ==
- 10-inch (SKX87)
1. "Blood"
2. "Road to Nowhere" (Napster Session)
3. "Camera" (obscured by J Spaceman)
- CD (SKCD87)
1. "Blood"
2. "Orange Crush" (R.E.M. cover)
3. "Camera" (Oakenfold Remix)
4. "Blood" (video)
