= All Sparks =

2006 single by Editors

Single by Editors

from the album The Back Room
- Released: 27 March 2006
- Length: 3:33
- Label: Kitchenware, BMG
- Songwriter(s): Edward Lay, Russell Leetch, Tom Smith, Chris Urbanowicz
- Producer(s): Jim Abbiss

Editors singles chronology
"Munich" (2006)	"All Sparks" (2006)	"Smokers Outside the Hospital Doors" (2007)

"All Sparks" is a song by British post-punk revival band Editors from their 2005 debut album, The Back Room. It was released 27 March 2006 as the fourth single from the album.

An acoustic version of the song features on the Radio 1's Live Lounge album. The song was also used as the closing theme to the first season of the ITV1 show Primeval.

== Track listings ==
- 7-inch (SKX84)
1. "All Sparks"
2. "Someone Says" (acoustic)
- CD (SKCD84)
1. "All Sparks"
2. "The Diplomat"
- Maxi-CD (SKCD842)
1. "All Sparks"
2. "From the Outside"
3. "All Sparks" (Cicada remix)
4. "All Sparks" (video)
- European Pias CD EP (449.3022.021)
1. "All Sparks"
2. "Come Share the View"
3. "Find Yourself a Safe Place"
4. "Time to Slow Down"
5. "French Disko"
