= You Don't Know Love =

You Don't Know Love my refer to:

- "You Don't Know Love" (Editors song)
- "You Don't Know Love" (Janie Fricke song)
- "You Don't Know Love" (Olly Murs song)
