= An End Has a Start =

Studio album by Editors
- Released: 25 June 2007
- Recorded: 2006–2007
- Studio: Grouse Lodge Studios, Rosemount, County Westmeath, Ireland; Air Studios, London; The Garage, Kent; Miloco Studios, London
- Genre: Indie rock, post-punk revival
- Length: 44:40
- Label: Kitchenware
- Producer: Jacknife Lee

Editors chronology
The Back Room (2005)	An End Has a Start (2007)	In This Light and on This Evening (2009)

Singles from An End Has a Start
- 1. "Smokers Outside the Hospital Doors" Released: 18 June 2007; 2. "An End Has a Start" Released: 3 September 2007; 3. "The Racing Rats" Released: 26 November 2007; 4. "Push Your Head Towards the Air" Released: 3 March 2008; 5. "Bones" Released: 2 June 2008

An End Has a Start is the second album by British indie rock band Editors. It was released on 25 June 2007 in the UK and on 17 July 2007 in the US. The album was certified Platinum in the UK on the same day it was released. An End Has a Start was the 69th best-selling album in the UK end of year album chart in 2007.

== Reception ==
Professional ratings
Aggregate scores
Source	Rating
Metacritic	65/100
Review scores
Source	Rating
AllMusic	3.5/5 stars
The A.V. Club	B+
Drowned in Sound	8/10
The Guardian	4/5 stars
NME	6/10
The Observer	3/5 stars
Pitchfork	4.9/10
Rolling Stone	2.5/5 stars
The Times	3/5 stars
Uncut	4/5 stars

An End Has a Start was met with mostly positive reviews, reaching a Metacritic score of 65 based on 24 reviews. Drowned in Sound wrote: "An End Has a Start actually sounds like it was crafted as ten quite individual chapters of a long-running saga; surprisingly, though, it ultimately works better than its predecessor as a cohesive, flowing album", with a score 8 of 10. The Guardian wrote that "singer Tom Smith tempers his constant anxiety with flashes of optimism, his brittle nihilism with gooey sentiment" (8/10). NME opined that "An End Has a Start turns out to be a pupae album—its Editors stretching their sonic muscles, poking the first spindles of whatever new form they'll take out of their gloom-rock cocoon come album three", giving the album 6 of 10. Pitchfork felt that "It's a shame that premature commercial success has sullied Editors' creativity, because An End contains its share of bright spots", giving the album 4.9 of 10. Stylus Magazine said that it is "A record that's so deathly serious that each of its ten songs could be associated with its very own biblical plague."

== Track listing ==
All tracks written by Tom Smith, Chris Urbanowicz, Russell Leetch & Edward Lay.

No.	Title	Length
1.	"Smokers Outside the Hospital Doors"	4:57
2.	"An End Has a Start"	3:45
3.	"The Weight of the World"	4:18
4.	"Bones"	4:06
5.	"When Anger Shows"	5:45
6.	"The Racing Rats"	4:17
7.	"Push Your Head Towards the Air"	5:44
8.	"Escape the Nest"	4:43
9.	"Spiders"	4:00
10.	"Well Worn Hand"	2:54

iTunes additional track
No.	Title	Length
11.	"A Thousand Pieces"	3:41

Japan edition bonus tracks
No.	Title	Length
11.	"A Thousand Pieces"	3:41
12.	"Open Up"	3:40

=== B-Sides and Rarities ===
US reissue bonus EP
No.	Title	Length
1.	"Smokers Outside the Hospital Doors" (demo)	3:18
2.	"Banging Heads"	3:42
3.	"A Thousand Pieces"	3:41
4.	"The Racing Rats" (live)	4:20
5.	"Open Up"	3:40

== Trivia ==
- German band In Extremo covered the track "An End Has a Start" on their 2008 album Sängerkrieg.

== Personnel ==
Editors

- Tom Smith – lead vocals, guitar, piano
- Russell Leetch – bass guitar, synthesizer, backing vocals
- Ed Lay – drums, percussion, backing vocals
- Chris Urbanowicz – lead guitar, synthesizer

Additional musicians

- Edith Bowman – performer
- Robert Whitaker – performer
- James Banbury – cello, string arrangements
- Alison Dodds – violin
- Fiona McCapra – violin
- Anne Struther – choir, chorus
- Garret Lee – choir, chorus, performer

Technical personnel

- Jacknife Lee – programming, production, engineering, mixing
- Sam Bell – programming, engineering, performer
- Dani Castelar – performer, assistant engineer
- Jon Gray – engineering, performer
- Tom McFall – choir, chorus, engineering
- Neil Comber – mixing assistant
- Pete Hofmann – engineering
- Cenzo Townshend – mixing
- Idris Khan – images, cover art

== Charts ==
=== Weekly charts ===
Chart (2007)	Peak position
Australian Albums (ARIA)	37
Belgian Albums (Ultratop Flanders)	5
Belgian Albums (Ultratop Wallonia)	45
Dutch Albums (Album Top 100)	2
Finnish Albums (Suomen virallinen lista)	24
German Albums (Offizielle Top 100)	24
French Albums (SNEP)	56
Irish Albums (IRMA)	7
Italian Albums (FIMI)	47
New Zealand Albums (RMNZ)	37
Portuguese Albums (AFP)	21
Swiss Albums (Schweizer Hitparade)	31
UK Albums (OCC)	1
US Billboard 200	117
US Independent Albums (Billboard)	14

=== Year-end charts ===
Chart (2007)	Position
Belgian Albums (Ultratop Flanders)	46
Dutch Albums (Album Top 100)	62
UK Albums (OCC)	69

Chart (2008)	Position
UK Albums (OCC)	190

== Certifications and sales ==
Region	Certification	Certified units/sales
Belgium (BRMA)	Gold	15,000^{*}
Ireland (IRMA)	Gold	7,500^{^}
United Kingdom (BPI)	Platinum	335,000
United States	—	48,000
^{*} Sales figures based on certification alone.^{^} Shipments figures based on certification alone.
