= Bullets (Editors song) =

2005 single by Editors

"Bullets (Original Release)"

Single by Editors

from the album The Back Room
- Released: 24 January 2005
- Length: 3:09
- Label: Kitchenware
- Songwriters: Edward Lay, Russell Leetch, Tom Smith, Chris Urbanowicz
- Producer: Gavin Monaghan

Editors singles chronology
"Bullets (Original Release)" (2005)	"Munich" (2005)

"Bullets"

Single by Editors

from the album The Back Room
- Released: 26 September 2005
- Length: 3:11
- Label: Kitchenware, BMG
- Songwriters: Edward Lay, Russell Leetch, Tom Smith, Chris Urbanowicz
- Producers: Jim Abbiss, Jacknife Lee

Editors singles chronology
"Blood" (2005)	"Bullets" (2005)	"Munich" (2006)

"Bullets" is the debut single by British post-punk revival band Editors, originally released 24 January 2005. It is from their 2005 debut album, The Back Room. The single was mixed by Cenzo Townshend and the video made for the song was directed by Mike Brady. Both editions of the original single were limited to 500 copies. It was then re-released on 26 September 2005 as the fourth single from the album. A new single version was re-recorded and produced by Jacknife Lee and a second video was made for the song, directed by Martin de Thurah.

The song was described by Asha Mehta of the BBC as "a hypnotic, art-punk anthem", and by the band as their nearest thing to a love song, and it was the Single of the Week on Zane Lowe's BBC Radio 1 show. The initial release reached number 54 on the UK Singles Chart, and the re-release number 27.

== Track listings ==
- 7-inch (SKX77)
1. "Bullets"
2. "You Are Fading"
- CD (SKCD77)
1. "Bullets"
2. "You Are Fading"
3. "Dust in the Sunlight"

== Track listings (re-issue) ==
- 7-inch (SKX80)
1. "Bullets" (Jack Knife Lee Remix)
2. "Time to Slow Down"
- CD (SKCD802)
1. "Bullets" (Jack Knife Lee Remix)
2. "Come Share the View"
- Maxi-CD (SKCD80)
1. "Bullets" (Jack Knife Lee Remix)
2. "I Buried the Devil"
3. "Blood" (alternative version)
4. "Bullets" (new video)
