= Radio 1's Live Lounge – Volume 5 =

Radio 1's Live Lounge: 5

Compilation album by Various
- Released: 25 October 2010
- Genre: Various
- Label: Sony Music Entertainment
- Producer: Various

Live Lounge chronology
Radio 1's Live Lounge – Volume 4 (2009)	Radio 1's Live Lounge – Volume 5 (2010)	BBC Radio 1's Live Lounge - The Best Of (2011)

Radio 1's Live Lounge – Volume 5 is a collection of live tracks played on Fearne Cotton's and Jo Whiley's Radio 1 shows. The album is the fifth in a series of Live Lounge albums. It consists of both covers and the bands' own songs. The album was released on 25 October 2010.

== Track listing ==
Disc 1
No.	Title	Artist	Length
1.	"Pass Out" (Originally by Tinie Tempah)	Plan B	4:49
2.	"Wonderful Life" (Originally by Hurts)	Kylie Minogue	3:23
3.	"Frisky"	Tinie Tempah	4:14
4.	"Teenage Dream" (Originally by Katy Perry)	Example	3:54
5.	"The Cave"	Mumford & Sons	3:30
6.	"The Man Who Can't Be Moved / Breakeven" (Originally by The Script)	N-Dubz	2:48
7.	"Ego"	The Saturdays	3:14
8.	"When Love Takes Over" (Originally by David Guetta)	Pixie Lott	3:22
9.	"Billionaire" (Originally by Travie McCoy)	Professor Green	3:38
10.	"All the Lovers" (Originally by Kylie Minogue)	Scissor Sisters	3:25
11.	"Acapella"	Kelis	3:53
12.	"Sweet Dreams" (Originally by Beyoncé)	The Big Pink	4:05
13.	"New York"	Paloma Faith	3:19
14.	"Starstrukk" (Originally by 3OH!3)	Marina and the Diamonds	4:16
15.	"Hollywood" (Originally by Marina and the Diamonds)	Kids in Glass Houses	3:13
16.	"Sweet Disposition"	The Temper Trap	3:56
17.	"In for the Kill" (Originally by La Roux)	Miike Snow	5:49
18.	"Starry Eyed" (Originally by Ellie Goulding)	You Me At Six	2:27
19.	"Dynamite" (Originally by Taio Cruz)	McFly	3:57

Disc 2
No.	Title	Artist	Length
1.	"My Hero"	Dave Grohl	3:46
2.	"Little Lion Man" (Originally by Mumford & Sons)	Taio Cruz	3:02
3.	"She Said" (Originally by Plan B)	Jason Derulo	3:26
4.	"Billionaire"	Travie McCoy	3:34
5.	"Many of Horror"	Biffy Clyro	4:00
6.	"Bang Bang Bang"	Mark Ronson	3:55
7.	"Telephone" (Originally by Lady Gaga)	Roll Deep	4:00
8.	"Guns and Horses" (Originally by Ellie Goulding)	3OH!3	2:54
9.	"Starry Eyed"	Ellie Goulding	2:52
10.	"Better Than Love"	Hurts	3:47
11.	"Underdog" (Originally by Kasabian)	Kelly Rowland	2:46
12.	"Drummer Boy"	Alesha Dixon	3:31
13.	"Fallin'" (Originally by Alicia Keys)	Jordin Sparks	2:50
14.	"Dancing on My Own"	Robyn	4:07
15.	"I'm Not Alone" (Originally by Calvin Harris)	Chipmunk	3:56
16.	"I Gotta Feeling" (Originally by The Black Eyed Peas)	Jay Sean	2:16
17.	"Kickstarts" (Originally by Example)	Tinchy Stryder	3:27
18.	"Alejandro" (Originally by Lady Gaga)	All Time Low	3:23
19.	"Don't Stop Believin' (Glee Cast Version)" (Originally by Journey)	Scouting For Girls	3:46

== See also ==
- Live Lounge
- Radio 1's Live Lounge
- Radio 1's Live Lounge – Volume 2
- Radio 1's Live Lounge – Volume 3
- Radio 1's Live Lounge – Volume 4
- Radio 1: Established 1967
- List of Live Lounge cover versions
