= The Back Room (album) =

Studio album by Editors
- Released: 25 July 2005
- Recorded: Early 2005
- Studios: The Chapel, Lincolnshire; Mayfair, London; The Magic Garden, Wolverhampton
- Genres: Post-punk revival; gothic rock; indie pop
- Length: 43:48
- Label: Kitchenware
- Producers: Jim Abbiss, Gavin Monaghan

Editors chronology
The Back Room (2005)	An End Has a Start (2007)

Singles from The Back Room
- 1. "Bullets" Released: 24 January 2005; 2. "Munich" Released: 18 April 2005; 3. "Blood" Released: 11 July 2005; 4. "All Sparks" Released: 27 March 2006

The Back Room is the debut studio album of British rock band Editors; it was released on 25 July 2005 through Kitchenware Records. The Editors formed while attending university and later moved to Birmingham, where they played club shows and made demos. After signing to Kitchenware in late 2004, the band recorded their debut album at studios in Lincolnshire, London and Wolverhampton. Jim Abbiss produced all but one of the tracks; the exception was produced by Gavin Monaghan. The Back Room is a post-punk revival, gothic rock and indie pop album that has been compared to the works of Echo & the Bunnymen, Elbow and Interpol.

"Bullets" was released as the album's lead single in January 2005; it was followed by a tour of the UK. "Munich" and "Blood" were released as the album's second and third singles in April and June 2005, respectively. The album's release was promoted with a UK tour throughout July 2005; "Bullets" was re-released following their debut US show in September 2005. Editors then supported Franz Ferdinand on their UK tour, leading to Editors' headlining tour at the end of 2005. In early 2006, "Munich" was re-released; they promoted it with tours in the US and the UK. The album's fourth single "All Sparks" was released in March 2006; it was followed by a co-headlining US tour with Stellastarr. Following a short UK tour, "Blood" was re-released in June 2006, and was promoted with another US tour.

The Back Room received generally positive reviews from music critics; opinions on the Editors' influences and the lyrics were divided but frontman Tom Smith's vocals were well-received. The album reached number two in the UK and Scotland, and charted in Ireland, the Netherlands and the United States. All of the album's singles performed well in the UK: "Bullets" peaked at number 27, "Munich" peaked at number 10, "Blood" peaked at number 18 and "All Sparks" peaked at number 21. The Back Room was nominated for the 2006 Mercury Prize, and was later certified platinum in the UK, and gold in Belgium, Ireland and the Netherlands. It appeared on several album of the year lists by Drowned in Sound, NME and PopMatters and others, and appeared on best of the decade lists by laut.de and OOR.

== Background and recording ==
Editors formed in 2003 during the emergence of the post-punk revival under than name Snowfield; the band consisted of Tom Smith on vocals and guitar, Chris Urbanowicz on guitar, Russel Leetch on bass and Ed Lay on drums. The members met in 2000 at Staffordshire University and ended up living together. Urbanowicz said he had grown tired of guitar-centric music following Britpop and that the members bonded over their love of Is This It (2001) by The Strokes and Asleep in the Back (2001) by Elbow. They could all play instruments and shared similar music tastes so they decided to form a band. They were co-students on a music technology course, which allowed them to use practice rooms and recording studios. After graduating, the band members moved to Birmingham, where they earned money to pay rent and worked on the band. They performed at club shows and recorded demos, and later attracted British record labels.

Between late 2003 and mid-2004, the band played three-to-four showcases per week for interested labels. In late 2004, they signed to Kitchenware Records, which had been recently revived following a period of dormancy. After this, the band changed their name to Editors, which Smith said was "no witty comment on any kind of journalism". In early 2005, the band took a five-week break from touring to record what became their debut studio album, though Smith said it was recorded in around three and a half weeks. Most of the album was recorded at The Chapel, a studio in Lincolnshire, with producer Jim Abbiss, who handled recording alongside Ewan Davis. Loz Brazil recorded "Munich" at Mayfair Studios in London with Abbiss producing. "Bullets" was recorded at The Magic Garden in Wolverhampton with producer Gavin Monaghan. Andy Taylor served as the Pro Tools operator and engineer. Barny Barnicott mixed most of the album at The Pierce Rooms in London, while Cenzo Townshend mixed "Munich" and "Bullets" at Olympic Studios, also in London.

== Composition and lyrics ==
The sound of The Back Room has been described as post-punk revival, gothic rock and indie pop, and was compared to the work of Echo & the Bunnymen—particularly their album Heaven Up Here (1981)—Interpol and their album Antics (2004), and the works of Elbow. Urbanowicz disregarded some of these comparisons, saying Editors' material had already been written before they had "really listened to any of those bands properly". He credited Editors' choice of music to the Walkmen, to whose music they incessantly listened. Smith said, in comparison to their live setting, the album has synthesisers, which give it a dark electronic nuance. musicOMH writer David Turnbull said The Back Room is "characterised by thick, prominent basslines, insistent drums, twinkling guitar and a baritone voice". Starting with "Camera", synthesisers take a prominent role in the album's second half. Urbanowicz attributed the album's aggressive tone to when they were living together and working jobs. The title is taken from a line in "Camera"; Smith considered it the "centre piece" of the album and said while death, love and loss are recurring themes on the album, he intentionally kept the meaning of the songs ambiguous for the listener to interpret for themselves. Leech said R.E.M.'s first two albums Murmur (1983) and Reckoning (1984) were an influence on Smith's lyrical writings.

On "Lights", the album's opening track, the guitarwork switches from strummed jangling to single picked notes, which are enhanced by reverb, evoking the style of the Edge from U2. "Munich" follows the same pattern, and is backed by a drum pattern that resembles the one in "Evil" (2005) by Interpol, along with Smith and Urbanowicz's 'marching' guitars. The album's tempo slows for three of the songs, starting with "Fall". "All Sparks", the chorus of which is reminiscent of the work of Coldplay, is followed by "Camera", which evokes murder ballads of Bauhaus. Discussing the latter track, Smith said: "A photo can make any previous situation look sweeter. Everyone has a place they hide things they don't want people to see." Matthew Butler of Drowned in Sound said the song "becomes almost biblical with its enriching spirit, replete with echoing church vocals and funeral organ sounds". During the up-tempo track "Fingers in the Factories", which talks about being working class, the vocals, guitars and drums synchronise for staccato notes. "Bullets", which recalls the early work of U2, refers to periods in a person's life when situations go awry, including the aftermath of a break-up and unemployment. "Open Your Arms" evokes "40'" (2004) by Franz Ferdinand. The album closes with "Distance", an Interpol-esque track.

== Release and promotion ==
Editors' debut single "Bullets" was released on 24 January 2005, with "You Are Fading" and "Dust in the Sunlight". To promote the single, they embarked on their first UK tour the same month. In February 2005, as part of the NME Awards, the band played a one-off show at London Astoria. "Munich" was released as the second single on 18 April 2005; the seven-inch vinyl version included "Disappear" as its B-side. Two versions were released on Compact Disc (CD); the first with "Crawl Down the Wall" and "Colours", while the other includes "Release". "Blood" was released as the album's third single on 11 July 2005; the seven-inch vinyl version includes "Forest Fire" as its B-side. Two versions were released on CD: the first with "Heads in Bags" and a remix of "Blood" by the Freelance Hellraiser, and the second with "Let Your Good Heart Lead You Home".

The Back Room was released on 25 July 2005 through Kitchenware Records. Nick Southall of Stylus Magazine said its artwork is reminiscent of the cover of Turn On the Bright Lights (2002) by Interpol, "only darker, more monochrome". MTV2 was an early supporter of the band, frequently playing the music videos for "Munich" and "Blood". To promote the album, Editors toured throughout the month, following which they performed secret shows in Birmingham and London in August 2005.

Editors then played their debut show in the United States with Maxïmo Park and The Features. "Bullets" was re-released on 26 September 2005; the seven-inch vinyl version includes "Time to Slow Down". Two versions were released on CD: the first with "I Buried the Devil", an alternative version of "Blood" and the music video for "Bullets", while second includes "Come Share the View". The band performed one-off shows in London and Sheffield, and played at London Astoria on 10 October 2005. They supported Franz Ferdinand on their UK tour, then ended the year with a tour of small UK venues alongside The Kooks and Kubichek. On 2 January 2006, "Munich" was re-released; the seven-inch vinyl version includes a demo of "Camera" as its B-side. Two versions were released on CD; the first with "French Disko" and the second with "Find Yourself a Safe Place", a remix of "Munich" and the music video for it, which Mark Thomas directed. They promoted this with a short tour of the US later in the month. Following an appearance at the NME Awards, Editors went on another UK tour in February and March 2006. On 21 March 2006, The Back Room was released in the US.

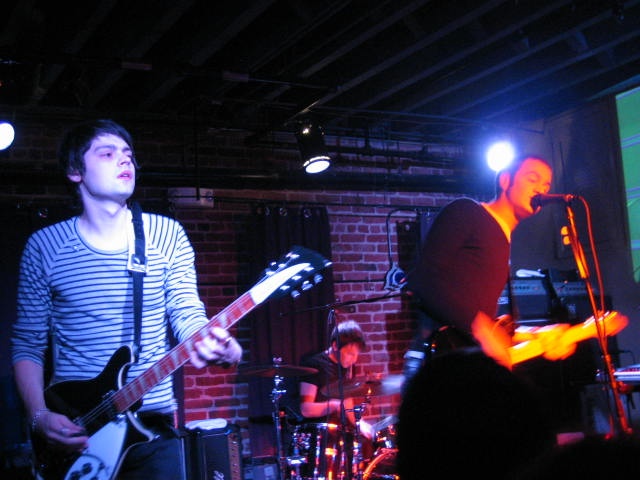
Editors toured throughout 2005 and 2006 for The Back Room.

"All Sparks" was released as the album's fourth single on 27 March 2006; the seven-inch vinyl version includes an acoustic version of "Someone Says" as its B-side. Two versions were released on CD; the first with "The Diplomat" and the second includes "From the Outside", and a remix of "All Sparks" and its music video, which Lee Lennox directed. Editors then embarked on a co-headlining tour of the US with Stellastarr in March and April 2006, and then toured Japan and mainland Europe. In May and June 2006, Editors played a short Ireland-and-UK tour, which ended with a three-date residency at Brixton Academy, London. Following a performance at the Isle of Wight Festival, "Blood" was re-released on 19 June 2006. The 10-inch vinyl version includes a cover of "Road to Nowhere" (1985) by Talking Heads and a remix of "Camera" by Jason Pierce, while the CD edition includes a cover of "Orange Crush" (1988) by R.E.M., a remix of "Camera" by Paul Oakenfold and the music video for "Blood". After an appearance at T in the Park, they went on another US tour in July and August 2006, and then performed at Jersey Live Festival in the Channel Islands in September 2006.

A digipak version of The Back Room that was released in 2005 includes a bonus disc titled "Cuttings" that includes out-takes and B-sides. In 2006, a CD-and-DVD set, which includes footage from a show at Paradiso, Amsterdam, was released in Europe. The Japanese edition, which was released on 23 August 2006, includes "Come Share the View" and "Time to Slow Down" as bonus tracks. The Back Room has been re-pressed on vinyl in 2012, 2018 and 2020. It is included, on CD and vinyl, as part of the box set Unedited (2011) alongside Editors' second studio album An End Has a Start (2007) and third studio album In This Light and on This Evening (2009). "Munich" and "Bullets" are included on the band's first compilation album Black Gold: Best of Editors (2019).

== Critical reception ==
Professional ratings
Aggregate scores
Source	Rating
Metacritic	76/100
Review scores
Source	Rating
AllMusic	4.5/5 stars
Entertainment Weekly	B−
The Guardian	4/5 stars
The Irish Times	4/5 stars
Mojo	4/5 stars
NME	8/10
Pitchfork	6.0/10
Q	3/5 stars
Rolling Stone	3/5 stars
The Village Voice	C+

Music critics gave The Back Room generally favourable reviews. At Metacritic, which assigns a normalised rating out of 100 to reviews from mainstream publications, the album received an average score of 76, based on 23 reviews.

The album's lyrics drew mixed comments. James Jam of NME said The Back Room "hops from hopelessness to hopefulness, often within the space of a chorus". Robert Christgau, writing for The Village Voice, said as Smith "demonstrates, [the lyrics] needn't be morbid or suicidal. His message is often sanely chin-up." Christian Hoard of Rolling Stone said, however, Smith tends to get "lost in his own gloom-addled mind" while trying to change lyrical direction from a negative to a positive one, and arrives at something between the two. Matt Barnes of This Is Fake DIY said Smith's talents are undercut by his "fondness for a hamfisted lyric" and Mxdwn's M. Burns said they could not connect with the album because of the lyrics' "contrived and abstract nature". According to Turnbull, others were criticising the album's lack of "lyrical dexterity"; he also said Smith would occasionally use "clumsily teenage blotches" such as those in "Camera".

Critics more-positively received Smith's vocals, complimenting his tone. Hoard praised Smith for being "blessed with that peculiarly British ability to sound simultaneously suave and pained", and said on the better tracks, the "give-and-take between Smith's gossamer croon and his band's tensile shimmer can be seductive". Crock said Smith sings in a "forceful but wavering voice", likening him to Interpol's Paul Banks. According to AllMusic reviewer MacKenzie Wilson, Smith's voice is, compared to Banks', "passionate without being too steely". The Guardian writer Betty Clarke said Smith "emit[s] low, dissociated vocals" for most of the album, save for "Fingers in the Factories", where his vocals become "sharper than the stabbing rhythm, rendering even the darkness stunning". Chad Grischow of IGN was impressed Smith's voice had a "deep tone and focused intensity that draws you into the song", saying he listened to it several times before he could focus on anything else. Sputnikmusic staff member DaveyBoy likened Smith's voice to an instrument, which he said is "able to sound sophisticated one moment and anguished the next".

Reviewers had divided opinions on Editors' influences from 1980s acts and comparisons to their contemporaries; some ignored these and called the band's music original. The Irish Times' Sinéad Gleeson wrote the band "plough the same furrow of guitar-flecked morbidity" as Joy Division "but with pop firmly at their heart". Jam compared some of the tracks to the works of Bauhaus and Interpol but noted the greatest influence from Joy Division. Burns considered Editors to be Interpol-soundalikes because they "thrive with tight technique but is missing the darkness and depth of ardor"; Michael Lomas of PopMatters said these comparisons came across as lazy but that "listening to The Back Room, they are undeniable". Pitchfork writer Jason Crock said Editors frequently "imitate bands with dramatic vocalists ... but the best moments on The Back Room aren't the theatrical ones—it's when the four of them are playing and discovering their own chemistry". According to Gleeson, compared to several other acts who were "currently plundering '80s music like a supermarket trolley dash, Editors do it with far more imagination while hawking their own sound".

== Commercial performance and accolades ==
The Back Room peaked at number two in album charts in the UK and Scotland. In the US, it reached number 14 on the Billboard Heatseekers Albums component chart and number 21 on the Billboard Independent Albums component chart. It also charted at number 23 in Ireland, number 30 in the Netherlands, number 53 in the Flanders region of Belgium, number 74 in the Wallonia region of Belgium and number 107 in France. The album was ranked at number 182 on the 2005 year-end album chart in the UK and number 75 on the 2006 iteration. It was certified platinum in the UK, and gold in Belgium, Ireland and the Netherlands. The Back Room was nominated for the 2006 Mercury Prize.

"Bullets" originally charted at number 54 in the UK but after its reissue, it peaked at number 27. "Munich", which originally charted at number 22 in the UK, peaked at number 10 after its re-release. It also reached number 42 in Ireland and number 97 in the Netherlands. The British Phonographic Industry (BPI) certified "Munich" silver in February 2021. "Blood" originally charted at number 18 in the UK but its re-release reached number 39. "All Sparks" charted at number 21 in the UK.

== Track listing ==
All songs written by Tom Smith, Chris Urbanowicz, Russell Leetch and Ed Lay.

No.	Title	Length
1.	"Lights"	2:31
2.	"Munich"	3:46
3.	"Blood"	3:29
4.	"Fall"	5:06
5.	"All Sparks"	3:33
6.	"Camera"	5:02
7.	"Fingers in the Factories"	4:14
8.	"Bullets"	3:09
9.	"Someone Says"	3:13
10.	"Open Your Arms"	6:00
11.	"Distance"	3:38

Cuttings (CD2 deluxe edition)
No.	Title	Length
1.	"Let Your Good Heart Lead You Home"	4:37
2.	"You Are Fading"	4:30
3.	"Crawl Down The Wall"	3:34
4.	"Colours"	3:51
5.	"Release"	5:44
6.	"Forest Fire"	3:00

== Personnel ==
Personnel per booklet.

Editors

- Russell Leetch – bass, synthesizer
- Ed Lay – drums
- Tom Smith – vocals, guitar
- Chris Urbanowicz – guitar

Production and design

- Jim Abbiss – producer (all except track 8), recording (all except track 8)
- Ewan Davies – recording (all except tracks 2 and 8)
- Barny Barnicott – mixing (all except tracks 2 and 8)
- Loz Brazil – recording (track 2)
- Cenzo Townshend – mixing (tracks 2 and 8)
- Gavin Monaghan – recording (track 8), producer (track 8)
- Andy Taylor – Pro Tools operator (track 8), engineer (track 8)
- Editors – design, art direction
- The Solution Group – design, art direction
- Wynn White – front cover, rear photography
- Ami Barwell – live photography

== Charts ==
=== Weekly charts ===
Weekly chart performance for The Back Room
Chart (2005–2006)	Peak position
Belgian Albums (Ultratop Flanders)	53
Belgian Albums (Ultratop Wallonia)	74
Dutch Albums (Album Top 100)	30
French Albums (SNEP)	107
Irish Albums (IRMA)	23
Scottish Albums (Official Charts)	2
UK Albums (Official Charts)	2
UK Independent Albums (Official Charts)	27
US Billboard 200	14
US Heatseekers Albums (Billboard)	14
US Independent Albums (Billboard)	21

=== Year-end charts ===
Year-end chart performance for The Back Room
Chart (2005)	Position
UK Albums (OCC)	182
Chart (2006)	Position
UK Albums (OCC)	75

== Certifications and sales ==
Certifications for The Back Room
Region	Certification	Certified units/sales
Belgium (BRMA)	Gold	25,000^{*}
Ireland (IRMA)	Gold	7,500^{^}
Netherlands (NVPI)	Gold	40,000^{^}
United Kingdom (BPI)	Platinum	555,588
United States	—	63,000
Summaries
Worldwide	—	1,000,000
^{*} Sales figures based on certification alone.^{^} Shipments figures based on certification alone.
