= Radio 1's Live Lounge – Volume 4 =

Radio 1's Live Lounge: 4

Compilation album by Various
- Released: 26 October 2009
- Genre: Various
- Length: 133:14
- Label: Sony Music Entertainment
- Producer: Various

Live Lounge chronology
Radio 1's Live Lounge - Volume 3 (2008)	Radio 1's Live Lounge - Volume 4 (2009)	Radio 1's Live Lounge - Volume 5 (2010)

Radio 1's Live Lounge – Volume 4 is a collection of live tracks from Jo Whiley's and Fearne Cotton's Radio 1 shows. The album is the fourth in a series of Live Lounge albums. It consists of both covers and the bands' own songs. The album was released on 26 October 2009.

== Track listing ==
Disc One
No.	Title	Artist	Length
1.	"Poker Face"	Lady Gaga	4:03
2.	"Sweet Dreams/Beat Again" (originally by Beyoncé/JLS)	Tinchy Stryder & Amelle	3:39
3.	"Boom Boom Pow"	The Black Eyed Peas	3:24
4.	"Not Fair (Album Version)"	Lily Allen	3:18
5.	"Electric Feel" (originally by MGMT)	Katy Perry	3:27
6.	"Mama Do (Uh Oh, Uh Oh)" (originally by Pixie Lott)	Newton Faulkner	2:51
7.	"Halo" (originally by Beyoncé)	Florence & The Machine	3:44
8.	"Sexy Chick" (originally by David Guetta feat. Akon)	Paloma Faith	4:06
9.	"A Million Love Songs" (originally by Take That)	Scouting For Girls	3:31
10.	"When You Were Young" (originally by The Killers)	Noisettes	3:30
11.	"Love Sex Magic" (originally by Ciara feat. Justin Timberlake)	Biffy Clyro	2:46
12.	"Paris"	Friendly Fires	3:46
13.	"Wearing My Rolex" (originally by Wiley)	Hot Chip	3:57
14.	"Heavy Cross"	The Gossip	3:54
15.	"If I Were A Boy" (originally by Beyoncé)	Jamie T	3:02
16.	"T-Shirt"	Shontelle	3:16
17.	"Bonkers" (originally by Dizzee Rascal & Armand Van Helden)	The King Blues	2:28
18.	"Tiny Dancer" (originally by Elton John)	DJ Ironik	3:40
19.	"Beautiful Day"	U2	5:05

Disc Two
No.	Title	Artist	Length
1.	"Ready For The Weekend"	Calvin Harris	3:38
2.	"The Sweet Escape" (originally by Gwen Stefani feat. Akon)	Kasabian	3:14
3.	"Beat Again" (originally by JLS)	Little Boots	3:53
4.	"Red"	Daniel Merriweather	3:55
5.	"Candy"	Paolo Nutini	4:36
6.	"Sex On Fire" (originally by Kings of Leon)	Alesha Dixon	3:30
7.	"Spiralling" (originally by Keane)	Sugababes	3:07
8.	"Beggin'" (originally by Frankie Valli & The Four Seasons)	The Saturdays	3:08
9.	"Since U Been Gone"	Kelly Clarkson	3:11
10.	"Times Like These" (originally by Foo Fighters)	The Script	3:21
11.	"Shake It"	Metro Station	2:42
12.	"Single Ladies" (originally by Beyoncé)	Marmaduke Duke	2:19
13.	"Mykonos"	Fleet Foxes	3:42
14.	"Just Dance" (originally by Lady Gaga feat. Colby O'Donis)	Maxïmo Park	3:03
15.	"Daniel"	Bat For Lashes	3:59
16.	"Jump In The Pool" (originally by Friendly Fires)	Lenka	3:38
17.	"Raindrops"	Basement Jaxx	3:25
18.	"Papa Can You Hear Me?"	N-Dubz	4:33
19.	"Bonkers"	Dizzee Rascal	2:53

== See also ==
- Live Lounge
- Radio 1's Live Lounge
- Radio 1's Live Lounge – Volume 2
- Radio 1's Live Lounge – Volume 3
- Radio 1's Live Lounge - Volume 5
- Radio 1: Established 1967
