= Eat Raw Meat = Blood Drool =

Single by Editors

from the album In This Light and On This Evening
- Released: 24 May 2010
- Recorded: 2009
- Genre: Dark wave, synth-pop, alternative dance
- Length: 4:53
- Label: Kitchenware, BMG
- Songwriter(s): Edward Lay, Russell Leetch, Tom Smith, and Chris Urbanowicz
- Producer(s): Flood

Editors singles chronology
"Last Day" (2010)	"Eat Raw Meat = Blood Drool" (2010)	"No Sound but the Wind" (2010)

"Eat Raw Meat = Blood Drool" is a song by British indie rock band Editors and features on their 2009 album, In This Light and On This Evening. It was released on 24 May 2010 as the third single from the album.

The promotional video for the song premiered on 21 April 2010.

== Track listing ==
Promo CD

1. "Eat Raw Meat = Blood Drool (Radio Edit)" – 3:38
2. "Eat Raw Meat = Blood Drool (Acoustic Version)" – 3:33

German CD Maxi Single

1. "Eat Raw Meat = Blood Drool (Radio Edit)" – 3:38
2. "Alone" – 3:10
3. "Thousands Of Lovers" – 3:17
4. "Eat Raw Meat = Blood Drool (Acoustic Version)" – 3:33
5. "Eat Raw Meat = Blood Drool (Magnus 'Veggie' Mix)" – 5:06
6. "Eat Raw Meat = Blood Drool (Steppin Brothers Remix)" – 3:30
