= You Don't Know Love (Editors song) =

Single by Editors

from the album In This Light and On This Evening
- Released: 25 January 2010
- Recorded: 2009
- Genre: Post-punk revival
- Length: 4:40
- Label: Kitchenware, BMG
- Songwriters: Edward Lay, Russell Leetch, Tom Smith, and Chris Urbanowicz
- Producer: Flood

Editors singles chronology
"Papillon" (2009)	"You Don't Know Love" (2010)	"Last Day" (2010)

"You Don't Know Love" is a song by British post-punk revival band Editors and features on their 2009 album, In This Light and On This Evening. It was released on 25 January 2010 as the second single from the album.

The promotional video for the song was shot in Poland (Alchemia Club in Kraków) and features Damien Jalet and Alexandra Gilbert.

== Track listings ==
Promo CD

1. "You Don't Know Love (Radio Edit)" – 3:41
2. "You Don't Know Love (Instrumental Edit)" – 3:41
3. "You Don't Know Love (Album Version)" – 4:40

Download Bundle

1. "You Don't Know Love" - 4:40
2. "You Don't Know Love (Rob da Bank Remix)" - 4:48
3. "You Don't Know Love (Cagedbaby Studio 54 Remix)" - 8:20

iTunes Exclusive Download Bundle

1. "You Don't Know Love" - 4:40
2. "You Don't Know Love (Tom Middleton Remix)" - 8:15
3. "You Don't Know Love (Rob da Bank Remix)" - 4:48
4. "You Don't Know Love (Cagedbaby Studio 54 Remix)" - 8:20

CD (Germany, Australia & Switzerland)

1. "You Don't Know Love (Radio Edit)" – 3:41
2. "These Streets Are Still Home to Me" - 3:18
3. "You Don't Know Love (Boys Noize Classic Mix)" - 7:00
4. "You Don't Know Love (Tom Middleton Remix)" - 8:15
5. "You Don't Know Love (Album Version)" – 4:40

Beatport Download Bundle

1. "You Don't Know Love (Boys Noize Classic Mix)" - 7:00
2. "You Don't Know Love (Tom Middleton Remix)" - 8:15
3. "You Don't Know Love (Tom Middleton Remix Edit)" - 3:57

European Single (CD and Download)

1. "You Don't Know Love (Radio Edit)" – 3:41
2. "These Streets Are Still Home to Me" - 3:18
3. "You Don't Know Love (Boys Noize Classic Mix)" - 7:00
4. "You Don't Know Love (Tom Middleton Remix)" - 8:15
5. "You Don't Know Love (Album Version)" – 4:40

== Charts ==
Chart performance for "You Don't Know Love"
Chart (2010)	Peak position
Belgium (Ultratip Bubbling Under Flanders)	7
