= Munich (song) =

- Cover of the original single from 2005

Single by Editors

from the album The Back Room
- B-side: "Disappear"; "Crawl Down the Wall"; "Colours"; "Release"; "Camera"; "French Disko"; "Find Yourself a Safe Place"
- Released: 18 April 2005
- Recorded: 2005
- Genre: Post-punk revival; indie rock
- Length: 3:46
- Label: Kitchenware
- Songwriters: Edward Lay; Russell Leetch; Tom Smith; Chris Urbanowicz
- Producer: Jim Abbiss

Editors singles chronology
"Bullets" (2005)	"Munich" (2005)	"Blood" (2005)

2006 Reissue
- Cover of the reissue single from 2006

Editors single singles chronology
"Bullets" (2005)	"Munich" (2006)	"All Sparks" (2006)

"Munich" is a song by British post-punk revival band Editors and is featured on their 2005 debut album, The Back Room. It was originally released on 18 April 2005 as the second single from the band. It was re-released on 2 January 2006, peaking at number 10 in the UK Singles Chart. It finished as the 184th best-selling single in the UK, in 2006.

== Composition ==
"Munich" is composed in the key of G minor with a tempo of 150 beats per minute. The song is characterised by its drum groove reminiscent of "Evil" by Interpol and "marching" guitars, featuring tremolo-picked leads.

According to Editors singer and rhythm guitarist Tom Smith, the song's title has no meaning and is unrelated to the German city of Munich. Smith took inspiration from the "weird and familiar at the same time" chords of R.E.M. guitarist Peter Buck for the song's chord progression.

Smith said in 2021 that he wrote the lyrics and chord progression in under five minutes of "hungover soul searching with a sprinkle of self-loathing", having had a difficult time the night before. He felt that the relative lack of words in the song made them more powerful and gave "Munich" a longer-lasting appeal than "Bullets", which had been Editors' breakthrough song.

== In popular culture ==
It is featured on the soundtrack to the video games Saints Row, FIFA Street 2 and Major League Baseball 2K7. The song is played when the guests are being introduced on the English television programme A Question of Sport. It also appeared on the third season finale of Cold Case and in various episodes of the BBC drama Waterloo Road. It is featured in the 2008 film One Missed Call. "Munich" alone came as a free pack-in song on every Zune player bought.

== Track listings ==
All songs written and composed by Chris Urbanowicz, Edward Lay, Russell Leetch and Tom Smith, except where noted.

=== Original release ===
==== 7" vinyl ====
- UK: Kitchenware SKX78 (limited to 3000 copies)

Side one
No.	Title	Length
1.	"Munich"

Side two
No.	Title	Length
1.	"Disappear"

==== CD ====
- UK: Kitchenware SKCD78 (limited to 3000 copies)

No.	Title	Length
1.	"Munich"	3:46
2.	"Crawl Down the Wall"	3:34
3.	"Colours"	3:50

- UK: Kitchenware SKCD78-2

No.	Title	Length
1.	"Munich"	3:47
2.	"Release"	5:43

=== Re-release ===
==== 7" vinyl ====
- UK: Kitchenware SKX83

Side one
No.	Title	Length
1.	"Munich"

Side two
No.	Title	Length
1.	"Camera" (original demo)

==== CD ====
- UK: Kitchenware SKCD83

No.	Title	Length
1.	"Munich"
2.	"French Disko" (Stereolab cover, written by Stereolab)

- UK: Kitchenware SKCD832

No.	Title	Length
1.	"Munich"	3:44
2.	"Find Yourself a Safe Place"	2:54
3.	"Munich" (Cicada remix)	7:48
4.	"Munich" (video)

== Personnel ==
- Russell Leetch – bass
- Ed Lay – drums
- Tom Smith – vocals, rhythm guitar
- Chris Urbanowicz – lead guitar

== Charts ==
=== Weekly charts ===
Chart (2005)	Peak position
UK Singles (OCC)	22

Chart (2006)	Peak position
Ireland (IRMA)	42
Netherlands (Single Top 100)	97
UK Singles (OCC)	10

=== Year-end charts ===
Chart (2006)	Position
UK Singles (OCC)	184

== Certifications ==
Region	Certification	Certified units/sales
United Kingdom (BPI)	Silver	200,000^{‡}
^{‡} Sales+streaming figures based on certification alone.

== Cover versions ==
- "Munich" was covered by Corinne Bailey Rae for Jo Whiley's BBC Radio 1 in 2006 and featured on Radio 1's Live Lounge.
- A version by R.E.M., also for BBC Radio 1, was released on Radio 1's Live Lounge – Volume 3 in 2008.
