= Papillon (Editors song) =

2009 single by Editors

Single by Editors

from the album In This Light and on This Evening
- B-side: "Eat Raw Meat = Blood Drool" (demo)
- Released: 12 October 2009
- Genre: Darkwave, alternative dance
- Length: 5:21 (album version); 3:55 (radio edit)
- Label: Kitchenware; BMG
- Songwriter(s): Edward Lay; Russell Leetch; Tom Smith; Chris Urbanowicz
- Producer(s): Flood

Editors singles chronology
"Bones" (2008)	"Papillon" (2009)	"You Don't Know Love" (2010)

"Papillon" is a song by English rock band Editors. It was released as the lead single from their third studio album, In This Light and on This Evening, on 12 October 2009. A music video for the song was released on 11 September 2009 and directed by Andrew Douglas. "Papillon" charted in several countries, including Belgium's Flanders region, where it was a number-one hit. In the United Kingdom, it peaked at number 23 becoming their last UK top-40 hit as of 2025. The song has regularly been used as "closing piece" of Editors concerts.

== Music video ==
The official music video for "Papillon", lasting three minutes and fifty-five seconds, was uploaded on 11 September 2009 to the official Editors YouTube channel and was directed by Andrew Douglas.

== Track listings ==
7-inch vinyl

1. "Papillon" (radio mix) – 3:55
2. "Eat Raw Meat = Blood Drool" (demo) – 3:45

12-inch vinyl

1. "Papillon" (Tiësto remix) – 8:09
2. "Papillon" (The Japanese Popstars remix) – 7:12

CD (UK release)

1. "Papillon" (radio mix) – 3:55
2. "Papillon" (Tiësto remix) – 8:09

CD (Euro-release – digipack)

1. "Papillon" (radio mix) – 3:55
2. "Eat Raw Meat = Blood Drool" (demo version) – 3:45
3. "Like Treasure" (demo version) – 3:20
4. "Papillon" (Tiësto radio edit) – 4:09

iTunes EP – Non-UK

1. "Papillon" (radio mix) – 3:55
2. "Papillon" (Tiësto radio edit) – 4:09
3. "Eat Raw Meat = Blood Drool" (demo version) – 3:55
4. "Walk The Fleet Road" (demo version) – 3:53
5. "Papillon" (Tiësto remix) – 8:09
6. "Papillon" (The Japanese Popstars remix) – 7:12

iTunes EP – UK

1. "Papillon" (Radio mix) – 3:55
2. "Papillon" (Tiësto remix) – 8:09
3. "Papillon" (Tom Nevilles Sleep Twitch) – 7:56
4. "Papillon" (The Japanese Popstars remix) – 7:12

== Charts ==
=== Weekly charts ===
Weekly chart performance for "Papillon"
Chart (2009–2011)	Peak position
Austria (Ö3 Austria Top 40)	44
Belgium (Ultratop 50 Flanders)	1
Belgium (Ultratop 50 Wallonia)	6
Germany (GfK)	43
Netherlands (Dutch Top 40)	23
Netherlands (Single Top 100)	16
Scotland (OCC)	22
Switzerland (Schweizer Hitparade)	52
UK Singles (OCC)	23

=== Year-end charts ===
Year-end chart performance for "Papillon"
Chart (2009)	Position
Belgium (Ultratop 50 Flanders)	31
Chart (2010)	Position
Belgium (Ultratop 50 Flanders)	57

== Certifications ==
Certifications for "Papillon"
Region	Certification	Certified units/sales
Belgium (BRMA)	Gold	15,000^{*}
^{*} Sales figures based on certification alone.
