= Smokers Outside the Hospital Doors =

2007 single by Editors

Single by Editors

from the album An End Has a Start
- B-side: "An Eye for an Eye"; "Some Kind of Spark"; "The Picture"
- Released: 18 June 2007
- Studio: Grouse Lodge (Rosemount, Ireland)
- Length: 4:57
- Label: Kitchenware
- Songwriters: Tom Smith; Chris Urbanowicz; Russell Leetch; Ed Lay
- Producer: Jacknife Lee

Editors singles chronology
"All Sparks" (2006)	"Smokers Outside the Hospital Doors" (2007)	"An End Has a Start" (2007)

"Smokers Outside the Hospital Doors" is the first single from English rock band Editors' second album, An End Has a Start (2007). It was released as a digital download on 11 June 2007 and as a physical single through CD and vinyl on 18 June 2007 in the United Kingdom. It peaked at number seven on the UK Singles Chart in its first week of physical release and became a moderate to minor hit in Belgium, Ireland, and the Netherlands. A single was also released in the United States. The song was set to debut on Zane Lowe's show on 30 April; however, the song leaked on the internet a few days preceding.

== Production ==
The song was recorded and produced at Grouse Lodge Studios, Ireland, under the supervision of producer Jacknife Lee. Lead vocals, rhythm guitar and piano were provided by Tom Smith, lead guitar and synth by Chris Urbanowicz, bass guitar by Russell Leetch and percussion by Ed Lay. Smith and Lay were also part of the choir, along with producer Jacknife Lee, audio engineer Tom McFall and singer Anne Struther, all of whom were chosen purely because they were in the studio at the time. When performed live, the choir vocals are provided by Smith, Lay and Leetch, rather than using a pre-recorded backing track.

== Structure ==
The intro of the song is an unaccompanied drum beat played for 8 seconds, at which point the lead vocals and piano, both by Tom Smith, enter. The piano part plays a continual progression of three chords: G, C and E minor. At the end of the first verse, the piano is replaced by a short guitar solo, by Chris Urbanowicz, which continues the progression. The second verse returns to piano, which segues into a distorted rhythm guitar part for the chorus.

The chorus itself has two parts: the first part is four lines long and uses the chord progression of D, E minor, A minor, while the second part is two lines long, but repeated twice, and uses G, D, E minor, C. After the second chorus, the song enters a bridge, consisting of just piano and vocals, with a faint synthesised accompaniment. Following the end of the vocal part, the song moves into a break as a bass guitar enters, leading up to a reprise of the guitar solo, accompanied by a choir who repeat the lyrics of the bridge. The song ends with Smith singing the second part of the chorus, accompanied by the lead guitar, with an abrupt fade out on the final syllable.

== Music video ==
The music video for "Smokers Outside the Hospital Doors" was filmed in and around Prague on the Vltava, and depicts, in a nonlinear manner, a young girl with the ability to walk on water escaping from a hospital, escaping via railway lines, a red light district and a Romani encampment to the river Vltava where she attempts to row away, only to run back across the water surface to avoid a police boat, all intercut with clips of Editors playing the song in an abandoned ship. The video ends with Tom Smith at a dockyard meeting the girl, who runs away in fright.

The woman that helps hide the runaway, presumably a prostitute (the woman), changes in appearance. The runaway's hood is alternately flipped up and down and the dog that runs with her might also be different in different scenes. This is all to signify that the runaway has escaped many times before.

The video was directed by Siggi Kinski and Stefán Árni Þorgeirsson of production company Arni & Kinski, who based the video on a bad childhood experience of a hospital. The video was originally to be filmed in London. After this proved prohibitively expensive, production moved to Prague with an entirely new cast.

== Reception ==
Most initial reviews were positive: NME described the song as "audacious, certainly, and very good to boot", adding that "Editors have found their life force in death itself", while MusicOMH stated that "at 5 minutes long it's worth every second." However, some reviews were less favourable; Stereogum described the song as "mildly warmed over post-Coldplay arena rock" and described the percussion of the song as the "incessant, downbeat crash cymbal bashing of every band trying to sound 'big'."

== Track listings ==
UK CD single

1. "Smokers Outside the Hospital Doors"
2. "An Eye for an Eye"

UK 7-inch single

A. "Smokers Outside the Hospital Doors"
B. "Some Kind of Spark"

UK limited-edition 7-inch single

A. "Smokers Outside the Hospital Doors"
B. "The Picture"

European CD single

1. "Smokers Outside the Hospital Doors"
2. "An Eye for an Eye"
3. "The Picture"
4. "Some Kind of Spark"

US CD single

1. "Smokers Outside the Hospital Doors" – 4:55
2. "An Eye for an Eye" – 4:22
3. "The Picture" – 3:48

== Credits and personnel ==
Credits are adapted from the US CD single and An End Has a Start liner notes.

Studios

- Recorded and produced at Grouse Lodge Studios (Rosemount, Ireland)
- Mixed at Olympic Studios (London, England)

Personnel

- Tom Smith – writing
- Chris Urbanowicz – writing
- Russell Leetch – writing
- Ed Lay – writing
- Jacknife Lee – production, recording, programming
- Tom McFall – recording, engineering
- Jon Gray – recording
- Sam Bell – recording, additional programming and engineering
- Dani Castelar – recording assistant
- Cenzo Townsend – mixing
- Neil Comber – mixing assistant
- Idris Khan – cover artwork
- Tom Hingston Studio – design and art direction

== Charts ==
=== Weekly charts ===
Weekly chart performance for "Smokers Outside the Hospital Doors"
Chart (2007)	Peak position
Belgium (Ultratop 50 Flanders)	47
Belgium (Ultratip Bubbling Under Wallonia)	7
Ireland (IRMA)	39
Netherlands (Single Top 100)	89
Scottish Singles Sales (Official Charts)	4
UK Singles (Official Charts)	7

=== Year-end charts ===
Year-end chart performance for "Smokers Outside the Hospital Doors"
Chart (2007)	Position
UK Singles (OCC)	188
