= An End Has a Start (song) =

Single by Editors

from the album An End Has a Start
- B-side: "Open Up"; "An End Has a Start" (Jacknife Lee Remix); "An End Has a Start" (The Whip Remix); "An End Has a Start" (Boom Bip Remix)
- Released: 3 September 2007
- Recorded: 2006
- Genre: Indie rock, post-punk revival
- Length: CD1/Vinyl - 7:25; CD2 - 19:51
- Label: Kitchenware Records (UK); Epic Records (US); FADER Label (US)
- Songwriters: Editors (Edward Lay, Russell Leetch, Tom Smith, Chris Urbanowicz)
- Producer: Jacknife Lee

Editors singles chronology
"Smokers Outside the Hospital Doors" (2007)	"An End Has a Start" (2007)	"The Racing Rats" (2007)

"An End Has a Start" is the title track and second single from Editors' second album. The single was released on 3 September 2007 on CD, maxi-CD and 7" vinyl. The B-side "Open Up" first appeared on the Japanese edition of the album as a bonus track.

The song was used by the American Movie Channel as the backtrack in a montage style commercial, giving the track considerable exposure that it otherwise would not have received. It has also been covered by German folk metal band In Extremo on their 2008 album, Sängerkrieg.

The song reached #27 on the UK Singles Chart in September 2007.

== Track listings ==
UK Digital download:

1. "An End Has a Start" – 3:45
2. "An End Has a Start" (Acoustic) – 4:00
3. "An End Has a Start" (Live) – 3:51

CD1: SKCD95

- Card sleeve
1. "An End Has a Start" – 3:45
2. "Open Up" – 3:40

CD2: SKCD952

- Maxi Card sleeve
1. "An End Has a Start" – 3:45
2. "An End Has a Start" (Jacknife Lee Remix) – 5:24
3. "An End Has a Start" (The Whip Remix) – 5:38
4. "An End Has a Start" (Boom Bip Remix) – 5:04

7" vinyl: SKX95

- Clear vinyl
1. "An End Has a Start" – 3:45
2. "Open Up" – 3:40

European CD single: 449.3087.124 PIL 087 CDS

- Card sleeve
1. "An End Has a Start" – 3:45
2. "The Picture" – 3:50
3. "An End Has a Start" (Acoustic) – 4:00

European CD EP: 449.3087.021 PIL 087 CDS

- Slim Digipack
1. "An End Has a Start" – 3:45
2. "An Eye for an Eye" – 4:25
3. "The Picture" – 3:50
4. "Some Kind of Spark" – 4:26
5. "Open Up" – 3:40
6. "An End Has a Start" (Acoustic) – 4:00

Promo CD1: SKCD95P

- Card sleeve
1. "An End Has a Start" – 3:45
2. "An End Has a Start" (Instrumental) – 3:44

Promo CD2:

- Card sleeve / CD-R acetate
1. "An End Has a Start" (The Whip Remix) – 5:38
2. "An End Has a Start" (The Whip Remix Instrumental) – 5:38
3. "An End Has a Start" (Boom Bip Remix) – 5:04
4. "An End Has a Start" (Jacknife Lee Remix) – 5:24
5. "An End Has a Start" (Jacknife Lee Remix Instrumental) – 5:24

FADER Promo:

1. "An End Has a Start" – 3:45

== Music video ==
The music video for "An End Has a Start" was directed by Diane Martel. It features the band singing in a warehouse type building with models dressed in brightly coloured tights dancing around them.

== Cover ==
German folk metal band In Extremo covered the song on their album Sängerkrieg (2008).
