= Bones (Editors song) =

Single by Editors

from the album An End Has a Start
- Released: 2 June 2008
- Recorded: 2007–2008
- Genre: Post-punk revival; indie rock
- Length: 4:06
- Label: PIAS (Continental Europe)
- Songwriter(s): Tom Smith; Chris Urbanowicz; Russell Leetch; Edward Lay
- Producer(s): Jacknife Lee

Editors singles chronology
"Push Your Head Towards the Air" (2008)	"Bones" (2008)	"Papillon" (2009)

"Bones" was the fifth and final single from An End Has a Start, the second album by Editors. It was only released in Continental Europe under the PIAS label as a download-only single. It was released to help promote the band during the festival run and their support of R.E.M. in July during their German shows. "Bones" was one of the first songs off An End Has a Start to be performed live, along with "The Weight Of The World" in 2006. It has since gone through many changes, most notably the bridge and outro of the song which was previewed via a short video made by the band months before the album came out.

== Video ==
The video includes on stage and behind the scenes footage shot during the European tour in March and April 2008. It was directed by the band's bassist Russell Leetch.

== Charts ==
Chart performance for "Bones"
Chart (2014)	Peak position
Belgium (Ultratip Bubbling Under Flanders)	10
