= In This Light and on This Evening =

Studio album by Editors
- Released: 12 October 2009
- Recorded: 2008–2009
- Studios: Miloco, London; Assault & Battery, London
- Genres: Post-punk revival; dark wave; synth-pop
- Length: 43:36
- Label: Kitchenware
- Producer: Flood

Editors chronology
An End Has a Start (2007)	In This Light and on This Evening (2009)	Unedited (2011)

Singles from In This Light and on This Evening
- 1. "Papillon" Released: 12 October 2009; 2. "You Don't Know Love" Released: 25 January 2010; 3. "Eat Raw Meat = Blood Drool" Released: 24 May 2010

In This Light and on This Evening is the third studio album by English rock band Editors. It was released on 12 October 2009 by Kitchenware Records. The band had said the material would have a more raw and anthemic sound compared to their previous work. The first single from the album was "Papillon". The second single was "You Don't Know Love", released on 25 January of the following year. The third single, "Eat Raw Meat = Blood Drool", was released on 24 May. The album also features a bonus extended play of five songs, called Cuttings II. With lead guitarist Chris Urbanowicz's departure from Editors on 16 April 2012, this was the band's last album to feature Urbanowicz.

== Overview ==
Smith's home city of London dominates the album, both lyrically and musically. He said: "'I actually think it's in every song. In the right time and place, in the right light and on the right evening, something you have seen 1,000 times before can still take your breath away whilst the background of electronic whirrs and hums that run under many of the tracks mimic the constant background noise of the city." The album introduced an increased synthesizer presence to the Editors' sound, drawing comparisons to 1980s bands such as OMD, Depeche Mode, Eurythmics and Talk Talk.

== Critical reception ==
Professional ratings
Aggregate scores
Source	Rating
Metacritic	59/100
Review scores
Source	Rating
AllMusic	3.5/5 stars
Drowned in Sound	7/10
The Guardian	4/5 stars
The Independent	3/5 stars
NME	5/10
Observer Music Monthly	2/5 stars
Pitchfork	3.7/10
Slant Magazine	2.5/5 stars
Spin	3.5/5 stars
The Times	4/5 stars

The album was met with mixed reviews. On the review aggregator site Metacritic, the album got a score of 59/100, indicating "mixed or average reviews", based on 25 reviews from mainstream critics.

== Track listing ==
All tracks written by Edward Lay, Russell Leetch, Tom Smith, and Chris Urbanowicz.

No.	Title	Length
1.	"In This Light and on This Evening"	4:21
2.	"Bricks and Mortar"	6:21
3.	"Papillon"	5:24
4.	"You Don't Know Love"	4:39
5.	"The Big Exit"	4:44
6.	"The Boxer"	4:40
7.	"Like Treasure"	4:52
8.	"Eat Raw Meat = Blood Drool"	4:53
9.	"Walk the Fleet Road"	3:47

Amazon MP3 bonus track
No.	Title	Length
10.	"You Don't Know Love" (demo version)	4:04

Japan edition bonus track
No.	Title	Length
10.	"These Streets Are Still Home to Me"	3:18

Cuttings II (CD2 deluxe edition) and iTunes pre-order bonus tracks
No.	Title	Length
1.	"This House Is Full of Noise"	6:22
2.	"I Want a Forest"	3:59
3.	"A Life as a Ghost"	4:33
4.	"Human"	3:12
5.	"For the Money"	5:54

Belgium edition bonus track (2010)
No.	Title	Length
10.	"No Sound But the Wind" (Live at Rock Werchter 2010)	3:49

== Personnel ==
Personnel adapted from album liner notes.

- Tom Smith, Chris Urbanowicz, Russell Leetch, Edward Lay – band members
- Flood – production
- Ben Hillier – mixing, production
- Tim Young – mastering
- Cenzo Townshend, Rob Kirwan – mixing
- Darren Lawson – mixing assistant
- Liliane Lijn – cover art design
- Tom Hingston Studio – design and art direction

=== Commercial performance ===
Following its release, the album debuted at number one on the UK Albums Chart. It however had a very short chart life, only spending three weeks in the top 40 and five on the top 75, dropping from the top spot to No. 13 in its second week. This makes the album one of the shortest runners to reach number one, matching the five weeks by Little Angels "Jam" in 1993, an album which also dropped to No. 13 the week after.

In 2012 it was awarded a double gold certification from the Independent Music Companies Association which indicated sales of at least 150,000 copies throughout Europe.

== Charts ==
=== Weekly charts ===
Chart (2009–2010)	Peak position
Australian Albums (ARIA)	40
Austrian Albums (Ö3 Austria)	50
Belgian Albums (Ultratop Flanders)	2
Belgian Albums (Ultratop Wallonia)	7
Danish Albums (Hitlisten)	37
Dutch Albums (Album Top 100)	3
French Albums (SNEP)	41
German Albums (Offizielle Top 100)	8
Irish Albums (IRMA)	4
Italian Albums (FIMI)	20
Portuguese Albums (AFP)	25
Scottish Albums (Official Charts)	2
Spanish Albums (Promusicae)	58
Swiss Albums (Schweizer Hitparade)	12
UK Albums (Official Charts)	1
US Heatseekers Albums (Billboard)	8

=== Year-end charts ===
Chart (2009)	Position
Belgian Albums (Ultratop Flanders)	11
Dutch Albums (Album Top 100)	69
UK Albums (OCC)	197

== Certifications ==
Region	Certification	Certified units/sales
Belgium (BRMA)	Platinum	30,000^{*}
United Kingdom (BPI)	Gold	100,000^{^}
^{*} Sales figures based on certification alone.^{^} Shipments figures based on certification alone.
