= EBM (album) =

Studio album by Editors
- Released: 23 September 2022
- Recorded: May – June 2021
- Genres: Synth-pop; industrial rock; EBM; new wave; indietronica
- Length: 52:59
- Label: PIAS
- Producers: Blanck Mass; Justin Lockey; Elliott Williams

Editors chronology
Violence (2018)	EBM (2022)	Surface, Echo & Sound (2026)

Singles from EBM
- 1. "Heart Attack" Released: 20 April 2022; 2. "Karma Climb" Released: 7 June 2022; 3. "Kiss" Released: 10 August 2022; 4. "Vibe" Released: 31 August 2022

Professional ratings
Aggregate scores
Source	Rating
Metacritic	72/100
Review scores
Source	Rating
AllMusic	4/5 stars
Clash	8/10
Mojo	3/5 stars
NME	3/5 stars
Record Collector	4/5 stars
Sonic Seducer	7.22/10
Under the Radar	7.5/10 stars

EBM is the seventh studio album from British band Editors. It was released on 23 September 2022 by PIAS Recordings. The album is named after both the band and their newest member ("Editors/Blanck Mass") and the genre electronic body music.

It is the band's only studio album to feature Benjamin John Power as a full-time member before his departure in 2025, following his production contributions to their previous album, Violence (2018).

== Style and composition ==
EBM has been described by critics as pop, indietronica, new wave, industrial rock and EBM.

== Track listing ==
EBM track listing
No.	Title	Length
1.	"Heart Attack"	5:48
2.	"Picturesque"	5:09
3.	"Karma Climb"	5:18
4.	"Kiss"	7:50
5.	"Silence"	5:40
6.	"Strawberry Lemonade"	6:17
7.	"Vibe"	3:39
8.	"Educate"	6:50
9.	"Strange Intimacy"	6:24
Total length:		52:59

== Charts ==
Chart performance for EBM
Chart (2022)	Peak position
Australian Digital Albums (ARIA)	25
Austrian Albums (Ö3 Austria)	25
Belgian Albums (Ultratop Flanders)	2
Belgian Albums (Ultratop Wallonia)	6
Dutch Albums (Album Top 100)	2
French Albums (SNEP)	122
German Albums (Offizielle Top 100)	6
Italian Albums (FIMI)	97
Polish Albums (ZPAV)	30
Scottish Albums (Official Charts)	4
Spanish Albums (Promusicae)	83
Swiss Albums (Schweizer Hitparade)	10
UK Albums (Official Charts)	10
UK Independent Albums (Official Charts)	3
