= Editors (band) =

English rock band

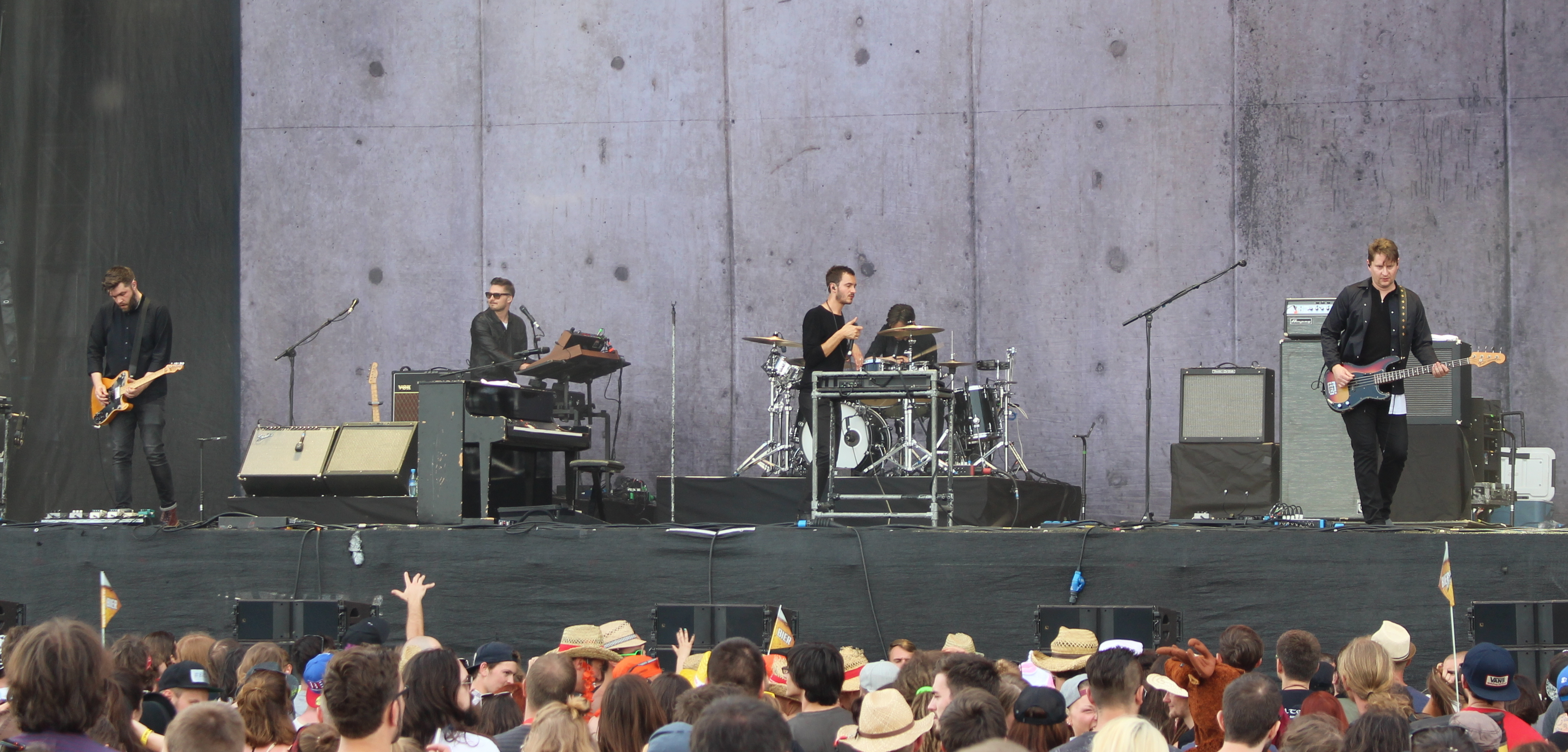
- Editors performing in 2016

Background information
- Also known as: Pilot; The Pride; Snowfield
- Origin: Moseley, Birmingham, England
- Genres: Indie rock; post-punk revival; alternative rock; dark wave
- Years active: 2002–present
- Labels: PIAS; Kitchenware; Epic
- Members: Tom Smith; Russell Leetch; Ed Lay; Justin Lockey; Elliott Williams
- Past members: Chris Urbanowicz; Geraint Owen; Benjamin John Power
- Website: editors-official.com

Editors are an English rock band, formed in 2002 in Birmingham. Previously known as Pilot, The Pride and Snowfield, the band consists of Tom Smith (lead vocals, guitar, piano), Russell Leetch (bass guitar, synthesizer, backing vocals), Ed Lay (drums, percussion, backing vocals), Justin Lockey (lead guitar), and Elliott Williams (keys, synthesizer, guitar, backing vocals). During live performances, the band are joined by longtime touring member Nicholas Willes (guitar, keyboards).

Editors have released seven studio albums, with several million combined sales. Their debut album The Back Room was released in 2005. It contained the hits "Munich" and "Blood" and the following year received a Mercury Prize nomination.

Their follow-up album An End Has a Start went to number one on the UK Albums Chart in June 2007 and earned the band a Brit Awards nomination for best British Band. It also spawned another top 10 hit single, "Smokers Outside the Hospital Doors". The band's third album, In This Light and on This Evening, was released in October 2009 and went to number one on the UK Albums Chart. The band released their fourth studio album, The Weight of Your Love, in July 2013, followed by the self-produced In Dream in October 2015. In 2018, the band released their sixth album Violence. Their seventh album, EBM, was released in September 2022. Their eighth, Surface, Echo & Sound, was released in October 2026.

== History ==
=== Formation (2002–2004) ===
The band met while studying Music Technology at Staffordshire University. They lived in Birmingham and played at venues such as the Jug of Ale and the Flapper & Firkin.

The band was initially known as Pilot and played its first show under that name in 2002. While in college, the band constructed a marketing strategy which involved placing hundreds of promotional stickers across the walls of Stafford asking "Who's the Pilot?". They realised the name was already taken by a 1970s Scottish pop group, so they changed their name to The Pride.

They made a promo under this name with the tracks "Come Share the View" and "Forest Fire" and made the songs available on BBC Radio 1's Onemusic Unsigned. A review of the songs read, "The Pride keep things subliminally lo-fi. Refreshingly simple and restrained, 'Come Share The View' is a lesson in welding hypnotic soundscapes with white noise while showing allegiance to the school of slo-mo on "Forest Fire"". The band took its music offline to encourage more "A&R" representatives to see them perform.

Ed Lay replaced drummer Geraint Owen, who began to focus on his Welsh band The Heights. Under this line-up they became known as Snowfield. They played their debut gig under that name at the request of Fused Magazine in March 2003. The following summer the band self-released a demo six-track EP, of which all six songs went on to become future Editors songs. In the autumn of 2003, after graduation, the band relocated to Birmingham, the home of their management and the nearest big city.

For the next year, the band members worked part-time jobs along in addition to working in the band. After regular gigging around the Midlands, it was not long until word of mouth helped them become a popular unsigned band. They sent out a one-track demo of "Bullets". The demo attracted the interest of several British labels, including thirty A&R reps who came to see them play in Birmingham. In October 2004, the group signed to indie label Kitchenware Records. At that point they changed their band name to Editors.

=== The Back Room (2005–2006) ===
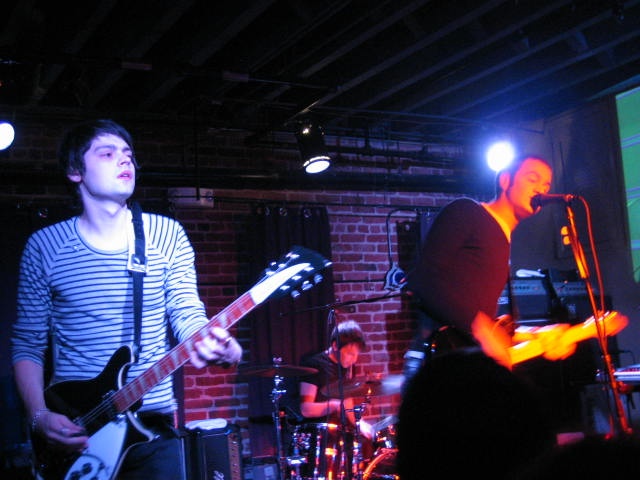
Editors in 2006

After supporting bands such as Puressence and Oceansize, Editors released debut single "Bullets", which was recorded with producer Gavin Monaghan, as a limited edition of 1000 copies on Kitchenware Records on 24 January 2005. The song had previously been played by Zane Lowe on BBC Radio 1, where it was 'Single of the Week'. The limited run sold out on the day of its release, with copies selling later the same week for more than £30 on eBay.

The release of "Munich" followed in April of that year and gave the band their first top 25 hit, a sold out UK tour and a place on MTV's Spanking New Music show in Manchester. At this point, due to the band's increasing popularity, Editors and Kitchenware signed an exclusive distribution deal with Sony BMG. "Blood" was released two months later, reaching number 18 in the UK Singles Chart in its first week, selling 5,286 copies. With these releases their fanbase continued to grow and on 25 July 2005 their debut album The Back Room was released to critical acclaim and commercial success. In its first week, the album entered the charts at number 13, selling 17,627 copies. After re-issuing "Bullets" and achieving another Top 30 hit, Editors gained a high-profile support slot, supporting Franz Ferdinand in arenas across the UK and Europe.

Editors re-issued "Munich" in January 2006, selling one and half thousand more copies than the last time it was released. The song gave Editors their first Top 10 single and an appearance on Top of the Pops. With the single release, The Back Room rose back up the album charts, peaking at number 2. It sold an additional 40,000 copies in the week of "Munich"'s release and went platinum in the process. A joint North American tour with Stellastarr* coincided with the American release of The Back Room in March 2006. It was released by Fader label and sold 35,000 albums after 20 weeks. The band went on to play influential American festivals in 2006 such as Coachella and Lollapalooza. Editors proceeded to perform "Munich" on the American television show Late Night with Conan O'Brien.

At the end of March, Editors released "All Sparks" as a single in the United Kingdom, achieving a position of 21 in the singles chart. After a European tour which included three successive nights at Brixton Academy, Editors re-issued a limited edition of "Blood". It entered the Top 40, pushing the album up the chart 45 places. Shortly after this, The Back Room hit the million mark in sales worldwide and was also nominated for the 2006 Mercury Prize. After a string of high-profile festival shows across Europe, including slots on T in the Park, V 2006 and the Isle of Wight Festival, Editors began work on their second album.

=== An End Has a Start (2007–2008) ===
Editors recorded their second album An End Has a Start with producer Jacknife Lee in Grouse Lodge, Ireland over a two-month period beginning in late November 2006. It was released in June 2007 and went straight to number one on the UK Albums Chart. The album was preceded by the top 10 single "Smokers Outside the Hospital Doors" on the 18th. The song was Editors' highest-charting single, reaching number 7. It also earned its own Making the Video episode on MTV.

"Smokers Outside the Hospital Doors"
"Smokers Outside the Hospital Doors" was the first single from Editors' second album An End Has a Start, reaching number 7 on the UK Singles Chart.

Just after the album's release, Editors played at the Glastonbury Festival with a second from top slot on The Other Stage. They also played many other festivals such as Oxegen, Lowlands and Pukkelpop over the following weeks, as well as playing their first ever tour dates in Australia and New Zealand. They then released the album's title track "An End Has a Start" in September to coincide with their North American tour. Editors went on to play the song live on American television shows such as Jimmy Kimmel Live! and The Tonight Show with Jay Leno.

Upon returning to the UK, the band contributed a cover of the Cure's "Lullaby" to the Radio 1 Established 1967 compilation, again working with producer Gavin Monaghan, which was released on 1 October 2007. Shortly after this, Editors played a 75-minute set for the BBC Electric Proms at KOKO in London with backing from a classical string quartet. In November, they released "The Racing Rats" as the third single off the album. Editors played it live on Friday Night with Jonathan Ross and it helped the song reach number 26 on the UK charts. It also reached number 12 on the Dutch Top 40, the band's highest ever single charting outside of the UK at that point.

For the first two months of 2008, Editors played 30 shows on a tour across America and Canada. During the tour Editors were nominated for a Brit Award, in the Best British Group Category. Also as a result of the nomination, one of the North American tour dates had to be cancelled, as the band had to return to London to attend the prize ceremony. A month later, Editors announced "Push Your Head Towards the Air" to be the fourth single from An End Has a Start. This release was a limited special edition which was ineligible to chart. Along with this release Editors engaged in their biggest and most extensive British tour to date. They played arenas such as the 12,000 capacity National Indoor Arena in Birmingham and two sold out dates in London's Alexandra Palace.

In June, they released "Bones" as a download only single in Continental Europe to coincide with the summer festival season, the video of which was directed by the band's bassist Russell Leetch. Shortly afterwards, Editors played at the Glastonbury Festival, playing on the pyramid stage for the first time. The band then played their second major support slot of their history supporting R.E.M. on a 16 date summer tour across Europe alongside their festival dates which included the headlining of the Lowlands Festival in August.

=== In This Light and on This Evening (2009–2010) ===
Lead singer Smith revealed that the band will explore a new direction on their next album, pursuing a new, rawer sound. Before January 2009, Editors had written around eighteen new songs for the new album and they have been described as some of the most synthetic, raw and anthemic songs they have written to date. In October the band went to the studio to record some demos. The band spent the first week of April recording the album and on 8 April, they released a short video with information about the recording process. It announced that Mark 'Flood' Ellis would be the producer for the album. Earlier on in the year, the sound of the album was said to have a very electric feel; the band often using the Terminator theme song as a reference.

On 2 June 2009, it was announced that the new album title would be In This Light and on This Evening and that they would be the first band to play at the new O2 Academy Birmingham. Through producer Flood's heavy usage of synthesisers, the album provided a synthpop and post-punk sound to Editors' production.

The album was released on 12 October and debuted at number one on the UK Albums Chart. Alongside the album, the band released lead single "Papillon" and it led them to their first taste of number one success outside the UK, with the song hitting the top position in Belgium and being certified Gold in the process. After releasing singles "You Don't Know Love", "Last Day" and "Eat Raw Meat = Blood Drool" to limited chart success, it was announced that their unreleased song "No Sound But the Wind" would appear on the New Moon soundtrack. A live version of the song was later released in continental Europe in September 2010 and again achieved the same success as "Papillon" in Belgium, going to number 1 and being certified gold.

In November 2010, it was confirmed that a boxset called Unedited compiling the first 3 albums, as well as B-sides and previously unreleased songs on 7 12" records, 7 CDs and 7 MP3 albums, alongside a book of photos and words, would be released in early 2011. The boxset included the full band version of "No Sound But the Wind", demos of "Camera" and "These Streets Are Still Home to Me", and an unreleased version of "The Weight of the World", called "Every Little Piece".

=== The Weight of Your Love and Urbanowicz's departure (2011–2014) ===
On 26 November 2010, Smith announced on the band's website that they had started working on a new album, which would again be produced by Flood, and that they would be recording "in stages over 2011," with first rehearsals having started in "a matter of days."

On 26 March 2011, Editors performed their first tour date of the year at the Royal Albert Hall as the headline act for the penultimate show in the 2011 Teenage Cancer Trust, during which they showcased two new songs, "Two Hearted Spider" and "The Sting". In October 2011, Editors played their first shows ever in Latin America with two dates in Mexico City.

In October 2011, Smith spoke to Q Radio about the new album. "It's still going to be fairly electronic, I think, compared to our earlier records. So far it feels quite muscular with a bit of swagger and a bit more of a groove. The last record was liberating in lots of different ways and I think we just need to, kind of, build on that..... with a nod to our past as well. It's our fourth record and we don't want to feel like we're doing the same thing again."

On 22 November 2011, Russell Leetch, the band's bassist, posted on the band's official site, saying they had seven songs ready to record and some more ideas "floating around" and the album would "be with you next year."

On 16 April 2012, it was announced that Chris Urbanowicz had left the group due to a difference in musical direction.

Following Urbanowicz's departure, the band played their first shows as a five-piece with new members Justin Lockey and Elliott Williams in Birmingham, UK, on 26 and 27 June 2012. On 29 June, they played at Main Square Festival in Arras, France, and on 30 June they headlined Rock Werchter festival in Belgium. At the shows they played new versions of "Two Hearted Spider" and "The Sting" as well as two new songs, "Sugar" and "Nothing".

On 8 April 2013, Smith stated via his official Twitter account that "the record is being mastered today. it's finished. done."

On 6 May 2013, Zane Lowe stated via his official Twitter account that the new Editors record would be titled The Weight of Your Love. The first single from this album was "A Ton of Love". In February 2014, the band released the fourth single, "Sugar".

During 2014, Elliott Williams left the band for a period of touring to work on his own music project YdotOdotU, supporting the 1975. The band continued to tour with musician Nicholas Willes.

=== In Dream (2014–2016) ===
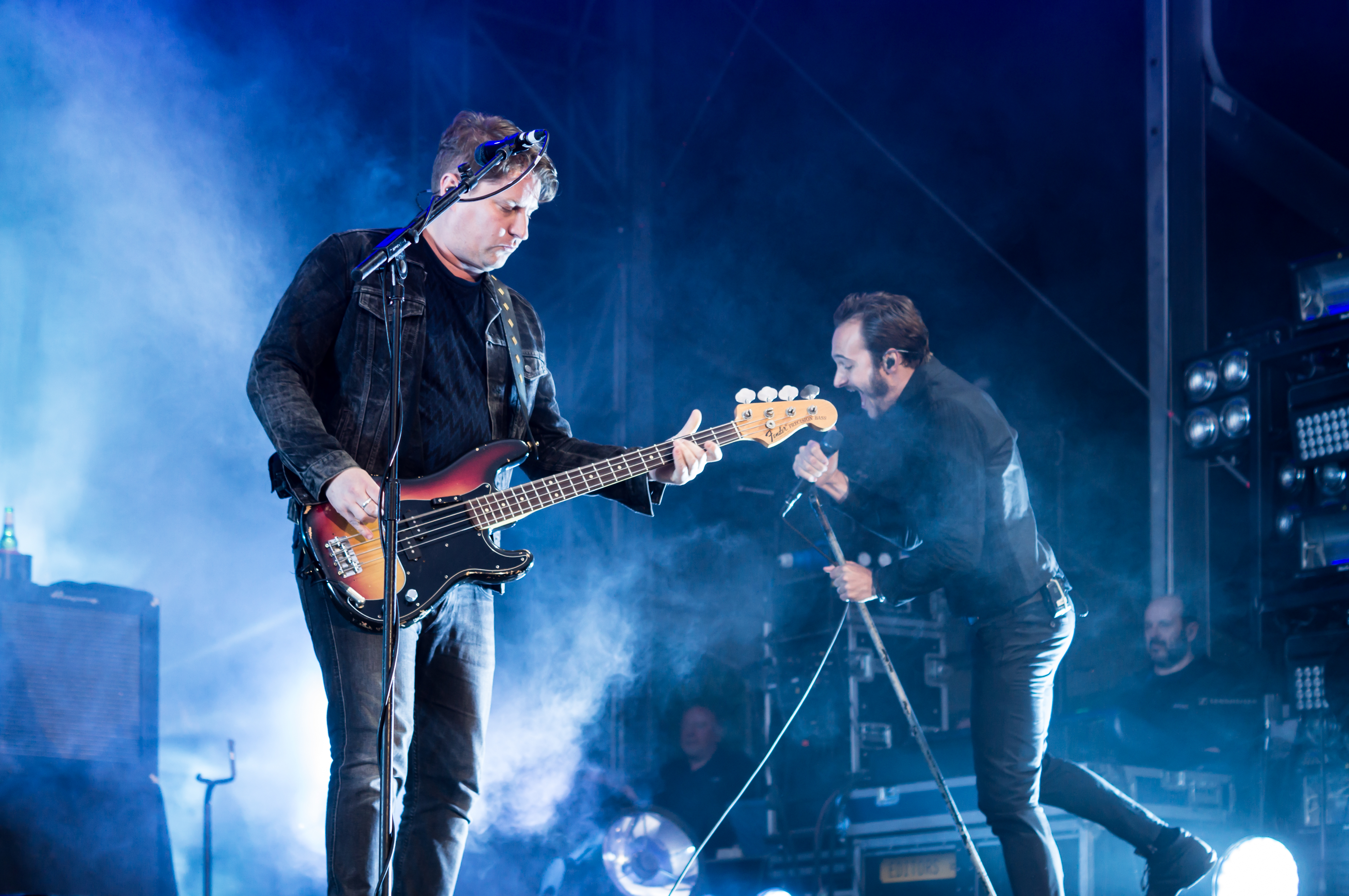
Editors performing in 2017

In October 2014, the band reconvened in Scotland to work on their fifth album. During a session supporting Andy Burrows on Jo Wiley's Radio 2 show, Tom Smith confirmed the album's songs had been written.

On 20 April 2015, the band released a new song entitled 'No Harm' for free download. The song later became available through retailers, and on 11 May, its official video was posted on their YouTube channel. On 18 June, they released a video for the album's lead single, 'Marching Orders'. The video, directed by Rahi Rezvani (as was 'No Harm'), was filmed in the Western Highlands of Scotland. The song was released on 19 June for digital download, and a limited run of 300 12" vinyl test pressings were distributed randomly throughout Oxfam stores.

On 15 July 2015, the band announced the album In Dream via Facebook. It is the first Editors record to feature a duet. The third single and video 'Life is a Fear' got its first play on Zane Lowe's Apple Music Beats1 radio show on 11 August 2015. Its video, again directed by Rahi Rezvani, was uploaded to YouTube on the same day. On 22 September, Editors shared 'The Law', an album track which features Rachel Goswell of Slowdive.

The fifth album In Dream, produced by Editors themselves and mixed by Alan Moulder, was released on 2 October 2015. It marks the band's collaboration with the Iranian born Dutch photographer, film and music video director Rahi Rezvani who also directed the video for 'Ocean of Night', released on 24 November. In October 2015, Editors together with Brussels Beer Project has released their own beer 'Salvation', named after a track on their album In Dream.

In support of the album the band embarked on a 42-date tour, playing throughout October, November and December in the UK, Ireland and Europe. Editors supported Manic Street Preachers across the UK on the 20th anniversary tour of the album Everything Must Go. They also performed at Glastonbury, Bråvalla, Rock Werchter, Bilbao BBK Live 2016 and more than 20 festivals.

=== Violence (2018) ===
Editors released their sixth album, Violence, on 9 March 2018. The lead single, 'Magazine', premiered on Jo Whiley's BBC Radio 2 show on 15 January 2018. The second single "Hallelujah (So Low)" premiered on Annie Mac's BBC Radio 1 show on 21 February 2018.

=== Black Gold (2019–2020) ===
In 2019, the band released their first compilation album, Black Gold, featuring 13 tracks from across their career along with three new songs: "Black Gold", "Frankenstein" and "Upside Down", which were produced by Jacknife Lee. The deluxe edition of the release featured eight stripped-down acoustic versions of previously released material under the title Distance: The Acoustic Recordings. The release was followed by a 2020 best of tour.

=== EBM (2022) ===
On 20 April 2022 the band released the single "Heart Attack", and announced the addition of Benjamin John Power, who had previously worked with the band on the Violence album, as an official band member. On 23 September 2022, the band released their seventh album, EBM.

=== Surface, Echo & Sound (2026–present) ===
In April 2026, Editors released the single "Call It In", and announced a 2027 tour of the UK and Europe. On 23 June they released the single "The Rush", and also announced their eighth studio album Surface, Echo & Sound, which was released on 30 October 2026.

== Musical style ==
Editors' own variation of dark indie guitar rock draws on influences from both older and contemporary bands. Their influences include Echo & the Bunnymen, Joy Division, the Strokes, the Walkmen, Elbow, and R.E.M. The band draw their musical style particularly from the latter two bands' debut albums Asleep in the Back and Murmur. Smith has commented that "we're dark and moody so yeah we build on the sound of the likes of Joy Division, Echo and the Bunnymen and The Chameleons... Obviously we were too young when these bands came out, so it's only more recently that we discovered them." Upon Editors' first appearances in the British music scene, they were also heavily compared to American indie band Interpol.

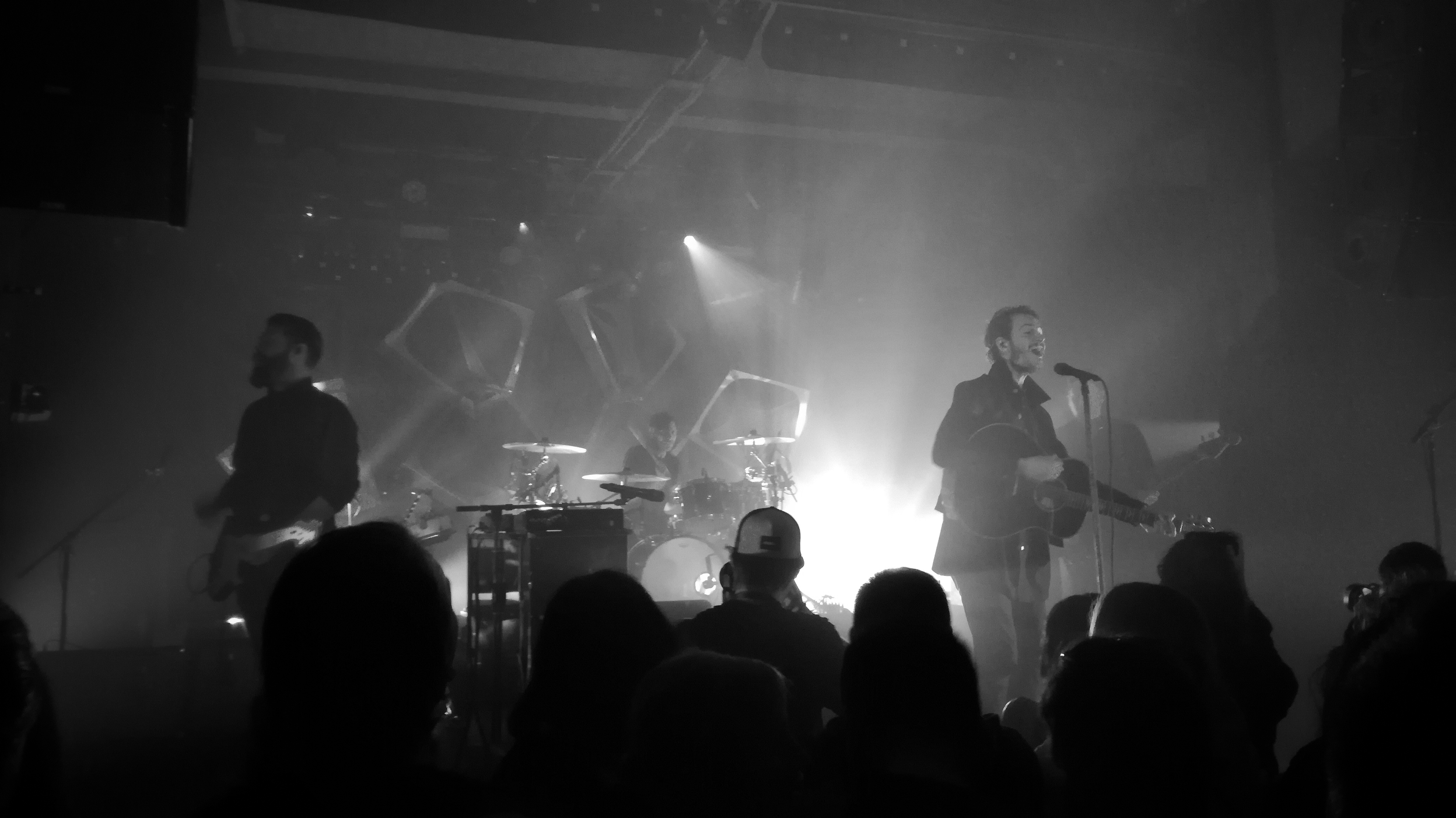
Editors performing in Prague in 2018

Editors' first album, The Back Room, was described as having a wiry and raw sound, which led it to being famously dubbed 'dark disco' by the NME. This sound was created by the use of synthesisers, catchy guitar riffs and simple, ambiguous lyrics. An End Has a Start showed progression to a new 'bigger' sound. This new sound was created by adding more textured layers to the songs as well as incorporating new forms of music into them. These include the adding of a choir in "Smokers Outside the Hospital Doors" and the inclusion of the sounds of the band playing Hide-and-seek in the song "Spiders".

Lead singer Smith announced that the band would explore a new direction on their next album, pursuing a new, rawer sound. The new sound materialised itself on the third album through the use of traditional synthesisers instead of the band's previous use of guitars. The producer of In This Light and on This Evening, Flood also increased the importance of "vibe" in the music's sound, making it darker than the previous two albums, while also attempting to make the album sound as if it had been recorded live.

While Smith tends to write the lyrics and chords, song writing overall is a collaborative effort. The song writing starts with Smith on the piano or acoustic guitar where he records them and sends them to the other band members where the song is turned into a full 'Editors song'. Smith has said that he purposely makes the lyrics ambiguous so people can draw their own conclusions.

"To us, it's interesting if it has a darkness," said Smith in 2015. "Whatever that is. On the lyric side of things, if I was singing about dancefloors or happier or rosier things, it wouldn't ring true for me. I don't know why that is. People quite often say, 'oh, you write these sad lyrics but you're not a sad person' - and I'm not... I don't think you need to be sad to write a sad song, everybody has a dark side."

== Members ==
Current members

- Tom Smith – lead vocals, rhythm guitar, piano (2002–present)
- Russell Leetch – bass guitar, synthesizer, backing vocals (2002–present)
- Ed Lay – drums, percussion, backing vocals (2003–present)
- Justin Lockey – lead guitar (2012–present)
- Elliott Williams – keyboards, synthesizer, rhythm guitar, backing vocals (2012–present)

Current touring musicians

- Nicholas Willes – rhythm guitar, keyboards, synthesizer (2014–present)

Former members

- Geraint Owen – drums (2002–2003)
- Chris Urbanowicz – lead guitar (2002–2012)
- Benjamin John Power – keyboards, synthesizers, electronics (2022–2025)

== Discography ==
Studio albums

- The Back Room (2005)
- An End Has a Start (2007)
- In This Light and on This Evening (2009)
- The Weight of Your Love (2013)
- In Dream (2015)
- Violence (2018)
- EBM (2022)
- Surface, Echo & Sound (2026)
