= Radio 1: Established 1967 =

2007 covers compilation album

Compilation album by Various
- Released: 1 October 2007
- Label: Universal Music TV
- Producer: Various

Professional ratings
Review scores
Source	Rating
NME	3/10
Pitchfork	3.4/10

Radio 1: Established 1967 is a compilation album consisting of covers recorded for BBC Radio 1 by a number of artists to celebrate the 40th anniversary of the radio station. There are 40 covers recorded by 40 different artists. Each artist chose a song from their assigned year, with the only exception being the Kaiser Chiefs – they were required to cover "Flowers in the Rain" by the Move, as it was the first song played on Radio 1. The album was released on 1 October 2007. The Raconteurs appear as the only band to cover a song, and have one of their own songs covered. Madonna also appears as the only artist to have more than one song covered.

Not all the years correspond to the original year of release, e.g. 1968, 1987, 1990, 1991, 1992, 1997 and 1999. The songs were however, remixed or re-released in those years.

== Track listing ==
=== Disc one ===
#	Title	Artist	Artist covered	Year
1	"Flowers in the Rain"	Kaiser Chiefs	The Move	1967
2	"All Along the Watchtower"	The Fratellis	Bob Dylan (based on the version by The Jimi Hendrix Experience)	1967 (Dylan version); 1968 (Hendrix version)
3	"Cupid"	Amy Winehouse	Sam Cooke (based on the version by Johnny Nash)	1961 (Cooke version); 1969 (Nash version)
4	"Lola"	Robbie Williams	The Kinks	1970
5	"Your Song"	The Streets	Elton John	1971
6	"Betcha by Golly, Wow"	Sugababes	Connie Stevens (popularised by The Stylistics)	1970 (Stevens version) (Note: as "Keep Growing Strong"); 1972 (Stylistics version)
7	"You're So Vain"	The Feeling	Carly Simon	1972
8	"Band on the Run"	Foo Fighters	Paul McCartney & Wings	1974
9	"Love Is the Drug"	Kylie Minogue	Roxy Music	1975
10	"Let's Stick Together"	KT Tunstall	Wilbert Harrison (based on the version by Bryan Ferry)	1962 (Harrison version); 1976 (Ferry version)
11	"Sound and Vision"*	Franz Ferdinand	David Bowie	1977
12	"Teenage Kicks"	The Raconteurs	The Undertones	1978
13	"Can't Stand Losing You"	Mika VS Armand Van Helden	The Police	1978
14	"Too Much Too Young"	Kasabian	The Specials	1980
15	"Under Pressure"	Keane	Queen & David Bowie	1981
16	"Town Called Malice"	McFly	The Jam	1982
17	"Come Back and Stay"	James Morrison	Jack Lee (popularised by Paul Young)	1981 (Lee version); 1983 (Young version)
18	"Careless Whisper"	Gossip	George Michael	1984
19	"The Power of Love"	The Pigeon Detectives	Huey Lewis and the News	1985
20	"Don't Get Me Wrong"	Lily Allen	The Pretenders	1986

* - features backing vocals by Girls Aloud

=== Disc two ===
#	Title	Artist	Original artist	Year
1	"You Sexy Thing"	Stereophonics	Hot Chocolate	1987
2	"Fast Car"	Mutya Buena	Tracy Chapman	1988
3	"Lullaby"	Editors	The Cure	1989
4	"Englishman in New York"	Razorlight	Sting	1990
5	"Crazy for You"	Groove Armada	Madonna	1991
6	"It Must Be Love"	Paolo Nutini	Labi Siffre (based on the version by Madness)	1971 (Siffre version); 1992 (reissue of the Madness version)
7	"All That She Wants"	The Kooks	Ace of Base	1992
8	"You're All I Need to Get By"	Mark Ronson featuring Wale and Tawiah	Method Man and Mary J. Blige	1995
9	"Stillness in Time"	Calvin Harris	Jamiroquai	1995
10	"No Diggity"	Klaxons	Blackstreet	1996
11	"Lovefool"	Just Jack	The Cardigans	1996
12	"Ray of Light"	Natasha Bedingfield	Madonna	1998
13	"Drinking in L.A."	The Twang	Bran Van 3000	1999
14	"The Great Beyond"	The Fray	R.E.M.	1999
15	"Teenage Dirtbag"	Girls Aloud	Wheatus	2000
16	"Like I Love You"	Maxïmo Park	Justin Timberlake featuring Clipse	2002
17	"Don't Look Back into the Sun"	The View	The Libertines	2003
18	"Toxic"	Hard-Fi	Britney Spears	2004
19	"Father and Son"	The Enemy	Cat Stevens (based on the version by Ronan Keating featuring Stevens)	1970 (Stevens version); 2004 (Keating and Stevens version)
20	"Steady, As She Goes"	Corinne Bailey Rae	The Raconteurs	2006
