= Tom Smith (Editors musician) =

English musician (born 1981)

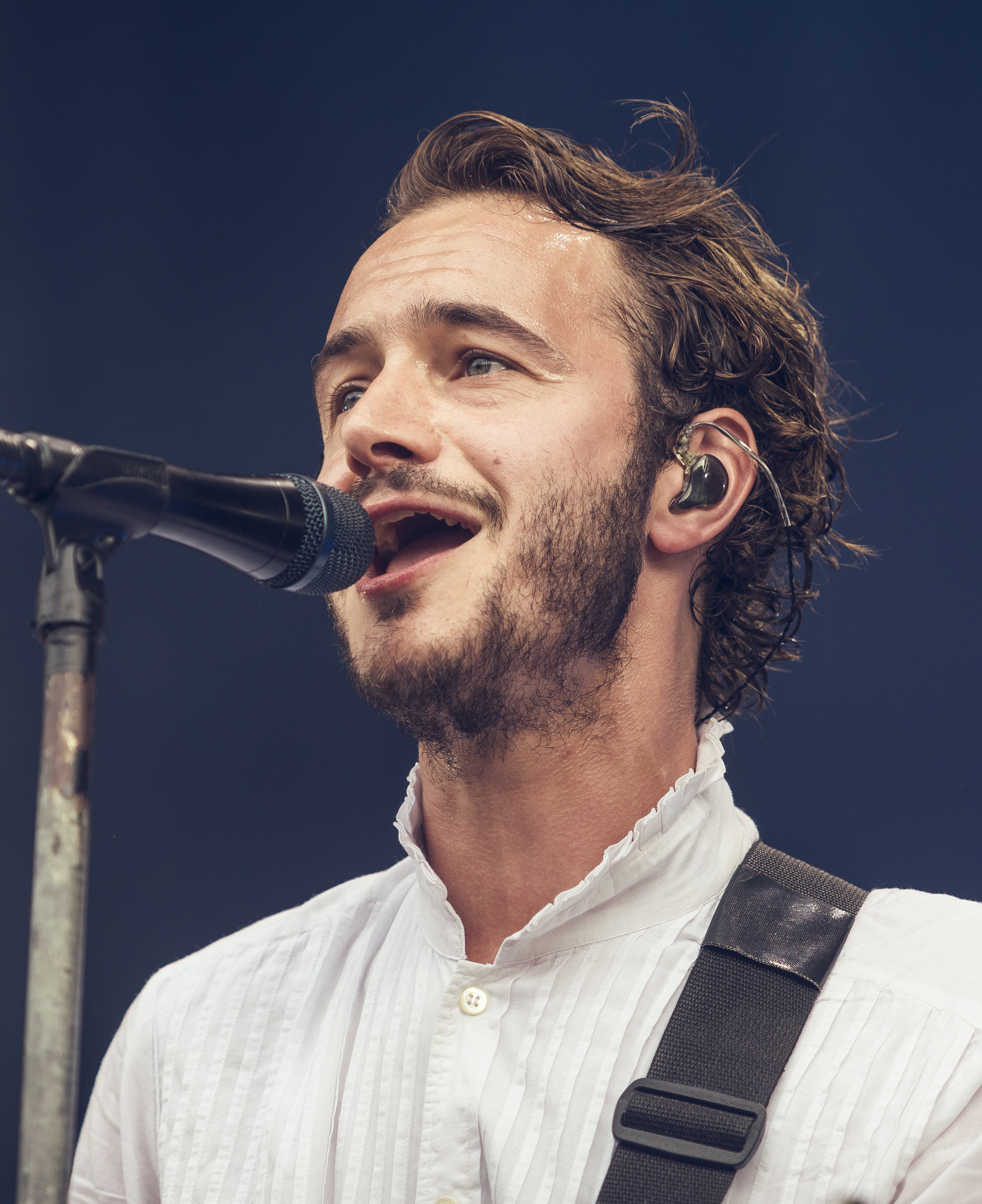
- Smith performing in 2018

Background information
- Born: 29 April 1981 (age 45); Stroud, Gloucestershire, England
- Genres: Indie rock; post-punk revival; alternative rock; electronic rock
- Occupations: Musician; singer; songwriter
- Instruments: Vocals; guitar; piano; keyboards
- Years active: 2002–present
- Label: Kitchenware
- Spouse: Edith Bowman

Thomas Michael Henry Smith (born 29 April 1981) is an English musician, best known as the lead singer, songwriter, keyboardist and rhythm guitarist of the indie rock band Editors.

== Early life ==
Smith is the son of high school science teachers Sylvia and John Smith. He grew up in Stroud, Gloucestershire, where he attended Woodchester Endowed Primary School and learned to play the guitar under the guidance of the school's headmaster. He then attended Archway School in Stroud, where his parents taught physics and chemistry. He later studied music technology at University of Staffordshire and met his future Editors bandmates.

== Career ==
=== Editors ===
After a number of name changes and preluding singles, Editors released their debut album The Back Room on 25 July 2005 to critical acclaim. The album included singles such as "Bullets", "Munich" and "Blood". The warm reception for the album was exemplified by the band's nomination for the Mercury Prize in 2006. When Smith lost his voice during the 2006 SXSW concert, the band had to cancel the last song of their first gig.

An equally well received second album, An End Has a Start, followed on 25 June 2007, which included singles such as "Smokers Outside the Hospital Doors" and the eponymous track. In July 2008, he contributed a cover of "Bonny" (by Prefab Sprout) for the UK edition of the Independents Day charity album. Editors released their third album In This Light and on This Evening on 12 October 2009, which marked a stylistic transition to a more electronic-influenced sound.

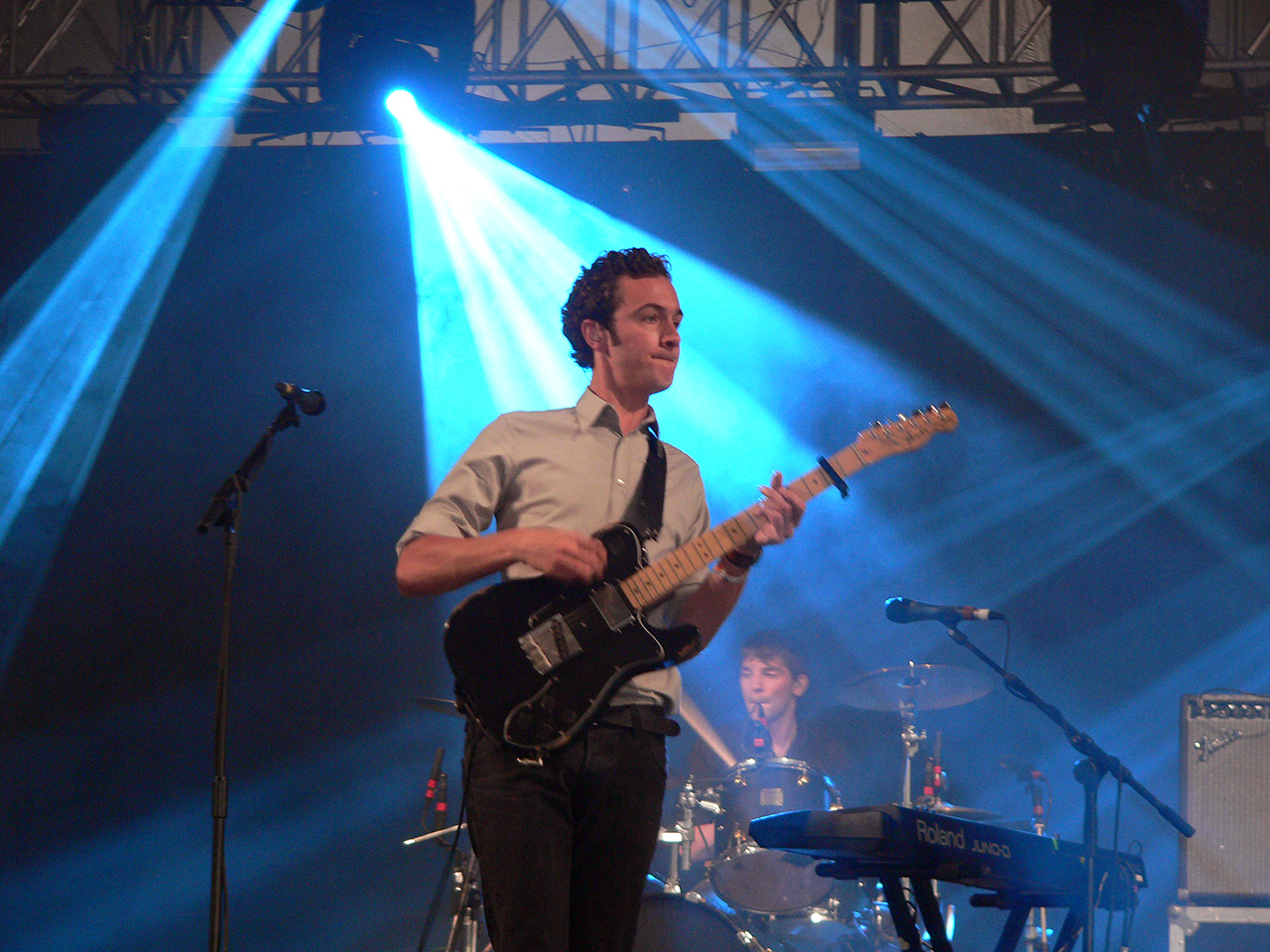
Smith performing in 2006

Smith performed a solo show in February 2012 in Brussels, where he sang old and new Editors songs. Editors released their fourth studio album The Weight of Your Love on 28 June 2013, after a hiatus and the departure of guitarist Chris Urbanowicz in 2012. On the first recording sessions of the album, Smith stated that it had been "a long, hard couple of years and it got pretty dark because whenever we tried creating new songs it wasn’t good enough. Chris's heart wasn’t in it any more. For a year, we'd leave rehearsals feeling very negative and uninspired." Smith also said that "I've talked for a long time about my love of American bands like R.E.M. and Arcade Fire, and that's the type of sound our new songs are going towards. They're more straightforward than our last album. That was more experimental, whereas the new songs could be played on an acoustic guitar. I don't know what a hit is any more, but these songs feel very classic and immediate." The album was mostly recorded live. Regarding the sound of the album, Smith stated that it "[has] a foot in that alt rock/Americana world" and that it feels "untouchable at times". Lyrically, the album focuses on "love songs... that don't adhere to the traditional love song type". Smith explained, "If I ever find myself writing something too straightforward, I try to twist it, so it ends up odd and baffling."

The following album, In Dream, was released on 2 October 2015. According to Smith, the record was driven by a belief that "music can be both pop and experimental." "It feels like a progression from our third record. It was very electronic, but I feel like the last record had to be a guitar record to prove to ourselves that we could be a band," says Smith. "To us, it's interesting if it has a darkness. Whatever that is. On the lyric side of things, if I was singing about dancefloors or happier or rosier things, it wouldn't ring true for me. I don't think you need to be sad to write a sad song, everybody has a dark side."

Editors released their sixth album Violence on 9 March 2018, followed by their seventh album EBM on 23 September 2022.

=== Other work ===
Smith has collaborated with a number of artists, including Cicada on the songs "Executive" and "Talking" from their 2009 album Roulette, the song "The Good Book" by Tired Pony on the 2010 album The Place We Ran From. In 2011, Smith contributed vocals for songs "Joshua" by Northern Irish electronic band The Japanese Popstars and "The Call" by London/Manchester progressive house project Raized by Wolves.

In October 2011, Smith announced that he was collaborating with his good friend Andy Burrows under the moniker Smith & Burrows. Their album Funny Looking Angels was released on 25 November 2011. In December 2011, Smith & Burrows played a number of shows throughout Europe. Smith also provided backing vocals to the lead single from the second Andy Burrows' solo album Company, "Keep On Moving On". Smith also sang in Burrows' track "Watch Me Fall Again" from his third album Fall Together Again (2014).

In 2012, Smith worked with the French band Indochine for the song "The Lovers" on their album Black City Parade.

In 2013, Smith contributed vocals for the song "Lux Lisbon" by German rapper Casper on his album Hinterland.

In 2014, Belgian dance project Magnus teamed up with Smith for their song "Singing Man", which was the lead single from their second album Where Neon Goes to Die.

== Artistry ==
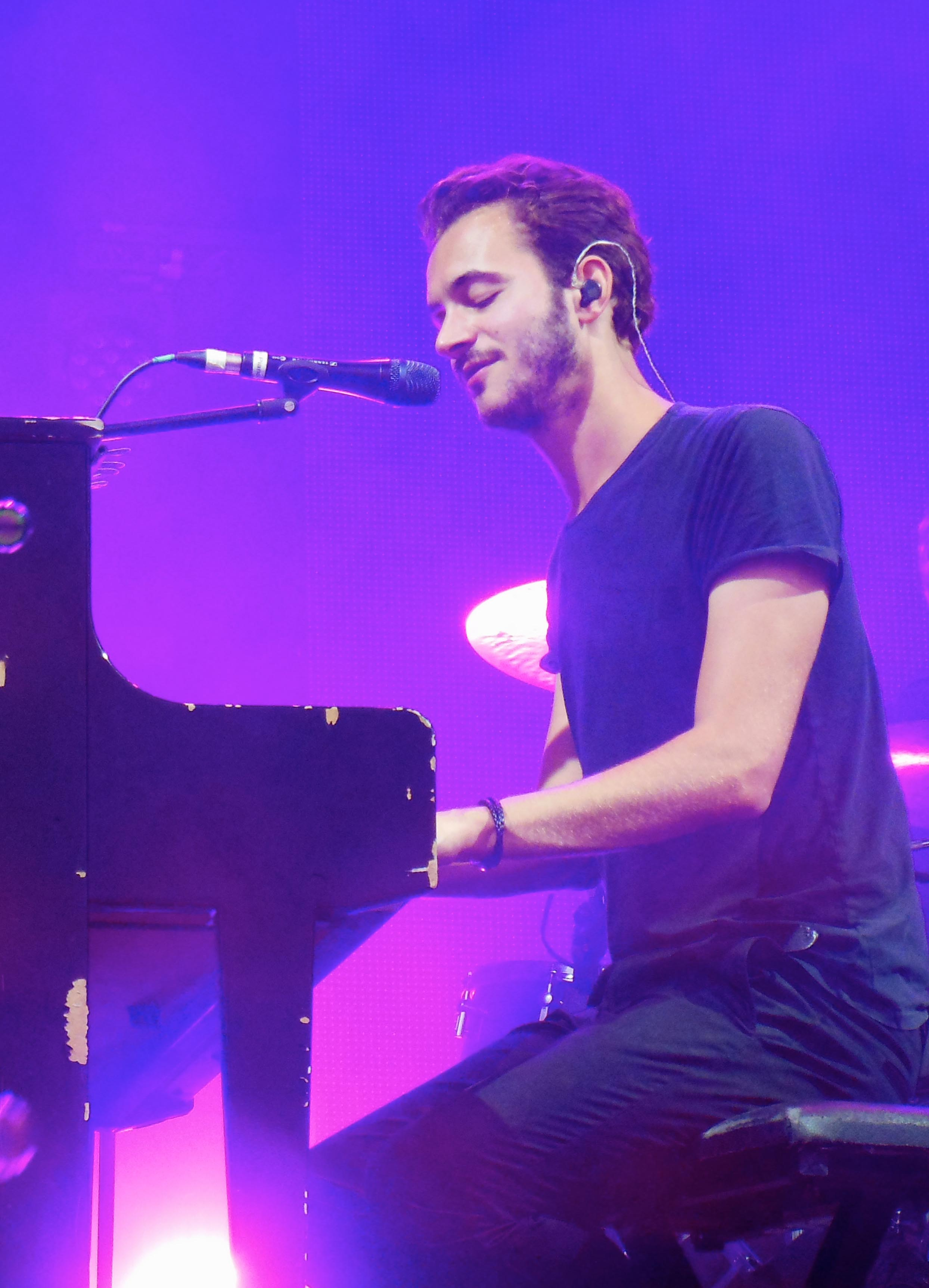
Smith in 2014

Smith's vocal style has been compared to that of post-punk singers such as Ian Curtis, Paul Banks, Robert Smith, and Michael Stipe. He mainly uses a Gibson ES-335 when playing guitar, whilst also playing a Fender Telecaster Custom. He has stated that most of Editors' music begins with him composing on his piano or acoustic guitar.

As a teenager, Smith listened to Britpop, including the albums Definitely Maybe by Oasis and Parklife by Blur. Because of these musical influences, he stated, "Suddenly, all I wanted to do was to be in a band. I learned to play the guitar by playing those records." In 2006, he stated that Murmur by R.E.M. was his favourite album of all time. Editors drummer Edward Lay had mentioned this in an interview in 2005, saying, "Tom's favourite album is R.E.M.'s Murmur, so they were his favourite band whilst growing up and I think they've always maintained a certain cool vibe about everything they've released. They haven't sold out at all, so they're big influences not just in songwriting, but the way they've protected themselves as musicians and as a band." Smith has also expressed admiration for performers such as Bruce Springsteen (whom he described as "a legendary artist who's still got that magic he started with"), Mogwai (a favourite since he was a teenager), Prefab Sprout, and Peter Gabriel (overcoming his initial skepticism that Gabriel made "music for your dad").

== Personal life ==
Smith lives in Stroud with his wife, Scottish radio DJ Edith Bowman, whom he began dating in 2005. They were married on 22 December 2013, and have two sons.

Smith is an avid fan of Arsenal FC. He is a friend of fellow musicians Guy Garvey and Andy Burrows. In April 2011, he ran the London Marathon alongside Editors bandmate Russell Leetch, raising over £10,000 for Oxfam.

== Discography ==
Solo

- There Is Nothing in the Dark That Isn't There in the Light (5 December 2025)

With Andy Burrows

- Funny Looking Angels (2011)
- Only Smith & Burrows Is Good Enough (2021)
