= Russell Leetch =

English bass guitarist (born 1982)

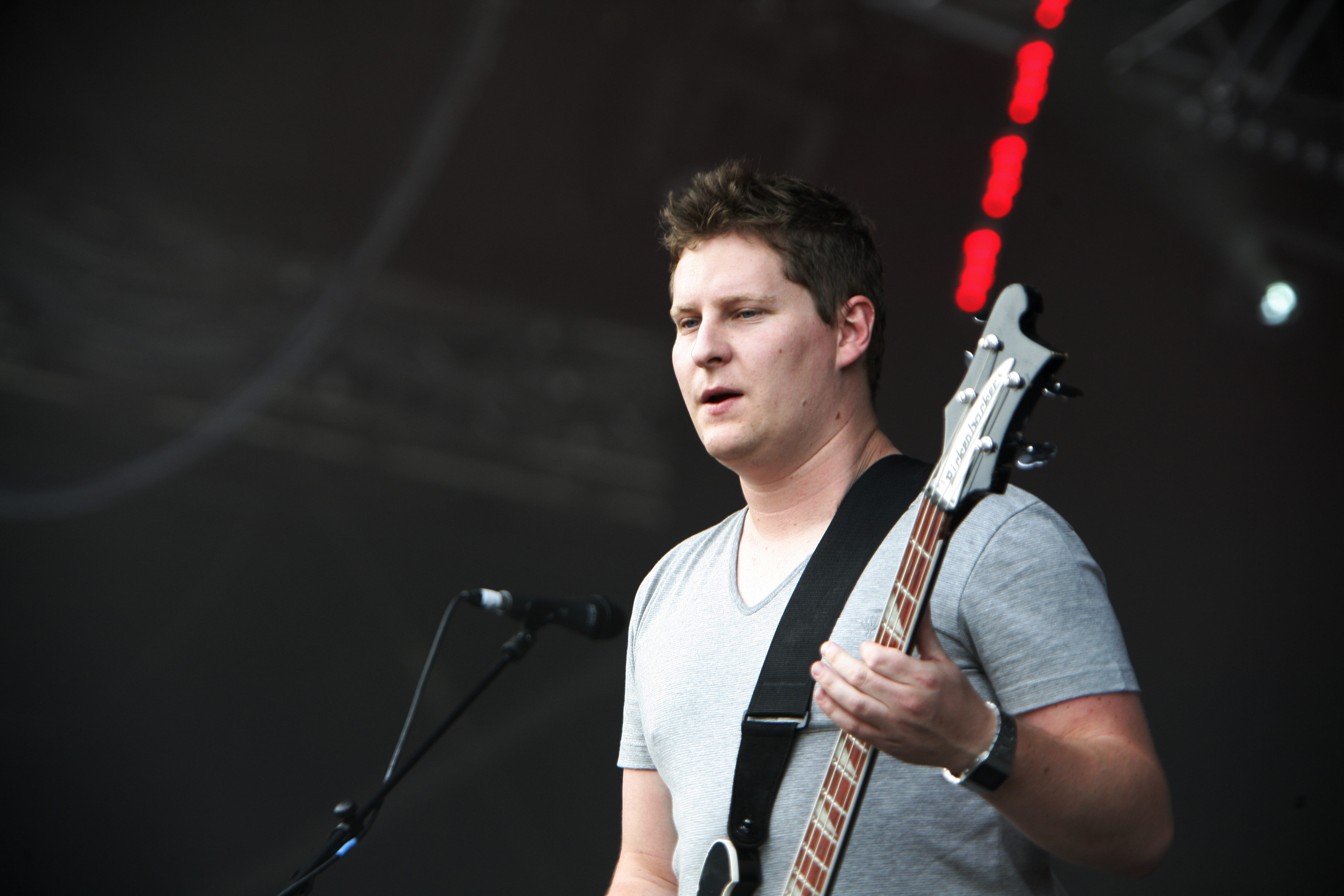
- Leetch at the Eurockéennes 2007

Background information
- Born: Russell Jonathan Leetch; 5 March 1982 (age 44)
- Origin: Solihull, England
- Genres: Indie rock
- Occupation: Musician
- Instruments: Bass guitar, vocals, piano
- Years active: 2004–present
- Label: Kitchenware

Russell Jonathan Leetch (born 5 March 1982) is an English bass guitarist who plays with Birmingham-based indie rock band Editors. He studied music technology at University of Staffordshire where he met his fellow Editors band members. He went to secondary school at Arden School, Knowle.

He used to work with bandmate Tom Smith in a call centre before the band got a record deal. His favourite bands are Radiohead and Spiritualized.

In February 2008, Leetch remixed The Hives single "T.H.E.H.I.V.E.S.", where it featured as a b-side on the single. He also directed the video to the Editors single "Bones" which was released in Europe.

He ran the 2008 New York City Marathon for charity. In April 2011 Leetch ran the London Marathon along with lead singer Tom Smith. They raised over £10,000 for Oxfam.

He supports Aston Villa F.C.
