= List of UK top-ten albums in 2007 =

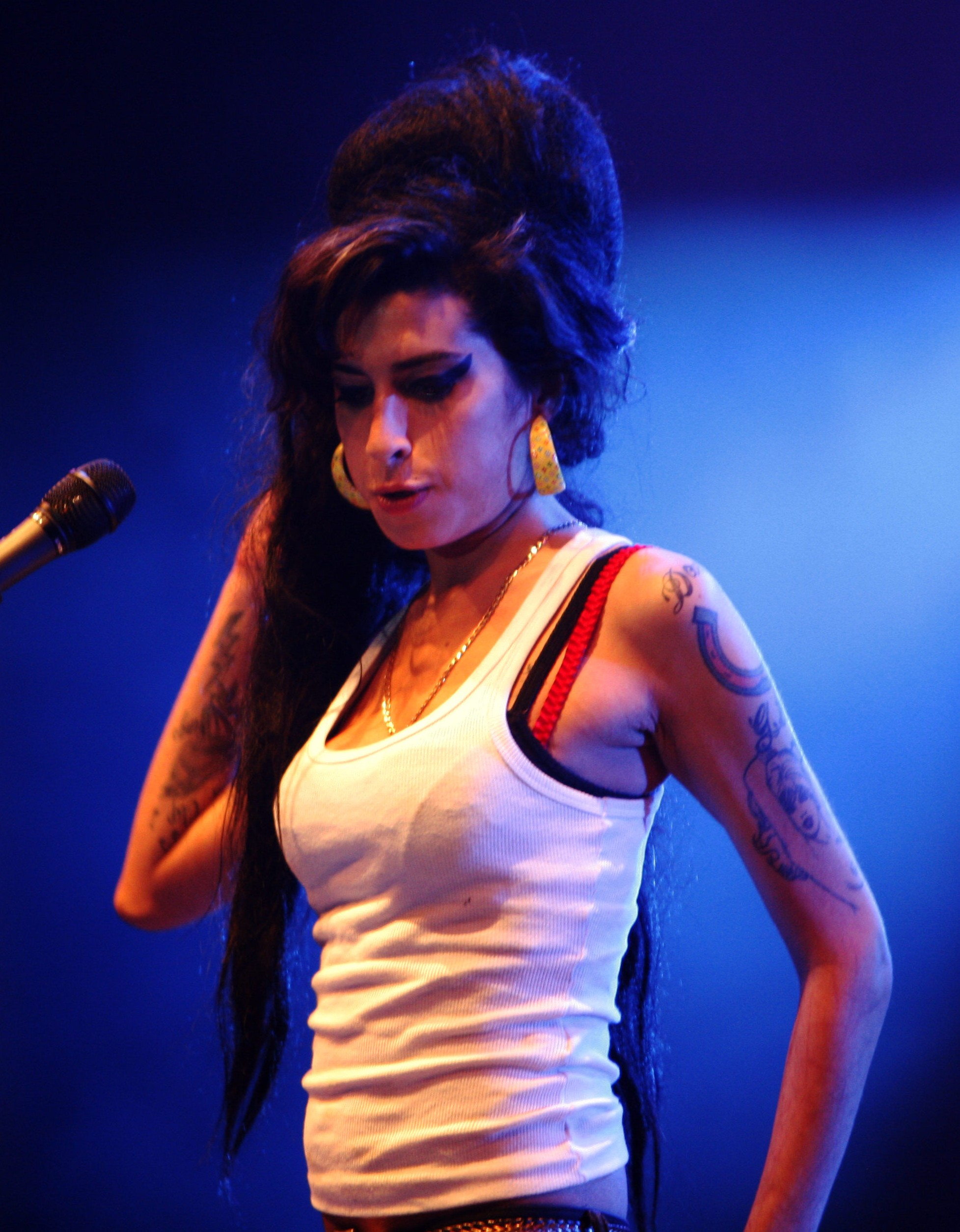
Amy Winehouse had the UK's best-selling album of 2007 with Back to Black, which first entered the top 10 in November 2006, eventually reaching number-one in January 2007. A deluxe edition of the album also entered the top 10 in December 2007 and later peaked at number-one in March 2008.

The UK Albums Chart is one of many music charts compiled by the Official Charts Company that calculates the best-selling albums of the week in the United Kingdom. Since 2004 the chart has been based on the sales of both physical albums and digital downloads. This list shows albums that peaked in the Top 10 of the UK Albums Chart during 2007, as well as albums which peaked in 2006 and 2008 but were in the top 10 in 2007. The entry date is when the album appeared in the top 10 for the first time (week ending, as published by the Official Charts Company, which is six days after the chart is announced).

One-hundred and fifty-four albums were in the top ten this year. Eighteen albums from 2006 remained in the top 10 for several weeks at the beginning of the year, while Back to Black: Deluxe Edition by Amy Winehouse, Raising Sand by Robert Plant & Alison Krauss and This Is the Life by Amy Macdonald were both released in 2007 but did not reach their peak until 2008. Back to Black by Amy Winehouse and Loose by Nelly Furtado were the albums from 2006 to reach their peak in 2007. Seven artist scored multiple entries in the top 10 in 2007. Fall Out Boy, Leona Lewis, Mark Ronson, Ne-Yo and Timbaland were among the many artists who achieved their first UK charting top 10 album in 2007.

The 2006 Christmas number-one album, Beautiful World by Take That, remained at the top spot for the first two weeks of 2007. The first new number-one album of the year was Back to Black by Amy Winehouse. Overall, thirty-three different albums peaked at number-one in 2007, with thirty-three unique artists hitting that position.

== Background ==
=== Multiple entries ===
One-hundred and fifty-four albums charted in the top 10 in 2007, with one-hundred and thirty-six albums reaching their peak this year (including ...Hits, Love Songs: A Compilation… Old and New, Never Forget – The Ultimate Collection and The Best of The Proclaimers, which charted in previous years but reached a peak on their latest chart run).

Six artists scored multiple entries in the top 10 in 2007. Phil Collins had three top 10 albums, while Amy Winehouse, The Killers, Kylie Minogue, Take That and Westlife were the acts who had two top 10 albums this year. Kylie Minogue and Michael Bublé's two entries were both released this year, with ...Hits (1998) and Love Songs: A Compilation… Old and New (2004) by Phil Collins and Never Forget – The Ultimate Collection (2005) by Take That returning after making the top ten before.

=== Chart debuts ===
Forty-two artists achieved their first top 10 album in 2007 as a lead artist.

The following table (collapsed on desktop site) does not include acts who had previously charted as part of a group and secured their first top 10 solo album, or featured appearances on compilations or other artists recordings.

Artist	Number of top 10s	First entry	Chart position	Other entries
The View	1	Hats Off to the Buskers	1	—
The Good, the Bad & the Queen	1	The Good, the Bad & the Queen	2	—
Tony Allen	1	The Good, the Bad & the Queen	2	—
Klaxons	1	Myths of the Near Future	2	—
Jamie T	1	Panic Prevention	4	—
Just Jack	1	Overtones	6	—
Mika	1	Life in Cartoon Motion	1	—
Fall Out Boy	1	Infinity on High	3	—
The Fray	1	How to Save a Life	3	—
Arcade Fire	1	Neon Bible	2	—
Cascada	1	Everytime We Touch: The Album	2	—
Dolly Parton	1	The Very Best of Dolly Parton	8	—
Ray Quinn	1	Doing It My Way	1	—
Ben Mills	1	Picture of You	3	—
Enter Shikari	1	Take to the Skies	4	—
Maxïmo Park	1	Our Earthly Pleasures	2	—
Timbaland	1	Timbaland Presents: Shock Value	2	—
Mark Ronson	1	Version	2	—
Ne-Yo	1	Because of You	6	—
Rufus Wainwright	1	Release the Stars	2	—
Funeral for a Friend	1	Tales Don't Tell Themselves	3	—
The Pigeon Detectives	1	Wait for Me	3	—
Biffy Clyro	1	Puzzle	2	—
The Twang	1	Love It When I Feel Like This	3	—
Calvin Harris	1	I Created Disco	8	—
The Enemy	1	We'll Live and Die in These Towns	1	—
Interpol	1	Our Love to Admire	2	—
Cherry Ghost	1	Thirst for Romance	7	—
Paul Potts	1	One Chance	1	—
Amy Macdonald	1	This Is the Life	1	—
Newton Faulkner	1	Hand Built by Robots	1	—
Kate Nash	1	Made of Bricks	1	—
Plain White T's	1	Every Second Counts	3	—
Sean Kingston	1	Sean Kingston	8	—
Ultrabeat	1	Ultrabeat: The Album	8	—
Reverend and the Makers	1	The State of Things	5	—
RyanDan	1	RyanDan	7	—
Jack Peñate	1	Matinée	7	—
The Hoosiers	1	The Trick to Life	1	—
Alison Krauss	1	Raising Sand	2	—
Mary Duff	1	Together Again	6	—
Leona Lewis	1	Spirit	1	—

Notes

Damon Albarn, Tony Allen, Paul Simonon and Simon Tong were all part of an unnamed supergroup which was penned as The Good, the Bad & the Queen on the album cover. Allen was the only member without a top 10 album before this point - Albarn had previous album success with Blur and Gorillaz, Simonon was bassist with The Clash while Tong featured in the group The Verve.

Mutya Buena left Sugababes in 2005 after three top 10 studio albums and a number 3 greatest hits album. Her debut solo effort, Real Girl, went straight in at number ten. Richard Hawley saw the first of his solo albums reach the top 10 in 2007, however he was part of the line-up of Pulp for their 2001 album We Love Life which peaked at the number 6 spot.

The Traveling Wilburys consisted of four notable singers with decades of success behind them - George Harrison (The Beatles), Tom Petty (Tom Petty and the Heartbreakers), Jeff Lynne (ELO) and Bob Dylan. The Traveling Wilburys Collection was a boxset of their two studio albums (Traveling Wilburys Vol. 1 and Traveling Wilburys Vol. 3), neither of which reached the top ten on their first release in 1988 and 1990 respectively.

=== Best-selling albums ===
Amy Winehouse had the best-selling album of the year with Back to Black. The album spent fifty-four weeks in the top 10 (including three weeks at number one), sold over 1.586 million copies and was certified 6× platinum by the BPI. Spirit by Leona Lewis came in second place. Mika's Life in Cartoon Motion, Beautiful World from Take That and Back Home by Westlife made up the top five. Albums by Eagles, Kaiser Chiefs, Arctic Monkeys, Timbaland and Rihanna were also in the top ten best-selling albums of the year.

== Top-ten albums ==
Key

Symbol	Meaning
‡	Album peaked in 2006 but still in chart in 2007.
♦	Album released in 2007 but peaked in 2008.
(#)	Year-end top-ten album position and rank
Entered	The date that the album first appeared in the chart.
Peak	Highest position that the album reached in the UK Albums Chart.

Entered (week ending)	Weeks in top 10	Album	Artist	Peak	Peak reached (week ending)	Weeks at peak
Albums in 2006
15 April 2006	7	I'm Not Dead ‡	Pink	3	15 April 2006	1
13 May 2006	35	Eyes Open ‡	Snow Patrol	1	13 May 2006	3
24 June 2006	9	Under the Iron Sea ‡	Keane	1	24 June 2006	2
24 June 2006	18	Loose	Nelly Furtado	4	21 April 2007	1
29 July 2006	23	Razorlight ‡	Razorlight	1	29 July 2006	2
29 July 2006	12	Alright, Still ‡	Lily Allen	2	29 July 2006	1
29 July 2006	15	These Streets ‡	Paolo Nutini	3	29 July 2006	1
12 August 2006	17	Undiscovered ‡	James Morrison	1	12 August 2006	2
16 September 2006	2	B'Day ‡	Beyoncé	3	16 September 2006	1
23 September 2006	11	Costello Music ‡	The Fratellis	2	23 September 2006	3
14 October 2006	8	Sam's Town ‡	The Killers	1	14 October 2006	3
11 November 2006	54	Back to Black (#1)	Amy Winehouse	1	20 January 2007	3
25 November 2006	7	Twenty Five ‡	George Michael	1	25 November 2006	1
2 December 2006	6	The Love Album ‡	Westlife	1	2 December 2006	1
2 December 2006	8	Stop the Clocks ‡	Oasis	2	2 December 2006	4
2 December 2006	9	Love ‡	The Beatles	3	2 December 2006	1
2 December 2006	6	U218 Singles ‡	U2	4	2 December 2006	1
9 December 2006	28	Beautiful World ‡ (#4)	Take That	1	9 December 2006	8
Albums in 2007
20 January 2007	2	Showgirl: Homecoming Live	Kylie Minogue	7	20 January 2007	1
3 February 2007	3	Hats Off to the Buskers	The View	1	3 February 2007	1
3 February 2007	1	The Good, the Bad & the Queen	The Good, the Bad & the Queen	2	3 February 2007	1
10 February 2007	3	Not Too Late	Norah Jones	1	10 February 2007	1
10 February 2007	2	Myths of the Near Future	Klaxons	2	10 February 2007	1
10 February 2007	2	Panic Prevention	Jamie T	4	10 February 2007	1
10 February 2007	1	Overtones	Just Jack	6	10 February 2007	1
10 February 2007	1	The Confessions Tour	Madonna	7	10 February 2007	1
17 February 2007	32	Life in Cartoon Motion (#3)	Mika	1	17 February 2007	2
17 February 2007	2	A Weekend in the City	Bloc Party	2	17 February 2007	1
17 February 2007	2	Infinity on High	Fall Out Boy	3	17 February 2007	1
24 February 2007	1	Love Songs: A Compilation... Old and New	Phil Collins	7	24 February 2007	1
3 March 2007	3	How to Save a Life	The Fray	4	3 March 2007	1
10 March 2007	8	Yours Truly, Angry Mob (#7)	Kaiser Chiefs	1	10 March 2007	2
10 March 2007	1	Treasure	Hayley Westenra	9	10 March 2007	1
17 March 2007	1	Neon Bible	Arcade Fire	2	17 March 2007	1
17 March 2007	3	That's Life	Russell Watson	4	17 March 2007	1
17 March 2007	1	Dylanesque	Bryan Ferry	5	17 March 2007	1
17 March 2007	11	Everytime We Touch: The Album	Cascada	2	21 April 2007	1
17 March 2007	2	Love Songs of the 70s	Donny Osmond	7	17 March 2007	2
17 March 2007	3	The Very Best of Dolly Parton	Dolly Parton	8	24 March 2007	2
24 March 2007	2	Doing It My Way	Ray Quinn	1	24 March 2007	1
24 March 2007	1	Picture of You	Ben Mills	3	24 March 2007	1
24 March 2007	2	Stay	Simply Red	4	24 March 2007	1
31 March 2007	1	Take to the Skies	Enter Shikari	4	31 March 2007	1
7 April 2007	2	Rocket Man: The Definitive Hits	Elton John	2	7 April 2007	1
14 April 2007	9	Because of the Times	Kings of Leon	1	14 April 2007	2
14 April 2007	2	Our Earthly Pleasures	Maxïmo Park	2	14 April 2007	1
14 April 2007	2	The Best of The Proclaimers	The Proclaimers	5	14 April 2007	2
14 April 2007	11	Timbaland Presents: Shock Value (#9)	Timbaland	2	4 August 2007	1
28 April 2007	3	The Best Damn Thing	Avril Lavigne	1	28 April 2007	1
28 April 2007	13	Version	Mark Ronson	2	28 April 2007	2
28 April 2007	1	Year Zero	Nine Inch Nails	6	28 April 2007	1
5 May 2007	7	Favourite Worst Nightmare (#8)	Arctic Monkeys	1	5 May 2007	3
12 May 2007	12	Call Me Irresponsible	Michael Bublé	2	12 May 2007	1
12 May 2007	1	Because of You	Ne-Yo	6	12 May 2007	1
12 May 2007	1	N.B.	Natasha Bedingfield	9	12 May 2007	1
19 May 2007	2	Send Away the Tigers	Manic Street Preachers	2	19 May 2007	1
19 May 2007	2	The Boy with No Name	Travis	4	19 May 2007	1
19 May 2007	1	Volta	Björk	7	19 May 2007	1
19 May 2007	1	Music City Soul	Beverley Knight	8	19 May 2007	1
19 May 2007	1	Soundboy Rock	Groove Armada	10	19 May 2007	1
26 May 2007	4	Minutes to Midnight	Linkin Park	1	26 May 2007	1
26 May 2007	1	Release the Stars	Rufus Wainwright	2	26 May 2007	1
26 May 2007	1	Tales Don't Tell Themselves	Funeral for a Friend	3	26 May 2007	1
26 May 2007	1	Hymn for My Soul	Joe Cocker	9	26 May 2007	1
2 June 2007	3	It Won't Be Soon Before Long	Maroon 5	1	2 June 2007	2
2 June 2007	1	Trip the Light Fantastic	Sophie Ellis-Bextor	7	2 June 2007	1
2 June 2007	1	Black Rain	Ozzy Osbourne	8	2 June 2007	1
9 June 2007	3	Wait for Me	The Pigeon Detectives	3	9 June 2007	1
9 June 2007	1	Double Up	R. Kelly	10	9 June 2007	1
16 June 2007	27	Good Girl Gone Bad (#10)	Rihanna	1	16 June 2007	1
16 June 2007	1	Puzzle	Biffy Clyro	2	16 June 2007	1
16 June 2007	1	Love It When I Feel Like This	The Twang	3	16 June 2007	1
16 June 2007	2	Memory Almost Full	Paul McCartney	5	16 June 2007	1
16 June 2007	1	Maths + English	Dizzee Rascal	7	16 June 2007	1
16 June 2007	1	Eat Me, Drink Me	Marilyn Manson	8	16 June 2007	1
16 June 2007	1	Real Girl	Mutya Buena	10	16 June 2007	1
23 June 2007	8	The Traveling Wilburys Collection	The Traveling Wilburys	1	23 June 2007	1
23 June 2007	2	Lost Highway	Bon Jovi	2	23 June 2007	1
23 June 2007	3	The Police	The Police	3	23 June 2007	1
23 June 2007	2	Turn It On Again: The Hits	Genesis	5	23 June 2007	1
23 June 2007	1	Guitar Man	Hank Marvin	6	23 June 2007	1
23 June 2007	1	Era Vulgaris	Queens of the Stone Age	7	23 June 2007	1
23 June 2007	1	Then and Now	The Who	9	23 June 2007	1
30 June 2007	2	Icky Thump	The White Stripes	1	30 June 2007	1
30 June 2007	1	Insomniac	Enrique Iglesias	3	30 June 2007	1
30 June 2007	1	I Created Disco	Calvin Harris	8	30 June 2007	1
30 June 2007	6	Never Forget – The Ultimate Collection	Take That	5	14 July 2007	1
7 July 2007	3	An End Has a Start	Editors	1	7 July 2007	1
7 July 2007	2	My December	Kelly Clarkson	2	7 July 2007	1
7 July 2007	1	Get the Party Started	Shirley Bassey	6	7 July 2007	1
14 July 2007	2	We Are the Night	The Chemical Brothers	1	14 July 2007	1
14 July 2007	1	Time on Earth	Crowded House	3	14 July 2007	1
14 July 2007	1	Libertad	Velvet Revolver	6	14 July 2007	1
21 July 2007	3	We'll Live and Die in These Towns	The Enemy	1	21 July 2007	1
21 July 2007	1	Our Love to Admire	Interpol	2	21 July 2007	1
21 July 2007	1	Zeitgeist	The Smashing Pumpkins	4	21 July 2007	1
21 July 2007	1	Thirst for Romance	Cherry Ghost	7	21 July 2007	1
28 July 2007	5	One Chance	Paul Potts	1	28 July 2007	3
11 August 2007	14	This Is the Life ♦	Amy Macdonald	1	19 January 2008	1
11 August 2007	11	Hand Built by Robots	Newton Faulkner	1	1 September 2007	2
11 August 2007	3	Ultimate Prince	Prince	6	11 August 2007	1
18 August 2007	5	Made of Bricks	Kate Nash	1	18 August 2007	1
18 August 2007	1	Roots & Echoes	The Coral	8	25 August 2007	1
25 August 2007	4	The King	Elvis Presley	1	25 August 2007	1
1 September 2007	1	Lady's Bridge	Richard Hawley	6	1 September 2007	1
15 September 2007	2	Once Upon a Time in the West	Hard-Fi	1	15 September 2007	1
15 September 2007	4	Every Second Counts	Plain White T's	3	15 September 2007	1
15 September 2007	1	Beyond the Neighbourhood	Athlete	5	15 September 2007	1
15 September 2007	1	Sean Kingston	Sean Kingston	8	15 September 2007	1
22 September 2007	4	Graduation	Kanye West	1	22 September 2007	1
22 September 2007	3	Curtis	50 Cent	2	22 September 2007	1
22 September 2007	3	Drastic Fantastic	KT Tunstall	3	22 September 2007	1
22 September 2007	1	Glorious: The Singles 97–07	Natalie Imbruglia	5	22 September 2007	1
22 September 2007	1	Ultrabeat: The Album	Ultrabeat	8	22 September 2007	1
29 September 2007	5	All the Lost Souls	James Blunt	1	29 September 2007	1
29 September 2007	1	The State of Things	Reverend and the Makers	5	29 September 2007	1
29 September 2007	1	The Ultimate Collection	Luciano Pavarotti	8	29 September 2007	1
29 September 2007	1	Kill to Get Crimson	Mark Knopfler	9	29 September 2007	1
29 September 2007	6	...Hits	Phil Collins	7	27 October 2007	1
6 October 2007	5	Echoes, Silence, Patience & Grace	Foo Fighters	1	6 October 2007	1
6 October 2007	1	The World Is Yours	Ian Brown	4	6 October 2007	1
6 October 2007	1	RyanDan	RyanDan	7	6 October 2007	1
13 October 2007	3	Magic	Bruce Springsteen	1	13 October 2007	1
13 October 2007	4	Pictures	Katie Melua	2	13 October 2007	1
13 October 2007	1	Shotter's Nation	Babyshambles	5	13 October 2007	1
13 October 2007	1	Songs of Mass Destruction	Annie Lennox	7	13 October 2007	1
13 October 2007	1	Dylan	Bob Dylan	10	13 October 2007	1
20 October 2007	4	Change	Sugababes	1	20 October 2007	1
20 October 2007	3	Complete Clapton	Eric Clapton	2	20 October 2007	1
20 October 2007	1	Matinée	Jack Peñate	7	20 October 2007	1
20 October 2007	1	Running Free	Ali Campbell	9	20 October 2007	1
27 October 2007	2	Pull the Pin	Stereophonics	1	27 October 2007	1
27 October 2007	1	Best of Friends	Jools Holland	9	27 October 2007	1
3 November 2007	7	The Trick to Life	The Hoosiers	1	3 November 2007	1
3 November 2007	2	Still on Top – The Greatest Hits	Van Morrison	2	3 November 2007	1
10 November 2007	8	Long Road Out of Eden (#6)	Eagles	1	10 November 2007	1
10 November 2007	1	Blackout	Britney Spears	2	10 November 2007	1
10 November 2007	7	Raising Sand ♦	Robert Plant & Alison Krauss	2	2 February 2008	1
10 November 2007	5	The Ultimate Collection	Whitney Houston	3	17 November 2007	1
10 November 2007	1	Together Again	Daniel O'Donnell & Mary Duff	6	10 November 2007	1
17 November 2007	8	Back Home (#5)	Westlife	1	17 November 2007	1
17 November 2007	1	All the Greatest Hits	McFly	4	17 November 2007	1
17 November 2007	1	Motown: A Journey Through Hitsville USA	Boyz II Men	8	17 November 2007	1
24 November 2007	26	Spirit (#2)	Leona Lewis	1	24 November 2007	8
24 November 2007	2	Greatest Hits	Spice Girls	2	24 November 2007	1
24 November 2007	7	Mothership	Led Zeppelin	4	24 November 2007	2
24 November 2007	2	Taking Chances	Celine Dion	5	24 November 2007	1
24 November 2007	1	Sawdust	The Killers	7	24 November 2007	1
24 November 2007	7	The Best of Andrea Bocelli: Vivere	Andrea Bocelli	4	29 December 2007	1
1 December 2007	2	Rejoice	Katherine Jenkins	3	1 December 2007	1
1 December 2007	1	Tangled Up	Girls Aloud	4	1 December 2007	1
8 December 2007	5	Breathless	Shayne Ward	2	8 December 2007	1
8 December 2007	2	X	Kylie Minogue	4	8 December 2007	1
29 December 2007	12	Back to Black: The Deluxe Edition ♦	Amy Winehouse	1	8 March 2008	1

== Entries by artist ==
The following table shows artists who achieved two or more top 10 entries in 2007, including albums that reached their peak in 2006. The figures only include main artists, with featured artists and appearances on compilation albums not counted individually for each artist. The total number of weeks an artist spent in the top ten in 2007 is also shown.

Entries	Artist	Weeks	Albums
3	Phil Collins	9	...Hits, Love Songs: A Compilation… Old and New, Turn It On Again: The Hits
2	Amy Winehouse	50	Back to Black, Back to Black: The Deluxe Edition
2	The Killers	5	Sam's Town, Sawdust,
2	Kylie Minogue	4	Showgirl: Homecoming Live, X
2	Take That	25	Beautiful World, Never Forget – The Ultimate Collection
2	Westlife	8	Back Home, The Love Album

== Notes ==
- This Is the Life reached its peak of number-one on 19 January 2008 (week ending).
- Raising Sand reached its peak of number two on 2 February 2008 (week ending).
- Back to Black: Deluxe Edition reached its peak of number-one on 8 March 2008 (week ending).
- I'm Not Dead re-entered the top 10 at number 6 on 6 January 2007 (week ending) for 2 weeks.
- Under the Iron Sea re-entered the top 10 at number 8 on 3 February 2007 (week ending) for 2 weeks.
- Loose re-entered the top 10 at number 9 on 3 March 2007 (week ending) for 3 weeks, at number 6 on 31 March 2007 (week ending) for 7 weeks and at number 7 on 14 July 2007 (week ending) for 3 weeks.
- Razorlight re-entered the top 10 at number 9 on 24 February 2007 (week ending).
- Alright, Still re-entered the top 10 at number 6 on 27 January 2007 (week ending) for 2 weeks and at number 7 on 3 March 2007 (week ending) for 2 weeks.
- These Streets re-entered the top 10 at number 9 on 13 January 2007 (week ending) for 4 weeks and at number 10 on 1 September 2007 (week ending) for 2 weeks.
- Undiscovered re-entered the top 10 at number 8 on 6 January 2007 (week ending) for 9 weeks.
- FutureSex/LoveSounds re-entered the top 10 at number 9 on 31 March 2007 (week ending) for 2 weeks and at number 7 on 21 April 2007 (week ending) for 3 weeks.
- Costello Music re-entered the top 10 at number 6 on 13 January 2007 (week ending) for 4 weeks and at number 10 on 3 March 2007 (week ending).
- Sam's Town re-entered the top 10 at number 6 on 3 March 2007 (week ending) for 3 weeks and at number 9 on 7 July 2007 (week ending).
- Back to Black re-entered the top 10 at number 2 on 13 January 2007 (week ending) for 28 weeks, at number 8 on 28 July 2007 (week ending) for 18 weeks and at number 9 on 8 December 2007 (week ending) for 7 weeks.
- Beautiful World re-entered the top 10 at number 5 on 24 February 2007 (week ending) for 10 weeks, at number 9 on 24 November 2007 (week ending) for 2 weeks and at number 10 on 15 December 2007 (week ending) for 8 weeks.
- The Good, the Bad & the Queen was recorded by an unnamed supergroup consisting of Damon Albarn, Tony Allen, Paul Simonon and Simon Tong, although the album cover credits it to a group of the same name.
- Life in Cartoon Motion re-entered the top 10 at number 10 on 7 April 2007 (week ending), at number 8 on 21 April 2007 (week ending) for 8 weeks, at number 4 on 28 July 2007 (week ending) for 9 weeks, at number 10 on 17 November 2007 (week ending), at number 9 on 5 January 2008 (week ending) for 5 weeks and at number 9 on 23 February 2008 (week ending) for 4 weeks.
- Love Songs: A Compilation… Old and New originally peaked at number 9 upon its initial release in 2004.
- How to Save a Life re-entered the top 10 at number 9 on 7 April 2007 (week ending).
- Yours Truly, Angry Mob re-entered the top 10 at number 10 on 2 June 2007 (week ending) for 2 weeks.
- Everytime We Touch - The Album re-entered the top 10 at number 9 on 2 June 2007 (week ending) for 2 weeks.
- Because of the Times re-entered the top 10 at number 10 on 21 July 2007 (week ending) for 5 weeks.
- The Best of The Proclaimers originally peaked outside the top ten at number 30 upon its initial release in 2002.
- Timbaland Presents: Shock Value re-entered the top 10 at number 5 on 28 July 2007 (week ending) for 7 weeks, at number 9 on 17 November 2007 (week ending) and at number 10 on 12 January 2008 (week ending).
- Version re-entered the top 10 at number 7 on 4 August 2007 (week ending) for 2 weeks, at number 8 on 27 October 2007 (week ending) for 3 weeks and at number 4 on 1 March 2008 (week ending) for 4 weeks.
- B'Day re-entered the top 10 at number 8 on 5 May 2007 (week ending).
- Call Me Irresponsible has two separate entries in the UK Albums Chart, one as a standard edition, and one as a special edition. Combining both editions, the album spent 12 non-consecutive weeks in the UK top 10 altogether. The special edition entered the top 10 at number 3 on 22 December 2007 (week ending), re-entered at number 6 on 23 February 2008 (week ending) and re-entered at number 4 on 8 March 2008 (week ending).
- Wait for Me re-entered the top 10 at number 9 on 1 September 2007 (week ending) for 2 weeks.
- Never Forget – The Ultimate Collection originally peaked at number 2 upon its initial release in 2005.
- Good Girl Gone Bad re-entered the top 10 at number 10 on 4 August 2007 (week ending), at number 10 on 25 August 2007 (week ending), at number 6 on 8 September 2007 (week ending) for 2 weeks, at number 9 on 26 January 2008 (week ending) for 4 weeks, at number 10 on 1 March 2008 (week ending), at number 10 on 28 June 2008 (week ending), at number 9 on 12 July 2008 (week ending) for 2 weeks, at number 9 on 16 August 2008 (week ending) for 3 weeks and at number 5 on 13 September 2008 (week ending) for 7 weeks.
- This Is the Life re-entered the top 10 at number 6 on 12 January 2008 (week ending) for 7 weeks and at number 10 on 15 March 2008 (week ending) for 2 weeks.
- Hand Built by Robots re-entered the top 10 at number 7 on 19 January 2008 (week ending) for 4 weeks.
- All the Lost Souls re-entered the top 10 at number 8 on 12 April 2008 (week ending).
- ...Hits originally peaked at number-one upon its initial release in 1998.
- The Trick to Life re-entered the top 10 at number 8 on 12 January 2008 (week ending) and at number 8 on 26 January 2008 (week ending) for 3 weeks.
- Raising Sand re-entered the top 10 at number 6 on 19 January 2008 (week ending) for 5 weeks.
- The Ultimate Collection (Whitney Houston) re-entered the top 10 at number 10 on 8 December 2007 (week ending) for 3 weeks.
- Spirit re-entered the top 10 at number 4 on 22 March 2008 (week ending) for 8 weeks and at number-one on 29 November 2008 (week ending) for 9 weeks.
- Back to Black: Deluxe Edition re-entered the top 10 at number 3 on 1 March 2008 (week ending) for 8 weeks, at number 10 on 8 May 2008 (week ending) and at number 7 on 12 July 2008 (week ending) for 2 weeks.
- Figure includes a top 10 album with the group Genesis.
- Figure includes album that peaked in 2006.

== See also ==
- 2007 in British music
- List of number-one albums from the 2000s (UK)
