= Henrik Janson =

Swedish musician

Henrik John Janson
- Birth name: Henrik John Janson
- Born: 11 March 1961 (age 64)
- Origin: Karlstad, Sweden
- Genres: Pop, classical crossover, jazz, funk, R&B
- Occupation(s): Music arranger, guitarist, producer, songwriter
- Instrument(s): Guitar, keyboards, cello, bass
- Years active: 1980–present

Henrik Janson (born 11 March 1961) is a Swedish music arranger, guitarist, record producer and songwriter. Founding a band at thirteen, in 1974, Janson today works with both domestic and international artists.

== Career ==
=== Early years ===
Janson was born and raised in Hammarö, in the province of Värmland, Sweden. At the age of nine, he began taking cello lessons while three years later starting to learn how to play the guitar, today his main instrument. Before entering high school, where he studied music, Janson already had founded his own jazz-rock band, Mantra, in which he played the guitar and wrote all the music. The band was dissolved in 1981 when Janson decided to move to Stockholm, where he lives today.

Settled in the capital, Janson became a coveted studio musician also frequently being engaged as a record producer and music arranger. In addition he worked as a guitarist on tours with artists such as Roxette, Michael Ruff Band, Nils Landgren Funk Unit, Tomas Ledin and Ratata.

In 1989, Janson recorded and released a solo album, Livingroom, for which he was nominated a Swedish Grammis Award, equivalent to the Grammy in the United States.

=== Strings and orchestra arranger ===
In 1992, Janson teamed up with his brother Ulf Janson starting to write music arrangements for orchestras, both also working as conductors. Through the years they have collaborated with the London Royal Philharmonic Orchestra, the City of Prague Philharmonic Orchestra and the Royal Stockholm Philharmonic Orchestra.

The opera crossover quartet Il Divo was formed by the music manager Simon Cowell in 2003. Their self-titled debut album was released in November the following year and went straight to number one in the UK and in seven other countries. Henrik and Ulf Janson arranged the orchestra and worked as conductors on parts of the album, which they also did on the group’s following two UK number one studio albums Ancora and Siempre. On each three records, Henrik also was engaged as a guitarist.

In June 2007, British tenor Paul Potts was crowned winner of the first season of ITV's talent show Britain's Got Talent. Potts' debut album One Chance, including Janson's arrangements for orchestra which the brothers also conducted, came out a month later. Just like Il Divo's first album, it went to number one in the UK, as well as in eight other countries. Two years later, in 2009, they returned working with Potts on his sophomore album Passione.

String arrangements by Janson are also found on seven UK top 40 number one songs:

- "Hallelujah" with Alexandra Burke, the 2008 X Factor winner
- "That's My Goal" with Shayne Ward, the 2005 X Factor winner
- "Evergreen" with Will Young, the 2002 Pop Idol winner
- "Anyone of Us (Stupid Mistake)" with Gareth Gates, the 2002 Pop Idol runner-up
- "If I Let You Go", "Fool Again" and "My Love", all with Westlife, released in 1999-2000

Other songs including string arrangements by Janson are "Fuckin' Perfect" and "I Don't Believe You" (both with Pink), "Toxic" (Britney Spears), "The Call" and "Show Me the Meaning of Being Lonely" (both with the Backstreet Boys).

=== Songwriting ===
Alongside arranging and producing music, Janson also writes songs within different genres, from pop and jazz to classical crossover, often in collaboration with other songwriters.

Songs co-written by Janson include "You're Out of My Life" (Darin), "Don't Tell Me You're Sorry" (S Club 8), "Fools" (Rachel Stevens), "Come Primavera" (Il Divo), "What You Believe In" (Take That), "Like Suicide" (Christian Walz), "The Queen" (Velvet) and "Discoteque" (Elin Lanto). Janson also has contributed with songs on Swedish artist Lisa Nilsson's albums Små Rum and Viva and working as a guitarist on her albums Himlen runt hörnet and Till Morelia.

=== Collaborations ===
Through the years, Janson has collaborated with artists such as Aqua, Backstreet Boys, Benny Andersson, Bernard Purdie, Brenda Russell, Britney Spears, Céline Dion, Cody Karey, Eddie Harris, Emilia Mitiku, Il Divo, Katherine Jenkins, Kelly Rowland, Maceo Parker, Max Martin, Michael Bolton, Michael Ruff, Nils Landgren, Paul Potts, Peter Jöback, Pink, Randy Brecker, Robyn, Ronan Keating, Roxette, Take That, the Tenors, Toots Thielemans, Westlife and Arch Enemy.

=== Recent work ===
On 5 December 2013, Céline Dion released the song "Breakaway" as a single in the UK. Her album, Loved Me Back to Life, also includes "Somebody Loves Somebody", both songs with string arrangements co-written by Janson.

The annual Nobel Prize Awards in 2013 were presented in Stockholm on 10 December. During the following banquet held at the Stockholm City Hall, the classical crossover composition "Anthem for All Mankind", with music written and produced by Janson for the event, was performed by the Swedish opera trio Divine.

== Personal life ==
Janson was in a relationship with Søs Fenger, a Danish vocalist, though they have since separated. The couple had a son, August Fenger Janson, who performs under the name Eloq as a DJ and music producer.
