= 2007 in British music charts =

This is a summary of the year 2007 in British music. It was the first year of digital downloads being fully integrated into the charts, leading to many songs not given physical releases to enter the chart on download sales alone. Leona Lewis had the most successful single of the year with "Bleeding Love", which achieved sales of 787,652 copies. Her album Spirit became the fastest-selling debut album of all time in the UK. Rihanna spent ten weeks at number one with "Umbrella", the longest stay for any artist at number 1 for thirteen years and the second best selling single of the year, and Amy Winehouse had the biggest selling album of the year with Back to Black.

== Summary ==
=== January ===
2007 began with the introduction of new chart rules meaning that all songs legally downloaded over the internet can count towards chart positions, whether or not a "physical" version of a song is available to purchase. Although Leona Lewis stayed at number one in her first week, the change was felt further down the charts with songs such as "Crazy" by Gnarls Barkley, "Maneater" by Nelly Furtado, "You Don't Know" by Eminem all returning to the charts on downloads alone. Also, as a result of downloads being eligible at any time, JoJo charted at number twenty-two with "Too Little Too Late", two weeks before physical release. Since then, various other songs have charted long before their CD release, including The Fray, whose "How to Save a Life" charted at number 29 on 21 January, two months before the CD's release. As a result, the CD release date was brought forward by a month.

Mika topped the singles chart on 21 January to knock Leona Lewis off the top with the song "Grace Kelly" with sales around 30,000, to become only the second song (after Gnarls Barkley's "Crazy") to go to #1 exclusively via download sales. Just Jack climbed to number two with "Starz in Their Eyes" and The View at three with "Same Jeans". Chris Moyles, BBC Radio 1 Breakfast DJ, decided to test the new chart rules by selecting a random track for the public to download (legally) to see if it would chart. The track was "Honey to the Bee" by Billie and it reached number 17 on 21 January on downloads alone.

=== March ===
Kaiser Chiefs claimed their first #1 album with Yours Truly, Angry Mob, which stayed at the top for two weeks despite a challenge by Arcade Fire's second album Neon Bible. Take That claimed their 10th #1 single with "Shine", replaced two weeks later by Sugababes vs. Girls Aloud, who collaborated on the official Comic Relief single "Walk This Way". The single earned Sugababes their fifth #1 single, and Girls Aloud their third. Ray Quinn, who came second in the third series of The X Factor, went to #1 in the album charts with his album of swing covers, Doing It My Way. German dance group Cascada also released their first album, Everytime We Touch, which peaked at #2 and ended up being the UK's 22nd best selling album of the year.

=== April ===
Scottish duo The Proclaimers managed to score three weeks at the top of the singles chart with the unofficial Comic Relief single, "I'm Gonna Be (500 Miles)" with Brian Potter and Andy Pipkin, selling over 200,000 copies to date. American rock band Kings of Leon recorded their first #1 album in the UK with their third album, Because of the Times. American producer Timbaland went to #1 with "Give It to Me", which was also at the top at the same time in the States. "Give It to Me" was an all-star collaboration with both Nelly Furtado and Justin Timberlake. Another all-star collaboration replaced Timbaland at #1, with both Beyoncé and Shakira climbing to the top with "Beautiful Liar", which gave both Beyoncé and Shakira their second UK #1 within a year and also Beyoncé her third #1 as a solo artist. The Arctic Monkeys' first single from their second album Favourite Worst Nightmare, "Brianstorm", reached #2, behind Beyonce and Shakira's #1 hit.

Avril Lavigne charted with The Best Damn Thing giving her a third UK #1 album. It is only the second time that a female solo artist has ever scored three #1's in the UK with her first three albums, following Let Go (#1 in 2003) and Under My Skin (#1 in 2004).

=== May ===
McFly gained their seventh #1 single with "Baby's Coming Back/Transylvania", but the song fell to #20 and then #39 the following week, tying the record for the biggest fall from #1 with Elvis Presley. Rihanna went to #1 for the first time with "Umbrella" — a collaboration with Jay-Z — and would remain on top for the rest of the month. Linkin Park and Maroon 5 both got #1 albums in May, with Minutes to Midnight and It Won't Be Soon Before Long respectively.

=== June ===
The month of June began with Rihanna being at the #1 spot for both the singles and download chart. Her third album Good Girl Gone Bad also made it to the top in the albums chart. The White Stripes reached #2 with their single "Icky Thump". The 7" format of the single went on to become the UK's biggest selling 7" single in twenty years, which was partly due to a tie in with XL Records and NME (who had given away a free foldout 7" of new song "Rag and Bone", with space to include the "Icky Thump" 7"). The Traveling Wilburys went to #1 for the first time with The Traveling Wilburys Collection, followed by The White Stripes with their sixth album Icky Thump. Britain's most successful girl group the Spice Girls reformed and announced a global tour and Greatest Hits album. Muse played a record, sold-out two night concert in Wembley Stadium on the 16th and 17th of this month. Paul McCartney released his album Memory Almost Full on the 5th.

=== July ===
Editors went to #1 for the first time with their second album An End Has a Start. They would be followed by #1 albums from The Chemical Brothers (We Are the Night), The Enemy (We'll Live and Die in these Towns) and Britain's Got Talent winner Paul Potts, whose album One Chance was the first since Maroon 5's It Won't Be Soon Before Long to spend more than one week at #1.

On 10 July, German Eurodance Group Cascada released their 3rd single Miracle. It entered at #57 and then went on to peak at #8, making it their 3rd consecutive top ten single.

On 22 July, Rihanna's "Umbrella" secured ten weeks at #1. In doing so, it overtook Gnarls Barkley's "Crazy" as the longest runner at #1 in the 21st Century and became one of the most successful R&B/Hip-Hop singles of all time. The title also cursed the British summertime which was one of the wettest in living memory.

After a massive ten weeks at #1, Rihanna was finally replaced by Timbaland's second #1 single of the year, "The Way I Are", featuring newcomers Keri Hilson and D.O.E., whilst Kate Nash stayed at #2 with her official debut single "Foundations".

=== August ===
The record for the shortest single to ever chart was broken, when Hans Zimmer's "Spider Pig", from The Simpsons Movie soundtrack, entered the chart at #24. The running time for the song is a mere 1:04.

Swedish singer Robyn earns her first UK top 40 #1, with the song "With Every Heartbeat". In the same week, Kate Nash made it to #1 in the albums chart with her debut album, Made of Bricks. Hip-Hop act Kanye West debuts at #3 in the singles chart with "Stronger" based on downloads alone, and then also in the same week being the #1 of the downloads chart. "Stronger" rose to #1 in the singles chart the following week and stayed there for 2 weeks.

Seventeen-year-old Sean Kingston makes his British chart debut at #2 in the chart on downloads alone with Beautiful Girls.

=== September ===
On 2 September, Sean Kingston moves one place up the chart from #2 and earns his first #1 with the single "Beautiful Girls", Sean believes that he was inspired by music from his hero Jay-Z. One week later Hard-Fi triumphantly return with their second album Once Upon a Time in the West reaching #1 on 9 September. On the day of release the band played at Virgin Megastore in Oxford Street where they signed copies of the album. During the evening of the same day, the band played an exclusive gig at Maida Vale Studios, London.

Girls Aloud returned to the charts with "Sexy! No, No, No..." which made it to #5, but fell 2 places to #7 the week after. They entered into the Guinness Book Of World Records, for having the most consecutive Top 10 hits in the UK for an all-female group.

In the Air Tonight by Phil Collins re-entered the chart at #17 after many years, due to its use in the new UK Cadburys Dairy Milk advert.

On 30 September, Radio 1 held a special UK Singles Chart edition for 40 years of Radio 1. Bruno Brookes and Mark Goodier, past presenters of the UK Singles Chart, played the biggest singles ever in the singles chart and showed highest stats from artists including Britney Spears, Gnarls Barkley, Will Young, Hear'Say, Bryan Adams, Rihanna and Eminem.

On this same day, Sugababes earned their sixth number one single with first single from their fifth studio album, "About You Now". Also, the Sugababes were the second artist (after Timbaland) to have two singles at number one in 2007.

At 36 seconds long, "The Ladies' Bras" by Jonny Trunk & Wisbey became the shortest ever single to enter the UK Singles Chart, charting at number 27 on 30 September, breaking the record just a few weeks after "Spider Pig".

=== October ===
Steve Hewitt, Placebo's drummer of 11 years, left the band as a result of "personal and musical differences...", as quoted on the website.

On 6 October the Sugababes managed to hold on to the top spot with "About You Now". Jennifer Lopez and The Stereophonics both made returns to the chart at numbers 11 and 12 with the singles "Do It Well" and "It Means Nothing" respectively.

Bruce Springsteen hit number one for the seventh time on the UK album charts with new album Magic.

In a controversial move, Radiohead released their new album "In Rainbows" online, and allowed their fans to download it for any set price they want from £0.00-£100. The Charlatans announce that they are to follow suit, by releasing their album for free from XFM's website in 2008. They release "You Cross My Path" as a free mp3 through the XFM site.

The Verve unleash their first new material for 10 years, a 14-minute demo known as "The Thaw Session" as a free MP3 through NME's website, for 1 week only.

On 21 October Britney Spears entered the UK Singles Chart at #3 after 2 years away from the music scene. Stereophonics earned their fifth number one album with Pull the Pin.

On 28 October, Leona Lewis achieved her second number-one single with "Bleeding Love", having sold 218,000 copies in its first week, the highest first-week sales of the year so far. Online downloads reached an all-time high of 1.7 million in a week. Leona also became the third artist in 2007 to have her second number one after Timbaland & Sugababes. On the issue date of October 28 the top five consisted of all British performers/acts, and first three places were new-entries.

- #1. Leona Lewis - Bleeding Love
- #2. Take That - Rule the World
- #3. McFly - The Heart Never Lies
- #4. Sugababes - About You Now
- #5. Mark Ronson & Amy Winehouse - Valerie

=== November ===
On 4 November, The Eagles beat Britney Spears to number one on the Album Chart, and on 11 November, Westlife earned another number one album with Back Home. Boyz II Men came back to the UK with a new album which went to #8.

On 11 November, Spice Girls, Kylie Minogue, Nickelback and Celine Dion returned to the charts due to download sales, with Spice Girls entering at number 20 with "Headlines (Friendship Never Ends)". Minogue entered the charts after two years away with "2 Hearts" at number 12, and Nickelback entered at number 34 with "Rockstar". Dion entered the chart with "Taking Chances" at number 40. Girls Aloud entered the top 10 on downloads alone and rose to 3 a week later on November 11.

November 11 also saw the first performance of the World Requiem, by John Foulds, in 81 years (since 1926).

Nicole Scherzinger's debut single "Baby Love" moved up the chart to #14 to give her her highest peak.

On 18 November, Leona Lewis earned her fourth week at number one with "Bleeding Love", having become the biggest selling single of the year to date. She also became the first artist to have two singles stay at number one for 4 or more weeks in the 2000s (decade) ("Bleeding Love" and "A Moment Like This"). Her debut album Spirit entered the album chart at number one, being the fastest selling debut album and the fourth fastest selling album of all time.

Led Zeppelin's classic song "Stairway To Heaven" charts at #37 for the first time, after their back catalogue and greatest hits album "Mothership" appears on iTunes. Despite the band's incredible fame, their lack of British single releases means that the band had only been in the UK Top 40 once previously.

Soulja Boy Tell 'Em, who had been #1 in the United States for 7 weeks with his single "Crank That (Soulja Boy)," entered the UK Singles Chart on downloads alone at #24.

=== December ===
On 2 December, Leona Lewis earned her sixth week at number one with "Bleeding Love".

On 9 December Leona earns her seventh week at number one as "Bleeding Love" continues to sell well, selling over 700,000 copies thus far. "Bleeding Love" is now in joint 3rd place for Most Weeks At The top Of The Charts. Her album Spirit has so far sold 1,146,246 copies and has gone 3× platinum in just under a month. "Bleeding Love" was the joint third longest number one of the 21st Century so far.

Mariah Carey enters into the top ten for the first time in two years as seasonal favourite "All I Want for Christmas Is You" reaches number eight via downloads. "Crank That (Soulja Boy)" enters at number ten also via downloads for Soulja Boy Tell 'Em which topped the US Chart for six weeks back in the autumn.

On 10 December German Dance Group Cascada enter the top 10 with "What Hurts The Most" (which peaked at #10) after entering at #16 on downloads alone. This was also their 4th top ten single.

On 16 December, singer/songwriter Katie Melua earned her first UK number one single with a duet with Eva Cassidy. It's a cover of Louis Armstrong's classic "What a Wonderful World". All proceeds from the single will go to the Red Cross charity. The song was only available from supermarket chain Tesco. Christmas spirit also returned to the charts as Mariah Carey got to number one on downloads but only number four (behind Eva Cassidy & Katie Melua, Leona Lewis & Soulja Boy Tell 'Em) with "All I Want for Christmas Is You" in the combined chart. The Pogues also charted well, getting to number eight during their third week in the chart (on downloads alone) with Fairytale of New York. Wham!, Wizzard, Andy Williams, Slade, Shakin' Stevens, Band Aid, Chris Rea and John Lennon also provided a festive feel to the top 40. T2 featuring Jodie Aysha slipped to number nine after two weeks at number two.

On the 'Christmas Chart', Kylie Minogue entered at number 32 on downloads alone with her single "Wow" while the Sugababes climbed up thirteen places to number 13 with "Change" after the physical release. Also, Rihanna had three singles in the Top 40, ("Umbrella" at 38, "Hate That I Love You" at 37, and "Don't Stop the Music" at 30), the latter being on downloads alone. X Factor winner Leon Jackson topped the Christmas chart with "When You Believe". This marks the third year in a row that an X Factor winner tops the Christmas chart (Shayne Ward "That's My Goal" did it in 2005 and Leona Lewis repeated it in 2006 with "A Moment Like This"). Leona Lewis topped the Christmas album charts with her debut album "Spirit" for the sixth week.

In the last singles chart of the year Leon Jackson and "When You Believe" remained at number one for a second week, with Leona Lewis climbing back to number two with "Bleeding Love". There were also a number of re-entries from some of the biggest selling singles of the year in the post-Christmas rush, as consumers looked to fill newly purchased digital music players. In the album chart Leona Lewis completed her seventh week at number 1 with "Spirit", with Westlife's "Back Home" holding steady at 2 and Take That climbing back up to 3 with "Beautiful World".

It was also announced by the Official Chart Company that Amy Winehouse had the biggest selling album of the year with "Back To Black" selling 1,586,194 copies. Leona Lewis who had the second biggest selling album with "Spirit" selling 1,550,037 copies in the 48 days since its release. Mika's "Life in Cartoon Motion" was the third biggest selling album of the year. Leona Lewis had the biggest selling single of 2007 with "Bleeding Love" (787,652), with Rihanna's "Umbrella" at number two (512,730), and Mika's "Grace Kelly" in third position.

Radiohead's In Rainbows finally got a physical CD release on 31 December 2007 after causing controversy within the music industry upon initial release as a download only on 10 October 2007. The public were asked to pay whatever they wanted for the record (including nothing) and despite this the CD release would still go on to be the first Number One in the Official Chart Company's album chart for 2008.

== Charts ==
=== Number-one singles ===
| Chart date (week ending) | Song | Artist(s) | Sales |
|---|---|---|---|
| 6 January | "A Moment Like This" | Leona Lewis | 109,027 |
| 13 January | "A Moment Like This" | Leona Lewis | 38,944 |
| 20 January | "A Moment Like This" | Leona Lewis | 20,669 |
| 27 January | "Grace Kelly" | Mika | 30,500 |
| 3 February | "Grace Kelly" | Mika | 38,500 |
| 10 February | "Grace Kelly" | Mika | 77,500 |
| 17 February | "Grace Kelly" | Mika | 55,000 |
| 24 February | "Grace Kelly" | Mika | 43,000 |
| 3 March | "Ruby" | Kaiser Chiefs | 38,000 |
| 10 March | "Shine" | Take That | 41,000 |
| 17 March | "Shine" | Take That | 27,000 |
| 24 March | "Walk This Way" | Sugababes vs. Girls Aloud | 51,500 |
| 31 March | "I'm Gonna Be (500 Miles)" | The Proclaimers featuring Brian Potter & Andy Pipkin | 126,211 |
| 7 April | "I'm Gonna Be (500 Miles)" | The Proclaimers featuring Brian Potter & Andy Pipkin | 56,000 |
| 14 April | "I'm Gonna Be (500 Miles)" | The Proclaimers featuring Brian Potter & Andy Pipkin | 48,000 |
| 21 April | "Give It to Me" | Timbaland featuring Nelly Furtado & Justin Timberlake | 29,760 |
| 28 April | "Beautiful Liar" | Beyoncé & Shakira | 37,500 |
| 5 May | "Beautiful Liar" | Beyoncé & Shakira | 35,000 |
| 12 May | "Beautiful Liar" | Beyoncé & Shakira | 28,000 |
| 19 May | "Baby's Coming Back/Transylvania" | McFly | 30,693 |
| 26 May | "Umbrella" | Rihanna featuring Jay Z | 34,164 |
| 2 June | "Umbrella" | Rihanna featuring Jay Z | 38,482 |
| 9 June | "Umbrella" | Rihanna featuring Jay Z | 60,650 |
| 16 June | "Umbrella" | Rihanna featuring Jay Z | 48,370 |
| 23 June | "Umbrella" | Rihanna featuring Jay Z | 39,038 |
| 30 June | "Umbrella" | Rihanna featuring Jay Z | 32,200 |
| 7 July | "Umbrella" | Rihanna featuring Jay Z | 29,504 |
| 14 July | "Umbrella" | Rihanna featuring Jay Z | 26,757 |
| 21 July | "Umbrella" | Rihanna featuring Jay Z | 23,092 |
| 28 July | "Umbrella" | Rihanna featuring Jay Z | 22,143 |
| 4 August | "The Way I Are" | Timbaland featuring Keri Hilson & D.O.E. | 33,578 |
| 11 August | "The Way I Are" | Timbaland featuring Keri Hilson & D.O.E. | 32,592 |
| 18 August | "With Every Heartbeat" | Robyn with Kleerup | 34,842 |
| 25 August | "Stronger" | Kanye West | 36,804 |
| 1 September | "Stronger" | Kanye West | 32,915 |
| 8 September | "Beautiful Girls" | Sean Kingston | 55,144 |
| 15 September | "Beautiful Girls" | Sean Kingston | 41,787 |
| 22 September | "Beautiful Girls" | Sean Kingston | 32,348 |
| 29 September | "Beautiful Girls" | Sean Kingston | 26,248 |
| 6 October | "About You Now" | Sugababes | 34,068 |
| 13 October | "About You Now" | Sugababes | 54,788 |
| 20 October | "About You Now" | Sugababes | 48,715 |
| 27 October | "About You Now" | Sugababes | 40,738 |
| 3 November | "Bleeding Love" | Leona Lewis | 218,805 |
| 10 November | "Bleeding Love" | Leona Lewis | 158,370 |
| 17 November | "Bleeding Love" | Leona Lewis | 111,978 |
| 24 November | "Bleeding Love" | Leona Lewis | 74,549 |
| 1 December | "Bleeding Love" | Leona Lewis | 57,954 |
| 8 December | "Bleeding Love" | Leona Lewis | 40,530 |
| 15 December | "Bleeding Love" | Leona Lewis | 29,616 |
| 22 December | "What a Wonderful World" | Eva Cassidy & Katie Melua | 56,114 |
| 29 December | "When You Believe" | Leon Jackson | 290,742 |

=== Number-one single downloads ===
| Chart date (week ending) | Song | Artist(s) |
|---|---|---|
| 6 January | "A Moment Like This" | Leona Lewis |
| 13 January | "Patience" | Take That |
| 20 January | "Grace Kelly" | Mika |
| 27 January | "Grace Kelly" | Mika |
| 3 February | "Grace Kelly" | Mika |
| 10 February | "Grace Kelly" | Mika |
| 17 February | "Grace Kelly" | Mika |
| 24 February | "Grace Kelly" | Mika |
| 3 March | "Ruby" | Kaiser Chiefs |
| 10 March | "Ruby" | Kaiser Chiefs |
| 17 March | "Ruby" | Kaiser Chiefs |
| 24 March | "I'm Gonna Be (500 Miles)" | The Proclaimers featuring Brian Potter & Andy Pipkin |
| 31 March | "I'm Gonna Be (500 Miles)" | The Proclaimers featuring Brian Potter & Andy Pipkin |
| 7 April | "I'm Gonna Be (500 Miles)" | The Proclaimers featuring Brian Potter & Andy Pipkin |
| 14 April | "Girlfriend" | Avril Lavigne |
| 21 April | "Stop Me" | Mark Ronson featuring Daniel Merriweather |
| 28 April | "Beautiful Liar" | Beyoncé & Shakira |
| 5 May | "Beautiful Liar" | Beyoncé & Shakira |
| 12 May | "Beautiful Liar" | Beyoncé & Shakira |
| 19 May | "Cupid's Chokehold" | Gym Class Heroes featuring Patrick Stump |
| 26 May | "Umbrella" | Rihanna featuring Jay-Z |
| 2 June | "Umbrella" | Rihanna featuring Jay-Z |
| 9 June | "Umbrella" | Rihanna featuring Jay-Z |
| 16 June | "Umbrella" | Rihanna featuring Jay-Z |
| 23 June | "Umbrella" | Rihanna featuring Jay-Z |
| 30 June | "Umbrella" | Rihanna featuring Jay-Z |
| 7 July | "Umbrella" | Rihanna featuring Jay-Z |
| 14 July | "Umbrella" | Rihanna featuring Jay-Z |
| 21 July | "The Way I Are" | Timbaland featuring Keri Hilson & D.O.E. |
| 28 July | "The Way I Are" | Timbaland featuring Keri Hilson & D.O.E. |
| 4 August | "Foundations" | Kate Nash |
| 11 August | "Foundations" | Kate Nash |
| 18 August | "Stronger" | Kanye West |
| 25 August | "Stronger" | Kanye West |
| 1 September | "Beautiful Girls" | Sean Kingston |
| 8 September | "Beautiful Girls" | Sean Kingston |
| 15 September | "Hey There Delilah" | Plain White T's |
| 22 September | "Hey There Delilah" | Plain White T's |
| 29 September | "Hey There Delilah" | Plain White T's |
| 6 October | "About You Now" | Sugababes |
| 17 October | "About You Now" | Sugababes |
| 20 October | "About You Now" | Sugababes |
| 27 October | "About You Now" | Sugababes |
| 3 November | "Bleeding Love" | Leona Lewis |
| 10 November | "Bleeding Love" | Leona Lewis |
| 17 November | "Bleeding Love" | Leona Lewis |
| 24 November | "Bleeding Love" | Leona Lewis |
| 1 December | "Bleeding Love" | Leona Lewis |
| 8 December | "Bleeding Love" | Leona Lewis |
| 15 December | "Bleeding Love" | Leona Lewis |
| 22 December | "All I Want for Christmas Is You" | Mariah Carey |
| 29 December | "When You Believe" | Leon Jackson |

=== Number-one albums ===
| Chart date (week ending) | Album | Artist | Sales |
|---|---|---|---|
| 6 January | Beautiful World | Take That | |
| 13 January | Beautiful World | Take That | 29,638 |
| 20 January | Back to Black | Amy Winehouse | 35,000 |
| 27 January | Back to Black | Amy Winehouse | 48,000 |
| 3 February | Hats Off to the Buskers | The View | 103,000 |
| 10 February | Not Too Late | Norah Jones | 60,500 |
| 17 February | Life in Cartoon Motion | Mika | 108,000 |
| 24 February | Life in Cartoon Motion | Mika | 81,500 |
| 3 March | Back to Black | Amy Winehouse | 47,000 |
| 10 March | Yours Truly, Angry Mob | Kaiser Chiefs | 151,000 |
| 17 March | Yours Truly, Angry Mob | Kaiser Chiefs | 66,225 |
| 24 March | Doing It My Way | Ray Quinn | 127,000 |
| 31 March | Beautiful World | Take That | 48,500 |
| 7 April | Beautiful World | Take That | 32,102 |
| 14 April | Because of the Times | Kings of Leon | 70,500 |
| 21 April | Because of the Times | Kings of Leon | 29,000 |
| 28 April | The Best Damn Thing | Avril Lavigne | 60,500 |
| 5 May | Favourite Worst Nightmare | Arctic Monkeys | 227,922 |
| 12 May | Favourite Worst Nightmare | Arctic Monkeys | 102,200 |
| 19 May | Favourite Worst Nightmare | Arctic Monkeys | 39,488 |
| 26 May | Minutes to Midnight | Linkin Park | 94,501 |
| 2 June | It Won't Be Soon Before Long | Maroon 5 | 73,517 |
| 9 June | It Won't Be Soon Before Long | Maroon 5 | 39,862 |
| 16 June | Good Girl Gone Bad | Rihanna | 53,722 |
| 23 June | The Traveling Wilburys Collection | Traveling Wilburys | 110,130 |
| 30 June | Icky Thump | The White Stripes | 66,000 |
| 7 July | An End Has a Start | Editors | 59,405 |
| 14 July | We Are the Night | The Chemical Brothers | 36,392 |
| 21 July | We'll Live and Die in These Towns | The Enemy | 39,191 |
| 28 July | One Chance | Paul Potts | 128,315 |
| 4 August | One Chance | Paul Potts | 75,494 |
| 11 August | One Chance | Paul Potts | 45,868 |
| 18 August | Made of Bricks | Kate Nash | 58,756 |
| 25 August | The King | Elvis Presley | 45,034 |
| 1 September | Hand Built by Robots | Newton Faulkner | 29,451 |
| 8 September | Hand Built by Robots | Newton Faulkner | 37,128 |
| 15 September | Once Upon a Time in the West | Hard-Fi | 54,169 |
| 22 September | Graduation | Kanye West | 94,611 |
| 29 September | All the Lost Souls | James Blunt | 117,966 |
| 6 October | Echoes, Silence, Patience & Grace | Foo Fighters | 135,685 |
| 13 October | Magic | Bruce Springsteen | 77,692 |
| 20 October | Change | Sugababes | 53,540 |
| 27 October | Pull the Pin | Stereophonics | 49,012 |
| 3 November | The Trick to Life | The Hoosiers | 55,185 |
| 10 November | Long Road Out of Eden | Eagles | 134,080 |
| 17 November | Back Home | Westlife | 132,315 |
| 24 November | Spirit | Leona Lewis | 375,872 |
| 1 December | Spirit | Leona Lewis | 196,997 |
| 8 December | Spirit | Leona Lewis | 164,433 |
| 15 December | Spirit | Leona Lewis | 180,944 |
| 22 December | Spirit | Leona Lewis | 228,504 |
| 29 December | Spirit | Leona Lewis | 286,437 |

=== Number-one compilation albums ===
| Chart date (week ending) | Album |
|---|---|
| 6 January | Now 65 |
| 13 January | Radio 1's Live Lounge |
| 20 January | Radio 1's Live Lounge |
| 27 January | Radio 1's Live Lounge |
| 3 February | Radio 1's Live Lounge |
| 10 February | Radio 1's Live Lounge |
| 17 February | One Love |
| 24 February | One Love |
| 3 March | Brits Hits – The Album of the Year |
| 10 March | Brits Hits – The Album of the Year |
| 17 March | 101 80s Hits |
| 24 March | To Mum with Love |
| 31 March | Floorfillers Anthems |
| 7 April | Floorfillers Anthems |
| 14 April | Now 66 |
| 21 April | Now 66 |
| 28 April | Now 66 |
| 5 May | Now 66 |
| 12 May | Now 66 |
| 19 May | Now 66 |
| 26 May | Massive R&B – Spring Collection 2007 |
| 2 June | Massive R&B – Spring Collection 2007 |
| 9 June | Massive R&B – Spring Collection 2007 |
| 16 June | Over the Rainbow |
| 23 June | Top Gear Anthems |
| 30 June | Clubland 11 |
| 7 July | Clubland 11 |
| 14 July | Clubland 11 |
| 21 July | R&B Love Collection |
| 28 July | R&B Love Collection |
| 4 August | Now 67 |
| 11 August | Now 67 |
| 18 August | Now 67 |
| 25 August | High School Musical 2 |
| 1 September | High School Musical 2 |
| 8 September | High School Musical 2 |
| 15 September | High School Musical 2 |
| 22 September | High School Musical 2 |
| 29 September | High School Musical 2 |
| 6 October | High School Musical 2 |
| 13 October | Radio 1 Established 1967 |
| 20 October | Radio 1 Established 1967 |
| 27 October | Radio 1 Established 1967 |
| 3 November | Radio 1's Live Lounge – Volume 2 |
| 10 November | Radio 1's Live Lounge – Volume 2 |
| 17 November | Clubland 12 |
| 24 November | Pop Party 5 |
| 1 December | Now 68 |
| 8 December | Now 68 |
| 15 December | Now 68 |
| 22 December | Now 68 |
| 29 December | Now 68 |

=== Number-one album downloads ===
| Chart date (week ending) | Album | Artist |
|---|---|---|
| 6 January | Beautiful World | Take That |
| 13 January | Back to Black | Amy Winehouse |
| 20 January | Back to Black | Amy Winehouse |
| 27 January | Back to Black | Amy Winehouse |
| 3 February | Hats Off to the Buskers | The View |
| 10 February | Not Too Late | Norah Jones |
| 17 February | Life in Cartoon Motion | Mika |
| 24 February | Life in Cartoon Motion | Mika |
| 3 March | Life in Cartoon Motion | Mika |
| 10 March | Yours Truly, Angry Mob | Kaiser Chiefs |
| 17 March | Neon Bible | Arcade Fire |
| 24 March | Introducing Joss Stone | Joss Stone |
| 31 March | Beautiful World | Take That |
| 7 April | Tim's House | Kate Walsh |
| 14 April | Because of the Times | Kings of Leon |
| 21 April | Because of the Times | Kings of Leon |
| 28 April | Version | Mark Ronson |
| 5 May | Favourite Worst Nightmare | Arctic Monkeys |
| 12 May | Favourite Worst Nightmare | Arctic Monkeys |
| 19 May | Favourite Worst Nightmare | Arctic Monkeys |
| 26 May | Minutes to Midnight | Linkin Park |
| 2 June | It Won't Be Soon Before Long | Maroon 5 |
| 9 June | It Won't Be Soon Before Long | Maroon 5 |
| 16 June | Love It When I Feel Like This | The Twang |
| 23 June | Lost Highway | Bon Jovi |
| 30 June | Icky Thump | The White Stripes |
| 7 July | An End Has a Start | Editors |
| 14 July | We Are the Night | The Chemical Brothers |
| 21 July | Thirst for Romance | Cherry Ghost |
| 28 July | We'll Live and Die in These Towns | The Enemy |
| 4 August | This Is the Life | Amy Macdonald |
| 11 August | Hand Built by Robots | Newton Faulkner |
| 18 August | Hand Built by Robots | Newton Faulkner |
| 25 August | Hand Built by Robots | Newton Faulkner |
| 1 September | Hand Built by Robots | Newton Faulkner |
| 8 September | Hand Built by Robots | Newton Faulkner |
| 15 September | Once Upon a Time in the West | Hard-Fi |
| 22 September | Graduation | Kanye West |
| 29 September | All the Lost Souls | James Blunt |
| 6 October | Echoes, Silence, Patience & Grace | Foo Fighters |
| 13 October | Echoes, Silence, Patience & Grace | Foo Fighters |
| 20 October | Matinée | Jack Peñate |
| 27 October | Pull the Pin | Stereophonics |
| 3 November | The Trick to Life | The Hoosiers |
| 10 November | Blackout | Britney Spears |
| 17 November | Long Road Out of Eden | The Eagles |
| 24 November | Spirit | Leona Lewis |
| 1 December | Spirit | Leona Lewis |
| 8 December | X | Kylie Minogue |
| 15 December | Spirit | Leona Lewis |
| 22 December | Mothership | Led Zeppelin |
| 29 December | Call Me Irresponsible | Michael Bublé |

== Year-end charts ==
=== Best-selling singles of 2007 ===
| No. | Title | Artist | Peak position | Sales |
|---|---|---|---|---|
| 1 | "Bleeding Love" | Leona Lewis | 1 | 787,653 |
| 2 | "Umbrella" | Rihanna featuring Jay-Z | 1 | 511,000 |
| 3 | "Grace Kelly" | Mika | 1 | |
| 4 | "When You Believe" | Leon Jackson | 1 | 395,669 |
| 5 | "Rule the World" | Take That | 2 | 357,459 |
| 6 | "About You Now" | Sugababes | 1 | 346,000 |
| 7 | "The Way I Are" | Timbaland featuring Keri Hilson and D.O.E. | 1 | |
| 8 | "(I'm Gonna Be) 500 Miles" | The Proclaimers featuring Brian Potter & Andy Pipkin | 1 | 336,138 |
| 9 | "Valerie" | Mark Ronson featuring Amy Winehouse | 2 | |
| 10 | "Ruby" | Kaiser Chiefs | 1 | |
| 11 | "How to Save a Life" | The Fray | 4 | |
| 12 | "Beautiful Liar" | Beyoncé & Shakira | 1 | |
| 13 | "The Sweet Escape" | Gwen Stefani featuring Akon | 2 | |
| 14 | "Hey There Delilah" | Plain White T's | 2 | |
| 15 | "Beautiful Girls" | Sean Kingston | 1 | |
| 16 | "Apologize" | Timbaland featuring OneRepublic | 3 | 275,646 |
| 17 | "Foundations" | Kate Nash | 2 | |
| 18 | "Shine" | Take That | 1 | |
| 19 | "Stronger" | Kanye West | 1 | |
| 20 | "Girlfriend" | Avril Lavigne | 2 | |
| 21 | "Big Girls Don't Cry" | Fergie | 2 | |
| 22 | "Give It to Me" | Timbaland featuring Nelly Furtado & Justin Timberlake | 1 | |
| 23 | "Starz in Their Eyes" | Just Jack | 2 | |
| 24 | "With Every Heartbeat" | Robyn with Kleerup | 1 | |
| 25 | "Ayo Technology" | 50 Cent featuring Justin Timberlake and Timbaland | 2 | |
| 26 | "Do You Know? (The Ping Pong Song)" | Enrique Iglesias | 3 | |
| 27 | "Cupid's Chokehold" | Gym Class Heroes featuring Patrick Stump | 3 | |
| 28 | "What Goes Around... Comes Around" | Justin Timberlake | 4 | |
| 29 | "Say It Right" | Nelly Furtado | 10 | 188,989 |
| 30 | "Patience" | Take That | 2 (Note: Reached number 1 in 2006) | |
| 31 | "Worried About Ray" | The Hoosiers | 5 | |
| 32 | "Shut Up and Drive" | Rihanna | 5 | |
| 33 | "Glamorous" | Fergie featuring Ludacris | 6 | |
| 34 | "Chasing Cars" | Snow Patrol | 9 (Note: Reached number 6 in 2006) | |
| 35 | "This Ain't a Scene, It's an Arms Race" | Fall Out Boy | 2 | |
| 36 | "I Wanna Love You" | Akon featuring Snoop Dogg | 3 | |
| 37 | "Heartbroken" | T2 featuring Jodie Aysha | 2 | |
| 38 | "Stop Me" | Mark Ronson featuring Daniel Merriweather | 2 | |
| 39 | "Destination Calabria" | Alex Gaudino featuring Crystal Waters | 4 | |
| 40 | "Don't Matter" | Akon | 3 | |
| 41 | "Let Me Think About It" | Ida Corr vs Fedde le Grand | 2 | |
| 42 | "No U Hang Up"/"If That's OK with You" | Shayne Ward | 2 | |
| 43 | "Home" | Westlife | 3 | |
| 44 | "Perfect (Exceeder)" | Mason vs Princess Superstar | 3 | |
| 45 | "Too Little Too Late" | JoJo | 4 | |
| 46 | "She's So Lovely" | Scouting for Girls | 7 | |
| 47 | "Here (In Your Arms)" | Hellogoodbye | 4 | |
| 48 | "Same Jeans" | The View | 3 | |
| 49 | "No One" | Alicia Keys | 6 | |
| 50 | "Because of You" | Ne-Yo | 4 | |

=== Best-selling albums of 2007 ===
| No. | Title | Artist | Peak position | Sales |
|---|---|---|---|---|
| 1 | Back to Black | Amy Winehouse | 1 | 1,586,194 |
| 2 | Spirit | Leona Lewis | 1 | 1,550,037 |
| 3 | Life in Cartoon Motion | Mika | 1 | 1,173,044 |
| 4 | Beautiful World | Take That | 1 | 1,080,332 |
| 5 | Back Home | Westlife | 1 | 854,344 |
| 6 | Long Road Out of Eden | Eagles | 1 | 679,831 |
| 7 | Yours Truly, Angry Mob | Kaiser Chiefs | 1 | |
| 8 | Favourite Worst Nightmare | Arctic Monkeys | 1 | |
| 9 | Shock Value | Timbaland | 2 | |
| 10 | Good Girl Gone Bad | Rihanna | 1 | |
| 11 | Eyes Open | Snow Patrol | 3 (Note: Reached number 1 in 2006) | |
| 12 | Version | Mark Ronson | 2 | |
| 13 | All the Lost Souls | James Blunt | 1 | |
| 14 | Loose | Nelly Furtado | 4 | |
| 15 | Echoes, Silence, Patience & Grace | Foo Fighters | 1 | |
| 16 | FutureSex/LoveSounds | Justin Timberlake | 6 (Note: Reached number 1 in 2006) | |
| 17 | Mothership | Led Zeppelin | 4 | |
| 18 | Call Me Irresponsible (Special Edition) | Michael Bublé | 2 | |
| 19 | The Best of Andrea Bocelli: Vivere | Andrea Bocelli | 4 | |
| 20 | Hand Built by Robots | Newton Faulkner | 1 | 373,268 |
| 21 | The Ultimate Collection | Whitney Houston | 3 | |
| 22 | Every Time We Touch | Cascada | 2 | |
| 23 | Undiscovered | James Morrison | 2 (Note: Reached number 1 in 2006) | |
| 24 | Sam's Town | The Killers | 6 (Note: Reached number 1 in 2006) | |
| 25 | Costello Music | The Fratellis | 2 | |
| 26 | Alright, Still | Lily Allen | 2 | |
| 27 | Breathless | Shayne Ward | 2 | |
| 28 | The Traveling Wilburys Collection | Traveling Wilburys | 1 | |
| 29 | These Streets | Paolo Nutini | 3 | |
| 30 | The Trick to Life | The Hoosiers | 1 | |
| 31 | Because of the Times | Kings of Leon | 1 | |
| 32 | Change | Sugababes | 1 | |
| 33 | How to Save a Life | The Fray | 4 | |
| 34 | The Best Damn Thing | Avril Lavigne | 1 | |
| 35 | Never Forget | Take That | 2 | |
| 36 | One Chance | Paul Potts | 1 | |
| 37 | Frank | Amy Winehouse | 13 | |
| 38 | Made of Bricks | Kate Nash | 1 | |
| 39 | Hits | Phil Collins | 7 (Note: Reached number 1 in 1998) | |
| 40 | Infinity on High | Fall Out Boy | 3 | |
| 41 | Complete Clapton | Eric Clapton | 2 | |
| 42 | Greatest Hits | Spice Girls | 2 | |
| 43 | Razorlight | Razorlight | 4 (Note: Reached number 1 in 2006) | |
| 44 | Minutes to Midnight | Linkin Park | 1 | |
| 45 | Hats Off to the Buskers | The View | 1 | |
| 46 | I'm Not Dead | Pink | 6 (Note: Reached number 3 in 2006) | |
| 47 | This Is the Life | Amy Macdonald | 2 (Note: Reached number 1 in 2008) | |
| 48 | It Won't Be Soon Before Long | Maroon 5 | 1 | |
| 49 | Pictures | Katie Melua | 2 | |
| 50 | Rejoice | Katherine Jenkins | 3 | |

=== Best-selling compilation albums of 2007 ===
| No. | Title | Peak position | Sales |
|---|---|---|---|
| 1 | Now 68 | 1 | 1,121,409 |
| 2 | Now 66 | 1 | |
| 3 | Now 67 | 1 | |
| 4 | High School Musical 2 | 1 | 560,990 |
| 5 | Radio 1's Live Lounge – Volume 2 | 1 | |
| 6 | High School Musical | 1 | 394,217 |
| 7 | Radio 1 Established 1967 | 1 | |
| 8 | Pop Party 5 | 1 | |
| 9 | Dreamboats and Petticoats | 2 | |
| 10 | Anthems 1991–2008 | 2 | |

== See also ==
- List of UK Dance Chart number-one singles of 2007
- List of UK Indie Chart number-one singles of 2007
- List of UK Rock Chart number-one singles of 2007
