= Tears of an Angel =

Tears of an Angel may refer to:

== Music ==
- "Tears of an Angel", a song by Marty Friedman from his 2008 album Future Addict
- "Tears of an Angel", a song by Mike Oldfield from his 2005 album Light + Shade
- "Tears of an Angel", a song by RyanDan from their self-titled 2007 album RyanDan

== Others ==
- Tears of an Angel (天使の涙?), 10th episode of Nightwalker: The Midnight Detective
