= Stage fright (disambiguation) =

Stage fright is the anxiety or fear felt by a person called upon to perform before an audience.

Stage fright or stagefright may also refer to:

== Films ==
- Stage Fright (1923 film), an Our Gang short subject
- Stage Fright (1940 film), a Warner Bros. animated cartoon short directed by Chuck Jones
- Stage Fright (1950 film), directed by Alfred Hitchcock
- Nightmares (1980 film), also known as Stage Fright, directed by John D. Lamond
- Stage Fright (1987 film), an Italian horror film directed by Michele Soavi
- Stage Fright (1989 film), an independent film produced and directed by Brad Mays
- Stage Fright (1997 film), an animated short film by Steve Box which won a BAFTA in 1998
- Stage Fright (2014 film), a horror musical film directed by Jerome Sable
- Stage Fright (2017 film), an American made-for-TV thriller film starring Jordan Ladd

== Music ==
- Stage Fright (album), a 1970 album by The Band
  - "Stage Fright" (The Band song), the title song from the album
- "Stage Fright" (Chic song), a 1981 song by Chic
- Stage Fright (video), a 2005 DVD by Motörhead
- Stagefright (album), a 1980 album by Witchfynde
- "Stagefright", a song by Def Leppard on their 1983 album Pyromania
- "Stage Fright", a song by Blake McGrath on his 2010 album Time to Move

== Television ==
- "Stage Fright" (Dollhouse), a 2009 episode
- "Stage Fright" (Only Fools and Horses), a 1991 episode

== Other uses ==
- Inside No. 9 Stage/Fright, a play based on the TV series Inside No. 9
- Stagefright (bug), a remotely exploitable software bug in the Android operating system
- Paruresis, also known as stage fright, a type of social anxiety disorder in which the sufferer is unable to urinate in the presence of others
- Stage Fright, a Justin Richards novel in the series The Invisible Detective
- Stage Fright, a book spin-off of Undercover Brothers (The Hardy Boys) and Girl Detective (Nancy Drew)
