= Dan Talevski =

Canadian singer-songwriter (b. 1992)

- Origin: Georgetown, Ontario, Canada
- Genre: Pop
- Years active: 2007–present
- Labels: eOne Music, Interscope Records
- Website: www.dantalevski.com

Dan Talevski is a Canadian singer-songwriter from Georgetown, Ontario, who comes from a Macedonian background. His career first began as an online YouTube sensation in 2007 posting covers of popular songs. Since then he has gone on to work with will.i.am, Soulja Boy, Shawn Desman, Keshia Chanté, Timbaland, Tyler Shaw, and was selected as direct support for Backstreet Boys on its 2010 This Is Us Tour.

== History ==
=== Beginnings, debut single, and signing with Interscope Records ===
Talevski had already garnered a massive internet following in 2007 thanks to his first viral video; a short clip of him singing "What Goes Around, Comes Around" by Justin Timberlake. After receiving mass attention online, he began taking requests from fans and has posted several covers of popular songs to his channel. As his fan base continued to grow many people began to take notice including Polow Da Don who reached out to Talevski and flew him out to Los Angeles to meet Jimmy Iovine the President of Interscope Records. This would lead to his major label signing and allowed him to release his debut single "Do It Again" on November 8, 2010, featuring Soulja Boy and produced by will.i.am.

=== This is Us Tour ===
In 2009 Backstreet Boys announced its world tour for the group's new album and announced select openers in different regions. Talevski made his debut to the stage joining the tour from August 6, 2010, to August 16, 2010, playing to thousands of people in arenas across Canada. Howie Dorough would introduce Talevski at the beginning of each set since he is a new artist beginning his career playing sold-out shows to many fans. Howie managed Talevski along with CJ Huyer as 3Street Management. This close relationship would lead to Talevski filling the support slots for the Canadian dates of tour and his chance to play some new songs live including "Do It Again".

=== Return to Toronto and Much Music Digital Studios ===
After the release of his single and his first tour Talevski began to contemplate his career and decided he didn't want to sing on someone else's work and would prefer to discover his own talent once again. In 2011, Dan departed from Los Angeles taking the knowledge and experience he gained from working with Interscope Records and would return home to Toronto where he spent the next few years honing his craft. In an interview with Global News, Talevski discusses his reasoning for coming home, "I was being pulled in so any different directions I was being told what to dress like what to sing like and it just wasn't me and I knew at the end of the day I wanted to write my own songs and perform how I wanted to perform and I just knew it was time after four years being with Interscope."

In 2015, Much Music began a new segment of showcasing online talent from established and emerging video loggers that would be featured on its Web site. This collective of online sensations featuring the best in Comedy, Music, Beauty, Video Gaming and more would be called MUCH Digital Studios. Talevski went on to be one of the first digital creators for MUCH hosting a segment of weekly video logs and behind the scenes footage of his music. This led to Talevski meeting fellow Canadian pop star Tyler Shaw, who he remains close friends with to this day. In a recent interview Dan reflects on his experience as a digital creator,"Being a creator has helped my audience see me in a different light. It shows me on a personal level which I never let people see before. It was always about my voice and performance. Now it’s something deeper and something they can connect to."

=== Signing to eOne Music Canada ===
In early 2015, it was announced that Talevski would sign with eOne Music Canada and released his debut single "Guilty As Sin" on February 9, 2015. With his new single, Talevski began his rebirth as a musician and would continue to write and release songs as a newly renowned artist. His contribution as a MUCH digital creator would get him the chance to present at the 2015 MMVAs along with fellow presenters Arkells, Lights, Marianas Trench, Adam Lambert and fellow digital creator Tyler Shaw. Following his signing with eOne Dan signed with RyanDan Inc. Management on May 8, 2015. Later that summer Talevski released his second single titled "My Religion" on July 31, 2015 which he filmed a music video for that was filmed in various parts of Spain. His latest single "Knock Me Off My Feet" was released on February 1, 2016. The music video was shot in Las Vegas and premiered on Much Music April 14, 2016. Dan received a Pop Artist of the Year nomination at the 16th Annual Indie Awards and Best New Solo Artist: CHR nomination at the Canadian Radio Music Awards during Canadian Music Week 2016. Dan was nominated for a Much Music Video Award for Best New Canadian Artist on May 18, 2016.

== Style ==
Talevski has been known to use elements of Pop, Dance music and R&B elements in his music. It is often blended in with sincere melodies and a soothing atmosphere that features sensual lyrics and thus delivers the vibe that is displayed through his songs. This is what Dan had to say when asked about his music in a TV performance with CHCH, "At the end of the day it's pretty much Pop but it has a taste of that darker, urban undertone. A little more mature... but at the end of the day it's just Pop!". Dan is said to be a big fan of Francesco Yates, Justin Bieber, Shawn Mendes, Kiesza and MAGIC!.

== Songwriting ==
Asides from working on his own original music, Dan has also contributed his skills to artists such as Robin Schulz on his single "Love Me Loud" as well as working on the gold selling single "House of Cards" by Tyler Shaw. Dan has also written songs for a number of pop artists such as Shawn Desman, Danny Fernandes, and the single "I Miss U" by Keshia Chanté.

== Personal life ==
Dan married Laura O'Reilly in October 2023. They have two children: a daughter, River, born in October 2020, and a son, Haven, born in September 2025. In November 2025, Dan and Laura were featured on season 2 of Old Enough! on TVO Kids.

== Discography ==
=== Extended plays ===
Title	Details
High Times	Released: October 27, 2017; Label: eOne Music; Format: Digital download

=== Singles ===
Year	Single	Peak positions				Certifications	Album
Year	Single	CAN	CAN AC	CAN CHR	CAN Hot AC	Certifications	Album
2010	"Do It Again" (featuring Soulja Boy)	—	—	—	—		Non-album single
2015	"Guilty As Sin"	64	—	13	21		High Times
2015	"My Religion"	—	—	—	—		High Times
2016	"Knock Me Off My Feet"	84	41	13	17		High Times
2016	"Rocket"	—	—	—	—		High Times
2017	"Birthday Suit"	—	—	—	—		High Times
2017	"Papers" (featuring Aleesia)	—	—	—	—		High Times
2018	"The Wire"	—	—	50	—		Non-album singles
2019	"Home Alone"	—	—	—	—		Non-album singles
2019	"If I Ain't Got You"	—	—	—	—		Non-album singles
2019	"This Is How We Do It"	—	—	—	—		Non-album singles
2019	"Too Close" (with Ria Mae)	67	21	13	17	MC: Gold	Non-album singles
2020	"Touch the Sky"	—	—	—	—		Non-album singles
2020	"Don't Ever Leave"	—	—	—	—		Non-album singles
2021	"Back to Me" (with RadioClub)	—	—	—	—		Non-album singles
2022	"Detonate"	—	—	—	—		Non-album singles
2024	"mine"	—	—	—	—		Non-album singles
2026	"Bad Intentions"	—	—	—	—		Non-album singles
"—" denotes releases that did not chart

== Awards and nominations ==
Year	Ceremony	Award	Result
2016	Canadian Radio Music Awards	Best New Solo Artist: CHR	Nominated
2016	16th Annual Indies	Pop Artist Of The Year	Nominated
2016	Much Music Video Awards	Best New Canadian Artist	Nominated
