= Passione (Paul Potts album) =

Studio album by Paul Potts
- Released: 13 April 2009
- Genres: Classical, operatic pop, classical crossover
- Labels: Syco, Columbia, Sony Music
- Producer: Quiz & Larossi

Paul Potts chronology
One Chance (2007)	Passione (2009)	Cinema Paradiso (2010)

Professional ratings
Review scores
Source	Rating
Headlines	8/10 stars

Passione is the second album by British singer Paul Potts. It was released on 13 April 2009 in New Zealand, on 5 May 2009 in the US and on 1 June 2009 in the UK. Potts spent nearly a year recording Passione in Prague and Stockholm.

== Track listing ==
Track number	Title	Composer	Producer	Language	Time	Notes
1	La Prima Volta (First Time Ever I Saw Your Face)	Ewan MacColl	produced, recorded, and mixed by Quiz and Larossi for XL Talent	Italian	4:02	"La Prima Volta" is Italian for "The First Time."
2	Sei Con Me (There For Me); Duet with Hayley Westenra	Angelo La Bionda, Carmelo La Bionda, Charly Ricanek, James Palmer, Matteo Saggese	produced and recorded by Quiz and Larossi for XL Talent	Italian	3:53	
3	Un Giorno Per Noi (A Time For Us)	Nino Rota, Larry Kusik, Edward Snyder, Alfredo Rapetti	produced, recorded, and mixed by Quiz and Larossi for XL Talent	Italian	3:39	"Un Giorno Per Noi" is Italian for "One Day For Us." From Romeo and Juliet.
4	Il Canto	Romano Musumarra, Luca Barbarossa	produced, recorded, and mixed by Quiz and Larossi for XL Talent	Italian	3:29	"Il Canto" is Italian for "The Song"
5	Senza Luce (A Whiter Shade Of Pale)	Gary Brooker, Keith Reid, Matthew Fisher	produced, recorded, and mixed by Quiz and Larossi for XL Talent	Italian	4:38	"Senza Luce" is Italian for "Without Light."
6	Piano (Memory)	Andrew Lloyd Webber, T.S. Eliot, Trevor Nunn, Roberto Ferri	produced, recorded, and mixed by Quiz and Larossi for XL Talent	Italian	4:12	From the musical Cats.
7	Mamma (Mama)	Josef Larossi, Andreas Romdhane, Savan Kotecha, Charlie Rapino	produced, recorded, and mixed by Quiz and Larossi for XL Talent	Italian	3:48	"Mamma" is Italian for "Mother."
8	Tristesse	Frédéric Chopin, Andreas Romdhane, Josef Larossi, Ulf Janson, Henrik Janson	produced, recorded, and mixed by Quiz and Larossi for XL Talent	Italian	3:23	
9	Bellamore	Matteo Saggese, Mino Vergnaghi	produced, recorded, and mixed by Quiz and Larossi for XL Talent	Italian	4:03	Original song written for Paul Potts.
10	E Lucevan Le Stelle	Giacomo Puccini, Giuseppe Giacosa, Luigi Illica, Andreas Romdhane, Josef Larossi, Ulf Janson, Henrik Janson	produced, recorded, and mixed by Quiz and Larossi for XL Talent	Italian	3:08	Aria from third act of opera Tosca. "E Lucevan Le Stelle" is Italian for "And The Stars Were Shining."

== Charts ==
The album debuted at number one in New Zealand on 20 April 2009. It was certified Gold in its first week, selling over 7,500 copies. It debuted at number 10 in Canada (number one on the classical charts) on 5 May 2009. The album entered the UK Albums Chart on 7 June 2009 at number 5,

Chart performance for Passione
Chart (2009)	Peak position
Australian Albums (ARIA)	7
Austrian Albums (Ö3 Austria)	5
Belgian Albums (Ultratop Flanders)	14
Canadian Albums Chart	4
Danish Albums (Hitlisten)	6
Dutch Albums (Album Top 100)	9
German Albums (Offizielle Top 100)	9
Hungarian Albums (MAHASZ)	12
Irish Albums (IRMA)	15
New Zealand Albums (RMNZ)	1
Spanish Albums (Promusicae)	20
Swedish Albums (Sverigetopplistan)	5
Swiss Albums (Schweizer Hitparade)	9
UK Albums (Official Charts)	5
US Billboard 200	33

== Certifications ==
Region	Certification	Certified units/sales
Australia (ARIA)	Gold	35,000^{^}
New Zealand (RMNZ)	Gold	7,500^{^}
Sweden (GLF)	Gold	20,000^{^}
^{^} Shipments figures based on certification alone.
