= Blake McGrath =

Canadian dancer, choreographer and singer

Blake Andler McGrath
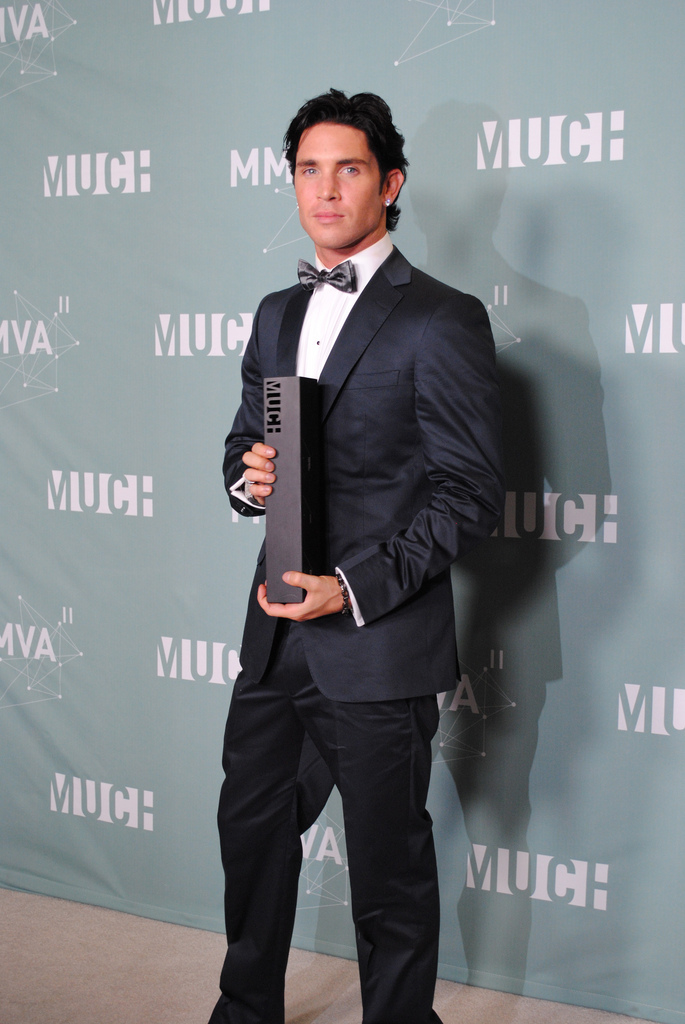
- Blake McGrath in 2011

Background information
- Born: Blake James McGrath; November 21, 1983 (age 42); Mississauga, Ontario, Canada
- Occupations: Dancer, choreographer, singer, model, actor
- Spouse: Taylor Andler (m.2023)

Blake Andler McGrath (born November 21, 1983) is a Canadian professional dancer, pop singer, actor, model, and choreographer. He was known for being on the first season of So You Think You Can Dance in 2005, and on the MTV reality dance show DanceLife. He has also developed a solo singing career with a debut album Time to Move in 2010.

On May 27, 2023, McGrath married Taylor Andler who has taken the name of Taylor Andler McGrath.

== Early career ==
McGrath was born in Mississauga, Ontario. He attended Cawthra Park Secondary School, School of the Arts and Applewood Heights Secondary School in Mississauga as well as St. Jean de Brebeuf Catholic Secondary School in Hamilton, Ontario.

His early television appearances include: Choices of the Heart: The Margaret Sanger Story (1997) playing Stuart Sanger, and the TV show recreation of Goosebumps book "Stay Out of the Basement", in which he played the brother Casey.

In 2001, McGrath was chosen to perform on Michael Jackson's thirtieth anniversary special. In 2006, he performed alongside Paulina Rubio at the 2004 Latin Grammy Awards. Also in 2006 he has an appearance in the documentary Freestyle (with Brian Friedman). He has appeared in Gap campaigns (with Sarah Jessica Parker), and in advertisements for iPod, JCPenney (which he also choreographed), and Hummer.

He has danced with stars such as Madonna, Britney Spears, Kylie Minogue, Janet Jackson, Adam Lambert, Ashanti, Destiny's Child, Katy Perry, Craig David, and Jewel.

In addition to his appearances on television shows, McGrath has also appeared in the films Butterbox Babies, Life With Mikey, Chicago, and Rent. He was also featured as a dancer in The Suite Life of Zack & Cody in the episode Commercial Breaks. He was a waiter, and studied at Tiffany Dance Academy in Hamilton Ontario, Deborah Thomson School of Dance in Brampton, Ontario and Joanne Chapman School of Dance in Brampton, Ontario.

He is owner of VIP Dance Events which tours major cities throughout Canada. Lastly, he appeared on the 9/10/13 episode of Dance Moms as a guest choreographer.

== Dancing career ==
In 2005, McGrath participated as a contestant on So You Think You Can Dance, he also never landed in the danger zone. He appeared in the 2007 reality TV show DanceLife produced by Jennifer Lopez. In 2014, he appeared in the Lifetime hit Dance Moms as a guest choreographer for the Candy Apples Dance Center (CADC), the main rival of the Abby Lee Dance Company.

=== Choreography in So You Think You Can Dance Canada series (2008-2010) ===
He is the lead choreographer for the audition cities and alternating third judge on So You Think You Can Dance Canada. He has had contributions for all three seasons to date of the Canadian series as follows:

| Season | Week | Dancers | Style | Music |
|---|---|---|---|---|
| Season 1 (Canada) | Week 3 | Arassay Reyes; Nico Archambault | Contemporary | "Let Me Leave"—Marc Broussard |
| Season 1 (Canada) | Week 4 | Kaitlyn Fitzgerald; Izaak Smith | Jazz Funk | "Breakin' Dishes"—Rihanna |
| Season 1 (Canada) | Week 5 | Top 12 | Contemporary | "I Surrender"—Celine Dion |
| Season 1 (Canada) | Week 7 | Lisa Auguste; Nico Archambault | Jazz Funk | "When I Grow Up"—The Pussycat Dolls |
| Season 1 (Canada) | Week 8 | Lisa Auguste; Miles Faber | Contemporary | "The Face"—RyanDan |
| Season 2 (Canada) | Week 2 | Amy Gardner; Vincent Desjardins | Contemporary | "When You Say My Name"—Mario Spinetti |
| Season 2 (Canada) | Week 3 | Kim Gingras; Emanuel Sandhu | Jazz Funk | "Love Sex Magic"—Ciara feat Justin Timberlake |
| Season 2 (Canada) | Week 4 | Top 14 | Jazz Funk | "LoveGame"—Lady Gaga |
| Season 2 (Canada) | Week 5 | Jayme Rae Dailey; Daniel Dory | Contemporary | "It Must Have Been Love"—Kari Kimmel |
| Season 2 (Canada) | Week 8 | Jayme Rae Dailey; Emanuel Sandhu | Jazz Funk | "I Gotta Feeling"—The Black Eyed Peas |
| Season 3 (Canada) | Week 2 | Kloé Schultz; Jonathan Arsenault | Jazz | "California Gurls"—Katy Perry feat Snoop Dogg |
| Season 3 (Canada) | Week 4 | Nathalie Heath; Mackenzie Green | Contemporary | "After Afterall"—William Fitzsimmons |
| Season 3 (Canada) | Week 5 | Nathalie Heath; Jonathan Arsenault | Jazz | "Teenage Dream"—Katy Perry |
| Season 3 (Canada) | Week 7 | Janick Arseneau; Jeff Mortensen | Jazz Funk | "Come On Girl"—Taio Cruz feat Luciana Caporoso |

== Musical career ==
- Blake started pursuing a music career and released his first single "The Night (Only Place To Go)" on April 27, 2010, on MuchMusic. He presented an award with Girlicious at the 2010 MuchMusic Video Awards on June 20, 2010. His follow-up single was Relax on August 3, 2010, which also won an MMVA award. On November 2, 2010, he released his first studio album Time to Move. It peaked at 39 on the Canadian Album charts. It was later released March 14, 2011, but failed to chart.
- He released his second studio album entitled "Love Revolution" on September 30, 2013.
- Blake's EP I am Blake McGrath was released in 2017 with the lead singles 'Love Myself' and 'Harder Than The First Time'.
- Blake's third studio album 'INNERvention' was released on September 6, 2019, with the lead singles 'Dive in the Water', 'Innervention' and 'Breakthrough'. The album debuted in the top 20 the first week of sales on the Billboard Christian/Gospel album chart.

== Personal life ==
As of 2019, McGrath lives in Los Angeles, California.

McGrath acknowledged he was gay in a 2009 interview with the Canadian gay magazine fab. "I've been attracted to men and attracted to women... My feelings change all the time. One day I can feel like I'm gay, another day like I'm straight. But I'm not just one or the other, I'm Blake McGrath and I'm attracted to somebody on the inside."

== Discography ==
=== Studio albums ===
| Year | Album details | Peak | |
| Year | Album details | CAN | US |
|---|---|---|---|
| 2010 | Time to Move: Release Date: November 2, 2010; Label: Interscope Format: CD, digital download | 39 | - |
| 2013 | Love Revolution: Release Date: September 30, 2013; Label: Interscope Format: CD, digital download | - | - |
| 2019 | Innervention: Release Year: September 6, 2019; Distributor: Starblazius Records Format: CD, digital | - | 19 |
| 2021 | Wild Love: Release Date: January 15, 2021; Distributor: Starblazius Records Format: CD, digital | - | - |

=== Extended plays ===
| Year | Album details | Peak | |
| Year | Album details | CAN | US |
|---|---|---|---|
| 2017 | Vintage Tomorrow: Release Date: June 9, 2017; Label: Blake McGrath Format: CD, digital download | - | - |
| 2017 | I Am Blake McGrath: Release Date: December 6, 2017; Label: Starblazius Records Format: CD, digital download | - | - |

=== Singles ===
- "The Night (Only Place to Go)" (2010)
- "Relax" (2010)
- "Stage Fright" (2011)
- "Love Sick" (2011)
- "Burn the Floor" (2011)

=== Tours ===
Stage Fright Tour (2011)

- First tour for Blake McGrath's debut studio album "Time To Move"

== Filmography ==
- 1993: Life with Mikey as an acrobat
- 1995: Butterbox Babies as Simon (age 7/8)
- 1995: Choices of the Heart: The Margaret Sanger Story as Stuart Sanger (TV movie)
- 1996: Goosebumps as Casey Brewer (in 2 episodes in TV series)
- 2002: Chicago as a male dancer
- 2004: Britney Spears Live from Miami as a dancer (TV movie)
- 2005: Rent as dancer (uncredited)
- 2007: Dancelife as himself
- 2013: Dance Moms as himself
