= Ben Mills =

British singer

- Born: Benjamin Collett Mills; 1 March 1980 (age 46)
- Origin: Chatham, Kent, England
- Genres: Rock
- Occupation: Singer-songwriter
- Instruments: Vocals, guitar, piano, keyboard
- Years active: 2006–present
- Label: Sony BMG

Benjamin Collett Mills is a British singer who was the last contestant eliminated on the third series of The X Factor in 2006.

After the show, Mills signed a five-album record deal with Sony BMG. His debut album, Picture of You, was released on 12 March 2007. His debut single was advertised as "Beside You" and set to be released on 5 March 2007, but it was pulled by the record company at the last minute. The reason given was to concentrate on album sales. The album achieved the BPI Gold status award.

== Early life and career ==
Mills was a co-director of a marquee hire company in his home town of Whitstable before appearing on The X Factor.

He gained a diploma in music from the Academy of Contemporary Music in Guildford, Surrey and has been singing since he was a child. He also plays piano and guitar. He was also a keyboard player in the tribute band to The Doors called The L.A. Doors and toured the pub and club circuit with his own band called Benzego.

Mills' audition song for The X Factor was "Bring It On Home To Me" by Sam Cooke, which impressed the panel of judges; Simon Cowell thought he sounded like a young Joe Cocker, whom, incidentally, Ben names as one of his musical influences along with Tom Waits, Rod Stewart and David Bowie. During his time on The X Factor he was mentored by Sharon Osbourne.

His second album, Freedom, was released on 8 March 2010, and launched on 13 March 2010 at the Gulbenkian Theatre in Canterbury.

== Personal life ==
Mills announced his engagement to longtime girlfriend, Melissa, in April 2009. They were married at Blean Church in July 2009.

In June 2011, Ben performed at the Music on the Hill festival at West Malling in Kent, on behalf of Demelza Hospice Care for Children, together with Katherine Jenkins, McFly, ABC, and Björn Again.

In October 2011, Ben teamed up with Jim Cregan and his band "Apart from Rod" as lead vocalist performing many of the hits that Jim had played on during his years as Rod Stewart’s guitarist. The band later became Cregan and co.

In 2016, Ben and Melissa were amicably divorced.

On 14 September 2019, Ben performed a charity concert at Wentworth golf club alongside Sir Rod Stewart, Ronnie Wood, Kenney Jones, Jim Cregan and members of Cregan and co at an event to raise funds for The Prostate Project.

On 2 April 2021, Mills and his long-term partner Layla King announced the birth of their first child, a son called Frederick King Collett-Mills.

On 6 September 2022, Ben and Layla announced the birth of their second child, a daughter called Penelope Rose Collett-Mills.

On 4 August 2024, Ben and Layla announced the birth of their third child, another daughter called Isabella Rose Collett-Mills.

== Discography ==
| Year | Album details | Chart peak positions | | Certifications | Sales |
| Year | Album details | UK | IRE | Certifications | Sales |
|---|---|---|---|---|---|
| 2007 | Picture of You: Released: 12 March 2007; Genre: Rock; Label: Sony BMG; Format: CD, digital download | 3 | 15 | United Kingdom: Gold | United Kingdom: 133,000 |
| 2010 | Freedom: Released: 8 March 2010; Label: Benjamel Records; Format: CD, digital download | 78 | – | | |
