= The Very Best of Dolly Parton =

Compilation album by Dolly Parton
- Released: March 7, 2007
- Recorded: 1966–1993
- Genres: Country; pop
- Labels: Legacy; Columbia
- Producer: Patrik Frisk

Dolly Parton chronology
Singer, Songwriter & Legendary Performer (2007)	The Very Best of Dolly Parton (2007)	16 Biggest Hits (2007)

The Very Best of Dolly Parton is a compilation album by Dolly Parton, released on March 7, 2007. It was certified platinum in Australia, Ireland and the United Kingdom.

== Commercial performance ==
The Very Best of Dolly Parton has sold over 742,495 copies in the UK as of August 2026.

== Track listing ==
1. "9 to 5" – 3:00
2. "I Will Always Love You" – 2:53
3. "Islands in the Stream" (with Kenny Rogers) – 4:09
4. "Jolene" – 2:41
5. "Coat of Many Colors" – 3:04
6. "My Tennessee Mountain Home" – 3:06
7. "Here You Come Again" – 2:53
8. "Baby I'm Burning" – 2:36
9. "Love Is Like a Butterfly" – 2:20
10. "The Bargain Store" – 2:42
11. "Potential New Boyfriend" – 3:36
12. "Everything's Beautiful (in its own Way) (with Willie Nelson) – 3:15
13. "Silver Threads and Golden Needles (with Tammy Wynette and Loretta Lynn) – 2:34
14. "To Know Him is to Love Him (with Linda Ronstadt and Emmylou Harris) – 3:49
15. "Why'd You Come in Here Lookin' Like That" – 2:32
16. "Romeo" (with Billy Ray Cyrus, Mary Chapin Carpenter, Pam Tillis, Kathy Mattea and Tanya Tucker) – 3:34
17. "Tennessee Homesick Blues" – 3:23
18. "Dumb Blonde" – 2:28
19. "Apple Jack" – 3:25
20. "Old Flames Can't Hold a Candle to You" – 3:24

== Charts ==
=== Weekly charts ===
Chart (2007–2026)	Peak position
Australian Albums (ARIA)	21
Australia On Replay (ARIA)	2
Austrian Albums (Ö3 Austria)	37
Belgian Albums (Ultratop Flanders)	24
Belgian Albums (Ultratop Wallonia)	193
Canadian Albums (Billboard)	8
Danish Albums (Hitlisten)	2
Dutch Albums (Album Top 100)	23
Greek Albums (IFPI)	4
Irish Albums (IRMA)	6
New Zealand Albums (RMNZ)	8
Norwegian Albums (VG-lista)	3
Scottish Albums (Official Charts)	6
Swedish Albums (Sverigetopplistan)	1
Swiss Albums (Schweizer Hitparade)	81
UK Albums (Official Charts)	8
UK Country Compilation Albums (Official Charts)	1
US Top Album Sales (Billboard)	40

=== Year-end charts ===
Chart (2007)	Position
Swedish Albums (Sverigetopplistan)	62
UK Albums (OCC)	80

== Certifications ==
Region	Certification	Certified units/sales
Australia (ARIA)	Platinum	70,000^{^}
Ireland (IRMA)	Platinum	15,000^{^}
New Zealand (RMNZ) tour edition	Platinum	15,000^{‡}
Sweden (GLF)	2× Platinum	60,000^{‡}
United Kingdom (BPI)	2× Platinum	742,495
^{^} Shipments figures based on certification alone.^{‡} Sales+streaming figures based on certification alone.
