= RyanDan =

Canadian musical duo (born 1979)

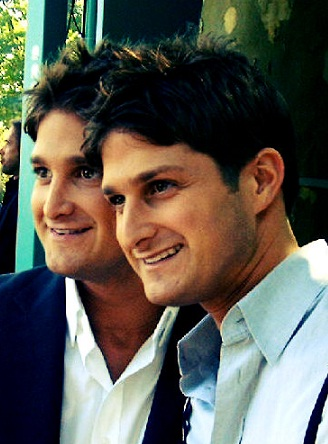

Background information
- Born: December 5, 1979 (age 46); Cincinnati, Ohio, U.S.
- Origin: Toronto, Ontario, Canada
- Genres: Operatic pop
- Years active: 2006–present
- Label: Universal Classics and Jazz
- Spinoff of: B4-4
- Members: Ryan Kowarsky; Dan Kowarsky

RyanDan (born December 5, 1979) is a Canadian musical, songwriting and production duo, consisting of identical twins Ryan and Dan Kowarsky, whose music is a mix of pop, opera, and classical.

The Kowarsky brothers were originally part of the boy band B4-4 (also known as Before Four). They later worked as a vocal duo known as RyanDan. They have also produced for a number of Canadian artists including Blake McGrath, Danny Fernandes, Tyler Medeiros, Mia Martina, Massari and others. They have also appeared as background vocals for Shania Twain in concert.

== Career ==
=== Career beginnings ===
Identical twins Ryan and Dan Kowarsky were born December 5, 1979, in Cincinnati, Ohio to Adele Gould and Paul Kowarsky. The youngest of five children in a Jewish family, they grew up in the Thornhill neighbourhood north of Toronto. Their father, Paul, a South African who attended King David Linksfield (a Jewish day school in Johannesburg, South Africa), is an operatic singer who frequently sang as a cantor in synagogues both in South Africa and after immigrating to Canada. Their mother, Adele was diagnosed with Parkinson's disease in 2004. In high school, Ryan and Dan shared the lead role in their school's production of Joseph and the Amazing Technicolor Dreamcoat.

=== In b4-4 / Before Four ===
At age 16, they presented themselves at the offices of Sony Music Canada, and attracted the attention of record company executives when they sang "Show Me the Way to Go Home" in the reception area. They were signed to a record contract soon after forming a boy band called b4-4 along with their friend Ohad Einbinder. They received a Juno Award nomination in 2001 for Best New Group, but lost to Nickelback. They also enjoyed some success in Germany as Before Four.

=== As RyanDan ===
They eventually wanted to cultivate a more adult sound and fan base, and in 2006, they moved to London. They recorded their album RyanDan with producer Steve Anderson, who has worked with Kylie Minogue and Paul McCartney. They cite opera singer Mario Lanza as a strong influence on their music.

Their debut self-titled album received critical acclaim including "The Face", which was co-penned by Stephan Moccio and for "Tears of an Angel" written by the duo in memory of their late niece, Tal, who died from a brain tumour at age four while they were recording the album on which it appears.

Their scheduled follow-up album in 2010 entitled Silence Speaks was postponed and never released. The album was renamed Imagine but also failed to be released on schedule in 2011 and then in 2012. One song, "Is Love Enough (To Save the World)" has been released on Canadian radio with an accompanying music video.

Ryan and Dan performed with Shania Twain during her Still the One show at Caesars Palace in Las Vegas which ended in December 2014. They have also performed with her at the Calgary Stampede and at Founders Week in Charlottetown, Prince Edward Island, Canada, on August 30, 2014.

== Music production ==
Ryan and Dan Kowarsky have also devoted their talents to production. Their experience includes songwriting efforts for several tracks on Blake McGrath's Time to Move, including "Relax", Mia Martina's "Latin Moon" and "Stereo Love", "Automatic" by Danny Fernandes, and a number of tracks for Tyler Medeiros.

== In popular culture ==
RyanDan's "Tears of an Angel", written for their niece diagnosed with cancer, was used in a group dance routine by dancers during episode 12 of season 10 of So You Think You Can Dance. The dance was designed by choreographer Bonnie Story who used the piece in an "anti-bullying" dance subject based on an actual bullying incident experienced by a friend of hers.

In 2007, they also appeared on the BBC daytime TV cooking reality show Ready Steady Cook as assistant chefs.

== Personal life ==
Ryan and Dan own a dog boarding camp just north of Toronto called Camp Cookstown.

== Discography ==
=== Albums ===
List of albums, with selected details, chart positions and certifications
Title	Album details	Peak chart positions							Certifications (sales threshold)
Title	Album details	CAN	AUS	BEL (Wa)	NED	SWE	UK	US Class.	Certifications (sales threshold)
RyanDan	Released: September 27, 2007 (Canada); Label: Universal/Decca; Format: CD, digital download	8	60	60	28	47	7	18	MC: Gold
Imagine	Released: March 18, 2014 (Canada); Label: Universal Music Canada; Format: CD, digital download	—	—	—	—	—	—	—	

=== Guest albums ===
- 2008: "The Water is Wide" (guest vocals) (Olivia Newton-John with Amy Sky and RyanDan) (appears in album A Celebration in Song: Olivia Newton-John & Friends)

=== Singles ===
List of singles, with selected chart positions
Title	Year	Peak	Album
Title	Year	UK	Album
"Like the Sun"	2007	69	RyanDan
"The Face"	2007	—	RyanDan
"High / O Holy Night"	2007	—	RyanDan
"Is Love Enough (To Save the World)"	2009	—	Non-album singles
"Open Arms"	2009	—	Non-album singles
"Tears of an Angel"	2010	—	Non-album singles

=== Songwriting and production credits ===
- 2010: "Relax" - Blake McGrath
- 2010: "Feel It" - Danny Fernandes ft. Shawn Desman
- 2010: "Girlfriend" - Tyler Medeiros ft. Danny Fernandes
- 2010: "Automatic" - Danny Fernandes ft. Belly
- 2011: "Latin Moon" - Mia Martina
- 2011: "Please Don't Go (Say I Love You)" - Tyler Medeiros
- 2011: "Stereo Love" - Mia Martina
- 2013: "Heartbreaker" - Mia Martina
- 2015: "Guilty as Sin" - Dan Talevski
- 2015: "My Religion" - Dan Talevski
- 2016: "Wicked" - Tyler Shaw
- 2016: "Knock Me Off My Feet" - Dan Talevski
- 2016: "Rocket" - Dan Talevski
- 2017: "Birthday Suit" - Dan Talevski
- 2018: "The Wire" - Dan Talevski
- 2019: "Home Alone" - Dan Talevski
- 2019: "If I Ain't Got You" - Dan Talevski
- 2019: "This Is How We Do It" - Dan Talevski
- 2019: "Too Close" - Ria Mae with Dan Talevski
- 2020: "Touch The Sky" - Dan Talevski
