= Picture of You (album) =

Studio album by Ben Mills
- Released: 12 March 2007
- Recorded: 2007
- Genre: Rock, pop rock
- Length: 48:22
- Label: Sony BMG
- Producer: Brian Rawling, Paul Meehan

Ben Mills chronology
Picture of You (2007)	Freedom (2010)

Picture of You is the debut studio album by English singer-songwriter Ben Mills, who finished in third place on the third series of The X Factor in December 2006. The album was released on 12 March 2007 and entered the UK Albums Chart at number three with first week sales of 63,342, before dropping to number 14 the following week.

== Background ==
On 24 January 2007, six weeks after finishing in third place on the third series of The X Factor, it was announced that Mills had signed a five-album record deal with Sony BMG, who had also signed up winner Leona Lewis and runner-up Ray Quinn, and would be releasing his debut album in March of that year. The album was announced to be containing both original material and covers. In a statement, Mills said, "The X Factor was the perfect platform to gain recognition and I'm really enjoying writing and recording this album."

== Critical reception ==
The album received mostly negative reviews from music critics. Entertainment Scene 360's Eleanor O'Donnell, who voted for Mills every week on The X Factor, stated that "The flouncy new image coupled with these weak, busy yet placid songs and soulless vocal performances on his debut album makes Mills an artist I will not continue to support in the future and this an album I cannot recommend." Chris Jones of BBC Music wrote that "...the relentless freak show-cum-faux 'talent' show that we love to gawp at on a Saturday night seems to have actually found someone who may survive the cruel seas of tabloid popularity and become a voice to remember." In a 2.5/5 star review, Sharon Mawer of AllMusic commended Mills for his versions of "Maggie May" and "With a Little Help from My Friends" and "Somebody to Love", but admitted that his original songs "...were not of the same quality as the covers, nearly half of which he had sung on the show, thereby making his versions well known in their own right."

== Track listing ==
1. "Beside You"
2. "Amazed"
3. "Nothing but the Truth"
4. "Maggie May"
5. "Anytime You Fall"
6. "Love Waits for Me"
7. "Don't Wanna Miss a Thing"
8. "Somebody to Love"
9. "The Last to Fall"
10. "Bring It On Home to Me"
11. "Picture of You"
12. "With a Little Help from My Friends"

== Credits and personnel ==
(Credits taken from AllMusic and Picture of You's liner notes.)

- Dick Beetham - mastering
- Hamish Brown - photography
- David Daniels - cello
- Julian Deane - guitar
- John Lennon - composer
- Perry Mason - leader
- Cliff Masterson - conductor, string arrangements
- Paul Meehan - producer
- Freddie Mercury - composer
- Ben Mills - piano, primary artist
- Pino Palladino - bass
- Martin Quittenton - composer
- Brian Rawling - producer
- Carmen Reece - background vocals
- Philip Rose - string engineer
- Jackie Shave - violin
- Alex E. Smith - programming
- Ian Thomas - drums
- Andy Wallace - keyboards
- Diane Warren - composer
- Bruce White - viola
- Shena Winchester - backing vocals
- Tim Woodcock - programming

== Charts and certifications ==
=== Charts ===
Chart (2007)	Peak position
Irish Albums (IRMA)	15
Scottish Albums (OCC)	3
UK Albums (OCC)	3

=== Certifications ===
Region	Certification	Certified units/sales
United Kingdom (BPI)	Gold	100,000^{*}
^{*} Sales figures based on certification alone.

== Release history ==
Country	Date	Format	Label
Ireland	12 March 2007	CD, digital download	Sony BMG
United Kingdom	12 March 2007	CD, digital download	Sony BMG
