= Time to Move =

Studio album by Blake McGrath
- Released: November 2, 2010
- Genres: Pop, dance
- Length: 41:32
- Label: Interscope

Blake McGrath chronology
Time to Move (2010)	Love Revolution (2013)

Singles from Time to Move
- 1. "The Night (Only Place to Go)" Released: 2010; 2. "Relax" Released: 2010; 3. "Stage Fright" Released: 2011; 4. "Love Sick" Released: 2011; 5. "Burn the Floor" Released: 2011

Time to Move is the first studio album by Canadian singer Blake McGrath. It was released in Canada on November 2, 2010. Five singles were released from the album.

The album was rated 2.5 out of five stars by AllMusic.

== Track listing ==
No.	Title	Producer(s)	Length
1.	"Time to Move" (Intro)	Alex "Pilzbury" Vujic	1:14
2.	"Relax"	Alex "Pilzbury" Vujic; Written by: Ryan Kowarski; Dan Kowarski; Adam Alexander	3:07
3.	"The Night (Only Place to Go)"	Dan "Spinz" Forrest; Written by: Blake McGrath; Jonathan "JDiggz" Poirier	3:42
4.	"Penthouse" (featuring Trish)	Alex "Pilzbury" Vujic	3:24
5.	"Stage Fright"	Dan "Spinz" Forrest; Written by: Andres R. Gill Jr. Zachary E. Maxey	3:19
6.	"Love Sick"	Dan "Spinz" Forrest	3:39
7.	"Runway"	Dan "Spinz" Forrest; Luther A. Brown	3:35
8.	"You Got It"	Dan "Spinz" Forrest	3:22
9.	"Hate the Rain"	Dan "Spinz" Forrest; Andres R. Gill Jr. Zachary E. Maxey; Alexandra Kane; Omar Lunan	4:06
10.	"Burn the Floor"	Richard Singh	2:48
11.	"Turn It Up"	Luther A. Brown; Richard Miranda	4:23
12.	"Don't Stress"	Dan "Spinz" Forrest; Written by: Jenson Vaughan	3:18
13.	"Lullaby"	Alex "Pilzbury" Vujic	3:35

No.	Title	Length
14.	"Peak"	3:07

== Other Credits ==
- "Stage Fright" - Guitar: Chris Perry
- "Hate the Rain" - Music: Alexandra Kane
- "Turn It Up" - Music: Ritchie of Soundsmith Productions
- "Lullaby" - Bass Guitar: Josh Cohen / Guitar: Justin Abedin

== Stage Fright Tour ==
In Spring of 2011 McGrath toured throughout Canada at 25 different venues under the tour name Stage Fright Tour.

== Charts ==
Chart	Peak position
Canadian Albums Chart	39
