= RyanDan (album) =

Studio album by RyanDan
- Released: 27 September 2007
- Genre: Adult contemporary, pop-classical
- Label: Universal
- Producer: Steve Anderson

RyanDan chronology
RyanDan (2007)	Silence Speaks (2010)

Professional ratings
Review scores
Source	Rating
Allmusic	3.5/5 stars

RyanDan is the debut album by Canadian duo RyanDan, released 27 September 2007 in the United Kingdom by Universal Music. It was produced by Steve Anderson.

When it reached number seven on the UK Albums Chart in the week after its release, it made RyanDan the first identical-twin duo to hit the top ten.

== Track listing ==
1. "Like the Sun" (4:26)
2. "The Face" (3:26)
3. "High" (4:17)
4. "The Prayer" 4:26
5. "In Us I Believe" (3:17)
6. "Wind Beneath My Wings" (4:15)
7. "I'll Be There" (4:38)
8. "Bring Him Home" (3:53)
9. "Dentro Me" (3:42)
10. "Stay with You" (3:34)
11. "You Needed Me" (3:49)
12. "Tears of an Angel" (3:29)
13. "Comme le soleil (Like the Sun)" (4:24)

== Charts ==
Chart performance for RyanDan
Chart (2012)	Peak position
Australian Albums (ARIA)	60
Belgian Albums Chart (Flanders)	60
Canadian Albums Chart	8
Dutch Albums Chart	28
Hong Kong Albums Chart	4
Swedish Albums Chart	47
UK Albums Chart	7
US Billboard 200	18
