= One Chance (album) =

Studio album by Paul Potts
- Released: 16 July 2007
- Genres: Classical, pop opera
- Labels: Syco, Sony BMG, Columbia
- Producers: David Kreuger, Per Magnusson, Quiz & Larossi, Nigel Wright, Steve Mac

Paul Potts chronology
One Chance (2007)	Passione (2009)

Professional ratings
Review scores
Source	Rating
Allmusic	3.5/5 stars

One Chance is the debut album from British tenor Paul Potts. He won Britain's Got Talent on 17 June 2007, and the album was released on 16 July 2007 by Syco Music.

== Commercial performance ==
The album reached number one on the UK Albums Chart. The album had been at #1 from its release until 12 August, and it was certified platinum.

In Australia, the album opened at #4 on the ARIA Top 50 Albums Chart. It has so far reached Gold Status (35,000 copies sold). Four weeks later (2 September 2007), it reached #1.

In New Zealand, the album debuted at #1 on 6 August 2007 and was certified Gold in its first week, selling over 7,500 copies. The album was certified Platinum in its second week on the chart selling over 15,000 copies, and 2× Platinum after four weeks with sales of over 30,000 copies. The album spent twenty-three weeks on the chart, including six consecutive weeks at #1.

== Track listing ==
1. "Nessun dorma" - composed by Giacomo Puccini, from the opera Turandot
2. "Time to Say Goodbye" - composed by Francesco Sartori and lyrics by Lucio Quarantotto
3. "Amapola" - composed by Joseph LaCalle
4. "Everybody Hurts (Ognuno Soffre)" - composed by R.E.M.
5. "Caruso" - composed by Lucio Dalla
6. "Nella Fantasia" - composed by Ennio Morricone and lyrics by Chiara Ferraù
7. "Por Ti Sere" - composed by Rolf Løvland and lyrics by Brendan Graham
8. "A Mi Manera" - composed by Jacques Revaux
9. "Cavatina" - composed by Stanley Myers and lyrics by Cleo Laine
10. "The Music of the Night" - composed by Andrew Lloyd Webber and lyrics by Charles Hart and Richard Stilgoe, from the musical The Phantom of the Opera

== Charts ==
=== Weekly charts ===
Chart (2007–08)	Peak position
Australian Albums (ARIA)	1
Austrian Albums (Ö3 Austria)	3
Belgian Albums (Ultratop Flanders)	26
Canadian Albums (Billboard)	2
Danish Albums (Hitlisten)	1
Dutch Albums (Album Top 100)	4
Finnish Albums (Suomen virallinen lista)	17
French Albums (SNEP)	100
German Albums (Offizielle Top 100)	1
Hungarian Albums (MAHASZ)	38
Irish Albums (IRMA)	1
Korean Albums Chart	1
Mexican Albums (AMPROFON)	11
Mexican International Albums (AMPROFON)	3
New Zealand Albums (RMNZ)	1
Norwegian Albums (VG-lista)	1
Scottish Albums (Official Charts)	1
Spanish Albums (Promusicae)	9
Swedish Albums (Sverigetopplistan)	1
UK Albums (Official Charts)	1
US Billboard 200	23

=== Year-end charts ===
Chart (2007)	Position
Australian Albums (ARIA)	27
Dutch Albums (Album Top 100)	20
Swedish Albums (Sverigetopplistan)	2
UK Albums (OCC)	36

Chart (2008)	Position
Austrian Albums (Ö3 Austria)	18
Canadian Albums (Billboard)	18
Dutch Albums (Album Top 100)	84
German Albums (Offizielle Top 100)	3
Swedish Albums (Sverigetopplistan)	68
Swiss Albums (Schweizer Hitparade)	35
US Billboard 200	175

Chart (2009)	Position
German Albums (Offizielle Top 100)	90

== Certifications and sales ==
Region	Certification	Certified units/sales
Australia (ARIA)	Platinum	70,000^{^}
Austria (IFPI Austria)	Platinum	20,000^{*}
Canada (Music Canada)	Platinum	100,000^{^}
Denmark (IFPI Danmark)	2× Platinum	60,000^{^}
Germany (BVMI)	5× Platinum	1,000,000^{^}
Ireland (IRMA)	Platinum	15,000^{^}
Mexico (AMPROFON)	Gold	50,000^{^}
Netherlands (NVPI)	Platinum	70,000^{^}
New Zealand (RMNZ)	2× Platinum	30,000^{^}
Spain (Promusicae)	Gold	40,000^{^}
Sweden (GLF)	2× Platinum	80,000^{^}
Switzerland (IFPI Switzerland)	Gold	15,000^{^}
United Kingdom (BPI) Christmas Edition	Gold	188,000
United Kingdom (BPI)	Platinum	357,000
United States	—	425,000
Summaries
Worldwide	—	3,000,000
^{*} Sales figures based on certification alone.^{^} Shipments figures based on certification alone.
