= Paul Potts =

British tenor (born 1970)

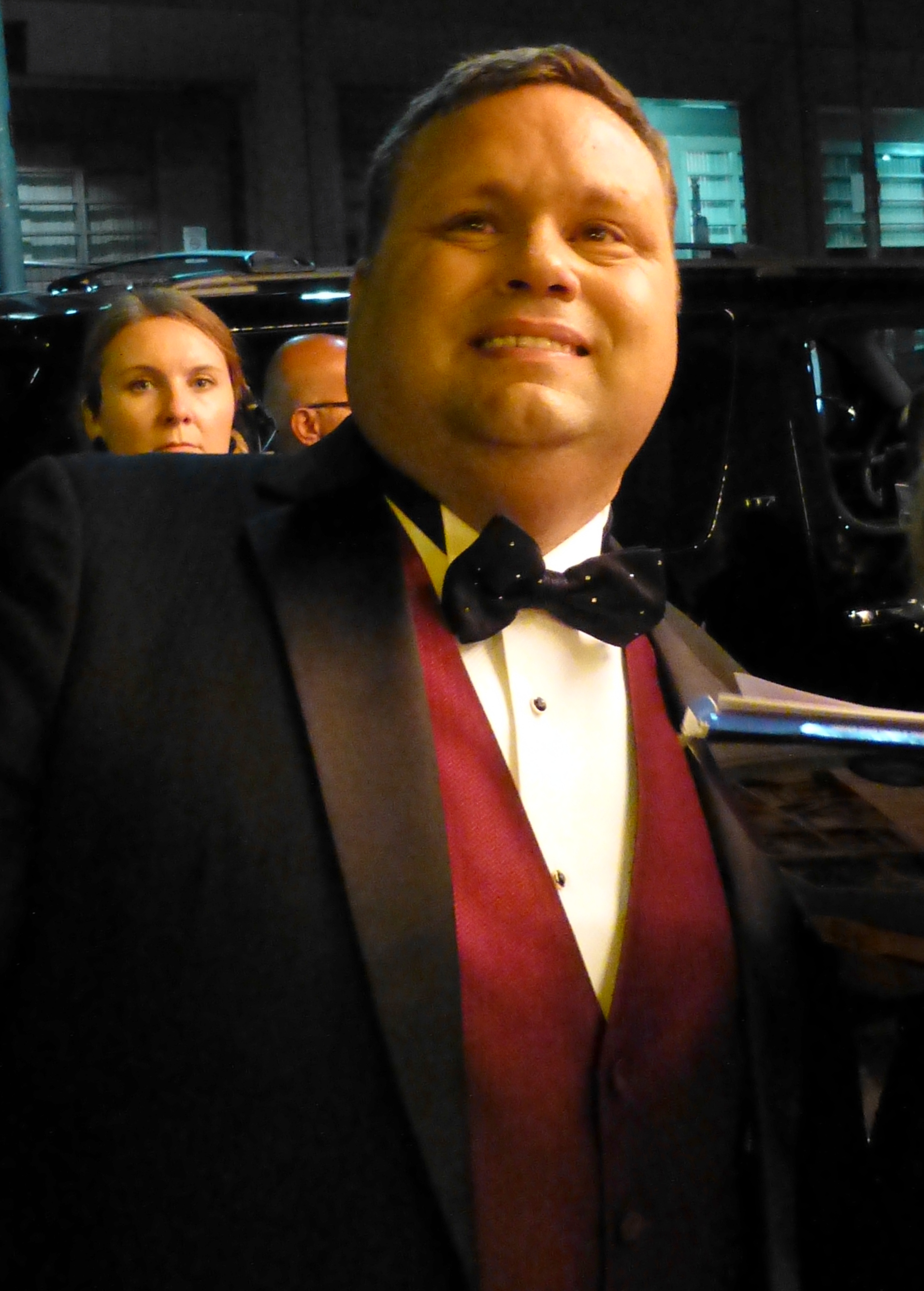
- Potts at the 2013 Toronto International Film Festival

Background information
- Born: Paul Robert Potts; 13 October 1970 (age 56); Bristol, England
- Genres: Classical; pop opera
- Occupation: Tenor
- Years active: 1999–present
- Labels: Syco; Columbia; Sony Germany
- Website: paulpottsofficial.com

Paul Robert Potts (born 13 October 1970) is a British tenor. In 2007, he won the first series of ITV's Britain's Got Talent with his performance of "Nessun dorma", an aria from Puccini's opera Turandot. As a singer of operatic pop music, Potts recorded the album One Chance, which topped sales charts in 13 countries. Before winning Britain's Got Talent, Potts was a manager at Carphone Warehouse. He had been a Bristol city councillor from 1996 until 2003, and performed in amateur opera from 1999 to 2003.

== Early life ==
Paul Potts was born on 13 October 1970 in Kingswood, Bristol, and raised in nearby Fishponds by his English father Roland, a bus driver, and Welsh mother, Yvonne (née Higgins), a supermarket cashier. He has two brothers and one sister.

Potts attended St Mary Redcliffe and Temple School, where he developed his love of singing. He also sang with the choir at Chester Park Junior School and with the choirs at several Bristol churches, including Christ Church. Potts said in interviews that he had been bullied in school, and that experience may have made him lack self-confidence. He has also said that his voice had always been a source of solace when he was bullied.

After he left school in 1987, Potts had various jobs including working at Waitrose and Tesco; he also worked part-time at Debenhams. At the time of his Britain's Got Talent appearance, he was working in The Carphone Warehouse.

In 1993, Potts earned a B.A. (Bachelor of Arts) Honours degree in humanities from University College Plymouth St Mark & St John. In 1996, Potts was elected in a council by-election to represent the Eastville ward of Bristol City Council as a Liberal Democrat councillor; he was the youngest member of Bristol City Council and served until 2003.

After winning Britain's Got Talent, Potts took a six-month sabbatical from his job and resigned on 5 March 2008.

== Singing career ==
Potts first sang opera in the minor roles of the Prince of Persia and the Herald in Puccini's Turandot for Bath Opera, an amateur company, in 1999. He then performed leading roles on four occasions: Don Basilio in Mozart's Marriage of Figaro in 2000; Don Carlos in Verdi's Don Carlos in 2001; Don Ottavio in Mozart's Don Giovanni in 2003; and Radames in Verdi's Aida in 2003. He also performed the role of the Chevalier des Grieux in Puccini's Manon Lescaut for the Southgate Opera Company in London, an amateur company, in May 2003. Additionally, he sang with a small ensemble from the Royal Philharmonic in front of an audience of 15,000 and toured northern Italy as a soloist as part of his music classes there.

In several interviews, Potts revealed that he performed Aida despite doctors' wishes to remove an adrenal tumour they had discovered during his illness from a burst appendix, and shortly after the tumour surgery performed Manon Lescaut. Potts broke his collarbone and suffered whiplash in a bicycle accident in 2003. The mishap and financial difficulties that followed led him to enter Britain's Got Talent despite not having sung in years.

=== Britain's Got Talent ===
Potts auditioned for Simon Cowell's new talent show Britain's Got Talent at the Wales Millennium Centre in Cardiff, Wales on 17 March 2007. The audition was televised on ITV in the UK on 9 June 2007. Potts sang the full rendition of Giacomo Puccini's "Nessun dorma," which was condensed for broadcast. His rendition of the aria brought looks of awe from the judges. Potts received a standing ovation from the audience of 2,000 people. The YouTube video clip from the show has had more than 199 million views as of January 2026.

In the semi-final on 14 June 2007, Potts performed the main verses of Andrea Bocelli's "Time To Say Goodbye." He progressed to the final after receiving the highest public vote in that show. He performed "Nessun dorma" again for his finale on 17 June 2007, as well as an encore after he won the competition. Potts defeated the bookmakers' co-favourite Connie Talbot, and received the highest percentage of two million votes cast to win £100,000. He then performed Sarah Brightman's "Nella Fantasia" at the Royal Variety Performance on 3 December 2007, in front of Queen Elizabeth II.

On 3 December 2012, he was invited to celebrate 100 years of the Royal Variety Performance alongside Spelbound, Diversity and 2009 finalist Stavros Flatley. Together they performed a dance routine finishing with Potts singing "Nessun Dorma" with Flatley dancing to the song.

=== Questions about amateur status ===
Shortly before the Britain's Got Talent final in June 2007, the programme was criticised for representing Potts as a simple mobile-phone salesman, when he had appeared with the Royal Philharmonic Orchestra and had plans for a summer tour with it. He was accused of being an experienced performer who was reaping the benefit of professional training. Potts responded that he had never worked as a professional singer. He had paid for lessons, but everyone taking part in the show had had some training. He had not claimed to be untutored, but had never performed any concert for pay and was therefore an amateur. He also said that the Pavarotti masterclass he attended in Italy was paid for from his own savings. His comments were confirmed by the singing teacher who gave him lessons until illness caused Potts to give up in 2003.

=== After Britain's Got Talent ===
In the United States, he was profiled on a National Public Radio programme called Day to Day, and appeared live on NBC's programme Today.

In July 2007, Potts performed "Nessun dorma" at a Katherine Jenkins concert at Margam Park, Wales. On 16 July 2007, his debut album One Chance was released in the UK, and claimed the No. 1 spot in the UK Album Chart the following week. In December 2007, Prime Minister Gordon Brown presented Potts with a platinum disc for having sold 2,000,000 copies of his album.

On 13 December 2007, he performed in Leipzig in the live television broadcast of the 13th annual José Carreras Gala, accompanied by the Deutsches Filmorchester Babelsberg under the direction of Scott Lawton. In January he began a series of 97 concerts in 85 cities across 23 countries. This included three outdoor classical music concerts with the Finnish violinist Linda Brava and the Prague Philharmonic Orchestra at Sofiero Palace, Sundbyholms Castle and Slottskogsvallen from 24 to 26 July. In the semi-finals of the 2009 series of Britain's Got Talent, Potts appeared in a comeback performance.

Potts was invited to appear on an episode of The Oprah Winfrey Show about YouTube, a site where clips of his performances had been viewed over 92 million times as of April 2012; as of April 2009, his first appearance on Britain's Got Talent was the fourth most viewed YouTube video in the UK. On 24 November 2007, Potts was interviewed on the National Public Radio programme Weekend Edition. On 15 August 2008, he performed before the German football season opening match between Bayern Munich and Hamburger SV in front of 69,000 visitors as well as on 2 September 2008 during the farewell game for Oliver Kahn.

In July 2008, Deutsche Telekom began using a TV and cinema advertisement centred on his Britain's Got Talent performance. In October 2008, Paul Potts sang in Japanese TV advertisements for Ryukakusan Direct throat medicine. Potts received two nominations at the Echo Awards 2009 in Germany: Best International Male Artist and Album of the Year. He won the 2009 Echo Award for Best International Male Artist on 21 February 2009. On 22 April 2009, Potts was the guest co-host on the Australian television programme The Morning Show with Kylie Gillies. Expanding his talent to the online world, Potts performed an exclusive in-studio performance for AOL Sessions in 2009. He collaborated with Swedish singer Carola Häggkvist on her Christmas album Christmas in Bethlehem, singing "O Holy Night". Potts has appeared twice on the popular Korean Talent TV show Star King, first in 2008 and once again in 2010.

He participated in the soundtrack of the 2009 Korean historical drama Queen Seondeok, singing two major characters, Deokman and Yushin's love theme "Passo Dopo Passo" in Italian, meaning "Step by Step".

He also performed a duet with Hayley Westenra, Sei Con Me, featured in his 2009 album Passione.

Potts was in Toronto on 10 November 2010 performing a "flash opera" at the Union Subway Station to a moderately-sized crowd and finished to loud applause.

In 2013 Potts appeared on the Korean television programme Qualifying Man. Then on 9 August 2014 he appeared in Durban, South Africa alongside SA's Got Talent winner James Bhemgee and Holland's Got Talent winner Amira Willighagen.

In the summer of 2016 Potts took on two full length opera roles for the first time in his professional career. He played the role of Cavaradossi in Puccini's Tosca at Summer Sessions at Chiswick House on 15 and 16 June. Then in Hungary he played the role of Steuermann (Steersman) in Szeged Open Air Festivals' production of Richard Wagner's Der fliegende Holländer on 1 and 2 July.

In September 2017, Potts won the 320th episode of the South-Korean television music competition Immortal Songs: Singing the Legend, in a duet with Bae Da-hae.

In September 2018, Potts was the runner-up on King of Mask Singer as "Justice Bao".

=== Other appearances ===
In 2019, Potts competed in America's Got Talent: The Champions, reaching the final 12, but did not secure a place among the top 5 finalists.

In 2022, he competed in The Masked Singer (German TV series) season 6 as a koala: he was eliminated in the third show.

In January 2024, Potts performed the role of Faust in Ken Hill's Phantom of the Opera for 16 performances at The Orb Theatre in Tokyo, Japan. He was invited to perform an encore performance of "Nessun Dorma" at the end of two of these performances.

== Personal life ==
Potts met his wife Julie-Ann in an Internet chat room in 2001. They were married in May 2003.

== Discography ==
=== Studio albums ===
| Title | Album details | Peak chart positions | | | | | | | | | | | | Certifications |
| Title | Album details | UK | AUS | AUT | CAN | DEN | GER | IRE | NOR | NZ | SWE | SWI | US | Certifications |
|---|---|---|---|---|---|---|---|---|---|---|---|---|---|---|
| One Chance | Released: 16 July 2007; Label: Syco, Columbia; Format: Digital download, CD | 1 | 1 | 3 | 1 | 1 | 1 | 1 | 1 | 1 | 1 | 4 | 23 | BPI: Platinum; ARIA: Platinum; BVMI: 5× Platinum; GLF: 2× Platinum |
| Passione | Released: 1 June 2009; Label: Syco, Columbia; Format: Digital download, CD | 5 | 7 | 5 | 4 | 6 | 3 | 15 | — | 1 | 5 | 9 | 33 | ARIA: Gold; GLF: Gold |
| Cinema Paradiso | Released: 15 October 2010; Label: Sony Music Entertainment; Format: Digital download, CD | — | — | 33 | 65 | 17 | 40 | — | — | — | 9 | 68 | — | |
| One Chance: The Incredible True Story of Paul Potts Motion Picture Soundtrack | Released: 21 October 2013; Label: Sony Music Entertainment; Format: Digital download, CD | 33 | — | — | — | — | 40 | — | — | 2 | — | — | — | |
| Home | Released: 12 October 2014; Label: Sony Music Entertainment; Format: Digital download, CD | — | 36 | — | — | — | — | — | — | 36 | — | — | — | |
| On Stage | Released: 6 October 2017; Label: Right Track Distribution; Format: Digital download, CD | — | — | — | — | — | — | — | — | — | — | — | — | |
| Winter Dreams | Released: 23 November 2018; Label: Paul Potts Recordings; Format: Digital download, CD | — | — | — | — | — | — | — | — | — | — | — | — | |
"—" denotes album that did not chart or was not released.

=== Singles ===
| Year | Title | Peak chart positions | | | | | | Album |
| Year | Title | UK | AUT | DEN | GER | SWE | SWI | Album |
|---|---|---|---|---|---|---|---|---|
| 2007 | "Nessun dorma" (Note: "Nessun Dorma" got the 19th best-selling single of 2008 in Germany and was certified as Gold for selling more than 150,000 copies. In the UK, the song charted due to digital downloads only.) | 100 | 8 | 13 | 2 | 52 | 12 | One Chance |

== Film adaptation ==
The Weinstein Company has adapted Potts's life in a film called One Chance, with James Corden starring as Potts. The script is by Justin Zackham and the film is directed by David Frankel, the director of The Devil Wears Prada.

== One Chance: A Memoir ==
In 2013, Potts' memoir, One Chance, was published by Weinstein Books, as a companion to the 2013 film of the same name. One Chance describes Potts’ difficult childhood, enduring passion for music, Britain's Got Talent win, and subsequent professional career. One Chance was featured as a top film tie-in of the year by Publishers Weekly, where it was described as a "fascinating tale...of the shy Welsh (he was from Bristol) store manager who seized his dreams and won worldwide audiences."

== Notes ==
Achievements
| New show | Winner of Britain's Got Talent; 2007 | Succeeded by George Sampson |
