= Hard-Fi discography =

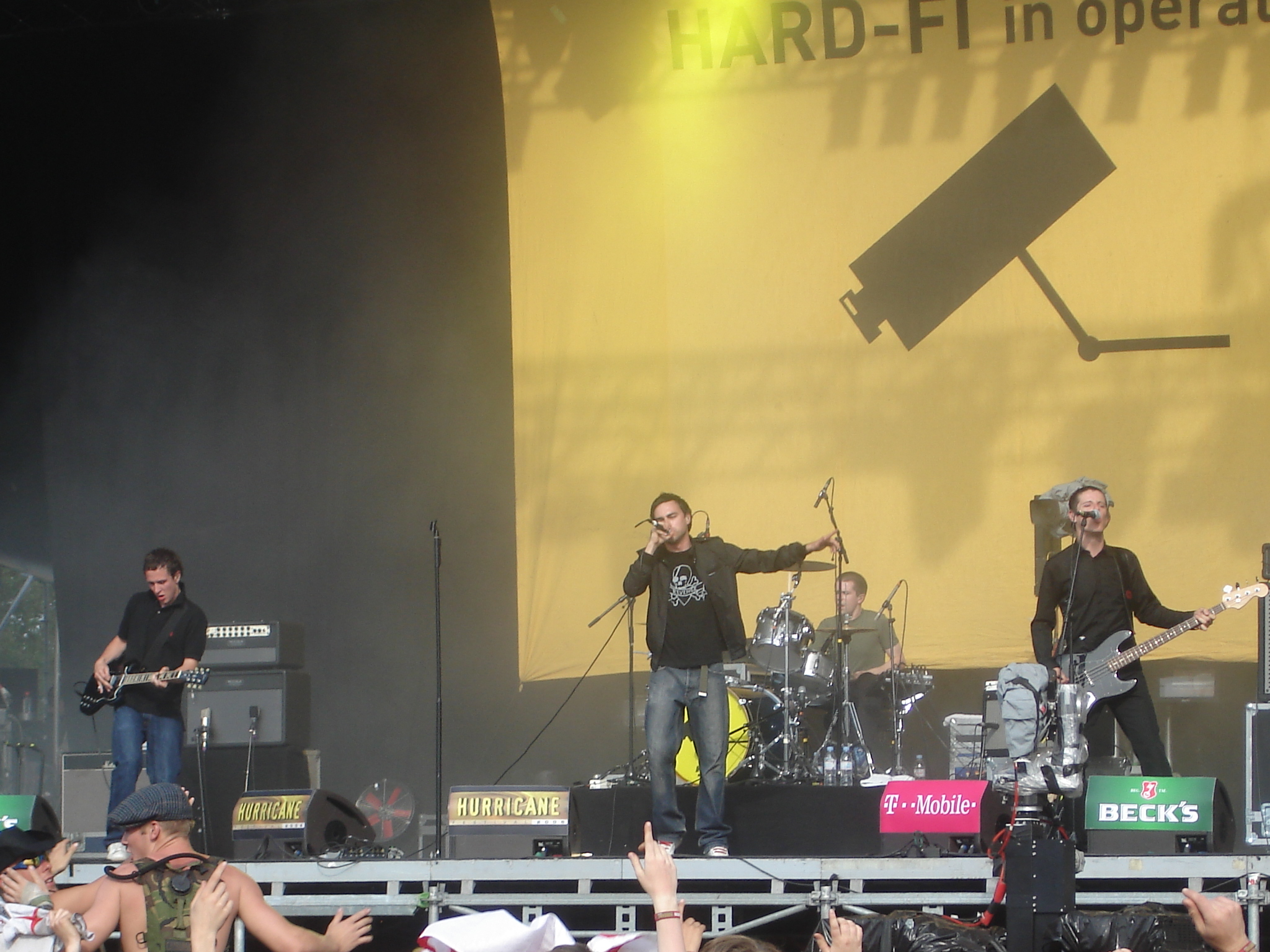
- Hard-Fi at the Hurricane Festival in June 2006
- Studio albums: 4
- Extended plays: 1
- Live albums: 1
- Compilation albums: 3
- Singles: 12
- Video albums: 1
- Remix albums: 1

The discography of English indie rock band Hard-Fi comprises four studio albums, one live album, one compilation album, one remix album, one extended play and 11 singles.

== Albums ==
=== Studio albums ===
List of albums, with selected chart positions, sales, and certifications
Title	Details	Peak chart positions										Certifications
Title	Details	UK	AUS	AUT	FRA	GER	IRE	NLD	SCO	SWI	US Heat	Certifications
Stars of CCTV	Released: 4 July 2005; Label: Necessary / Atlantic (#5046786912); Format: CD, digital download	1	—	47	68	20	5	91	1	—	17	BPI: 2× Platinum; IRMA: 2× Platinum
Once Upon a Time in the West	Released: 3 September 2007; Label: Necessary / Atlantic (#5144229602); Format: CD, digital download	1	63	51	99	39	3	73	2	49	28	BPI: Gold; IRMA: Gold
Killer Sounds	Released: 19 August 2011; Label: Necessary / Atlantic; Format: CD, digital download	9	— (Note: Killer Sounds did not enter the Australian ARIA Albums Chart but peaked at number 15 on the ARIA Hitseekers Chart.)	—	—	—	77	—	13	77	—	
Sweating Someone Else's Fever	Released: 19 June 2026; Label: Hard-Fi 2.0 / V2; Format: CD, LP, digital download	58	—	—	—	—	—	—	7	—	—	
"—" denotes a recording that did not chart or was not released in that territory.

=== Compilation albums ===
List of albums, with selected chart positions, sales, and certifications
Title	Details	Peak chart positions
Title	Details	UK
Hard-Fi: Best of 2004–2014	Released: 26 January 2014; Label: Warner; Format: CD, digital download	130

=== Live albums ===
Title	Details	Peak chart positions	
Title	Details	UK	SCO
In Operation	Released: 8 May 2006; Label: Necessary / Atlantic (#5101138285); Format: CD, digital download	62	74
Once Upon a Time in December	Released: 5 December 2007; Label: Necessary / Atlantic; Format: CD, digital download	—	—

== Extended plays ==
Title	Details
Sessions@AOL	Released: 26 December 2005; Label: Necessary; Format: digital download
Hard-Fi Live from the Bowery Ballroom NYC	Released: 6 June 2006; Label: Necessary; Format: digital download
Don’t Go Making Plans	Released: 15 November 2024; Label: Ignition; Format: digital download

== Singles ==
List of singles, with selected chart positions, showing year released and album name
Title	Year	Peak chart positions										Certifications	Album
Title	Year	UK	AUS	GER	IRE	ITA	NLD	POL	SCO	SWE	US Alt	Certifications	Album
"Cash Machine"	2005	14	91	75	39	25	87	45	16	60	15		Stars of CCTV
"Tied Up Too Tight"	2005	15	—	—	—	—	—	—	16	—	—		Stars of CCTV
"Hard to Beat"	2005	9	92	80	—	—	73	—	11	—	34	BPI: Gold	Stars of CCTV
"Living for the Weekend"	2005	15	—	—	—	—	—	—	19	—	—	BPI: Gold	Stars of CCTV
"Better Do Better"	2006	14	—	—	—	—	—	—	10	—	—		Stars of CCTV
"Suburban Knights"	2007	7	—	79	15	98	99	35	7	—	—		Once Upon a Time in the West
"Can't Get Along (Without You)"	2007	45	—	—	—	—	—	—	24	—	—		Once Upon a Time in the West
"I Shall Overcome"	2008	35	—	—	—	—	—	—	7	—	—		Once Upon a Time in the West
"Good for Nothing"	2011	51	—	—	—	—	— (Note: "Good for Nothing" did not enter the Netherlands Singles Chart but peaked on the Dutch Tipparade Chart at number seven.)	—	55	—	—		Killer Sounds
"Fire in the House"	2011	170	—	—	—	—	—	—	—	—	—		Killer Sounds
"Bring It On"	2011	—	—	—	—	—	—	—	—	—	—		Killer Sounds
"Don’t Go Making Plans"	2024	— (Note: "Don’t Go Making Plans" did not enter the UK Single Chart, but peaked at number 21 on the UK Singles Sales Chart.)	—	—	—	—	—	—	—	—	—		Don’t Go Making Plans / Sweating Someone Else's Fever
"Always and Forever"	2024	—	—	—	—	—	—	—	—	—	—		Don’t Go Making Plans / Sweating Someone Else's Fever
"Don't Need You"	2024	—	—	—	—	—	—	—	—	—	—		Don’t Go Making Plans
"They Ain't Your Friends"	2026	—	—	—	—	—	—	—	—	—	—		Sweating Someone Else's Fever
"Looking For Fun"	2026	—	—	—	—	—	—	—	—	—	—		Sweating Someone Else's Fever
"Digo Nada"	2026	—	—	—	—	—	—	—	—	—	—		Sweating Someone Else's Fever
"—" denotes a recording that did not chart or was not released in that territory.

== Other charting songs ==
Title	Year	Peak chart positions	Album
Title	Year	POL	Album
"Move On Now"	2005	36	Stars of CCTV

== Other appearances ==
Title	Year	Album
"Help Me Please" (Note: "Help Me Please" on Help!: A Day in the Life is slightly different from the version on Once Upon a Time in the West.)	2005	Help!: A Day in the Life
"Levi Stubbs' Tears" (Billy Bragg cover)	2006	Unreleased
"Toxic" (Britney Spears cover)	2007	Radio 1 Established 1967
"Living for the Weekend" (instrumental)	2007	Easy Instrumental Hits Vol. 50
"Hard to Beat" (Xfm Live Sessions version)	2008	Xfm Debut Sessions
