= Hard-Fi: Best of 2004–2014 =

Greatest hits album by Hard-Fi
- Released: 27 January 2014
- Recorded: 2004–2013
- Genre: Indie rock; alternative rock
- Label: Warner
- Producer: Wolsey White; Richard Archer

Hard-Fi chronology
Killer Sounds (2011)	Hard-Fi: Best of 2004–2014 (2014)

Hard-Fi: Best of 2004–2014 is a greatest hits album by English alternative rock band Hard-Fi.

== Background ==
After a four-year gap between the release of Hard-Fi's second album Once Upon a Time in the West (2007) and their third album Killer Sounds (2011), Richard Archer told Gigwise in March 2012 that the band were hoping to release their next album in a shorter interval, "We want it to be sooner than the last one, you know, that was like just ridiculous, so we want it to be... We thought that we've got to come back with something fairly soon. There's no deadline on it because it's just there's no point, there's so many other factors involved, but we do definitely want to at least have material ready to roll if we need it." The band released some samples of studio material from their upcoming album via their official Facebook page in March 2013. On 6 May 2013, Hard-Fi announced via Facebook that Phillips had left the band in order to concentrate on 'different things'.

On 27 November, it was announced that Hard-Fi would be releasing a greatest hits compilation album called Hard-Fi: Best of 2004–2014. The track list was revealed and the album will be released on 26 January 2014. The following day, in another Facebook statement, the band said: "We were approached by Warner records about this and decided to get involved. This way we had some control over the content and presentation. The main CD will feature all the singles plus some of our favourite album tracks, the Axwell remix of 'Hard To Beat', and the favourite b-side (as voted by you lot) 'You & Me' and a new track, 'Move Over'. There is also a limited 'Deluxe' CD version which is packed with alt versions of tracks, rarities, b-sides and some of our favourite remixes. All the limited Deluxe CD albums will be signed by us. Keep tuned in as we will have exclusive previews of "Move Over" and news of a one off event.............."

== Critical reception ==
The compilation has been given favourable reviews, TheGayUK's Chris Jones said: "Hard-Fi are masters of social realism in their lyrics and this collection of hits is a reminder that the band provide a great soundtrack to the streets of urban Britain. It’s music for working-class people that has clearly resonated over the years. Hard-Fi may be underdogs of the music scene, but their songs are better than many other indie-pop bands and this is a five star collection worthy of investing in."

== Track listing ==
1. "Cash Machine" (from Stars of CCTV)
2. "Tied Up Too Tight" (from Stars of CCTV)
3. "Hard to Beat" (from Stars of CCTV)
4. "Living for the Weekend" (from Stars of CCTV)
5. "Better Do Better" (from Stars of CCTV)
6. "Stars of CCTV" (from Stars of CCTV)
7. "Move On Now" (from Stars of CCTV)
8. "You and Me" (from "Suburban Knights" single)
9. "Suburban Knights" (from Once Upon a Time in the West)
10. "Can't Get Along (Without You)" (from Once Upon a Time in the West)
11. "I Shall Overcome" (Fist Full of Dollars mix) (original version from One Upon a Time in the West)
12. "Tonight" (from Once Upon a Time in the West)
13. "Good for Nothing" (from Killer Sounds)
14. "Fire in the House" (from Killer Sounds)
15. "Bring It On" (from Killer Sounds)
16. "Give It Up" (from Killer Sounds)
17. "Like a Drug" (from Killer Sounds iTunes deluxe version)
18. "Move Over" (new song)
19. "Hard to Beat" (Axwell mix radio edit)

Disc two (deluxe edition)

1. "Tied Up Too Tight" (BBC Radio 1 Live Lounge)
2. "Hard to Beat" (Axwell mix full version)
3. "Suburban Knights" (Steve Angello & Sebastian Ingrosso mix)
4. "Sweat" (Greg Kirstin mix)
5. "Help Me Please"
6. "Seven Nation Army"
7. "Middle Eastern Holiday" (Wrongtom Meets the Rockers East of Medina)
8. "Stay Alive"
9. "Killer Sounds"
10. "Hard to Beatmix"
11. "Sick of It All"
12. "Pain in My Heart"
13. "Empty Streets"
14. "Better Do Better" (Wrongtom Wild Inna 81 version)
15. "These Four Walls and I"
16. "Don't Wanna Flight"
17. "Polish Love Song"
