= In Operation =

Hard Fi: In Operation

Video by Hard Fi
- Released: 8 May 2006
- Genre: Indie rock
- Label: Warner Music
- Producer: Wolsey White, Richard Archer

Hard Fi chronology
Stars of CCTV (2005)	Hard Fi: In Operation (2006)	Once Upon a Time in the West (2007)

Alternative cover
- CCTVersions

Professional ratings
Review scores
Source	Rating
AllMusic	link
The Beat Surrender	3/5 stars
Contactmusic	(Favourable) link
MusicOMH	link
Q	(July 2006)

In Operation is the first live DVD from Hard-Fi, filmed at London's historic Astoria venue and the full live performance, during their sold out 15 date UK tour in December 2005. The CD/DVD reached #62 in the UK Album Chart.

== History ==
The performance, in front of an ecstatic hometown crowd, features all the tracks on Hard-Fi's 750,000 selling, #1 debut album Stars Of CCTV, at the time brand new track "You And Me", which would go on to appear as a B-side to "Suburban Knights", and the band's version of "Seven Nation Army" by The White Stripes – a massive crowd favourite. It also comes backed with CCTVersions – an exclusive CD which features dubbed versions of album tracks, produced by a host of guests including Roots Manuva and Wrongtom.

Additional footage includes all the Hard-Fi videos, from April 2005's "Tied Up Too Tight" through to "Better Do Better". There is also behind the scenes footage from the making of each video plus the Stars of CCTV EPK and mini-documentary 'In Operation' – a Channel 4 special on the band. There's also a host of hidden content on the DVD, including 2004's rarely seen, original video for "Cash Machine" which saw the band dodging security to vault the perimeter fence at Heathrow airport to film just feet from the main runway, all the band's videos and exclusive behind the scenes footage.

Q magazine gave it four stars saying, "Slick, suburban escapism, live in your front room, Archer's anthems skilfully balance passion and craft".

== Track listing ==
=== Disc One - DVD ===
Live at the Astoria

1. The Man With a Harmonica / Middle Eastern Holiday
2. Gotta Reason
3. Unnecessary Trouble
4. Better Do Better
5. Tied Up Too Tight
6. Feltham Is Singing Out
7. You and Me
8. Seven Nation Army
9. Cash Machine
10. Hard to Beat
11. Move On Now
12. Stars of CCTV
13. Living for the Weekend

CCTV Videos

1. Stars of CCTV
2. Cash Machine [Original Version]
3. Cash Machine [ATM Version]
4. Cash Machine [On Set]
5. Tied Up Too Tight
6. Hard to Beat
7. Hard to Beat [On Set]
8. Living for the Weekend
9. Living for the Weekend [On Set]
10. Better Do Better
11. Better Do Better [On Set]
12. Photo Gallery
13. In Operation [Channel 4 Featurette]

=== Disc Two - CCTVersions ===
1. Cash Machine [Roots Manuva Dub Remix]
2. Cash Converter [Dub Machine Part 2]
3. Better Dub Better [Wolsey White Dub]
4. Middle Eastern Holiday [Wrongtom Meets The Rockers East of Medina Dub]
5. Living For The Weekend [Wolsey White & Fred Dub]
6. Seven Nation Army
7. Dub of CCTV [Wolsey White Dub]
8. Better Do Better [Wrongtom Wild Inna 81 Version]
9. Dubbed Up Too Tight
10. Move On Dub
