= I Shall Overcome =

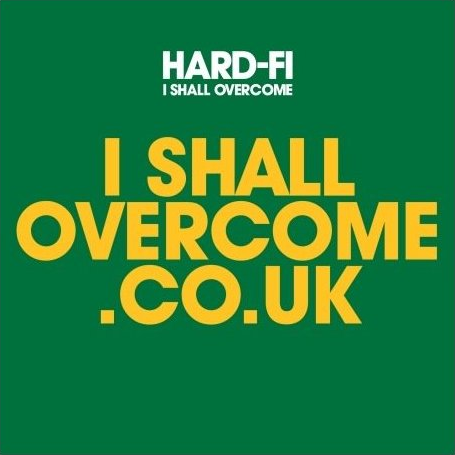

Single by Hard-Fi

from the album Once Upon a Time in the West
- B-side: "Empty Streets, Don't Wanna Fight, Pain in My Heart, I Shall Overcome (acoustic)"
- Released: 29 February 2008
- Recorded: 2007
- Length: 4:16
- Label: Warner Music
- Songwriter(s): Richard Archer

Hard-Fi singles chronology
"Can't Get Along (Without You)" (2007)	"I Shall Overcome" (2008)	"Good for Nothing" (2011)

"I Shall Overcome" is the third single from English indie rock band Hard-Fi's second album Once Upon a Time in the West. It was released on 29 February 2008. Written and co-produced by Richard Archer, it features a gospel choir and acoustic guitars along with a mariachi trumpet on the "Per un Pugno di Hard-Fi version". Tracy Ackerman contributes backing vocals on the song.

The song reached #35 in the UK Singles Charts, despite the fact that 1,000 copies were not counted due to a mistake made by Concert Live. It followed the success of "Suburban Knights" and "Can't Get Along (Without You)" in Peru by reaching #4.

== History ==
The song started off as a rough demo during the recording of Stars of CCTV. The song is apparently based on people watching over and looking out for others, telling people not to give up and "to not let the bastards drag you down".

Going deeper, the song is a tribute to frontman Richard Archer's late father, who was one of the few people to support his musical ambitions before he became successful, he told XFM "When you're from a town like ours and you wanna be in a band, everyone thinks you're just wasting time. There's always people out there who'll tell you 'Give it up, you're not good enough.' There's always haters that wanna criticize you and put you down just because you're there and they're not. It's about having someone standing there and saying 'I believe in you', and I was lucky enough to have that person. They're not around anymore, but this song's for them." Archer added: "It's my old man. I was lucky enough to have someone like him and he deserves these props."

Richard Archer said that the person in the song is his father and that he loves the groove on the track.

He also announced the Per Un Pugno Di Hard-Fi version which has been stated to be different from the version that appears on Once Upon a Time in the West, Archer explains;

"Those of you who came along on our December tour will know that ISO live was slightly different from the album version with a mariachi trumpet – we wanted to get a bit of that Ennio Morricone does Spaghetti Western vibe, hopefully you'll agree this worked and wasn't less Fistful of Dollars and more Three Amigos. Anyway we got Ben (who played trumpet on tour) in and did a studio version with a few extra bits and pieces."

The song was first announced as a single along with the live CD called Once Upon a Time in December.

On 10 March 2008, the band promoted the single by organizing a CD signing in HMV, Staines. The band also performed a select set list including "I Shall Overcome" in acoustic, "Suburban Knights" and "Hard to Beat" plus some covers including "A Town Called Malice" and "Should I Stay or Should I Go".

=== B-sides ===
On 17 January 2008, Archer left a Myspace blog talking about the b-sides for the single.

"Don't Wanna Fight was inspired by two things, The Slickers track 'Johnny Too Bad' and a documentary I saw maybe a year ago about this bloke who was caught up in gangs and petty crime. The doc was following his attempt to leave that life behind for the sake of his girlfriend and young child. No Matter what he did he always seemed to find himself back where he started, you got the impression that he didn't really want to change at all."

"Empty Streets – ever walked home alone from the pub a bit pissed and feeling a bit sorry for yourself??? Contrary to how it sounds – no weed was smoked whilst recording this track..."

"Pain in My Heart – this was written some time ago not long after I lost my old man and I guess is about that. It's been slowly put together over time, so much so that most of the recording was already done, all we did was add some real piano."

Archer also went on to mention an acoustic version of the track;

"We thought about making the acoustic version of ISO something different in its own right, a bit like the acoustic version of Livin for the Weekend – but it felt best just totally stripped down, just me singing and playing it into a mic. I think it adds another dimension to the song."

== Competitions ==
In February 2008, a minisite called I Shall Overcome.co.uk (of which is advertised on the front cover of each physical release) was opened. It stated that the band wanted fans to show off their creative skills by remixing the track or creating a cover sleeve for the single.

The winner of the remix competition would have their remix officially released by the band and serviced to club DJs while they would also receive a framed vinyl with their remix recorded on it. Winner of the cover sleeve competition would receive a framed copy of their design signed by each member of the band.

The remix competition's winner was chosen by the public, it was possible to give each song a rating out of five. The remix by "DJ Newsagent" ended with the highest average rating and won the competition. The winners of the cover sleeve competition were chosen by the band themselves.

=== Music video ===
On the video from Pulse Films directing trio D.A.R.Y.L, was filmed in the All Stars boxing gym on the Harrow Road in west London. The band offered a chance to fans, 18 years old or above, who looked like genuine boxing fans to appear as extras in the video through an online competition. A photo of the person had to be sent in and then the people who looked most appropriate for the video were given a phone call confirming that they had been chosen. The video is said to be inspired by the movies Raging Bull and Snatch.

The video, filmed in black-and-white, depicts two boxers with one being the underdog who throughout the video is shown to either be given support by the crowd (with Archer standing among them as he sings) or shown on the roads of west London, being shown encouragement by his friends. The underdog eventually wins, staying true to the song title, "I Shall Overcome".

Trellick Tower, a block of flats which has become a London landmark, makes a cameo appearance in the video.

== Track listings ==
Notes

- The "Per Un Pugno Di Hard-Fi Version" was originally called the "Over the top Extended Version", the name change often causes fans to think of the two names as two different versions, it is named after the Italian name for the Spaghetti Western film, Fistful of Dollars. It was available from 11 March 2008, exclusively through 7Digital. It was originally scheduled for release on 25 February 2008, but was pushed forward to 10 March 2008. Due to difficulties on the website it was pushed forward again to 17 March 2008 but ended up being available for download on 11 March 2008.
- The Limited Edition CD is also referred to as 'I Shall Overcome CD2' and was also available by purchasing the Once Upon a Time in December multi-format bundle.

It was released in various bundles, a live CD + download bundle and a bumper edition featuring the Live CD and download as well as all 3 formats of the forthcoming single I Shall Overcome.

- Live album + exclusive download of "I Shall Overcome"
- Live album + exclusive download of "I Shall Overcome" + 3 physical

These bundles were exclusive to those who attended one of the concerts during the band's December tour. One of the formats, which is the limited edition CD, was available only through this promotion.

1. Empty Streets
2. Pain in My Heart

=== CD 2 – Limited edition ===
1. I Shall Overcome (Axwell Remix)
2. Don't Wanna Fight
3. I Shall Overcome (Video)

=== 7" ===
1. I Shall Overcome (Radio Edit)
2. I Shall Overcome (Acoustic)

=== Digital download ===
1. I Shall Overcome (Album Version)
2. I Shall Overcome (Per Un Pugno Di Hard-Fi Version)
3. I Shall Overcome (Axwell Remix)
4. I Shall Overcome (Shoes Remix)

== Charts ==
"I Shall Overcome" has been listed for 1 week on the UK Singles Chart. It fared better than its predecessor "Can't Get Along (Without You)" which peaked only at #45. This single charted ten places higher in the UK Singles Chart, peaking in the UK Top 40 at #35 on 16 March 2008, where it dropped out of the Top 75 altogether the following week.

=== Uncounted sales ===
On 20 March 2008, Richard Archer posted a blog stating that due to an administrative mistake, around 1000 copies ordered during the December tour were not counted towards the chart position, he said, "you can imagine we're not pleased."

Chart (2008)	Peak position
UK Singles Chart	35
