= Killer Sounds =

Studio album by Hard-Fi
- Released: 19 August 2011
- Recorded: 2008–2011
- Genre: Indie rock; alternative rock; indie pop; pop rock
- Length: 39:43
- Label: Necessary; Warner
- Producer: Richard Archer; Stuart Price; Alan Moulder; Greg Kurstin

Hard-Fi chronology
Once Upon a Time in December (2007)	Killer Sounds (2011)	Hard-Fi: Best of 2004–2014 (2014)

Singles from Killer Sounds
- 1. "Good for Nothing" Released: 17 June 2011; 2. "Fire in the House" Released: 5 August 2011; 3. "Bring It On" Released: 24 October 2011

Killer Sounds is the third studio album by English indie rock band Hard-Fi. It was released on 19 August 2011 in the United Kingdom and Ireland.

The iTunes bonus track "Like a Drug" was featured on the deluxe edition of the soundtrack of The Twilight Saga: Breaking Dawn – Part 1.

== Album information ==
In 2022, frontman Richard Archer told The Independent that the band were not in a great place when Killer Sounds came out: "[W]e probably got frustrated with each other. There was a point when it got really difficult towards the end. Everyone lost a bit of love for it, but we always stayed friends. Certainly for Steve [Kemp, drummer] and I, we'd been in bands that hadn't worked out and we were super focused on 'we can't fuck this up'. And I think at some point, that became to the detriment of the project and to us, our mental health, because we should have just enjoyed it. Everything had to be 'we've got to get this right'. Instead of just rolling with it we were worried about everything."

== Singles ==
- "Good for Nothing" was released as the first single from the album on 17 June 2011 and debuted at number 51 on the UK singles chart.
- "Fire in the House" was released as the second single on 5 August 2011 and debuted at number 170 on the UK singles chart.
- "Bring It On" was released as the third single on 24 October 2011 subsequently failing to chart in the UK singles chart that week.

== Critical reception ==
Professional ratings
Review scores
Source	Rating
Metro	4/5 stars
The Guardian	4/5 stars
Financial Times	3/5 stars
NME	3/5 stars
The Observer	4/5 stars
The Independent	2/5 stars
The Daily Telegraph	1/5 stars

Upon its release, the album received mostly positive reviews from critics. The Metro gave it four out of five stars, saying: "Hard-Fi’s Killer Sounds features a collection of punchy potential hits on which a real sense of fun (and, dare we say it, camp) abounds."

A negative review came from James Lachno in The Daily Telegraph, who awarded the album one star out of five. He called it "moody" and "humourless" and said that the "sexualised lyrics sound seedy – or worse, menacing".

== Track listing ==
Killer Sounds track listing
No.	Title	Writer(s)	Producer(s)	Length
1.	"Good for Nothing"	Richard Archer; Hale	Archer	3:51
2.	"Fire in the House"	Archer	Archer; Stuart Price	4:13
3.	"Give It Up"	Archer; Ed Young; Lonnie Young	Andy Gray; Archer; Wolsey White	4:34
4.	"Bring It On"	Archer	Gray; Archer; White (Note: Additional production)	4:01
5.	"Feels Good"	Archer	Gray; White	3:54
6.	"Stop"	Archer; Nick Fyffe	Gray; White (Note: Additional production)	3:43
7.	"Stay Alive"	Archer; Greg Kurstin	Kurstin	3:44
8.	"Excitement"	Archer	Gray	3:37
9.	"Love Song"	Archer	Price	3:12
10.	"Sweat"	Archer	Kurstin	3:23
11.	"Killer Sounds"	Archer	Gray	3:36

iTunes deluxe edition
No.	Title	Length
12.	"Like a Drug"	3:40
13.	"Happy"	3:10
14.	"Second Line Style"	3:43
15.	"Sweat" (Greg Kurstin mix)	3:21

== Charts ==
Chart performance for Killer Sounds
Chart (2011)	Peak position
Irish Albums (IRMA)	77
Swiss Albums (Schweizer Hitparade)	77
Scottish Albums (OCC)	13
UK Albums (OCC)	9

== Release history ==
Release history and formats for Killer Sounds
Region	Date	Format	Label
Ireland	19 August 2011	Digital download	Necessary
United Kingdom	19 August 2011	Digital download	Necessary
Canada	15 March 2013	Digital download	Necessary
United States	15 March 2013	Digital download	Necessary
