= Bring It On (Hard-Fi song) =

2011 Hard-Fi song

Single by Hard-Fi

from the album Killer Sounds
- Released: 24 October 2011
- Recorded: Staines, England
- Genre: Alternative rock, indie rock
- Length: 4:01
- Label: Necessary Records / Warner
- Songwriter(s): Richard Archer
- Producer(s): Stuart Price, Richard Archer

Hard-Fi singles chronology
"Fire in the House" (2011)	"Bring It On" (2011)

"Bring It On" is the third single from English indie rock band Hard-Fi's third studio album Killer Sounds. It was released on 24 October 2011, but failed to chart. However, the single is featured in adverts for the popular Football Manager 2012 game. The single cover does not bear the "Parental Advisory" sticker, despite the profanity used during the second verse.

== Music video ==
The music video for "Bring It On" was filmed during September 2011 at Electric Brixton in London during Hard-Fi's Killer Sounds Tour.

== Reception ==
"Bring It On" received mixed reviews from critics. It was given a positive review by This Feeling magazine, who said: "The third single to be released from Killer Sounds sees Brit-nominated quartet Hard-Fi returning to the kind of form that won the band so many fans back in 2005. It's not quite "Hard to Beat", but it's definitely in the same league and destined to be a real dance floor filler."

Electric Banana awarded the song 3/5 stars, saying: "'Killer Sounds' is Hard-Fi’s first album in four years and the question on fan’s lips at the moment is 'was it really worth waiting for?’ The response has been mixed, but overall the result was decidedly average, a trend new single 'Bring it On' is happy to go along with. Catchy and with a strong opening showcasing the band's trademark highly rhythmic, persistent guitar riffs and sharp drums, the song becomes wholly unremarkable by the time it reaches the chorus. Instead of catching the listener's attention it washes over you like you've heard it a hundred times before. And that's the problem; it feels too familiar to stick and sounds like it could be any old indie-rock song. Good to listen to, but nothing special."

However, it received a mediocre 2/5 rating from Unreality Shout, saying: "Hard-Fi are capable of much better, but "Bring It On" is a moody, humourless affair."
