= Cash Machine (disambiguation) =

"Cash Machine" is a song by Hard-Fi.

Cash Machine may also refer to:

- Cash Machine Records, an imprint of German record label SPV
- "Cash Machine", a 2016 song by DRAM from Big Baby DRAM
- "Cash Machine", a 2019 song by Oliver Tree from Ugly Is Beautiful
- Cash machine, or automated teller machine (ATM)
