= Help!: A Day in the Life =

Compilation album by various artists

Help: A Day in the Life

Compilation album by various artists
- Released: 9 September 2005
- Recorded: 8–9 September 2005
- Length: 87:12
- Label: Independiente
- Producer: War Child

War Child charity albums chronology
Hope (2003)	Help: A Day in the Life (2005)	War Child Presents Heroes (2009)

Professional ratings
Review scores
Source	Rating
AllMusic	3.5/5 stars
Pitchfork Media	(5.5/10)

Help: A Day in the Life is a 2005 compilation album of music by contemporary artists from the United Kingdom and Canada. It was produced by the UK charity War Child to celebrate the 10th anniversary of their previous release, The Help Album, and to raise money to fund the charity's efforts in war-torn countries such as Bosnia and Herzegovina. The name is a conglomeration of the titles of two Beatles songs, "Help!" (featured on the Help! album and film) and "A Day in the Life" (from the album Sgt. Pepper's Lonely Hearts Club Band). On Wednesday 14 September 2005, five days after its release, it broke the record for the fastest-selling download album ever.

Whereas The Help Album had broken records in 1995 by being released only five days after it was recorded, Help!: A Day in the Life was recorded and made available for purchase via the War Child Music website within approximately thirty hours. Recording began at 12pm BST on Thursday 8 September and was made available for purchase at around 6pm on Friday 9 September.

Contributors include Radiohead and Manic Street Preachers, both of whom had contributed tracks to the original 1995 album; a cover of Elton John's "Goodbye Yellow Brick Road" by War Child patrons Keane; a song from Gorillaz called "Hong Kong" which was played live various times by the band; a last-minute contribution from Coldplay; and a song by Emmanuel Jal, who was involved in the Sudan conflict as a child. The Radiohead song, "I Want None of This", was the most downloaded track.

War Child Canada released a Canadian version of Help!: A Day in the Life in 2006. Contributions for the Canadian version included songs by Sam Roberts, the Dears, and Buck 65. A cover of Bob Dylan's "Don't Think Twice It's Alright" by Emily Haines and James Shaw of Toronto's Metric was also included on the album.

The first single from the album was "Lebo's River", a song by Raine Maida, who helped produce the album, and Chantal Kreviazuk, his wife. The chorus was written by Lebo Kgasapane, an 18-year-old South African singer-songwriter who died of AIDS. The track features vocals by Lebo, as well as by Archie Khambula, a good friend of Lebo's.

The album cover was designed by John Squire.

== Reworks ==
Tracks first released on this album were subsequently re-recorded for the albums D-Sides by Gorillaz, Once Upon a Time in the West by Hard-Fi, Razorlight by Razorlight and Aman Iman by Tinariwen.

== Track listings ==
All tracks are written by their respective artists, except where noted.

UK track listing
No.	Title	Writer(s)	Performed by	Length
1.	"How You See The World No. 2"		Coldplay	4:05
2.	"Kirby's House"		Razorlight	4:13
3.	"I Want None Of This"		Radiohead	3:15
4.	"Goodbye Yellow Brick Road"	Elton John, Bernie Taupin	Keane & Faultline	3:41
5.	"Gua"		Emmanuel Jal	3:55
6.	"Hong Kong"		Gorillaz	7:12
7.	"Leviathan"		The Manic Street Preachers	2:33
8.	"I Heard It Through The Grapevine"	Norman Whitfield, Barrett Strong	The Kaiser Chiefs	4:52
9.	"Cross-eyed Bear"		Damien Rice	3:42
10.	"Gone Are The Days"		The Magic Numbers	3:09
11.	"Cler Achel"		Tinariwen	4:23
12.	"It Was Nothing"		The Coral	2:53
13.	"Mars Needs Women"		Mylo	3:28
14.	"Wasteland"		Maximo Park	2:58
15.	"Snowball"		Elbow	4:49
16.	"The Present"		Bloc Party	4:36
17.	"Help Me Please"		Hard-Fi	3:11
18.	"Phantom Broadcast"		The Go! Team	2:32
19.	"From Bollywood To Battersea"		Babyshambles	3:09
20.	"Happy Christmas, War Is Over (Note: This track was not featured on the 2021 digital reissue and on the 2022 vinyl release of the album.)"	John Lennon, Yoko Ono	George and Antony	4:06

Canadian track listing
No.	Title	Writer(s)	Performed by	Length
1.	"How You See The World No. 2"		Coldplay	4:04
2.	"Missing"		City And Colour	4:42
3.	"Hong Kong"		Gorillaz	7:13
4.	"I Want None Of This"		Radiohead	3:15
5.	"Magic On My Mind"		Sam Roberts	3:35
6.	"Stand Alone"		Bedouin Soundclash	3:55
7.	"Utilities"		The Weakerthans	4:21
8.	"Ballad Of Humankindness"		The Dears	4:12
9.	"Cross-Eyed Bear"		Damien Rice	3:42
10.	"Goodbye Yellow Brick Road"	John, Taupin	Keane with Faultline	3:42
11.	"At The Angels Feet"		Payolas	4:21
12.	"I Heard It Through The Grapevine"	Whitfield, Strong	Kaiser Chiefs	4:52
13.	"Spooked"		Buck 65	3:31
14.	"Get It Right"		Jets Overhead	3:47
15.	"Surrender"		Surefire	3:06
16.	"The Present"		Bloc Party	4:37
17.	"Don't Think Twice, It's Alright"	Bob Dylan	Emily Haines and James Shaw of Metric	3:02
18.	"Lebo's River - A Tribute (Note: This track is labelled as a bonus track.)" (Ft. Lebo Kgasapane & Archie Khambula)		Raine Maida and Chantal Kreviazuk	3:15

Digital download track listing
No.	Title	Writer(s)	Performed by	Length
1.	"I Want None Of This"		Radiohead	3:15
2.	"It Was Nothing"		The Coral	2:55
3.	"Hello Conscience"		The Zutons	3:54
4.	"Snowball"		Elbow	5:00
5.	"Gone Are The Days"		The Magic Numbers	3:09
6.	"Wasteland"		Maximo Park	2:58
7.	"Phantom Broadcast"		The Go! Team	2:33
8.	"Gua"		Emmanuel Jal	4:01
9.	"Goodbye Yellow Brick Road"	John, Taupin	Keane and Faultline	3:59
10.	"I Heard It Through The Grapevine"	Whitfield, Strong	The Kaiser Chiefs	4:59
11.	"The Present"		Bloc Party	4:37
12.	"Help Me Please"		Hard-Fi	3:21
13.	"The Eighth Station Of The Cross Kebab House"		Belle and Sebastian	3:57
14.	"Cler Achel"		Tinariwen	5:16
15.	"Happy Christmas, War Is Over"	Lennon, Ono	George and Antony	4:06
16.	"Hong Kong"		Gorillaz	7:14
17.	"From Bollywood To Battersea"		Babyshambles	3:11
18.	"Leviathan"		The Manic Street Preachers	2:37
19.	"Kirby's House"		Razorlight	4:13
20.	"Cross-eyed Bear"		Damien Rice	3:45
21.	"Mars Needs Women"		Mylo	3:51
22.	"How You See The World No. 2"		Coldplay	4:04
