= Tied Up Too Tight =

2005 single by Hard-Fi

Single by Hard-Fi

from the album Stars of CCTV
- Released: 18 April 2005
- Studio: Staines-upon-Thames, England
- Length: 3:33
- Label: Necessary, Atlantic
- Songwriter: Richard Archer
- Producers: Wolsey White, Richard Archer

Hard-Fi singles chronology
"Cash Machine" (2005)	"Tied Up Too Tight" (2005)	"Hard to Beat" (2005)

"Tied Up Too Tight" is the second single from English band Hard-Fi's debut album, Stars of CCTV (2005). It was released on 18 April 2005. The song reached number 15 in the UK charts and was set to follow the success of Hard-Fi's debut single "Cash Machine"—a track that received "single of the week" accolades from the likes of NME, Time Out and Radio 1's Zane Lowe, who tagged "Tied Up Too Tight" as "the hottest record in the world" while receiving great support from XFM and Jo Whiley.

== History ==
The single was originally called "Middle Eastern Holiday", but it was seen that "Tied up Too Tight" was particularly successful when performed live and was thus chosen as the single instead. However, they decided to keep "Middle Eastern Holiday" as a B-side which caused a debate on whether the single was a double A-side or not.

"Tied Up Too Tight" and "Middle Eastern Holiday" are two tracks that showcase the variety of sources that have influenced Hard-Fi. The politically motivated song that is "Middle Eastern Holiday" is taken from Hard-Fi's self-financed album Stars of CCTV while their cover of The White Stripes' "Seven Nation Army" sees Hard-Fi transforming the blues stomper into a thuggish, attitude-drenched skank.

=== "Tied Up Too Tight" ===
"Tied Up Too Tight" is all about the desire to escape the mundanity of the boredom spent in the band's hometown of Staines, and leaving for the more lively surroundings of London. "Straight out of West London... Just like a loaded gun"

Richard Archer describes the song by saying, "It talks about being stuck in a town and wanting to leave to find people like yourself. It's also about the buzz you get from the city. The music's better, the girl's are prettier etc." "Where I come from is pretty grey, boring and depressing if you're not into the usual run-of-the-mill sorts of things. It could be about any satellite town and how you don't really feel as if you fit in there. So it's about getting out and driving to London, seeing the bright lights and the people dressing cooler and being cooler. It's basically a going-out song."

The video was directed by Richard Skinner and shows black and white clips of the band and of cars heading towards London.

=== "Middle Eastern Holiday" ===
This song is based on modern day culture of teenagers / young adults going to war, risking their life and not knowing whether they will see their families or friends again. It also has a political view, "back at home politicians sit, over lunch, discussing this". The band are known to be anti-war and anti-racism as they have appeared at Love Music Hate Racism gigs, and at Damon Albarn's African Express.

The song is often the first song to be played on live shows after the introduction that is usually "The Man with the Harmonica" by Ennio Morricone. On live shows the track features a more prominent use of the melodica and usually comes with visuals depicting war.

== Track listings ==
CD single

1. "Tied Up Too Tight"
2. "Middle Eastern Holiday"

7-inch vinyl

1. "Tied Up Too Tight"
2. "Middle Eastern Holiday"
3. "Seven Nation Army" (White Stripes cover)

10-inch vinyl

1. "Tied Up Too Tight"
2. "Middle Eastern Holiday"
3. "Seven Nation Army" (White Stripes cover)
4. "Middle Eastern Holiday" (Wrongtom Meets the Rockers East Medina)
5. "Middle Eastern Holiday" (Chicken Lips Remix)

== Charts ==
Chart (2005)	Peak position
Scotland Singles (Official Charts)	16
UK Singles (Official Charts)	15
