= Good for Nothing (song) =

Single by Hard-Fi

from the album Killer Sounds
- Released: 17 June 2011
- Recorded: Staines, England
- Genre: Alternative rock, indie rock
- Length: 3:51
- Label: Necessary Records / Warner
- Songwriter(s): Richard Archer
- Producer(s): Richard Archer

Hard-Fi singles chronology
| "I Shall Overcome" (2008) | "Good for Nothing" (2011) | "Fire in the House" (2011) |

"Good for Nothing" is a single by English indie rock band Hard-Fi. It is the first single from their third studio album Killer Sounds. The single cover does not bear the "Parental Advisory" sticker, despite the profanity used during the chorus. It was released as a digital download on 17 June 2011, and soon after received a "Song of the Week" designation from The Tune.

== Music video ==
The official music video was filmed in Barcelona, Spain. It features Hard-Fi walking around the Tibidabo area, while there are shots of the Temple Expiatori del Sagrat Cor. There are also appearances of Sant Martí, El Raval and an official RCD Espanyol shirt, the non-touristic and commercial part from Barcelona.

== Track listing ==
=== 7" single ===
1. Good for Nothing
2. Good for Nothing (Hard-Fi Meets Wrongtom)

=== CD & iTunes single ===
1. Good for Nothing
2. Good for Nothing (Wilkinson Remix)
3. Good for Nothing (Mark Knight & D. Ramirez Remix)
4. Good for Nothing (Ray Foxx Remix)
5. Good for Nothing (Hard-Fi Meets Wrongtom 'Good for Dubbing')

== Chart performance ==
The song peaked at #51 on the UK Singles Chart.
