= Cash Machine =

2005 single by Hard-Fi

Single by Hard-Fi

from the album Stars of CCTV
- Released: 24 January 2005
- Studio: Staines-upon-Thames, England
- Length: 3:43
- Label: Atlantic, Necessary
- Songwriter: Richard Archer
- Producers: Wolsey White, Richard Archer

Hard-Fi singles chronology
"Cash Machine" (2005)	"Tied Up too Tight" (2005)

Re-release singles chronology
"Living for the Weekend" (2005)	"Cash Machine" (2005)	"Better Do Better" (2006)

Alternative cover
- CD promo cover

"Cash Machine" is the debut single by English indie rock band Hard-Fi, taken from their 2005 debut album, Stars of CCTV. It was originally released on 24 January 2005, when it was ineligible in the UK Singles Chart due to the inclusion of a sticker. After the success of singles such as "Hard to Beat", it was re-released on 26 December 2005, peaking at number 14 on the UK Singles Chart and number 15 on the US Billboard Modern Rock Tracks chart. There have been three different music videos: one low-budget for the original release and two versions for the re-release.

== History ==
Hard-Fi frontman Richard Archer describes the song as being about "having no money". It tells of the kind of life Archer may have lived before reaching success: "Go to a cash machine, to get a ticket home, a message on the screen says don't make plans you're broke" and "I try to skip the fare, ticket inspector's there."

The song contains a reference/adaptation of an old folk song. The lyrics towards the very end of the song are: "There's a hole in my pocket! My pocket! My pocket!" This is an adaptation of the folk song, "There's a Hole in the Bucket."

The original release of "Cash Machine" was not intended by the band to be chart eligible, instead it was released to get the band radio play and hype for the following release, "Tied Up Too Tight". As a result, it was released with a free sticker, a stunt pulled to force the single into being released. The single sold approximately 3,000 copies, which was about how many copies of the single were actually released and would have reached number 40 had it been eligible.

The band had pre-planned to release the song later which turned out to be on 26 December 2005, where it reached number 14 in the UK Singles Charts, number 15 in the US Modern Rock chart and top 40 in the Netherlands, Italy and Ireland.

The song is featured as part of the FIFA Manager 06 soundtrack.

== Music videos ==
There are three different music videos for the song.

=== Original version ===
Directed by Kimberly Frescas

This is the original video which has Hard-Fi's boss "Mr. Big" telling the band that "the reason you boys are so skint is the record company hasn't paid us." He orders them to steal the tapes from a courier at Heathrow Airport. The band, wearing masks of political figures such as Queen Elizabeth II and Tony Blair, end up mostly fighting each other, while lead singer Archer discovers the case believed to hold the tapes. He is then held at gunpoint by the courier, but saved by the other three band members, guitarist Ross Phillips, drummer Steve Kemp and bassist Kai Stephens, who jump on the courier and take the case. The band cover him with Silly String and take the case to a hideout to discover that it contains only the courier's lunch. Archer then exclaims "Oh knickers!" and the others shake their heads in disappointment.

The video is interspersed with shots of the band playing in a field near an airport as large planes fly overhead. It contains a sly reference to their idols the Clash: during the performance in the field, Archer pulls a mask off of Stephens' face – in the video for "Rock the Casbah", when Joe Strummer reveals guitarist Mick Jones' face.

Archer explains that "The budget was less than £1,000. The whole budget was pizza, beer and world leader masks. The rest was favours from friends, but for the second one we had much more money. When we made that single we weren't signed to a major label yet but a small independent (who we're still signed to but have licensed to the major). So we had no money, we'd made this little mini-album for just £300 in a lock-up in Staines on a moldy old laptop that kept crashing. And we thought we needed a single and a video for it. But we had no money. A mate of mine was pretty good with a camera, and we decided to make a Heist movie, because we'd seen a documentary about a heist and the U2 "Beautiful Day" video – obviously that was done with CGI graphics and hundreds of thousands of pounds, but we thought 'Let's use our brains, our resources, what's round us. We live right underneath Heathrow Airport, let's go and do it for real.' So, we scouted the area, worked out which way the planes were flying, and got up early one morning, got the gear over the fence, set up and assessed the risks: Best case scenario, we could get away with it – unlikely; or we could get moved on, that wouldn't be so bad; arrested – tricky; or shot – dead. That's pretty bad. But we were there for about half an hour. The security must have seen us with all this gear, playing a gig at the end of the runway and thought we must've had permission. The hardest bit was we had a portable stereo playing the track to mime along to, which sounded loud in the room but outdoors with a 747 going over your head and the ground shaking you can't hear anything. So, if you look carefully we're all out of sync. And then we'd gone by then. I love it when a plan comes together."

"We were trying to make an impressive looking video with no money. And of course, the airport's on our doorstep so we thought we'd use it. The guy who was directing it went into the visitors centre and said 'I'm moving into the area. Can you tell me where the planes will be coming in tomorrow cos I want to know how they relate to the house I'm buying.' So we found out which way they were coming in, got the gear over the fence and set it up thinking that any minute now, we'll be out of here and it will be all over. But I think the people who saw us – a band set up and playing music – though they must have permission otherwise it's too ridiculous, so they left us to get on with it. So we got what we needed then quickly got out of there."

=== ATM version ===
Directed by Dougal Wilson

This is the second video made, but is the one most often used on television. This due to that many channels would not play either of the other two as they feature too much illegal activity. This video is a more literal interpretation of the lyrics of the song (for example, Archer using a mobile phone while singing "I try to phone a friend – my credit's in the red"). It also shows the interior of a cash machine staffed by miniature humans, including the four band members, who work in conditions akin to coal mines. The images are similar to the Fire planet from season 3 of the science fantasy television series Lexx. The video shows these people involved in all steps of making the money, from cutting down the trees used for the paper, to painting the money, to pushing it through the slot when someone requires it. The workers finally rebel, and destroy the interior of the machine in a series of explosions. Life-sized Archer comes to the machine shortly after these events and, finding a message declaring the machine out of service, again proclaims, "Oh knickers!"

Dougal Wilson, the director of the video, is also known for directing "Fit But You Know It" by The Streets, "Dream" by Dizzee Rascal, "Life in Technicolour II" by Coldplay and "Tribulations" by LCD Soundsystem.

=== Alternative version ===
Directed by Ben Crook

The third video is an X-rated version of the video which the band put up as a download for mobile phones and is still available on iTunes. The video follows a ten-pound note through several owners. It begins with Archer getting the note from a cash machine and giving it to a friend. The friend uses it to buy a beer. The bartender keeps the note in his back pocket and puts it toward buying drugs. The drug dealer collects money from a man on the street and gives the note as change. The man's wallet is pinched by a woman and given to another man, who takes the note from and takes it into a stripclub. A stripper's breasts are pixelated after she takes off her bra and the man holds the note out in front of her, begging her to go fully naked. The stripper takes the note, but it is taken from her by the club owner. He accidentally drops it in the alley behind the club, where it is again found by Archer. After examining it for a few seconds, he walks off with it and the video ends. Archer is the only Hard-Fi member to appear in this video.

Archer said, "When you first buy a mobile phone what's the first thing you do? Most of the traffic on mobile phones is obviously pornography, and we're just filling the niche between pornography and music, put them together and there you find the alternative Cash Machine video."

== Track listings ==
=== Original release ===
1. "Cash Machine"
2. "Sick of It All"
3. "Cash Machine" [Old Video]

=== Re-issue ===
- CDS HARD05CD
1. "Cash Machine"
2. "Cash Machine" [Acoustic]
- CDM HARD05CDX
1. "Cash Machine"
2. "Cash Machine" [Roots Manuva Dub]
3. "Cash Machine" [New Video]
4. "Cash Machine" [Old Video]
5. "Cash Machine" [Making of New Video]

=== Cash Machine – EP ===
1. "Cash Machine"
2. "Tied Up Too Tight"
3. "Sick of It All"
4. "Seven Nation Army" (The White Stripes cover)

== Charts ==
=== Weekly charts ===
Chart (2006)	Peak position
Czech Republic Airplay (ČNS IFPI)	85
Germany (GfK)	75
Ireland (IRMA)	39
Italy (FIMI)	25
Netherlands (Single Top 100)	87
Scotland Singles (Official Charts)	16
Sweden (Sverigetopplistan)	60
Switzerland Airplay (Swiss Hitparade)	67
UK Singles (Official Charts)	14
US Modern Rock Tracks (Billboard)	15

=== Year-end charts ===
Chart (2006)	Position
UK Singles (OCC)	165
