= Once Upon a Time in the West (album) =

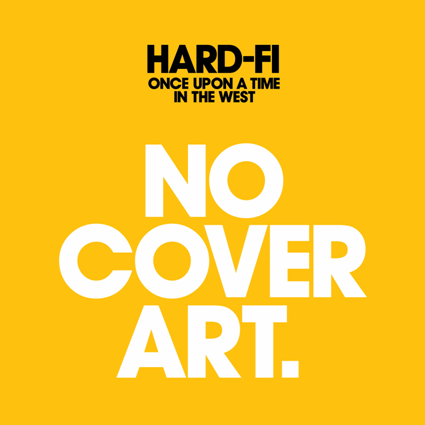

Studio album by Hard-Fi
- Released: 27 August 2007
- Recorded: 2006–2007
- Studio: The Cherry Lips Hits Facility (Staines-upon-Thames, England)
- Genre: Indie rock
- Length: 37:54
- Label: Warner
- Producers: Wolsey White; Richard Archer

Hard-Fi chronology
In Operation (2006)	Once Upon a Time in the West (2007)	Once Upon a Time in December (2007)

Singles from Stars of CCTV
- 1. "Suburban Knights" Released: 6 August 2007; 2. "Can't Get Along (Without You)" Released: 4 November 2007; 3. "I Shall Overcome" Released: 29 February 2008

Alternative cover
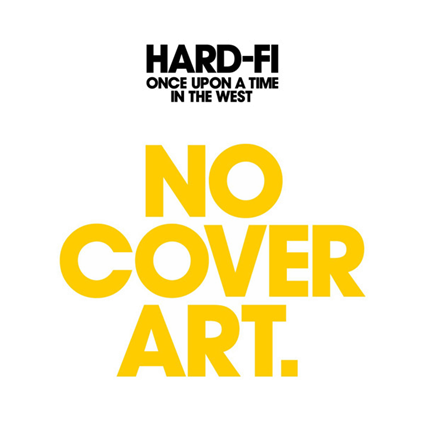
- Japanese edition cover

Once Upon a Time in the West is the second studio album by English indie rock band Hard-Fi. It was released on 3 September 2007 on Necessary/Atlantic and Warner Music UK. It reached #1 in the UK Album Chart in the first week of its release, and #5 in the European Top Albums.

== Overview ==
The first single from the album, "Suburban Knights", was released on 20 August 2007, reaching #7 in UK charts and a download-only release on 13 August 2007. This was followed by "Can't Get Along (Without You)" on 12 November 2007 charting at #45. It reached #1 in Peru, one week after being released and staying there for two weeks. On 10 March 2008, 'I Shall Overcome' became the third single to be released from Once Upon a Time in the West. It reached #4 in South America and hit #35 in the UK singles chart.

The album's cover artwork received some mixed publicity for being different. Drummer Steve Kemp and guitarist Ross Phillips told the Dutch music website FaceCulture that the record label had recommended just having a photograph of Hard-Fi on the cover. Lead singer Richard Archer stated the band wanted "to break the rules," and it was labelled as "The white album of the digital culture" by Peter Saville.

== History ==
The band's debut album, Stars of CCTV sold over 1 million copies worldwide. Due to this success they were offered Abbey Road Studios, but they decided they would again record in their "Cherry Lips" studio, which earned its name from the colour used to paint the walls. The band expanded the studios to have more space.

The band already had ten songs that were thought suitable for the album, but Richard Archer decided that he wanted to spend at least a year concentrating on those ten, re-working the songs and just trying to improve them. In order to improve the songs, the band would play new songs live to see some reception towards what they had been working on and then seeing what they could add or take off.

Through a video podcast, which was broadcast through YouTube, MySpace and iTunes, the band uploaded episodes of how things were going, offering a taste of what was to come and what recording was like among other things such as Ross giving a step to step guide on how to make tea.

"The label were breathing down our necks as soon as we started this album. When we were recording, the label wanted it yesterday. They didn't want to take any chances. We built our own studio for the sessions so everything took a little longer than expected. We were in there working, experimenting with our new setup and the label weren't hearing anything. They started freaking out and talking about pulling the plug and putting us in a new studio with a new producer. I had to tell them to get a f**king grip."

The first single from the album was "Suburban Knights", released on 20 August, which had its first play on 18 June 2007 at 19:20 (BST) on Radio 1. Once Upon a Time in the West was finally released on 3 September 2007. The band launched the album on the midnight of release at Virgin Megastore in Oxford Street, London with a performance of a selected number of songs followed by a CD signing. The following day the band performed at Maida Vale Studios to a small audience who earned their tickets through Radio 1. On 9 September, Once Upon a Time in the West went straight in at #1 in the Album Charts, giving the band their second consecutive #1 album.

The name of the album was chosen as the band had been watching a lot of westerns on their tour bus, being big fans of Ennio Morricone they decided it was perfect as they go on stage to "Man with the Harmonica". Other titles, now deemed by Archer as "silly" were "Bat Out of Staines" and "Songs in the Key of Staines".

Tracks on the album include the 70s ska-inspired "We Need Love", and "Tonight". "The latter is a big piano-driven number – it had a few incarnations before it became what it is, but it's about the possibility of night time. History is made at night." said Archer. Meanwhile, the former harks back to The Specials and was inspired by Billy Bragg's novella "The Progressive Patriot". Other tracks include the R&B-influenced "Can't Get Along (Without You)", "Help Me Please" – a track written about the death of Archer's mother – plus, "I Shall Overcome" which echoes an early The Clash, along with the lead single "Suburban Knights".

"Tonight" went to #6 in Q's Top 50 Essential Downloads, where they described the song as "Richard Archer's written his first power ballad, all piano, surging chorus and lyrics about "feeling alive". If Chris Martin dropped his aitches, this is what he'd sound like."

== Reception ==
Professional ratings
Review scores
Source	Rating
AllMusic	2.5/5 stars
Daily Record	5/5 stars
Drowned in Sound	5/10
The Guardian	3/5 stars
Hot Press	8/10 stars
NME	6/10 stars
Observer Music Monthly	5/5 stars
Pitchfork	4.2/10
PopMatters	6/10
Uncut	4/5 stars

Initial critical response to Once Upon a Time in the West has been generally favorable. At Metacritic, which assigns a normalized rating out of 100 to reviews from mainstream critics, the album has received an average score of 70, based on 16 reviews, consisting of seven reviews with scores of 80 or above, and nine reviews scored at 60 or below. Its overall rating was lower than their debut Stars of CCTV which is rated at 74. An example among the positive reviews was Q's, which gave the album four stars and quoted "goodbye Staines, hello big league".

== Track listing ==
All songs written by Richard Archer.

1. "Suburban Knights" – 4:29
2. "I Shall Overcome" – 4:16
3. "Tonight" – 3:55
4. "Watch Me Fall Apart" – 2:51
5. "I Close My Eyes" – 2:26
6. "Television" – 3:40
7. "Help Me Please" – 3:12
8. "Can't Get Along (Without You)" – 2:58
9. "We Need Love" – 4:02
10. "Little Angel" – 2:52
11. "The King" – 3:14

=== Bonus tracks ===
- "You and Me" – 3:50 (iTunes album exclusive)
- "Tonight" (Acoustic) – 3:50 (iTunes Store / 7digital album exclusive)
- "Suburban Knights" (Acoustic) – 3:34 (iTunes / 7digital album exclusive)
- "These Four Walls and I" – 4:12 (iTunes album exclusive)
- "Suburban Knights" (Steve Angello and Sebastian Ingrosso Mix) – 8:47 (iTunes / 7digital album exclusive)
- "Suburban Knights" (Live at Air Studios) (video) – 3:59 (iTunes album exclusive)

==== Bonus ====
The audio CD also functioned as a CD-ROM, containing Hard-Fi microsite with two videos and some extras.

- "Suburban Knights Live @ Air Studios" (video stream)
- "Can't Get Along (Without You) Live @ Air Studios" (video stream)
- "I Shall Overcome" Live @ Air Studios (video stream)
- "Tonight" Live @ Air Studios (video stream)
- "Cash Machine (Alternative X-Rated Video)" (video stream)

Also available are mobile wallpapers.

=== Credits ===
Mixed by Paul PDub Walton, Wolsey White, Spike Stent (Oasis, U2, Björk and Madonna).

== Charts ==
Chart (2007)	Peak position
Australian Albums (ARIA Charts)	63
UK Albums Top 75	1
Ireland Albums Top 75	3
World Albums Top 40	21
Peru Albums Top 40	2
Germany Albums Top 50	39
Swiss Albums Top 100	49
Croatia Albums Top 100	55
Austria Albums Top 75	51
Dutch Albums Top 100	73
France Albums Top 150	99

== Alternative covers ==
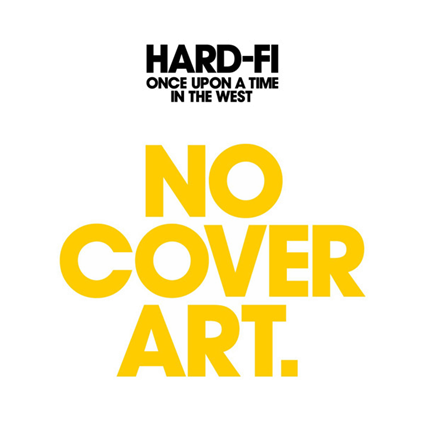
Japan, CD

UK (CD Promo), "HMV" Slipcase

== Singles ==
Cover	Information
	"Suburban Knights": Released: 6 August 2007; Chart positions: #7 UK Singles Chart; #2 UK Download Chart; #15 Ireland; #79 Germany; #5 Peru; #9 Chile
	"Can't Get Along (Without You)": Released: 4 November 2007; Chart positions: #45 UK Singles Chart; #61 UK Download Chart; #1 Peru; #4 Ukraine
	"I Shall Overcome": Released: 29 February 2008; Chart positions: #4 Peru; #35 UK Singles Chart; #1 Croatia; #2 Singapore
