= Living for the Weekend (Hard-Fi song) =

2005 single by Hard-Fi

Single by Hard-Fi

from the album Stars of CCTV
- Released: 5 September 2005
- Recorded: Staines, 2004
- Genre: Indie rock
- Length: 3:42
- Label: Atlantic, Necessary
- Songwriter: Richard Archer
- Producers: Wolsey White, Richard Archer

Hard-Fi singles chronology
"Hard to Beat" (2005)	"Living for the Weekend" (2005)	"Better Do Better" (2005)

Alternative cover
- UK (CD promo)

"Living for the Weekend" is the fourth single from English indie rock band Hard-Fi, from their debut album, Stars of CCTV. It was released on 5 September 2005 and peaked at number 15 on the UK Singles Chart. "Living for the Weekend" was written by Hard-Fi frontman Richard Archer and has been heavily featured in a Life Style Sports commercial in Ireland and a Carling commercial in the United Kingdom.

The Sugababes have covered the song, which appeared on their single "Follow Me Home" as well as the Radio 1's Live Lounge compilation.

== Background ==
"Living for the Weekend" began as a demo with Archer's previous band Contempo before they had split up. At this time, Hard-Fi drummer Steve Kemp was drumming for the Contempo. As with many of the band's songs, the lyrics describe having a dead end job and seeking escapism on the weekend.

Talking about the song, Archer said, "It's a song about when you've been working all week, for me and my friends that would probably be in a job you don't like or enjoy doing, and it gets to Friday and all of that frustration you've been through all week is released. The money you've earned you spend it to get rid of all that stress, you let your hair down, your life's your own again, you're free. Everyone knows what that's like. You get out there and you see your friends again. It's like you've been released. And are you working to live or living to work?"

The single cover does not bear the "Parental Advisory" sticker in spite of the lyrics "Ah shit!" in the second verse. Some radio edits replace this with "Hey, hey" from the first verse.

== Music video ==
The video was filmed in Brentford on 1 August 2005 and was directed by Scott Lyon. It features Hard-Fi performing on top of a building during the day as well as scenes of people walking around the streets and suburbs of Brentford. Towards the end of the song, night falls and a large group of youths can be seen approaching a train station and then at a party. The 1000 Great West End Building can be seen in the video.

== Use in the media ==
The song was used as the theme for the Weekender Show on XFM (now known as Radio X). It was also used on a highlight video for the 2009 Chinese Grand Prix on the official Formula 1 website and in a behind-the-scenes programme for EastEnders in 2010. It has also been featured on the Winter Olympics Special of BBC's Top Gear and in the CSI episode "Time of Your Death".

In Australia, it was used infrequently during the Seven Network's coverage of the Australian Open tennis tournament. It was also used on the sports news show Sports Tonight on Network Ten.

== Track listings ==
=== CD1 ===
HARD04CD

1. "Living for the Weekend" (Radio Edit)
2. "Unnecessary Trouble" (Live)

=== Maxi CD ===
HARD04CDX

1. "Living for the Weekend" (Radio Edit)
2. "Peaches" (Radio 1 Live Version)
3. "Hard to Beat" (Axwell Mix)
4. "Living for the Weekend" (Video)

=== 7" ===
1. "Living for the Weekend"
2. "Living for the Weekend" (Dub)

== Charts ==
"Living for the Weekend" spent 12 weeks on the UK Singles Chart. It entered the UK Singles Chart at #15 and the UK download chart at #27 on 27 September 2005.

Chart (2005)	Peak position
UK Singles Chart	15
UK Download Chart	27

== Certifications ==
Region	Certification	Certified units/sales
United Kingdom (BPI)	Gold	400,000^{‡}
^{‡} Sales+streaming figures based on certification alone.
