= Can't Get Along (Without You) =

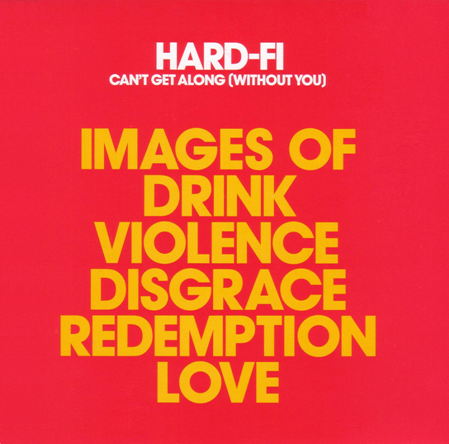

Single by Hard-Fi

from the album Once Upon a Time in the West
- Released: 4 November 2007
- Genre: Indie rock, ska punk
- Length: 2:58
- Label: Warner Music
- Songwriter(s): Richard Archer
- Producer(s): Wolsey White, Richard Archer, Paul 'P-Dub' Walton

Hard-Fi singles chronology
"Suburban Knights" (2007)	"Can't Get Along (Without You)" (2007)	"I Shall Overcome" (2008)

"Can't Get Along (Without You)" is a single from indie band Hard-Fi, taken from their second album Once Upon a Time in the West. It was released on 4 November 2007. Richard Archer has said that he thought it to be one of his best songs and TV presenter Tim Lovejoy said that it was one of the best records he had ever heard. However, despite all this, the single only managed to reach #45 in the UK Singles Chart which made it their worst charting single to date until June 2011 where "Good For Nothing" peaked six places lower at 51. On the other hand, the single has had an unexpected success in Peru reaching #1 in its second and third week.

== History ==
'Can't Get Along (Without You)' is the oldest song on Once Upon a Time in the West and was actually originally written with Archer's original band Contempo. It was originally going to be featured on Stars of CCTV, but was left for the follow-up album.

The single version is slightly different, it does not have the countdown at the beginning and explicit language is censored. It was mixed by Mark 'Spike' Stent.

Influenced by soul & R&B, Archer has explained the band are big fans of soul music:

"Soul music is in the DNA of Hard-Fi. We love all that 1960s soul. It’s got a beat you want to dance to and a melody you want to sing along to but it also says something that touches you emotionally. We’ve always wanted to write great songs that people can connect with and be positive and passionate rather than negative and cynical".

The song's story, as Archer explains,

"is about a man whose life falls to pieces when he leaves the girl he loves. He thinks it's the best thing to do but it's obviously not. He realises what he's done and tries to go back and fix it. Parts of it are autobiographical, you want to make a good story and spice it up a bit. Everyone's been through a situation like that".

== Music video ==
The video was first announced through a blog written by guitarist Ross Phillips on the band's MySpace page on 1 October 2007.

Last week we shot a video for the next single "Can't Get Along". In a nutshell the video is Rich being chased around Berlin by a big, rock hard looking German with a tache. Us 3 make some small cameo appearances, but other than that we sat around laughing at Rich, drinking beer and eating sausages. Happy days. This video has got it all; People smashing through windows, jumping through hedges, car chases and birds. What more could you want? Rich even did his own stunts!

Other than making videos we have begun our quest to take over the modern world. So far so good - Sell out tours of the UK (Thanks to everyone who came, we had a right laugh), NUMBER 1 ALBUM (Thanks so much to everyone who brought it) and various European shows that have been fucking great.

Next stop is Australia. We're all looking forward to it. I might buy a surf board.

The video directed by Rozan & Schmeltz, premiered on Channel 4 at 12:30pm just after Hollyoaks on 8 October 2007, much like Suburban Knights.

== Track listings ==
=== CD ===
1. Can't Get Along (Without You)
2. Little Angel (Demo)

=== 7" single 1 ===
1. Can't Get Along (Without You)
2. These Four Walls And I

=== 7" single 2 ===
1. Can't Get Along (Without You)
2. Can't Get A Dub (Without Wrongtom)

=== Track listing controversy ===
The track "These Four Walls And I" is available only through vinyl, which sparked controversy within the fanbase.

On 24 December 2007, this issue was resolved as on the iTunes Store a new Once Upon a Time in the West package was released featuring the original track listing plus "These Four Walls and I" along with the never before released "Suburban Knights (Acoustic)" and the full length mix of the "Suburban Knights Steve Angello & Sebastian Ingrosso mix".

== Charts ==
"Can't Get Along (Without You)" was listed for two weeks on the UK Singles Chart. It entered the chart at number 45 on 18 November 2007, where it dropped to number 70 the following week making it the biggest free faller of the week.

Chart (2007)	Peak position
UK Singles Chart	45
UK Download Chart	61

== Alternative covers ==
UK, 7" Vinyl 2

UK, CD, Radio Edit Edition
