= Better Do Better =

2006 single by Hard-Fi

Single by Hard-Fi

from the album Stars of CCTV
- Released: 10 April 2006
- Recorded: Staines, 2004
- Genre: indie rock, post-punk, alternative rock
- Length: 4:41
- Label: Atlantic, Necessary
- Songwriter(s): Richard Archer
- Producer(s): Wolsey White, Richard Archer

Hard-Fi singles chronology
"Cash Machine" (2005)	"Better Do Better" (2006)	"Suburban Knights" (2007)

"Better Do Better" is the fifth single from English band Hard-Fi, taken from their 2005 debut album, Stars of CCTV. It was released on 10 April 2006, when it reached number 14 on the UK Singles Chart, sharing a similar chart success with all the other singles released from Stars of CCTV. The video was directed by Richard Skinner with Alex Smith acting as cinematographer. The Maxi CD version of the single contains exclusive U-MYX software to create a mix of "Hard to Beat". The song features in the Torchwood episode "Small Worlds".

== History ==
Compared to the rest of the Stars of CCTV album, this song has a darker feel and details a relationship that has ended; the girlfriend wants to restart the relationship, but the writer rejects her.

It features saxophones and trumpets played by Kellie Santin and Nick Etwell.

The B-side "Polish Love Song" was recorded in one take backstage at the Kansas City Grand Emporium. The song pleads the case for illegal immigrant workers coming from Eastern Europe.

== Design ==
The single was created, designed and photographed by Aaron Hinchion and Matt Gibbins of communications agency ALBION. The CD cover opens up to give a bigger insight to the story told in the music. For Better Do Better it was about placing the phone in the appropriate context. The phone sits on a pub table and shows us that Tina is being deleted from the contacts list. The Tina mentioned on some of the sleeves formed a subplot throughout all the single releases, most notably on the cover for Better do Better, which probably suggests the girl in the song is "Tina". She later became a bit of a talking point both in the music press and on the fan forums. The Hard-Fi CCTV camera icon also appeared subtly on every cover in different forms.

Like all of the Hard-Fi releases, various formats carried subtle changes to differentiate them on the shelf. Making them all collectable. Better Do Better's delete message was in various stages of completion on the CD cover and 7-inch sleeve.

== Track listings ==
CD single

1. Better Do Better
2. Polish Love Song

Maxi CD

1. Better Do Better
2. Polish Love Song
3. Better Do Better (Video)
4. Hard To Beat (U-MYX Format)

7-inch

1. Better Do Better
2. Better Do Better (Wrongtom Wild Inna 81 Version)

== Charts ==
Chart (2005)	Peak position
UK Singles Chart	14
UK Download Chart	28
