= Hard-Fi =

English indie rock band

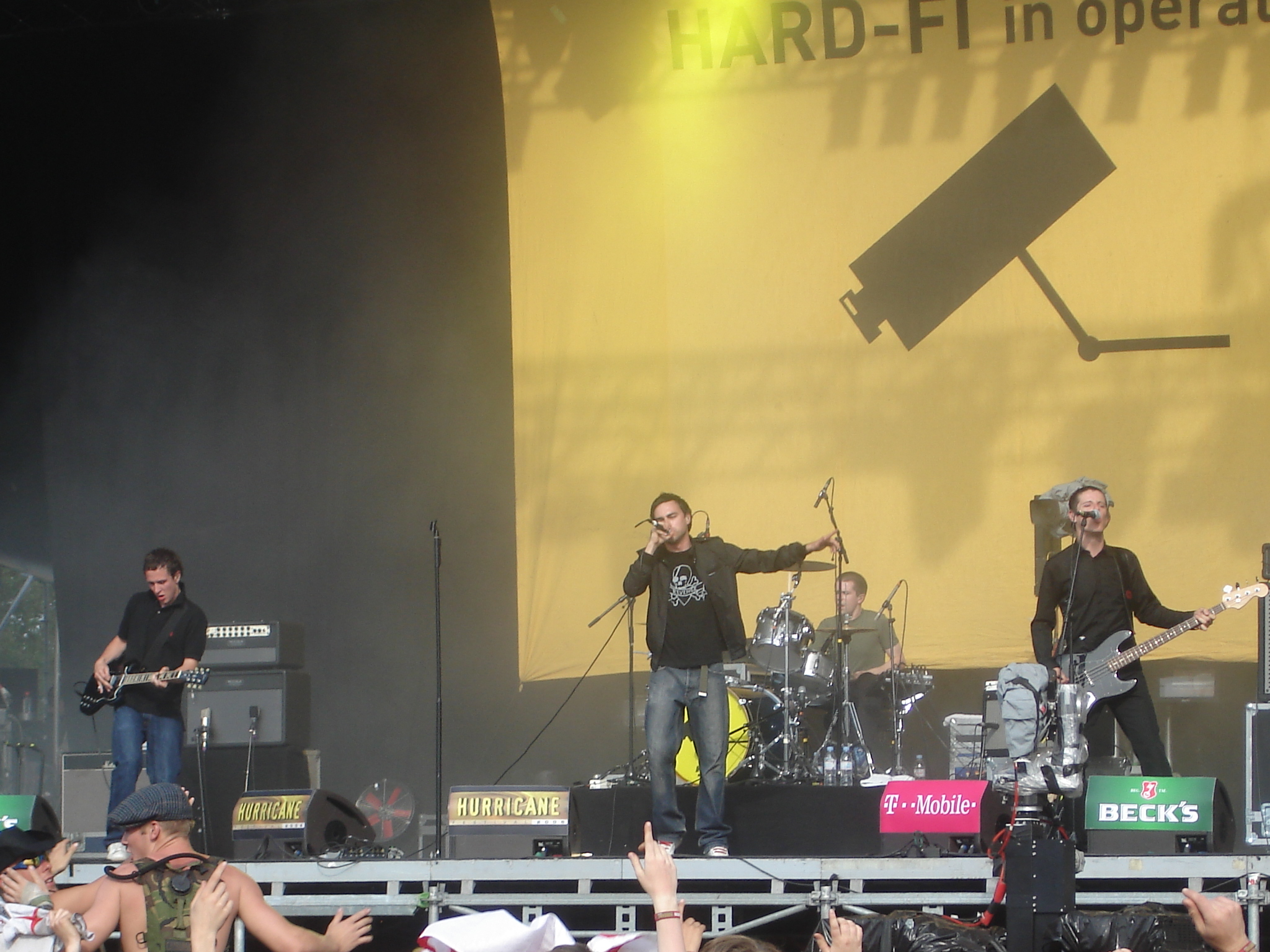
- Hard-Fi at the 2006 Hurricane Festival in Scheeßel, Germany

Background information
- Origin: Staines-upon-Thames, Surrey, England
- Genres: Indie rock; alternative rock
- Years active: 2003–2014; 2022–present
- Labels: Necessary; Atlantic
- Members: Richard Archer; Steve Kemp; Kai Stephens; Ross Phillips
- Past members: Nick Fyffe

Hard-Fi are an English indie rock band, formed in 2003 in Staines-upon-Thames, Surrey. The band consists of Richard Archer (lead vocals and guitar), Ross Phillips (guitar and backing vocals), Kai Stephens (bass guitar and backing vocals) and Steve Kemp (drums and backing vocals).

They achieved chart success with their third single, "Hard to Beat" and then followed by other successful singles such as "Living for the Weekend" and "Cash Machine", which all reached the top 20 of the UK Singles Chart. Their debut album Stars of CCTV was released on 4 July 2005, and although receiving critical acclaim (NME called it the 23rd best album of 2005 and it was nominated for the Mercury Prize and two Brit Awards; Best British Group and Best British Rock Act), it did not reach No. 1 on the UK Albums Chart until six months later on 22 January 2006. It originally entered the charts at number 6.

The band's second album Once Upon a Time in the West was released on 3 September 2007 and reached number 1 in its first week. Their third album Killer Sounds, which features the singles "Good for Nothing", "Fire in the House" and "Bring It On", was released on 19 August 2011 and debuted at number 9 on the UK Albums Chart. The band went on hiatus after releasing a greatest hits album in 2014. They reunited in 2022 and released new material in 2024.

== History ==
=== Contempo band ===
Richard Archer decided to return to his hometown of Staines, crushed by the lack of success of his former band "Contempo" and the death of his father from cancer. He said "I moved back to Staines because I ran out of money and it was quite a shock."

Archer has said that music business insiders tried to dissuade the band's manager Warren Clarke from managing him: "People told him, don't bother with Archer, he's damaged goods, you're wasting your time." When Archer asked his publishers for some money to record the new songs that he had written, they terminated his contract instead.

=== Formation and early success ===
While Archer was making demos to produce an album, he went into the Staines hi-fi shop where Ross Phillips worked, simply so he could listen to his latest demos on the shop's better equipment. Philips apparently asked Archer who had played guitar on his demos and Archer said that it was himself. Phillips said it was "shit" and was therefore recruited to play guitar for the new group. Steve Kemp was already an old friend of Archer, while it took Kai Stephens little persuasion to leave his job as a "pest killer" at Rentokil. When Stephens played guitar before joining Hard-Fi, he liked to copy chords from bands such as Led Zeppelin and Pink Floyd who are two of his favourite artists along with The Clash and hip-hop acts such as Run-DMC and N.W.A.

The band were signed to newly formed independent label Necessary Records, owned by Clarke. The majority of Stars of CCTV was recorded in a variety of unusual acoustic environments - in bedrooms, in pubs, and played back in their producer, Wolsey White's, BMW. 1,000 copies of this record were pressed with only 500 going on public sale, and the initial plan was to sell 1000 each time. However, it quickly sold out, receiving critical acclaim and radio play, proving a lot more successful than the band had imagined. Most of the album was recorded in a disused mini cab office, which cost them about £300 and is known to this day as the "Cherry Lips" Studio. The band used to try to make their music sound more atmospheric by putting a microphone in the corridor to add echo; listening closely to the record reveals that this also picked up passers-by humming and whistling and the occasional aeroplane flying overhead.

Archer desperately tried to generate publicity for the band through the Staines Observer, to no avail; "We sent them a press release and a photo," said Archer. "The press release was all like, the hard-hitting sound of the streets and stuff. And the article came out going, 'Richard Archer, former pupil of Thamesmead School ...' Whatever you say, they seem to be most interested in what school you went to."

The band were then licensed to the major label Atlantic Records in December 2004, where they were given the chance to re-record the album in the renowned Abbey Road Studios, among other well known studios, however they went back to the cab office to maintain their sound.

=== Stars of CCTV ===
The band were one of the acts opening for Green Day, alongside Taking Back Sunday and Jimmy Eat World on their two-day residency of the Milton Keynes Bowl in June 2005. Simple Plan were initially booked though cancelled only a few weeks before the show, and Hard-Fi were made as a last minute booking and opened on both days. Their debut album's launch party was scheduled to be 7 July 2005 at Cheekees nightclub in Staines, however this was cancelled due to the ill health of Richard's mother, and the London bombings also occurring that day. Her death resulted in the band pulling out of the Glastonbury festival. The launch party was rescheduled for 13 July 2005 and the venue changed to Ladbroke Grove, London.

The Stars of CCTV album re-entered the official UK album chart at No. 4 on 1 January 2006. Two places higher than it originally went in on the week of its release, the album climbed from No. 33. Stars of CCTV finally got to No. 1 on 22 January. The band's re-release of "Cash Machine" entered the official Top 40 singles chart at No. 14 on 1 January. The album has reached sales of 1.2 million copies worldwide and sales of over 600,000 in the UK alone.

Hard-Fi gained increased prominence in the UK when Stars of CCTV was nominated for the 2005 Mercury Music Prize. Stars of CCTV scored 74 out of 100 on Metacritic.

In February 2006, the band were nominated for two BRIT Awards, Best British Group and Best British Rock Act, alongside international superstars such as Gorillaz, Franz Ferdinand and Oasis. Richard spoke about the nominations, "I don't think we'll win it, especially best group when you've got Coldplay, Franz Ferdinand and Gorillaz in there, they're kind of big hitters, but you never know, Burton drew with Man United". "Last week I would have probably said 'nah it's all rubbish', but now I'm nominated it's great but what is good is that there's a real wide spread of stuff there, but there's no Best Dance award and the urban category is more pop than what's quality."

=== Once Upon a Time in the West ===
Hard-Fi expanded the "Cherry Lips", their taxi cab office which they used to record, making more room for equipment after having searched fruitlessly for a space. Archer described the record as "darker and more expansive". A working title for the Album was "Bat out of Staines".

The first single from the album was "Suburban Knights", released on 20 August. The single had its first play on 18 June 2007, at 7:20 pm (BST) on Radio 1. The album Once Upon a Time in the West was released on 3 September 2007 when the band launched it at midnight in Virgin Megastore in Oxford Street, London with a live performance from a selected set list followed by a CD signing. The following day, the band performed at Maida Vale Studios to a small audience who earned their tickets through Radio 1.

The album cover of Once Upon a Time in the West has an orange background with the album title at the top, and "NO COVER ART." written in large, white letters below. The artwork has received criticism, however, top cover art designer Peter Saville has described it as "a 'White Album' for the digital culture."

On 9 September 2007, Once Upon a Time in the West went straight in at No. 1 on the UK Albums Chart, giving Hard-Fi a second No. 1 album. It received positive reviews including five stars from The Observer Monthly and four stars from Q Magazine, scoring 70 out of 100 on Metacritic.

The album was more popular than their debut album Stars of CCTV in other countries, as it reached Japan's Top 10 chart. Mexico, Argentina, Brazil and Central America began to show interest in the band as the first single from the album, "Suburban Knights", charted in all of their respective charts, reaching No. 5 in Peru, No. 3 in Guatemala, No. 2 El Salvador, No. 8 Mexico alongside their second single "Can't Get Along (Without You)" which spent two weeks on No. 1 in Peru and Argentina. On 10 March 2008, the third single, "I Shall Overcome" was released in the UK, where it reached No. 35, whilst making the top five in South America just like the previous two singles entering in at No. 4.

=== Killer Sounds ===
During the 2008 Christmas period, Hard-Fi released a Christmas message to their fans announcing that they would be back in the new year with "a wicked new album".

On 2 February 2009, Phillips released a blog on the band's official Myspace page, saying "me and the boys are now back in the cherry lips recording facility working hard on the new tunes. Sounding great by the way. We're really pleased with how the album's shaping up. Hopefully over the next few months we'll put some bits and pieces up for you to have a listen."

On 29 October 2010, Hard-Fi made a blog posting on their website stating that they were starting production on their new album.

On 14 February 2011, Archer posted an update on the band's Facebook page, which revealed that six of the eleven album tracks had been mixed. Producers that worked with Hard-Fi on their third album include Stuart Price and Greg Kurstin. On 7 March, Hard-Fi confirmed that they are getting closer to completing the album. Archer posted a status on Facebook, saying "going back into the studio to mix the final tracks for the album, we've got two weeks booked to finish off and tweak a few bits and pieces from the last batch. Thinking about photos, a video, artwork and getting out and doing a few gigs - sooner than you might think."

On 28 April, Hard-Fi's latest single "Good for Nothing" was premiered on Zane Lowe's Radio 1 show receiving airplay as the 'Hottest Record in the World'. In an accompanying Archer announced that the album is called Killer Sounds. On 7 May, "Good for Nothing" was featured on Soccer AM's Premier League goals portion of the show. The single was then made available to listen to on Hard-Fi's official YouTube channel. Having been made available for listening on Hard-Fi's website since 22 May, "Good for Nothing" was finally released on 17 June and debuted on the UK Singles Chart at number No. 10 and on the UK Rock Chart at No. 2.

The second single to be released from the album was "Fire in the House" on 7 August 2011. Despite suggestions that it would struggle due to strong competition from contestants competing on the eighth series of The X Factor, which was ongoing at the time, Killer Sounds was officially released in the UK, Ireland and other European territories on 22 August and entered the UK Albums Chart at No. 9. "Bring It On", the third and final single, was released on 24 October 2011. Following unspecified legal difficulties, the album's USA & Canada release date was delayed until 15 March 2013.

=== Greatest hits album and hiatus ===
In March 2012, Archer told Gigwise that Hard-Fi were hoping to release their next album in a shorter interval than the four years between Once Upon a Time in the West and Killer Sounds, although no estimated release date was set. The band released some samples of studio material from the album via their official Facebook page in March 2013.

On 6 May 2013, the band announced via their Facebook page that Phillips was leaving the band to concentrate on "different things".

On 27 November 2013, it was announced that Hard-Fi would be releasing a greatest hits compilation album, Hard-Fi: Best of 2004–2014. The album was released on 27 January 2014. They also played a one-off sell out gig at the Bloomsbury Ballroom in London on 13 February 2014 along with Phillips.

=== Reunion ===
In April 2022, posters were posted in various London underground stations featuring the band's trademark yellow and black camera logo, with the text "London 01.10.22" suggesting the band would be playing their first live show since 2014. On 24 April, during a Facebook Live stream, Archer shared details of the gig, which took place at London's O2 Forum Kentish Town on 1 October. He confirmed all original members, including Ross Phillips who had previously left the band, would be present.

On 23 May 2023, the band announced their first tour in eleven years. They played at venues across England and Scotland from 5–21 October 2023.

On 20 May 2024, the band released their first new single since 2011, "Don't Go Making Plans". It was followed by an EP of the same name which was released on 15 November 2024. They also announced an accompanying tour, which took place from 16 to 30 November 2024.

=== Sweating Someone Else’s Fever ===
In March 2026, the band announced their fourth album Sweating Someone Else's Fever The album is named after an El Salvador saying about not fighting other people's ego-based battles. The album was written and recorded in 2025 and was produced by Richard Archer and Wolsey White.

The first single released was "They Ain't Your Friends", which came out in March 2026, followed by "Looking For Fun" in April 2026. The third single was the Latin-influenced "Digo Nada", which is Spanish for "I say nothing", and also featured UK-based Columbian rapper Mike Kalle.

The song "They Ain't Your Friends" was mixed by his 11 year old Son, Roland Archer. Archer says that Roland ( or "rollo" ) was playing around with Archers old Mac mini, and found two old demos and stitched them together.Archer jokingly said that Roland after the song was released was asking "so.. where is my cut?".

In 2026, Hard-Fi embarked on a tour of festivals and support acts, beginning with supporting Anssi Kela at Hard Rock House in Helsinki, Finland in January 2026 They also appeared at festivals such as The Great Fete at Hatfield House in Hertfordshire and Kendal Calling in Penrith, Cumbria. In December, they are headlining their own mini tour incorporating Bristol, London, Birmingham and Manchester.

== Musical style ==
Hard-Fi's lyrics are based mostly on working class life, the band themselves coming from a self-sufficient suburban lifestyle in Staines. This is notable in tracks such as "Suburban Knights" ("Those bills keep dropping through my door") and "Living for the Weekend" ("I've been working all week - I'm tired"), while other songs such as "Tonight", despite still being about suburban life, focus more on ambitions. Some songs are also based on social realism, "Feltham is Singing Out" is inspired by Zahid Mubarek who was sent to the Feltham Young Offenders' Institution and was murdered by his racist cellmate.

Other songs, such as "Better Do Better" and "Move on Now", are centred around the premise of how hard romantic relationships can be. Once Hard-Fi were becoming successful, Richard's mother died and the song "Help Me Please" is about how difficult it was for him having his dreams come true after many unsuccessful bands but realises he has no parents to share the joy with. Similarly, "The King" is about Richard returning to Staines and finding everything completely different, and realising everything of which he knew and loved had disappeared. He describes "Little Angel" as Christina Aguilera having a fight with The Clash in a Northern Soul club.

Archer stated that they were heavily influenced by soul and dance music.

== Name ==
"Hard-Fi" is the name given to the sound produced by Lee "Scratch" Perry, a reggae and dub artist, at his Black Ark recording studio. Being admirers of Perry's work, the band named themselves after his distinctive sound. Archer said "Since then I've been desperately trying to find the biography where I read it; but I may have dreamt it."

== Live ==
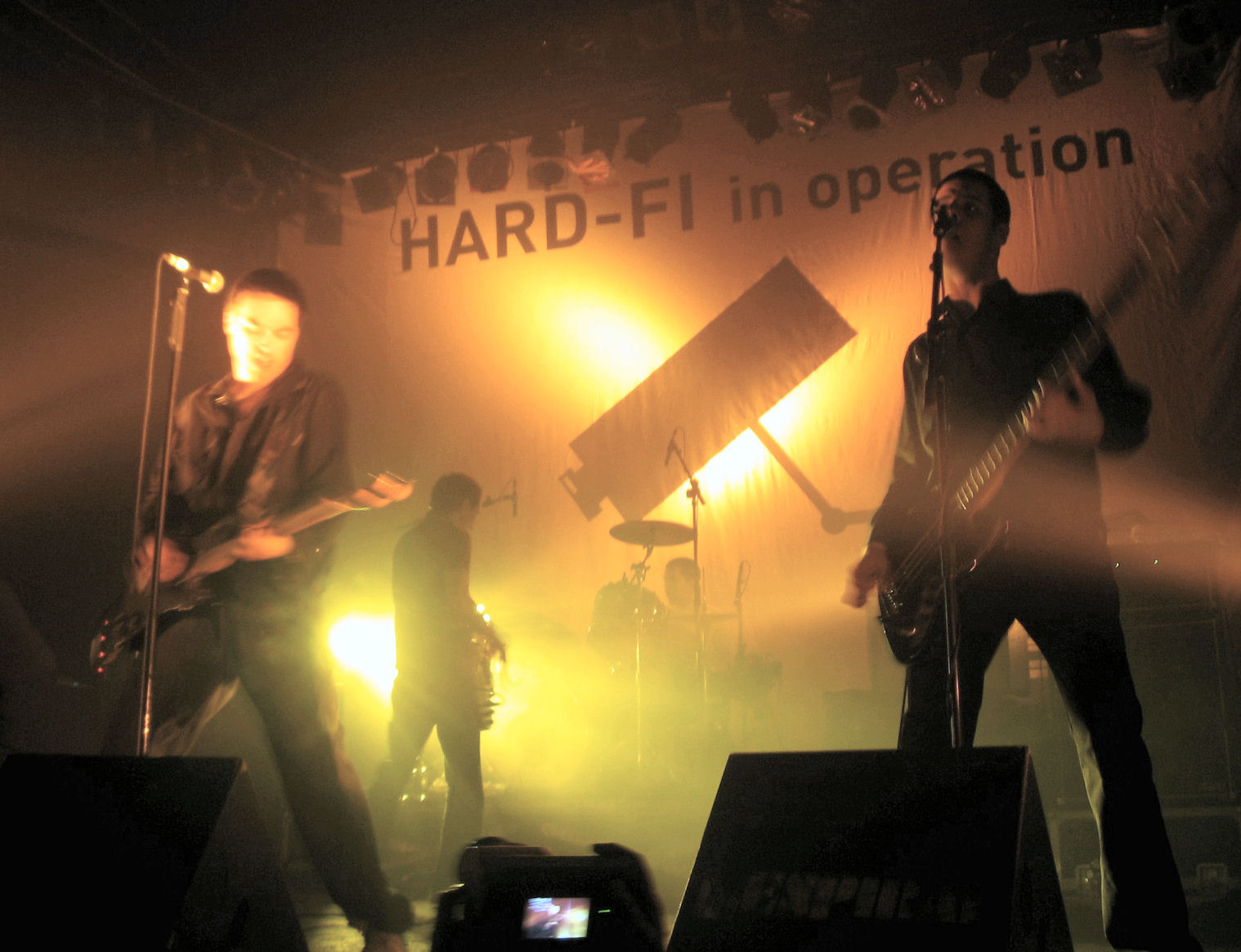
Hard-Fi in concert at Sala Caracol in Madrid, Spain, 2006

Hard-Fi's first live performance was at Manchester's "In the City" music event in 2003 before they were signed to a record label.

They played London's Brixton Academy from 14 to 18 May, making them one of the few bands to play five consecutive sold-out nights there and the first to do so off the back of their debut album. After the success of the Stars of CCTV album and of hit single "Hard to Beat", it allowed them to end up in a mini-reunion of The Specials, performing "Ghost Town" with Jerry Dammers and Neville Staples at the Love Music Hate Racism gig. Mick Jones of The Clash is a renowned fan of the band, while Paul Weller came to their rehearsal rooms and jammed a version of "Town Called Malice", something of which Kaichen Stephens says "gives us bragging rights over all of Staines". All of these artists were quite inspirational towards Hard-Fi while they were recording Stars of CCTV, perhaps The Specials and The Clash being the larger influences.

Jones also appeared with them performing "E=MC²" by his former band Big Audio Dynamite. Jones had previously helped produce tracks by Archer's prior band, Contempo who had recorded a cover of "London's Burning" by The Clash.

Hard-Fi supported Green Day at their two gigs at Milton Keynes Bowl, performing in front of approximately 65,000 people.

During December 2005, the band played at London's Astoria. The performance was filmed and released In Operation on DVD. The performance features all the tracks on Stars of CCTV plus "You And Me" and the band's version of "Seven Nation Army" by The White Stripes. It also comes with CCTVersions – a CD featuring dubbed versions of album tracks, produced by guests including Roots Manuva and DJ Wrongtom.

In February 2006, Hard-Fi played the Hammersmith Palais as part of the NME Awards shows with regular early touring partners Boy Kill Boy.

In September 2006, the band played their first (and to date only) shows in Australia, performing in Melbourne, Sydney, Brisbane and Perth.

The band played a series of sold-out, intimate dates later in July 2007 previewing the record. The UK Festival Awards nominated the event in the category for Most Memorable Moment.

Each concert from the band's December UK Tour was recorded in its entirety on audio CD which could be ordered online through Concert Live or bought at the venue for £20. The CD was titled Once Upon a Time in December. It was bundled with the next single "I Shall Overcome".

== Discography ==
Studio albums

- Stars of CCTV (2005)
- Once Upon a Time in the West (2007)
- Killer Sounds (2011)
- Sweating Someone Else’s Fever (2026)

Hard-Fi have their own video podcast, which is known as Hard-Fi: Rockin' the City, available on their website, iTunes, Myspace page and YouTube channel. In 2007 Hard-Fi: Rockin' the City was nominated for "Best Podcast" at the Digital Music Awards.
