= Suburban Knights =

2007 single by Hard-Fi

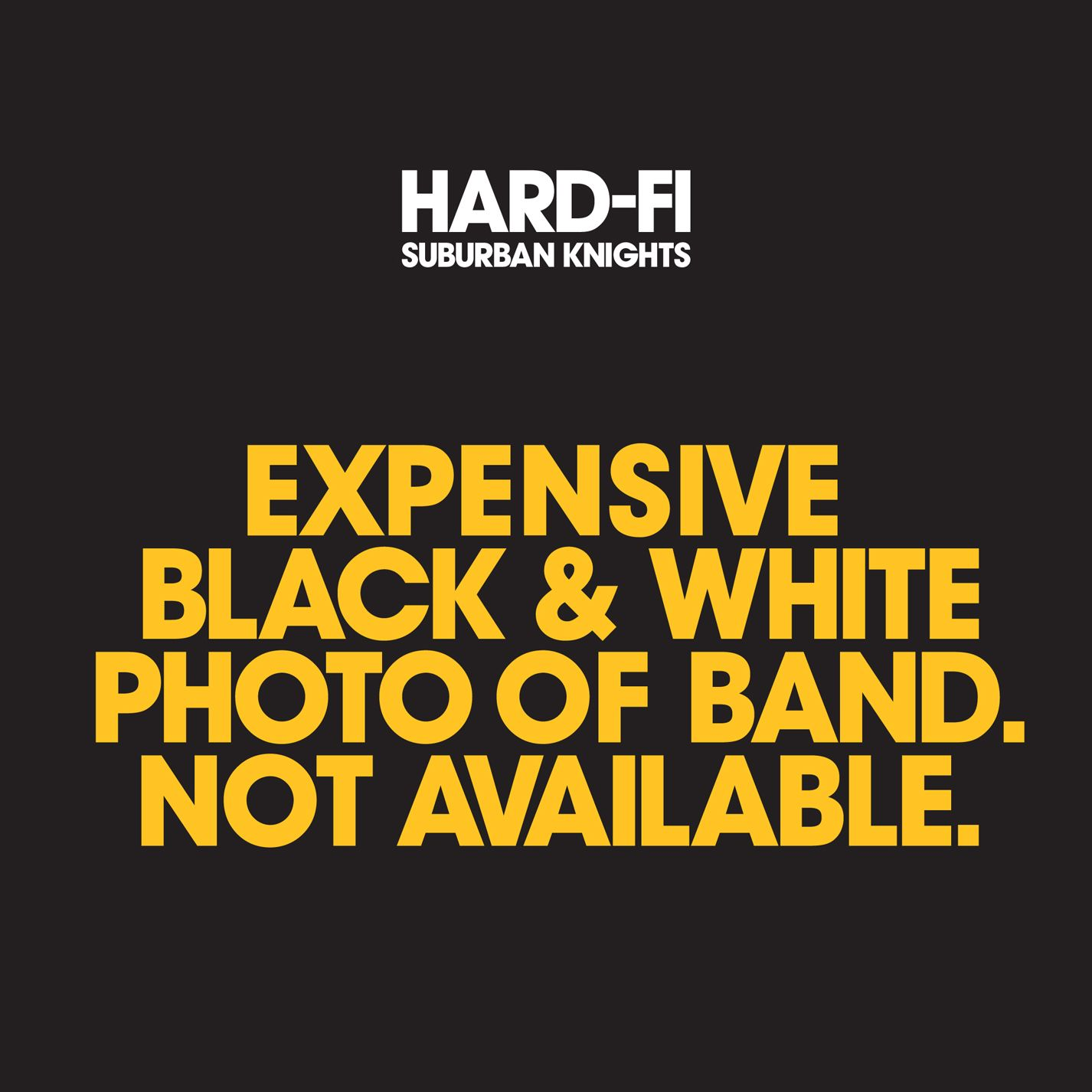

Single by Hard-Fi

from the album Once Upon a Time in the West
- Released: 6 August 2007
- Genre: Indie rock
- Length: 4:29
- Label: Warner Music
- Songwriter: Richard Archer
- Producers: Wolsey White, Richard Archer

Hard-Fi singles chronology
"Better Do Better" (2006)	"Suburban Knights" (2007)	"Can't Get Along (Without You)" (2007)

"Suburban Knights" is the first single from British rock band Hard-Fi's second studio album Once Upon a Time in the West. The physical format of the single was released on 20 August 2007, the digital version was released on 6 August 2007. It reached #7 on 26 August 2007, becoming the band's most successful single in the UK Charts.

The song received its first airplay on Soccer AM on 19 May when the band appeared on the show. Only about 15 seconds of the intro of the song was played however. Later, the single received its first radio play on 20 June, featuring on Zane Lowe's BBC Radio 1 show. The song was nominated for best track at the 2007 Q Awards.

In Peru, "Suburban Knights" reached number 5, while the next single "Can't Get Along (Without You)" did even better in the same chart, hitting number 1.

This song has been played on popular teen programmes Hollyoaks and Waterloo Road. This song was also featured on the Network Ten sports show Sports Tonight in Australia. "Suburban Knights" also features in the soundtrack of Turn 10's Xbox 360 racing game, Forza Motorsport 3.

== Background and composition ==
"Suburban Knights" samples Toots and the Maytals' song "Funky Kingston" from the album of the same name. It began as a rough demo that had already been created by the time Stars of CCTV had been released and is also one of the older tracks on the album Once Upon a Time in the West. Richard Archer says that it began as just the chorus and the backing vocals. The band started working on it while on tour and played it live a couple of times. "We never said it has to be the first single, we just felt like it was a nice bridge between the first and second albums", Archer told NME. Variations of the track were performed live, sounding slightly different from what became the final version.

Archer describes it as being about various things and having your head in lots of places at once.

It's about being felt left out and degraded, people looking down on others, journalists slagging off people from suburban areas and dreams being out of reach among other things such as having nothing to do and having no money. There's not much in suburban towns so you have to be creative. We've toured the world and have met many people much like ourselves, from suburban areas, we were always told to celebrate where we're from and fight back. Suburban Knights is just made to celebrate the amazing people who live in the real world. You have to be creative living in suburbia and we wanted to celebrate that.

== Music video ==
The music video directed by Ben Crook features the band playing in front of many satellite dishes in North Woolwich being filmed by a video camera. This is then broadcast on to many television sets around the UK and eventually around the world. It ends with Richard Archer switching off the transmission with a television remote control.

The video was first broadcast in the UK on 11 July at 11:30 pm on Channel 4 and has been featured in the top 10 UK airplay. When discussing the making of the music video the band said

"Our fave part of the video was when it finished. Videos are really long days, so the best bits are the make up artists, the catering and going home at the end."

== Track listings ==
CD single

1. "Suburban Knights"
2. "Suburban Knights" (Steve Angello & Sebastian Ingrosso mix)

7" single 1

1. "Suburban Knights"
2. "You And Me"

7" single 2

1. "Suburban Knights"
2. "Suburban Knights" (DJ Wrong Tom's delight mix)

== Charts ==
=== Weekly charts ===
Chart (2007)	Peak position
Belgium (Ultratip Bubbling Under Flanders)	17
Germany Singles Top 100	79
Ireland Singles Top 50	15
Switzerland Airplay (Swiss Hitparade)	62
UK Singles Chart	7

=== Year-end charts ===
Chart (2007)	Position
UK Singles (Official Charts Company)	131

== Alternative covers ==
UK (promo)

UK (12")
