= Steve Kemp (musician) =

English drummer (born 1978)

- Born: Steven Michael Kemp; 29 December 1978 (age 47)
- Origin: Lancashire, England
- Genres: Alternative rock, indie rock, punk rock
- Occupation: Drummer
- Instrument: Drums
- Years active: 2001—present
- Website: www.hardfiofficial.com

Steven Michael "Steve" Kemp (born 29 December 1978) is an English drummer. He is the drummer of alternative rock band Hard-Fi.

== Career ==
Originally from Lancashire, Kemp went to Morecambe High School before he moved to London in his late teens to take a musical course at Brunel University London. He was originally a drummer for a DJ called Wrong Tom, who happened to be a friend of Richard Archer. Through this link, when Archer was scouting for members to be in his band, he asked Kemp to join.

In December 2007, he slammed bands such as Led Zeppelin and The Police for charging their fans £100 for tickets to their live concerts. He said, "I know these old bands have a huge legacy but paying over £100 for a ticket is a joke. If it's a band you really love, of course you want to go and see them-but why should you then pay so much money for it? These rock 'n' roll dinosaurs are coming out for a last pay cheque. I don't know what they're going to do on stage that's so special". He then joked, "I think we should split up in November, just to get back together in December. See if it makes us more famous. Maybe we could have November off and get back together in December and call it the reunion tour. The few remaining tickets will sell out in no time. It will be a winner. It will be perfect."

== Personal life ==
Kemp suffers from Crohn's disease and did an Open University degree in nutrition. He is also a keen fisherman and a qualified fly fishing instructor.

Kemp is a fan of Liverpool F.C. He and his bandmates performed at the 2012 FA Cup final, where Liverpool lost to Chelsea.
