= Hard to Beat =

2005 single by Hard-Fi

Single by Hard-Fi

from the album Stars of CCTV
- B-side: "Stronger"; "Seven Nation Army"
- Released: 20 June 2005
- Length: 4:34 (album version); 4:14 (radio edit)
- Label: Necessary; Atlantic
- Songwriter: Richard Archer
- Producers: Wolsey White; Richard Archer

Hard-Fi singles chronology
| "Tied Up Too Tight" (2005) | "Hard to Beat" (2005) | "Living for the Weekend" (2005) |

Alternative covers
- Alternative cover

"Hard to Beat" is the third single from English indie rock group Hard-Fi, from their album Stars of CCTV. It was Hard-Fi's first of two top-10 singles, reaching number nine in the United Kingdom after being released on 20 June 2005. In the United States, the song was released as the second single from Stars of CCTV on 18 April 2006, following "Cash Machine". It gained the band some prominence in the US by entering the US Billboard Hot Modern Rock Tracks chart at number 39 a month after release, later peaking at number 34.

== History ==
This was the band's favourite song to perform live, as lead singer Richard Archer said, "'Hard to Beat' is going crazy at the moment. We were in Bristol yesterday and I was wondering if my voice was going to last on tour, but the crowd sings it for me, so that's going well. But the most fun playing is probably 'Unnecessary Trouble', that's always a good laugh, and 'Living for the Weekend' is the last number, so is a high energy one, but after last night, Hard To Beat."

B-side "Stronger" was originally performed by Richard Archer's previous band Contempo.

On 22 June 2023, to mark 18 years since the song's release, Hard-Fi released a Spotify playlist called "Still Hard to Beat". It is made up of songs which inspired "Hard to Beat" and includes "Red Alert" by Basement Jaxx, "Pump Up the Jam" and "Music Sounds Better with You".

== Chart performance ==
The track entered the UK Singles Chart at number nine, its peak position, and stayed on the chart for 27 non-consecutive weeks.

== Music videos ==
There are two music videos: the first one, with the band performing in a diner, was directed by Scott Lyon and the other one, created for the US, was directed and edited by George Vale with help from Merlin Bronques on some of the stills.

The one earning more airplay is the one directed by Scott Lyon. Shot on 20 April 2005, it was mostly filmed in Cheekees disco in Staines, where a party is shown going on. The since-closed Cheekees disco was somewhere that members of the band would visit frequently, but a remark by Archer caused a minor riff with the owner. In a newspaper article, Archer described the disco as being "like a bad wedding," which offended the owner. In defence, Archer said "But everyone likes a bad wedding so I don't see what the problem is; it was more of a complement."

For the video directed by Scott Lyon, there was an opportunity for fans to be in the video as crowd members. Those interested in attending had to send a photo of themselves.

== Track listings ==
UK CD1

1. "Hard to Beat"
2. "Tied Up Too Tight" (BBC Radio 1 Live Lounge)

UK CD2

1. "Hard to Beat"
2. "Stronger"
3. "Hard to Beat" (video)
4. "Tied Up Too Tight" (video)
5. "Caught on CCTV" (video)

UK limited-edition 7-inch single

A. "Hard to Beat" – 4:14
B. "Better Dub Better" – 5:03

UK 12-inch single

A. "Hard to Beat" (album version)
B. "Hard to Beat" (Axwell mix)

European CD single

1. "Hard to Beat" – 4:13
2. "Seven Nation Army" – 4:13

European maxi-CD single

1. "Hard to Beat"
2. "Stronger"
3. "Seven Nation Army"
4. "Hard to Beat" (video)

Australian CD single

1. "Hard to Beat"
2. "Stronger"
3. "Seven Nation Army"

== Charts ==
=== Weekly charts ===
| Chart (2005–2006) | Peak position |
|---|---|
| Germany (GfK) | 80 |
| Netherlands (Single Top 100) | 73 |
| Scottish Singles Sales (Official Charts) | 11 |
| UK Singles (Official Charts) | 9 |
| US Modern Rock Tracks (Billboard) | 34 |

=== Year-end charts ===
| Chart (2005) | Position |
|---|---|
| UK Singles (OCC) | 123 |

== Certifications ==
| Region | Certification | Certified units/sales |
|---|---|---|
| United Kingdom (BPI) | Gold | 400,000^{‡} |
^{‡} Sales+streaming figures based on certification alone.

== Usage in the media ==
"Hard to Beat" was used by Sky Sports as the theme for its pay-per-view channel, PremPlus.

During a live performance of Cinderella on Musicool, which was reworked in a modern day setting, the song "Hard to Beat" was featured among other songs such as "Genie in a Bottle" by Christina Aguilera and "I Predict a Riot" by Kaiser Chiefs.

A remix of "Hard to Beat" by London Elektricity headlined the release of Hospital Records' "Weapons of Mass Creation 3" LP in April 2007.

The song is featured in the PlayStation 2 video game, SingStar Rocks!.

This song was used frequently during worldwide broadcasts of the 2008 Summer Olympics, as well as during broadcasts of the 2005 Ashes series, and the English Super League.

This song was also used on the Nine Network's The Footy Show in Australia, as well as the Seven Network's coverage of the 2009 V8 Supercars Nikon GP and the Nine Network's coverage of the 2010 Winter Olympics.
