= Stars of CCTV =

Studio album by Hard-Fi
- Released: 4 July 2005
- Recorded: 2004–2005
- Studio: The Cherry Lips Hits Facility (Staines-upon-Thames, England)
- Genres: Indie rock; post-punk revival
- Length: 45:06
- Labels: Necessary; Atlantic
- Producers: Richard Archer; Wolsey White

Hard-Fi chronology
Stars of CCTV (2005)	In Operation (2006)

Singles from Stars of CCTV
- 1. "Cash Machine" Released: 24 January 2005; 2. "Tied Up Too Tight" Released: 14 March 2005; 3. "Hard to Beat" Released: 20 June 2005; 4. "Living for the Weekend" Released: 5 September 2005; 5. "Better Do Better" Released: 27 February 2006

Alternative covers
- Stars of CCTV mini-album

Stars of CCTV is the debut studio album by English indie rock band Hard-Fi. It was first released on 4 July 2005 through Necessary Records and Atlantic Records. It received positive reviews from critics and was nominated for the 2005 Mercury Music Prize.

The album initially entered the UK album chart at number six in July 2005 but, following the success of a December 2005 re-issue of their debut single "Cash Machine", it rose to number one in January 2006, eventually being certified double-platinum (600,000+ sales) in the UK and with total sales of 1.2 million worldwide.

The song "Gotta Reason" is included on the soundtrack of the football video game FIFA 06 and the baseball video game MLB 06: The Show.

To mark its 20th anniversary, the album was reissued on 4 July 2025 in vinyl form.

== Background ==
The majority of Stars of CCTV was recorded in a variety of unusual acoustic environments – bedrooms, pubs, and played back in Hard-Fi producer Wolsey White's BMW. 1,000 copies of this record were pressed with only 500 going on public sale, and the initial plan was to sell 1,000 each time. However it quickly sold out, receiving critical acclaim and radio play, proving a lot more successful than the band had imagined. Most of the album was recorded in a disused mini cab office, which cost them about £300, and it is known to this day as the "Cherry Lips" Studio (due to the colour of the paint on the walls). The band tried to make their music sound more environmental by putting a microphone in the corridor, which added echo, but background noises caused by people walking past or planes flying overhead could be heard while the band recorded. These background noises can still be heard on the record. The band used the TL Audio Fatman compressor for the album, Archer said "It's alright, it's cheap, you don't have to know what you're doing...".

Stars of CCTV was originally released as a mini-album, a very limited release which sold out very quickly. A few months after, the album had been going on sale on websites such as eBay for £25. Talking about the situation, frontman Richard Archer said;

"We had no money but time was a luxury that we did have. So we spent a year planning, then recording it ourselves, and we did all the artwork ourselves too. Even our website was designed by us. We got a book out of the library so we could learn how to do it. Then we had to do it again cos it was a right palaver. So after all that, things took off really quickly and went crazy in the space of two months, which was quite surprising."

== Release ==
The album's launch party was scheduled for 7 July 2005 at Cheekees night club in Staines (where their top ten single "Hard to Beat" was filmed), but this was cancelled due to the ill health of Richard's mother, and the London bombings also occurring that day. Her death resulted in the band pulling out of the Glastonbury festival. The launch party was rescheduled for 13 July 2005 and the venue changed to Ladbroke Grove, London. Richard says that he is no longer friends with Cheekee because of an incident involving him describing his nightclub to a newspaper like "a bad wedding". Richard defended himself by saying "...but everyone likes a bad wedding so I don't see what the problem is."

After a successful campaign by Atlantic, the Stars of CCTV album re-entered the official UK album chart at No. 4 on 1 January 2006. Two places higher than it originally went in on the week of its release. It reached No. 1 on 22 January 2006. The band's re-release of "Cash Machine" entered the official Top 40 singles chart at No. 14 on 1 January.

The album was listed for 102 weeks in 7 different charts and was certified 2× platinum by the BPI. Its first appearance in the UK Albums Chart was the Top 75 in week 28 in 2005 with its last appearance being week 40 in 2007 in the UK Albums Chart Top 75. Its peak position was number 1 on the UK Album Chart.

== Critical reception ==
Professional ratings
Aggregate scores
Source	Rating
Metacritic	74/100
Review scores
Source	Rating
AllMusic	3.5/5 stars
Entertainment Weekly	8.3/10 (17 Mar 2006, p.114)
The Guardian	3/5 stars
MusicOMH	favourable
NME	9/10
Pitchfork	7.3/10
Rolling Stone	3/5 stars

Stars of CCTV received positive reviews from critics. Review aggregating website Metacritic reports a normalized score of 74 out of 100 based on 22 professional reviews, indicating "generally favourable reviews".

The NME described the album as "the album of the year" and gave the album 9/10 in a very positive review.

Dave Simpson of The Guardian gave the album three stars out of five, writing that "Hard-Fi's edge over more derivative rivals lies in a formula that delivers old Specials and Clash reggae vibes with the big-tune ratio of a boy band". He however deemed some of the later tracks on the album "filler".

In a 3.5/5 star review for AllMusic, MacKenzie Wilson wrote that "They sound like a garage band while delving into the monotony of everyday suburban life, referring to their small town upbringing. Thus a raw kind of work ethic gradually emerges on Stars of CCTV. Their formula of snappy choruses and tight guitar hooks, particularly on "Middle Eastern Holiday" and "Gotta Reason," captures Hard-Fi's youthful presentation".

== Track listing ==
All tracks are written by Richard Archer, except where noted.

Stars of CCTV track listing
No.	Title	Length
1.	"Cash Machine"	3:42
2.	"Middle Eastern Holiday"	3:44
3.	"Tied Up Too Tight"	4:48
4.	"Gotta Reason"	2:49
5.	"Hard to Beat"	4:13
6.	"Unnecessary Trouble"	3:44
7.	"Move on Now"	5:08
8.	"Better Do Better"	4:37
9.	"Feltham Is Singing Out"	4:36
10.	"Living for the Weekend"	3:42
11.	"Stars of CCTV"	3:58
Total length:		45:06

Stars of CCTV mini-album track listing
No.	Title	Length
1.	"Cash Machine"	3:42
2.	"Hard to Beat"	4:13
3.	"Middle Eastern Holiday"	4:48
4.	"Stronger"	3:23
5.	"Hard to Beat" (mix)	3:28
6.	"Gotta Reason"	2:49
7.	"Feltham Is Singing Out"	4:36
8.	"Move on Now"	5:08
9.	"Cash Machine" (Wrongtom mix)	3:43

Bonus tracks
No.	Title	Writer(s)	Length
12.	"Seven Nation Army" (The White Stripes cover)	Jack White	4:14
13.	"Sick of It All"		3:15
14.	"Stronger"		3:31

== Charts ==
=== Weekly charts ===
Chart (2005–2006)	Peak position
Austrian Albums (Ö3 Austria)	47
Dutch Albums (Album Top 100)	91
French Albums (SNEP)	68
German Albums (Offizielle Top 100)	20
Ireland Albums Top 75	5
Italian Albums (FIMI)	79
Scottish Albums (Official Charts)	1
UK Albums (Official Charts)	1
UK Album Downloads (Official Charts)	23
US Top Heatseekers Albums (Billboard)	17

Chart (2025)	Peak position
Hungarian Physical Albums (MAHASZ)	17

=== Year-end charts ===
Chart (2005)	Position
UK Albums (OCC)	55
Chart (2006)	Position
UK Albums (OCC)	51
Chart (2007)	Position
UK Albums (OCC)	195

== Certifications ==
Region	Certification	Certified units/sales
Ireland (IRMA)	2× Platinum	30,000^{^}
United Kingdom (BPI)	2× Platinum	600,000^{^}
^{^} Shipments figures based on certification alone.

== Singles ==
5 singles were released from Stars of CCTV.

Like all of the Hard-Fi releases, various formats carried subtle changes to differentiate them on the shelf, making them all collectable, such as "Hard to Beat"'s changing sky to "Living for the Weekend"'s countdown to 18:00.

The Tina mentioned on some of the sleeves formed a subplot throughout all the single releases. She later became a talking point both in the music press and on the fan forums.

Information
"Cash Machine"
- Released: 26 January 2005
- Chart positions:
  - Chart Ineligible
"Tied Up Too Tight"
- Released: 4 April 2005
- Chart positions:
  - #15 UK singles chart
"Hard to Beat"
- Released:

20 June 2005 (UK)
18 April 2006 (United States)

- Chart positions
  - #9 UK singles chart
  - No. 9 UK Singles Downloads Chart
  - No. 34 US Modern Rock
  - No. 80 Germany
"Living for the Weekend"
- Released: 19 September 2005
- Chart positions:
  - #15 UK singles chart
  - No. 27 UK Singles Downloads Chart
"Cash Machine" (re-release)
- Released: 26 December 2005
- Chart positions:
  - #14 UK singles chart
  - No. 15 US Modern Rock
  - No. 39 Ireland
  - No. 60 Sweden
  - No. 75 Germany
"Better Do Better"
- Released: 10 April 2006
- Chart positions:
  - #14 UK singles chart
