= Richard Archer =

British musician (born 1977)

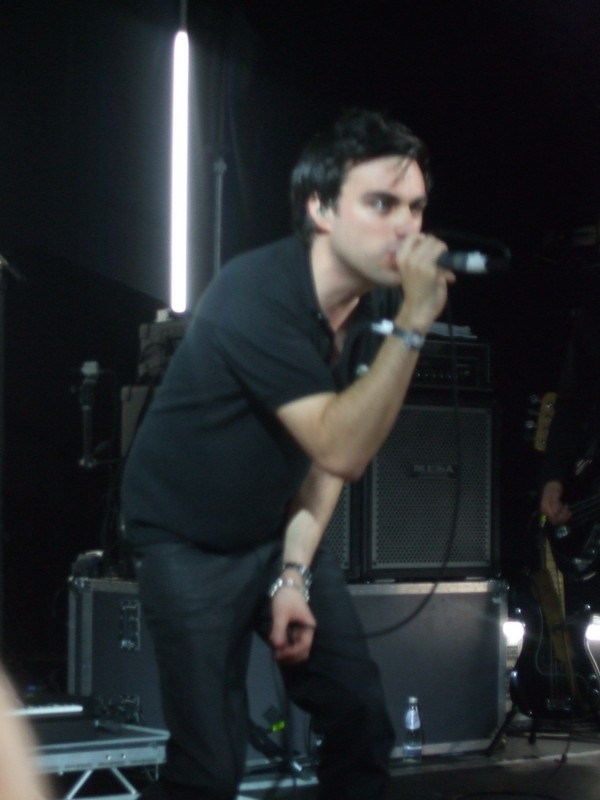
- Archer performing live in London in 2008

Background information
- Also known as: Rich
- Born: 18 January 1973 (age 53); Staines-upon-Thames, Surrey, England
- Genres: Alternative rock, indie rock
- Occupation: Singer-songwriter
- Instruments: Vocals, electric guitar, melodica, piano, keyboard
- Label: Atlantic Records
- Member of: Hard-Fi
- Formerly of: Contempo

Richard Archer (born 18 January 1977) is an English singer-songwriter and guitarist. He is the lead vocalist, guitarist, principal songwriter and main composer of indie rock band Hard-Fi. Hard-Fi have produced several top 10 hits and two No. 1 albums. The influence of Archer's hometown of Staines is often evident in his lyrics. He fronted a band called Contempo from 1997 until 2001.

== Early life and education ==
Archer was born in Staines-upon-Thames, Surrey. He is a music graduate from Kingston University. He grew up in Staines, a suburban location of North West Surrey which is a huge influence in the lyrics of the songs he has written with band Hard-Fi. Archer explains, "There's no record shops, there's no decent pubs, there's no venues, there's no decent clothes shops. Look around, it's quite pleasant but if you're a young person living here then you're into a certain type of music – chart house – and a certain fashion, and if you're not into that there is nothing here for you. Here, you can't get home if you're out in central London after eleven. There's no night bus, there's no late train, you have to get a cab if you can find one and that'll charge you eighty quid to get home from central London. A lot of people live like that."

== Career ==
=== 1997–2000: Contempo ===
Contempo formed in Staines-upon-Thames during the summer of 1997, originally going by the name "Parachute".

Mick Jones produced demos that were intended to be released as an album in 2000 but whose release was delayed and eventually cancelled. Some of these tracks have been reworked as Hard-Fi songs.

Contempo's first release was a limited 7" vinyl on the Blue Dog label with the tracks "On The Floor" and "Stronger" (the latter also released as a b-side for the Hard-Fi single Hard to Beat).

In November 2000 Contempo announced they had left London Records after months of a mutually tense relationship. After these events, Contempo released a six track EP called "This Is Contempo", which featured the ska song "Ain't Going Out Tonight" on their own label "Nu-Suburban Sounds". Another album, "Contempo – The Demos", was a bootleg CD featuring demos of what would become Hard-Fi tracks: "Better Do Better", "Can't Get Along (Without You)", "Living for the Weekend", "Move On Now" and "Unnecessary Trouble".

Archer asked his publishers for some money to record new songs that he had written, but they terminated his contract instead.

=== 2003–present: Hard-Fi and Axwell Λ Ingrosso ===
Archer went back to his home town of Staines, "I moved back to Staines because I ran out of money and it was quite a shock," he says. "There's no record shops, there's no decent pubs, there's no venues, there's no decent clothes shops. Look around, it's quite pleasant but if you're a young person living here then you're into a certain type of music – chart house – and a certain fashion, and if you're not into that there is nothing here for you. Here, you can't get home if you're out in central London after eleven. There's no night bus, there's no late train, you have to get a cab if you can find one and that'll charge you eighty quid to get home from central London. A lot of people live like that."

Archer formed Hard-Fi whose line up includes Ross Phillips on lead guitar, Kai Stephens on bass, and Steve Kemp on drums, who also provided drums for Contempo as their career was coming to an end.

In the wake of Contempo splitting up, Archer claims that music business insiders tried to dissuade the band's manager Warren Clarke (not the actor of the same name) from managing him. "People told him, don't bother with Archer, he's damaged goods, you're wasting your time'."

When talking about how the band met, Archer said:

I kind of started the band. I got introduced to the drummer by a guy who remixed our debut album. We then put an ad in the NME, Loot and all the places to find musicians. Loads of people got back to us. None of them were right. Some of them literally couldn't play a note.

I knew Kai from back in Staines. After a bit of ringing around I got in contact with him. He still played bass but worked for Rentokill. He turned up at our studio a few days later having learnt all the songs I sent him. He was great and he was in! Also he had a van to move stuff about. You can't get clamped in a Rentokill van!

Ross worked in the local Hi-Fi store. I'd go in there to listen to my mixes. One day he came over to me and said "who's playing guitar on this?" It's me. He said it was shit. So I said come on then. After looking for people all over the country we found a band that all came from Staines. It gives us a real sense of identity.

The band were signed to newly formed independent label, Necessary Records, owned by Clarke. The majority of Stars of CCTV was recorded in a variety of unusual acoustic environments – in bedrooms, in pubs, and played back in their producer, Wolsey White's, BMW car. 1000 copies of this record were pressed with only 500 going on public sale, and the initial plan was to sell 1000 each time. However, it quickly sold out, receiving critical acclaim and radio play, proving a lot more successful than the band had imagined. Most of the album was recorded in a disused mini cab office, which cost them about £300, and is known as the "Cherry Lips" Studio. The band used to try to make their music sound more environmental by putting a microphone in the corridor, which added echo, however, people would walk past whistling or humming; the faint sound of aeroplanes flying overhead can be heard on the record.

Archer desperately tried to generate publicity for the band through the local paper, the Staines Observer, without success. "We sent them a press release and a photo," said Archer. "The press release was all like, the hard-hitting sound of the streets and stuff. And the article came out going, 'Richard Archer, former pupil of Thamesmead School ...' Whatever you say, they seem to be most interested in what school you went to."

The band were licensed to the major record label Atlantic Records in December 2004, where they were given the chance to re-record the album, in the Abbey Road Studios among other well known studios. However, the band went back to the mini cab office to maintain their sound.

Hard-Fi finally saw success with their debut album Stars of CCTV reaching No. 1 in the UK Albums Chart and followed up with another No. 1 record Once Upon a Time in the West. The band went on to be nominated for the prestigious Mercury Prize in 2005 and BRIT Awards among others. Archer wrote all the songs on the albums, while the "Hard to Beat" single featured a track called "Stronger" which he had originally written with Contempo.

In 2010, Archer recorded vocals for a track produced by Swedish DJ Axwell, entitled "Think About It" at the time. The track was then re-produced around 2015 by Axwell and his counterpart Swedish DJ & Producer, Sebastian Ingrosso, as the then-newly formed duo, Axwell Λ Ingrosso. The song was renamed to "Thinking About You" and released on 27 May 2016, still featuring Archer on vocals.

In 2020, Archer was a member of the band OffWorld which was made up of himself, Krysten Cummings, Wolsey White, Smiley Barnard and Dale Davis. The genre they were in was a mixture of blues, gospel and soul. Their EP, Brave to Be Alive was released on April 9. Later that month they released a single, "Burnt Out Star". An event that month was a performance by Archer and Cummings. They did a set of songs from his home. The songs were from the EP and some of the Hard-Fi songs. It was part of the Royal Albert Home sessions. The songs were transmitted from the homes of the artists while the Royal Albert Hall was closed.

In 2021, Archer co-produced Afters by The Helicopter Of The Holy Ghost, an act featuring members of The Bluetones, Engineers and theaudience.

=== Friendship with Mick Jones ===
Archer first met Mick Jones when he was with Contempo. The band were looking for a producer when one of the members of the record company recommended Jones, to which the band agreed.

After working on the band's first record for a year, things did not turn out as planned due to problems with the record company.

On 1 March 2008, rumours started appearing that the two would be forming a new band after Archer joined Jones and his new band, Carbon/Silicon, during a show in London. They revealed that they were thinking about combining the two bands to form a project called "Hard Carbon".

== Personal life ==
In 2006 there was a story generated by the media that Archer was having a relationship with Scarlett Johansson while she was filming Woody Allen movie Scoop in London. Archer had never said anything of the sort. It did in fact turn out to be a false rumour, which was confirmed when Johansson declared "I've never met him, and until all this started, I'd never even heard of him". One newspaper accused Archer of creating the rumours himself. He says:

"A paper phoned our manager and said: 'We know he’s dating Scarlett Johansson, her people have told us.' We told them it wasn’t true and that I’d never even met her. They ran the story anyway, saying I was secretly dating Scarlett Johansson. A week later they ran another story saying her people were denying it and that: 'Richard Archer, from Hard-Fi, is a fantasist.' and that I'd made the whole thing up for publicity. The wankers. It was quite funny until I ended up looking like a prick."

In the same year, Archer was nominated for "Sexiest Male", alongside Liam Gallagher and Pete Doherty who actually won the award, Archer told Britain's Cosmopolitan magazine, "At the NME awards, I was nominated for Sexiest Man but I didn't win it... Pete Doherty did."
