= Necessary Records =

UK record label

- Founded: 2 September 2002
- Founder: Warren J. Clarke
- Status: Active
- Genre: Rock
- Country of origin: United Kingdom
- Location: London
- Official website: Necessary Records

Necessary Records is a record label based in the UK, founded by Warren Clarke, a former A&R executive at London Records and Edel, in 2003. Clarke describes that the label was born out of a creative necessity. "It's an outlet for records that should and must be heard. An outlet for artists that deserve to and will, touch the widest possible audience."

It is most notable for being the record label of English indie rock band Hard-Fi

The label was responsible for the release of Hard Fi's debut album, Stars of CCTV, before the label secured a two album worldwide licensing deal with Atlantic, which saw the album re-released in the UK and subsequently nominated for a Mercury Prize and two Brit Awards. The album also peaked at #1 in the UK albums chart in January 2006, reaching sales of 1.2 million copies worldwide, with over 830,000 in the UK alone. The band's second album, Once Upon a Time in the West, released by Necessary/Atlantic, also reached #1 on the UK album charts. The band's third album, Killer Sounds, released by Necessary/Atlantic went to #9 on the UK album charts.

Necessary also have a publishing and management company.

== Artist roster ==
- Nights
- Distophia
- Hard-Fi
- Maupa

== See also ==
- Lists of record labels
