= Catfights and Spotlights =

2008 studio album by Sugababes

Studio album by Sugababes
- Released: 17 October 2008
- Recorded: June 2008–September 2008
- Genres: Pop; funk; R&B
- Length: 46:27
- Label: Island
- Producers: Klas Åhlund; Steve Booker; Si Hulbert; The Invisible Men; Melvin Kuiters; Taio Cruz

Sugababes chronology
Change (2007)	Catfights and Spotlights (2008)	Sweet 7 (2010)

Singles from Catfights and Spotlights
- 1. "Girls" Released: 20 September 2008; 2. "No Can Do" Released: 19 December 2008

Catfights and Spotlights is the sixth studio album by British girl group Sugababes. It was released on 17 October 2008, through Island Records. Produced primarily by Klas Åhlund, Steve Booker, and The Invisible Men, the album incorporates sounds of pop, R&B, funk, and soul.

The album was preceded by the release of its lead single, "Girls", which reached number three on the UK singles chart, while reaching the top fifteen in Ireland and Scotland. The album's second and final single, "No Can Do", reached number 23 on the UK singles chart.

Upon release, Catfights and Spotlights received generally positive reviews from critics, who considered the album to be one of the group's most consistent releases, and praised the influences of funk and soul. However, some critics noted a lack of a standout track and suggested that the album contained too many ballads. The album reached number eight on the UK Albums Chart, and peaked within the top twenty in Ireland and Scotland.

== Background and release ==
In an interview with The Guardian in March 2008, the Sugababes revealed that they were making plans for their sixth studio album, with members Keisha Buchanan and Heidi Range describing the group as more confident in their creative opinions. The group had originally intended to begin work on the album in 2009, but began writing in June after opportunities to work with new producers arose.

In August 2008, it was revealed that the Sugababes were working with Orson's lead singer Jason Pebworth, who described the songs they were recording together as taking the group in a "funkier direction". In a subsequent interview, the group described the album as showcasing their vocal ability, while having a "maturer" and "mellower" sound. Its title, Catfights and Spotlights, was revealed the following month on the music website Popjustice, and on the Sugababes official website. In October, the group said that the album had been recorded in a few weeks between festival performances, with the intention for it to be ready for the Christmas sales period.

Catfights and Spotlights was released on 17 October 2008 in Ireland, followed by a 20 October release in the United Kingdom, and in other territories throughout the remainder of the month. Sugababes worked extensively with Swedish producer Klas Åhlund on the album, known for his work with Swedish singer-songwriter Robyn and American singer Britney Spears, alongside contributions from Karen Poole, Melvin Kuiters, Max Martin, Simon Hulbert, Steve Booker, and The Invisible Men, among others.

== Composition ==
Catfights and Spotlights incorporates elements of pop, funk, soul and R&B, with the group describing themselves as "banning electro pop" from the album's production in favour of a "live band feel" drawing on retro and soul sounds. In an interview with Newsbeat, Amelle Berrabah described the album as having some "quite dark" songs, although the lyrics were intended to be "tongue in cheek", with Buchanan adding that the group could "relate" to what they were writing more so on this album as they had experienced "relationships that didn't quite work out".

== Promotion ==
=== Live performances ===
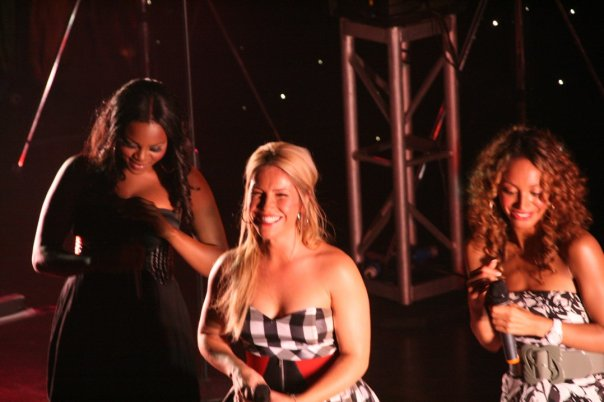
Sugababes performing in June 2008

In support of Catfights and Spotlights, the Sugababes made several television and concert appearances between October 2008 and July 2009, including at the MOBO Awards on 15 October 2008, where they performed "Girls" and "She's Like a Star" with Taio Cruz. The group appeared on the ITV Divas II special on 23 November, where they performed "Girls". On 10 December, the group performed "Girls" at the Capital Jingle Bell Ball. In July 2009, the group headlined the Ponty's Big Weekend festival in Pontypridd, Wales, where they performed a setlist of songs including "Girls" and "No Can Do".

=== Singles and music videos ===
In August 2008, the group announced the title and release date of the album's first single "Girls". The song was digitally released on 20 September 2008, followed by a physical release on 6 October. Its accompanying music video was directed by Daniel Wolfe, and premiered on 5 September 2008 on Channel 4. The song samples the chorus of "Here Come the Girls" (1971) by Ernie K. Doe, which had been featured in the British pharmacy store chain Boots' Christmas advert in 2007. As a result of the popularity of "Girls", it was used in the 2008 version of the advert, replacing the original song by Ernie K. Doe. "Girls" reached number three on the UK singles chart, and earned a silver certification in the country.

The album's second and final single, "No Can Do", was digitally released on 19 December 2008, followed by a physical release on 29 December. The song's music video was directed by Marco Puig, and premiered on 20 November 2008. An extended play was released alongside "No Can Do" which features three remixes of the song and a BBC Radio 1 Live Lounge performance of its B-side, "Spiralling". "No Can Do" reached number 23 on the UK singles chart, and brought the Sugababes total single sales in the country to three million.

== Critical reception ==
Professional ratings
Review scores
Source	Rating
AllMusic	4.5/5 stars
Digital Spy	3/5 stars
Evening Standard	3/5 stars
The Guardian	3/5 stars
musicOMH	1.5/5 stars
Planet Sound	3/5 stars
The Sunday Times	4/5 stars
The Times	3/5 stars

AllMusic editor Matthew Chisling called Catfights and Spotlights the "group's strongest showing to date". He felt that the album took the band "into a new dimension of artistic merit, flashing impeccable songwriting skills and flourishing arrangements thanks to the help of immaculate production, which throws the girl into a retro bodysuit yet never feels stale [...] Catfights and Spotlights is the true reflection of a girl group's transition from shallow pop stardom into full-fledged recording artistry." Lucy Davies from BBC Music found that the album "bounds out like a Kate Moss Rimmel ad, all metallic, sharp-sure and savvy", and added: "The trouble with the Sugababes' sound has always been keeping the balance between blending and preserving individuality, and they've managed it here on the whole." Digital Spy's Nick Levine remarked that "Catfights and Spotlights is mellower and more classic-sounding than previous Sugababes records, with loads of strings and a conspicuous lack of synths, but it's no less polished and commercially-minded." Popjustice called Catfights and Spotlights "the most 'complete' Sugababes album since their first."

In his review for The Guardian, Dorian Lynskey noted "a general transition from crisp modernity towards self-consciously grown-up, Duffyesque soul". Indeed, half of it is as colourless as promised, but the half credited to Swedish songwriter/producer Klas Ahlund is unflaggingly terrific [...] Sugababes have always lacked a reliably sympathetic ally who can pull the best from them: a Xenomania to their Girls Aloud. In Ahlund, they might just have found one." The Times reviewer Priya found that "Sugababes are attempting to put some electricity back into their sound" with the album. While he felt, that the band "make the 1960s sound their own [and] recall the urban angst that made us fall in love with them [...] the throaty-voiced Amelle Berrabah is no replacement for the soulful, feisty pipes of the former member Mutya Buena." Planet Sound felt that "mainly working with new producers has mixed success for the girlband". The Teletext music page noted "too many ballads" on the album, "but just enough singles here not to disrupt momentum". Elan Mark Edwards from The Sunday Times wrote, that "there are 14 tracks on Catfights and Spotlights, and there isn't a single turkey among them".

== Commercial performance ==
In the United Kingdom, Catfights and Spotlights debuted at number eight on the UK Albums Chart, with 23,123 copies sold in its first week. It became the Sugababes' fifth consecutive top ten album on the chart, but their first to miss the top three since One Touch (2000). The album was certified gold on 13 February 2009 by the British Phonographic Industry (BPI), denoting sales of 100,000 copies. In Scotland, the album reached number ten on the Scottish Albums Chart. In Ireland, the album reached number 18 on the Irish Albums Chart. Elsewhere, Catfights and Spotlights reached number 22 in Greece, number 31 in Croatia, and number 34 on the European Top 100 Albums chart.

=== Retrospective comments ===
The album's commercial performance received mixed reactions from the group. In an interview with the Daily Star in November 2008, Heidi Range described its sales as "disappointing", although she argued that this was not a reflection of its quality and attributed the underperformance partly to a lack of promotion. Conversely, in an interview with Digital Spy in December, Keisha Buchanan said "a top ten album is really good and that's what we got", explaining that she believes people put "too much emphasis on having a number one". Speaking to The Guardian in July 2009, Buchanan said the group remained "really proud" of the album despite its lack of commercial success, and explained that if the group had "stayed in the place we were in [on Change], we would never move on". However, she admitted that the group had become complacent, saying "we had put ourselves in boxes and said we were just singers". Range added "we took our eye off the ball and didn't concentrate on the performance and styling side", believing that people were primarily interested in hearing them sing.

== Track listing ==
Standard edition
No.	Title	Writer(s)	Producer(s)	Length
1.	"Girls"	Allen Toussaint; Anna McDonald; Nicole Jenkinson; Keisha Buchanan	Melvin Kuiters; Si Hulbert	3:11
2.	"You on a Good Day"	Klas Åhlund; Buchanan	Åhlund	3:27
3.	"No Can Do"	Jason Pebworth; Jon Shave; George Astasio; Geeki	The Invisible Men; Si Hulbert	3:11
4.	"Hanging on a Star"	Pebworth; Shave; Astasio; Geeki; Buchanan	The Invisible Men; Hulbert	3:22
5.	"Side Chick"	Åhlund; Alex Purple; Buchanan	Åhlund	3:40
6.	"Unbreakable Heart"	Åhlund; Max Martin	Åhlund	3:52
7.	"Sunday Rain"	Steve Booker; Karen Poole; Buchanan; Amelle Berrabah; Heidi Range	Booker	4:01
8.	"Every Heart Broken"	Åhlund	Åhlund	4:09
9.	"Beware"	Åhlund; Berrabah	Åhlund	2:56
10.	"Nothing's as Good as You"	Pebworth; Shave; Astasio; Geeki	The Invisible Men; Hulbert	3:03
11.	"Sound of Goodbye"	Booker; Poole; Buchanan	Booker	4:23
12.	"Can We Call a Truce"	Åhlund; Purple; Deanna; Buchanan	Åhlund	4:33
13.	"About You Now" (acoustic version)	Cathy Dennis; Lukasz Gottwald	Dr. Luke	2:46
Total length:				46:27

International version
No.	Title	Writer(s)	Producer(s)	Length
14.	"She's like a Star" (with Taio Cruz)	Taio Cruz	Cruz	2:42
Total length:				49:15

Alternate international version
No.	Title	Length
14.	"Girls" (radio edit)	3:12
Total length:		49:26

iTunes Store alternate version
No.	Title	Writer(s)	Producer(s)	Length
14.	"She's like a Star" (with Taio Cruz)	Taio Cruz	Cruz	2:42
15.	"Girls" (radio edit)			3:12
16.	"Girls / Watershed" (music video)			3:18
Total length:				55:41

Sampling

- "Girls" contains elements of Ernie K-Doe's "Here Come the Girls", as written by Allen Toussaint.
- "No Can Do" contains a sample of "Yes, It's You" written by Nugetre.

== Personnel ==
Credits adapted from Apple Music.

=== Musicians ===
- Keisha Buchanan – lead vocals (all tracks)
- Heidi Range – lead vocals (all tracks)
- Amelle Berrabah – lead vocals (all tracks)
- Melvin Kuiters – programming (tracks 1, 3–4, 10), keyboards (tracks 3, 10)
- Si Hulbert – programming, keyboards (tracks 1, 3–4, 10)
- Scott Garland – alto saxophone (track 1)
- Graham Russell – trumpet (track 1)
- Victoria McCuminsky – background vocals (track 1)
- Klas Åhlund – programming, guitar, percussion, piano (tracks 2, 5–6, 8–9), bass (tracks 2, 5–6, 9)
- Phat Fabe – programming (tracks 2, 5, 8, 12)
- Viktor Brobacke – horn (track 2)
- Per "Ruskträsk" Johansson – horn (track 2)
- Jon Shave – programming, keyboards (tracks 3–4, 10)
- Jason Pebworth – programming, keyboards (tracks 3–4, 10)
- George Astasio – guitar (tracks 3–4), bass guitar (tracks 3–4, 10)
- Nichol Thompson – trombone (track 3)
- Henry Collins – trumpet (track 3)
- Jim Hunt – saxophone (track 3)
- Miriam Stockley – additional vocals (track 3)
- Richard Adlam – programming, guitar (track 3)
- Hal Ritson – programming, guitar (track 3)
- Tengan – programming (track 5)
- Steve Booker – programming, keyboards, guitar (tracks 7, 11)
- Stockholm Strings – strings (tracks 8–9, 12)
- David Nyström – programming (tracks 8–9, 12)
- Dave Whitmey – keyboards (track 13)

=== Technical ===
- Dave Palmer – engineering (tracks 1, 3), mixing engineer (tracks 4, 10)
- Tom Elmhirst – mixing engineer (track 1)
- Dan Parry – assistant mixing engineer (track 1)
- Jeremy Wheatley – mixing engineer (tracks 2–3, 5–6, 8–9, 12)
- Richard Edgeler – assistant mixing engineer (tracks 2–3, 5–6, 8–9, 12)
- Matt Lawrence – recording engineer (track 3)
- Xavier Stephenson – assistant recording engineer (track 3)
- Spencer Dewing – engineering (track 3)
- Si Hulbert – mixing engineer (tracks 4, 10)
- Sam Wheat – assistant recording engineer (tracks 4, 10)
- Neil Tucker – engineering (tracks 4, 10)
- Steve Booker – mixing engineer (tracks 7, 11)
- Jon Kelly – assistant recording engineer (tracks 7, 11)
- Andrew Thornton – mixing engineer, recording engineer (track 13)

== Charts ==
Chart (2008)	Peak position
Croatian Albums (HDU)	31
European Top 100 Albums (Billboard)	34
Greek International Albums (IFPI)	22
Irish Albums (IRMA)	18
Scottish Albums (OCC)	10
UK Albums (OCC)	8

== Certifications ==
Region	Certification	Certified units/sales
United Kingdom (BPI)	Gold	100,000^{^}
^{^} Shipments figures based on certification alone.

== Release history ==
Release dates and formats
Region	Date	Format(s)	Label	Ref.
Ireland	17 October 2008	CD; digital download	Island	
United Kingdom	20 October 2008	CD; digital download	Island	
France	20 October 2008	CD; digital download	Island	
Australia	28 October 2008	CD; digital download	Island	
