= No Can Do =

Single by Sugababes

from the album Catfights and Spotlights
- B-side: "Spiralling"
- Released: 19 December 2008
- Recorded: Metropolis Studios; (London, England)
- Genre: Pop; soul; R&B
- Length: 3:10
- Label: Island
- Songwriters: Jason Pebworth; Jon Shave; George Astasio; Vanessa Brown
- Producers: The Invisible Men; Si Hulbert

Sugababes singles chronology
"Girls" (2008)	"No Can Do" (2008)	"Get Sexy" (2009)

Music video
- "No Can Do" on YouTube

"No Can Do" is a song by British girl group Sugababes from their sixth studio album, Catfights and Spotlights (2008). It was written by Jason Pebworth and George Astasio of The Invisible Men, Jon Shave and VV Brown, and produced by The Invisible Men in collaboration with Si Hulbert. The song was released in the United Kingdom and Ireland on 19 December 2008 as the album's second and final single. "No Can Do" is a pop song with influences of R&B and soul. It contains a sample of Sweet Charles Sherrell's "Yes It's You", and contains influences of Motown music and songs performed by The Jackson 5.

The song received mixed reviews from critics, who were ambivalent towards its Motown influence. "No Can Do" peaked at number 23 on the UK Singles Chart and is one of the group's lowest-charting singles in the UK. The single also charted on the Danish and Slovak airplay charts. The music video for "No Can Do" was directed by Marco Puig, and was inspired by a piece of pop created by Allen Jones in the 1960s. It features the group using twenty half-naked men as objects such as cars, motorcycles and bridges. The Sugababes performed the song in November 2008 to promote the release of the New Xbox Experience, and at Ponty's Big Weekend in July 2009.

== Background and release ==
Following the release of their fifth studio album, Change (2007), and the completion of its supporting tour, the Sugababes announced that they would take a year-long break to record their sixth studio album. Despite the announcement, the trio soon began work on the album, titled Catfights and Spotlights, which they eventually recorded within a matter of weeks and in between various festivals. "No Can Do" was co-written and co-produced by The Invisible Men team members Jason Pebworth and George Astasio. The two musicians co-wrote the song in collaboration with Jon Shave and VV Brown, and co-produced it with Si Hulbert. The song was programmed collectively by Hulbert, Shave, Pebworth and Melvin Kuiters, mixed by Jeremy Wheatley and engineered by Dave Palmer. "No Can Do" was recorded at Metropolis Studios in London, England.

"No Can Do" was released as the second and final single from Catfights and Spotlights. When Digital Spy questioned group member Keisha Buchanan about her reaction to its release, she responded: "I'm really excited about it. I'm looking forward to people hearing another side to the album. This single has got a kind of Jackson 5 feel to it which I love. The whole album has got a really old-school, laid-back Motown sound, so hopefully 'No Can Do' will get more people interested in the album." "No Can Do" was released as a digital download in the United Kingdom and Ireland on 19 December 2008. The following day, it was made available as a CD single, which consists of three remixes of the track and a cover version of Keane's song "Spiralling".

== Composition and lyrics ==
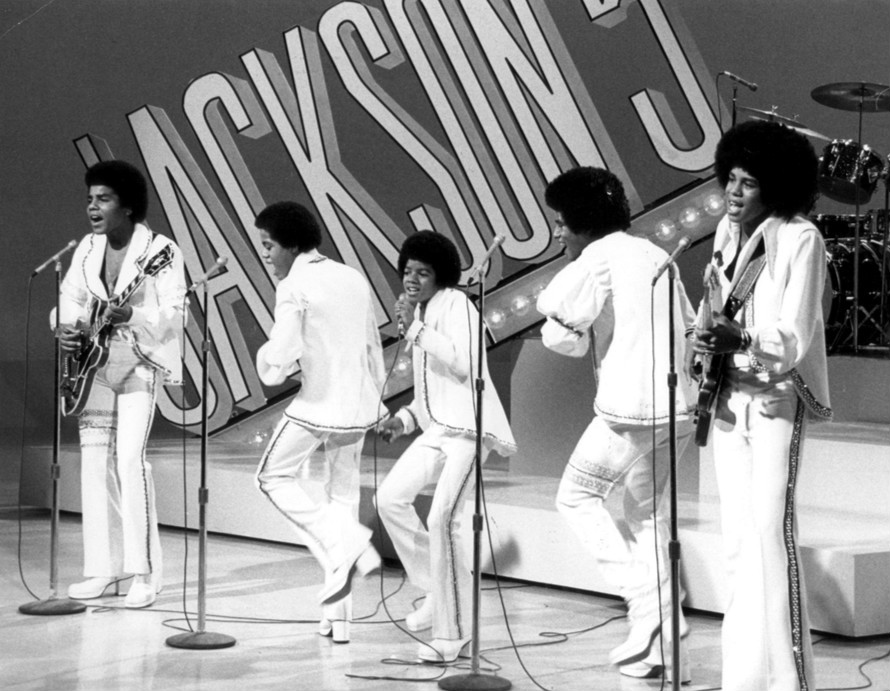
"No Can Do" received comparisons to songs performed by The Jackson 5.

"No Can Do" is an uptempo pop song with influences of soul and R&B. It features prominent bass instrumentation provided by the keyboard, guitar, trombone, trumpet, saxophone and brass. "No Can Do" is based around a sample of Sweet Charles Sherrell's "Yes It's You", as written and produced by Nugetre and Hal Ritson, respectively. The song is largely inspired by Motown music and is reminiscent of songs performed by The Jackson 5, namely their 1969 song "I Want You Back". The Motown influences are most evident within the song's beat. The record's influences also derive from the music of girl groups from the 1960s. According to the digital sheet music published at Sheet Music Direct, "No Can Do" was composed in the key of G major using common time, with a tempo of 96 beats per minute.

Matthew Chisling of AllMusic noted that the song "[builds] on the recurring themes of enticing harmonies and vocal showcasing which are seen as the most dominant traits that the girls are showing off this time around". The lyrics of "No Can Do" address the riddance of a boyfriend, following the group's "trademark super-energised big goodbye songs". Buchanan stated during an interview with BBC's Sarah Jane Griffiths that the lyrics are "about your partner treating you really bad and you saying, 'Not any more. Or No Can Do'".

== Response ==
=== Critical reception ===
Critical reception for "No Can Do" was mixed. David Balls of Digital Spy gave the song a two out of five star rating, and wrote, "in comparison to the majority of the group's singles, it's a half-hearted, bland and middle of the road offering that lacks the excitement of Sugababes at their best". He did, however, call the song an improvement from the group's previous single "Girls". A writer from Orange criticised the song's incorporation of multiple genres as "less than the sum of its parts". The reviewer was also unfavourable of the sampling of "Yes It's You", which was noted as "giving the ladies' warblings a strange air of karaoke with the wrong lyrics" as a result of its resemblance to "I Want You Back". The writer concluded the review by stating that "things are just a little lacklustre; the trio's vocals are still strong, but missing the sass that made them famous".

Entertainment.ie's Lauren Murphy regarded "No Can Do" and album track "Side Chick" as "feeble uptempo tracks that sound like they've been plucked at random from a pop factory conveyor belt". A writer from the Daily Record commented that "as much as ['No Can Do'] is mainstream and poppy, it's hardly their most remarkable offering". Popjustice considered the song to be "above average" but not the best track from the album, while Fraser McAlphine of the BBC Chart Blog wrote that it "won't be the all-conquering pop superbeast that it could be". A positive response came from AllMusic writer Matthew Chisling, who considered the song to be a "show-stopping [number]" and stated that it "work[s] as shimmering displays of subtle strength". Virgin Media's Johnny Dee praised inclusion of the Motown beat, which according to him makes the song "feel retro and modern simultaneously.

=== Commercial performance ===
"No Can Do" entered the UK Singles Chart on 13 December 2008 at number 170, based on digital downloads from Catfights and Spotlights. Upon its release as a single, the song peaked at number 23 in the issue dated 10 January 2009 with 12,890 copies sold. Subsequently, "No Can Do" became the group's lowest-charting single since 2006's "Follow Me Home" and their third-lowest charting single overall. The song is also one of their lowest-selling singles to date. "No Can Do" brought the Sugababes' total single sales in the UK to three million. The single also peaked at number eleven on the Danish airplay chart, number 53 on the Slovak airplay chart, and number 67 on Billboard's European Hot 100 Singles chart.

== Music video ==
The music video for "No Can Do" was directed by Marco Puig. The video was filmed in November 2008. On YouTube, it was released on 2 December 2008. The video's inspiration stemmed from a piece of art created by the sculptor Allen Jones in the 1960s, involving the use of female mannequins as everyday pieces of furniture. The Sugababes wore glamorous gowns and had large hair and long eyelashes for the video, which features twenty muscly men who are used as pieces of furniture. TBalls described the video as "a little racier than we'd expect from Keisha and Co", but acknowledged that "it's nice to see the girls letting their hair down for a change". He compared it to the music video for Kylie Minogue's 2003 single "Slow". VV Brown, the co-writer of "No Can Do", stated that she did not expect the video to be racy: "Being very honest, I didn't see in that way. I saw the song as more fun and cheeky, rather than sassy and glossy like that."

== Live performances and impact ==
The trio first performed the song in November 2008 to promote the release of the New Xbox Experience, as part of a set list that included their singles "Push the Button" and "About You Now". They performed "No Can Do" on 18 July 2009 at Ponty's Big Weekend, which was held at Ynysangharad Park in Pontypridd, Wales, and dedicated the performance to Michael Jackson who died a month earlier. Buchanan named "No Can Do" one of her favourite songs from the Sugababes' career, stating: "I love 'No Can Do' because it's such a different sound for us. I really like the whole old-school, laid-back sound and it's got a kind of Jackson 5 feel to it which I love."

== Formats and track listings ==
- Digital download
1. "No Can Do" – 3:10
- Extended play
1. "No Can Do" (Wawa Club Remix) – 6:31
2. "No Can Do" (Bimbo Jones Remix) – 5:48
3. "No Can Do" (Mowgli Remix) – 5:48
4. "Spiralling" (Radio One Live Lounge) – 3:10
- CD Single
1. "No Can Do" – 3:10
2. "No Can Do" (Bimbo Jones Remix) [Edit] – 5:48
3. "No Can Do" (WAWA Remix) [Edit] – 5:48
4. "Spiralling" (Radio One Live Lounge) – 3:10

== Credits and personnel ==
Recording

- Vocals recorded at Metropolis Studios, London
- Brass recorded at Rollover Studios

Personnel

- Songwriting – Jason Pebworth, Jon Shave, George Astasio, Vanessa Brown
- Production – The Invisible Men, Si Hulbert
- Vocals – Keisha Buchanan, Heidi Range, Amelle Berrabah
- Keyboards – Si Hulbert, Melvin Kuiters, Jon Shave, Jason Pebworth
- Programming – Si Hulbert, Melvin Kuiters, Jon Shave, Jason Pebworth
- Additional production – Melvin Kuiters
- Mixing – Jeremy Wheatley at Twenty One Studio, London
- Mixing (assistant) – Richard Edgeler
- Engineering – Dave Palmer
- Guitar – George Astasio
- Bass – George Astasio
- Trombone – Nichol Thompson
- Trumpet – Henry Collins
- Saxophone – Jim Hunt
- Brass engineering – Spencer Dewing
- Vocal engineering – Matt Lawrence
- Vocal engineering (assistant) – Xavier Stephenson

Sample

- Samples "Yes It's You" by Sweet Charles Sherrell
  - Songwriting – Nugetre
  - Production – Hal Ritson
  - Guitar – Guthrie Govan
  - Bass – Guthrie Govan
  - Drums – Richard Adlam
  - Keyboards – Hal Ritson
  - Programming – Hal Ritson
  - Violin – Hal Ritson

Credits are adapted from the liner notes of Catfights and Spotlights.

== Charts ==
Chart (2009)	Peak position
Denmark Airplay (Tracklisten)	11
European Hot 100 (Billboard)	67
Hungary (Editors' Choice Top 40)	18
Slovakia Airplay (ČNS IFPI)	53
UK Singles (Official Charts Company)	23
UK Airplay (Music Week)	9

== Release history ==
Country	Date	Format	Label
Ireland	19 December 2008	Digital download	Island Records
United Kingdom	19 December 2008	Digital download	Island Records
Ireland	19 December 2008	Extended play	Island Records
United Kingdom	19 December 2008	Extended play	Island Records
Ireland	20 December 2008	CD single	Island Records
United Kingdom	20 December 2008	CD single	Island Records
