= Girls (Sugababes song) =

2008 single by Sugababes

Single by Sugababes

from the album Catfights and Spotlights
- B-side: "Don't Look Back"
- Released: 20 September 2008
- Recorded: 2008
- Genre: Pop
- Length: 3:12
- Label: Island
- Songwriters: Anna McDonald; Nicole Jenkinson; Allen Toussaint; Keisha Buchanan
- Producers: Si Hulbert; Melvin Kuiters

Sugababes singles chronology
"She's like a Star" (2008)	"Girls" (2008)	"No Can Do" (2008)

Music videos
- "Girls" (Pre-watershed version) on YouTube
- "Girls" (Watershed version) on YouTube

"Girls" is a song by British girl group Sugababes from their sixth studio album Catfights and Spotlights (2008). It was written by band member Keisha Buchanan along with Anna McDonald and Nicole Jenkinson, while production was helmed by Si Hulbert and Melvin Kuiters. The song was released on 20 September 2008 as the lead single from Catfights and Spotlights. The song is built around an interpolation of "Here Come the Girls" (1970) by American singer Ernie K-Doe.

In comparison to their previous lead singles, "Girls" saw more moderate success throughout Europe. It peaked at number 3 in their native United Kingdom and number 5 in Scotland. "Girls" is used as the one of two theme songs of Dagens Mand, the Danish version of Taken Out.

== Release and reception ==
"Girls" received positive reviews from critics. Nick Levine from Digital Spy stated that "Around it they've built a brassy, funky, Ronsonish pop song with lyrics that push all the usual female empowerment buttons. The result is smart, catchy and very, very 2008 – and it sounds pretty good on the radio too. But it's also the first lead single from a Sugababes album that it's difficult to get excited about". Lucy Davies from BBC Music found that the song has them "happily stomp their attitudes all over it until you can't remember it being anyone else's."

Two weeks prior to its physical release, "Girls" debuted at nine on the UK Singles Chart, solely based on downloads. The following week, it rose to four, before eventually reaching its peak of three for the week of 13 October 2008, becoming Sugababes' first lead single not to top the chart since their debut "Overload" in 2000. In Ireland, the song peaked at number 12 on the Irish Singles Chart. Though "Girls" was not officially released in the United States, it was used in commercials to promote the American shoe store Payless and the department store J. C. Penney in 2009.

== Music video ==
The music video for "Girls" was filmed on 28 August 2008, and directed by Daniel Wolfe. The video premiered on 4Music and Channel 4 on 6 September 2008.

While Big Brother: Celebrity Hijack contestant Latoya Satnarine is featured in a cameo appearance, Buchanan invited her boyfriend Dean Thomas to star in a supporting role in the video. After recruiting female fans to star in the video, producers denied accusations they were being unfair by failing to pay those who starred in the video. A spokesman for the band later stated: "No professional dancers are being asked to do anything for free. This is an opportunity for people who don’t dance for a living but who fancy their chances."

== Formats and track listings ==
UK CD single
No.	Title	Writer(s)	Producer(s)	Length
1.	"Girls" (Radio Edit)	Anna McDonald; Nicole Jenkinson; Allen Toussaint; Keisha Buchanan	Melvin Kuiters; Si Hulbert	3:12
2.	"Don't Look Back"	Ronald White; Smokey Robinson	Jony Rockstar	3:10
3.	"Girls" (Danny Dove & Steve Smart Club Mix)	McDonald; Jenkinson; Toussaint; Buchanan	Kuiters; Hulbert; Danny Dove^{[a]}; Steve Smart^{[a]}; Nathan C.^{[a]}	6:31
4.	"Girls" (Dennis Christopher Remix)	McDonald; Jenkinson; Toussaint; Buchanan	Kuiters; Hulbert; Dennis Christopher^{[a]}; Mark Simmons^{[a]}	7:20

European 2 Track CD single
No.	Title	Writer(s)	Producer(s)	Length
1.	"Girls" (Radio Edit)	Anna McDonald; Nicole Jenkinson; Allen Toussaint; Keisha Buchanan	Melvin Kuiters; Si Hulbert	3:12
2.	"Girls (Funkerman Remix)"	Anna McDonald; Nicole Jenkinson; Allen Toussaint; Keisha Buchanan	Melvin Kuiters; Si Hulbert	6:55

Notes

- ^{^a} signifies additional producer

== Credits and personnel ==
Credits adapted from the liner notes of Catfights and Spotlights.

- Amelle Berrabah – vocals
- Keisha Buchanan – vocals, writing
- Tom Elmhirst – mixing
- Scott Garland – saxophone
- Si Hulbert – keyboards, production, programming
- Nicole Jenkinson – writing
- Melvin Kuiters – production
- Anna McDonald – writing
- Dave Palmer – engineering
- Dan Parry – mixing assistance
- Heidi Range – vocals
- Mike Stevens – vocal production
- James Treweek – brass

== Charts ==
=== Weekly charts ===
Chart (2008)	Peak position
Czech Republic Airplay (ČNS IFPI)	47
European Hot 100 (Billboard)	10
Hungary (Editors' Choice Top 40)	19
Ireland (IRMA)	12
Scottish Singles Sales (Official Charts)	5
Slovakia Airplay (ČNS IFPI)	26
Turkey (Turkey Top 20 Chart)	7
UK Singles (Official Charts)	3
UK Airplay (Music Week)	1

=== Year-end charts ===
Chart (2008)	Position
UK Singles (Official Charts Company)	66

== Certifications ==
Region	Certification	Certified units/sales
United Kingdom (BPI)	Silver	200,000^{*}
^{*} Sales figures based on certification alone.
