= Chef Menteur (band) =

American instrumental rock band

Chef Menteur is an instrumental rock band from New Orleans, Louisiana in the United States with heavy leanings towards the style of ambient music and psychedelic rock. It was formed in 1998 by Alec Vance (of Shinola) and Jim Yonkus, both of whom were looking to explore new sounds from different music worlds: electronica, post-rock, experimental noise and drone, and improvisational jazz. Since 2005, it has included Dan Haugh from the bands godheadSilo and Smoke and Smoke.

The original lineup was Vance on guitar and Farfisa organ and Yonkus on bass, with both members of the duo also playing other synths, manipulating samples and drum machines. They also ran their own custom video projections at live shows from self-produced DV footage. The sound of the band has become gradually more guitar-and-drums oriented over time and less sample-based and reliant on computer-synchronized beats, and shows feature psychedelic improvisations.

The band regularly appeared at the Mermaid Lounge music club, which shut down in 2004. Their 2005 album We Await Silent Tristero's Empire was released by the artist-run independent label Backporch Revolution to international critical acclaim including The Wire (UK) magazine.

The band reformed in New Orleans after Hurricane Katrina, and was one of the first bands to play in the city following the lifting of the evacuation order allowing residents to return. They were instrumental in releasing the Proud To Swim Home compilation which raised money for musicians who lost instruments in the flood.

They released the album The Answer's In Forgetting in 2007, which featured new member Brian Abbott, who replaced Yonkus. In 2008 the band was nominated for Best Electronic Act in The Best of the Big Easy Awards. The trio of Vance, Haugh, and Abbott spent the next several years making their next album named East of the Sun & West of the Moon.

In April 2011, Phil Rollins of The Gubernatorial Candidates became a member of Chef Menteur while the new record went into final mixes and production. East of the Sun & West of the Moon was released on Backporch Revolution on March 31, 2012, in double LP and digital formats. This album was funded via Kickstarter. Rollins contributed to their 2014 album Force Majeure, after which B. Aubrey Freeman replaced Abbott on bass guitar. In 2015, III was released, a 3-disc compilation consisting of East of the Sun & West of the Moon, North Tomorrow & South Of Yesterday (unreleased recordings from the same sessions as the previous), and Force Majeure. In 2017, Court Batson took over on bass.

Chef Menteur counts among its fans noted actress Grace Zabriskie.

== Band members ==
As of January 2024, the band is still active recording and is again performing live. The current full-time membership of Chef Menteur consists of:

- Court Batson (bass)
- Philip Cooper (keyboards)
- Dan Haugh (drums, additional instruments)
- Alec Vance (guitar, keyboards, vocals)

Other past and contributing members of the band have included Jim Yonkus (bass), Brian Abbott (bass, guitar, keyboards, trumpet), B. Aubrey Freeman (bass), Bryan Killingsworth (keyboards, sampling, programming, guitar), Phil Rollins (guitar, keyboards), Chris Sule (drums), Mike Mayfield (drums, keyboards; also known for his work in Electrical Spectacle and the Buttons), retro-minimalist musician potpie.

== Discography ==
- Vive La France! (CD-EP) - released 2003 on Backporch Revolution
- We Await Silent Tristero's Empire (CD) - released 2005 on Backporch Revolution
- The Answer's In Forgetting (CD) - released 2007 on Backporch Revolution
- East of the Sun & West of the Moon (double LP) - released March 31, 2012 on Backporch Revolution
- North of Tomorrow & South of Yesterday - digital album released March 31, 2012 on Backporch Revolution, available as reward for Kickstarter backers of East of the Sun & West of the Moon
- Force Majeure - digital album released June 14, 2014 on Backporch Revolution and on cassette only on Waypoint Tapes
- III (3-disc compilation including 3 previous albums: East of the Sun & West of the Moon, North of Tomorrow & South of Yesterday, and a remastered Force Majeure) - released March 25, 2015 on Sunrise Ocean Bender

=== Compilation appearances ===
- "Empires Sans Frontières" - track contributed to WTUL's Songs from the Basement 2 compilation, 2003
- "Oceanic No. 23" (with Alexandra Scott) - track contributed to WTUL's Songs from the Basement 4 compilation, 2006
- "Aquavitae" and "Charlie Don't Surf (DJ Pinkysqueak Mix)" - tracks contributed to Proud To Swim Home: A Backporch Revolution Compilation for New Orleans, 2006
- "Terpsichore" - track contributed to The Active Listener Sampler 31 compilation, 2015
