= Studio B =

Studio B may refer to:

- "Studio B with Shepard Smith", also known as Bill Hemmer Reports
- Studio B (group), a British electronic music trio
- Studio B Productions, an animation studio in Vancouver, BC
- RCA Studio B, a recording studio in Nashville
- RTV Studio B, a broadcasting company in Belgrade, Serbia
- A television studio where American Bandstand was filmed from 1957-1964
