= It's Gonna Rain (disambiguation) =

It's Gonna Rain is a composition by Steve Reich

It's Gonna Rain may also refer to:

- "It's Gonna Rain", a 1965 song by Sonny and Cher from Look at Us
- "It's Gonna Rain", a 1970 song by Bobby Womack from My Prescription
- "It's Gonna Rain", a 1984 song and single by Violent Femmes from Hallowed Ground
- "It's Gonna Rain!", Japanese song by Bonnie Pink
- "It's Gonna Rain", a song by Take 6 first released on their 1994 album, Join the Band
