= How I Miss You Baby =

Single by Bobby Womack

from the album My Prescription
- B-side: "Tried and Convicted"
- Released: 1969
- Genre: R&B
- Length: 3:19
- Label: Minit
- Songwriter(s): Bobby Womack, Darryl Carter

Bobby Womack singles chronology
"It's Gonna Rain" (1969)	"How I Miss You Baby" (1969)	"More Than I Can Stand" (1970)

"How I Miss You Baby" is a song written by Bobby Womack and Darryl Carter. It was released as a single in 1969 and included on Womack's 1970 album My Prescription.

== Background ==
The song's lyrics detail Womack's misery because his true love left him "a week ago."

== Chart performance ==
"How I Miss You Baby" returned Womack to the top 20 of Billboard's R&B chart at #14 and became a minor success on the Billboard Hot 100 (#93).

Chart (1969)	Peak position
US Billboard Hot 100	93
US Billboard Best Selling Soul Singles	14
