= Denial (Sugababes song) =

2008 single by Sugababes

Single by Sugababes

from the album Change
- B-side: "Hey There Delilah"
- Released: 10 March 2008
- Genre: Pop rock; disco
- Length: 3:29
- Label: Island
- Songwriters: Heidi Range; Keisha Buchanan; Amelle Berrabah; Flex Turner; Elliot Malloy; Vanessa Brown
- Producers: Flex Turner; Elliot Malloy

Sugababes singles chronology
"Change" (2007)	"Denial" (2008)	"She's like a Star" (2008)

Music video
- "Denial" on YouTube

"Denial" is a song by English girl group Sugababes from their fifth studio album, Change (2007). Coinciding with the commencement of the group's 2008 Change Tour, it was released on 10 March 2008 as the album's third and final single. V V Brown wrote "Denial" for the band while she was on London Underground's Victoria line, and attempted to "get into their mindsets" in the process. The Sugababes and the song's producers, Flex Turner and Elliot Malloy, co-wrote it. Composed of staccato verses, a harmonious chorus and a solo middle eight, "Denial" is a pop rock and disco song that samples "Standing in the Way of Control" by the Gossip.

The song received mixed reviews from critics, who were ambivalent towards its composition, but became a commercial success throughout Europe, where it peaked at number one on the Czech Singles Chart, number four on the Austrian Singles Chart, and within the top twenty on the charts in Germany, Hungary, Ireland, and Switzerland. It reached number 15 on the UK Singles Chart. Harvey B-Brown directed the song's music video, which was inspired by Vogue and contains fashion editorial characteristics. The Sugababes performed "Denial" on Ant & Dec's Saturday Night Takeaway, at the 2008 Oxegen Festival, and during their Change Tour.

== Development and release ==
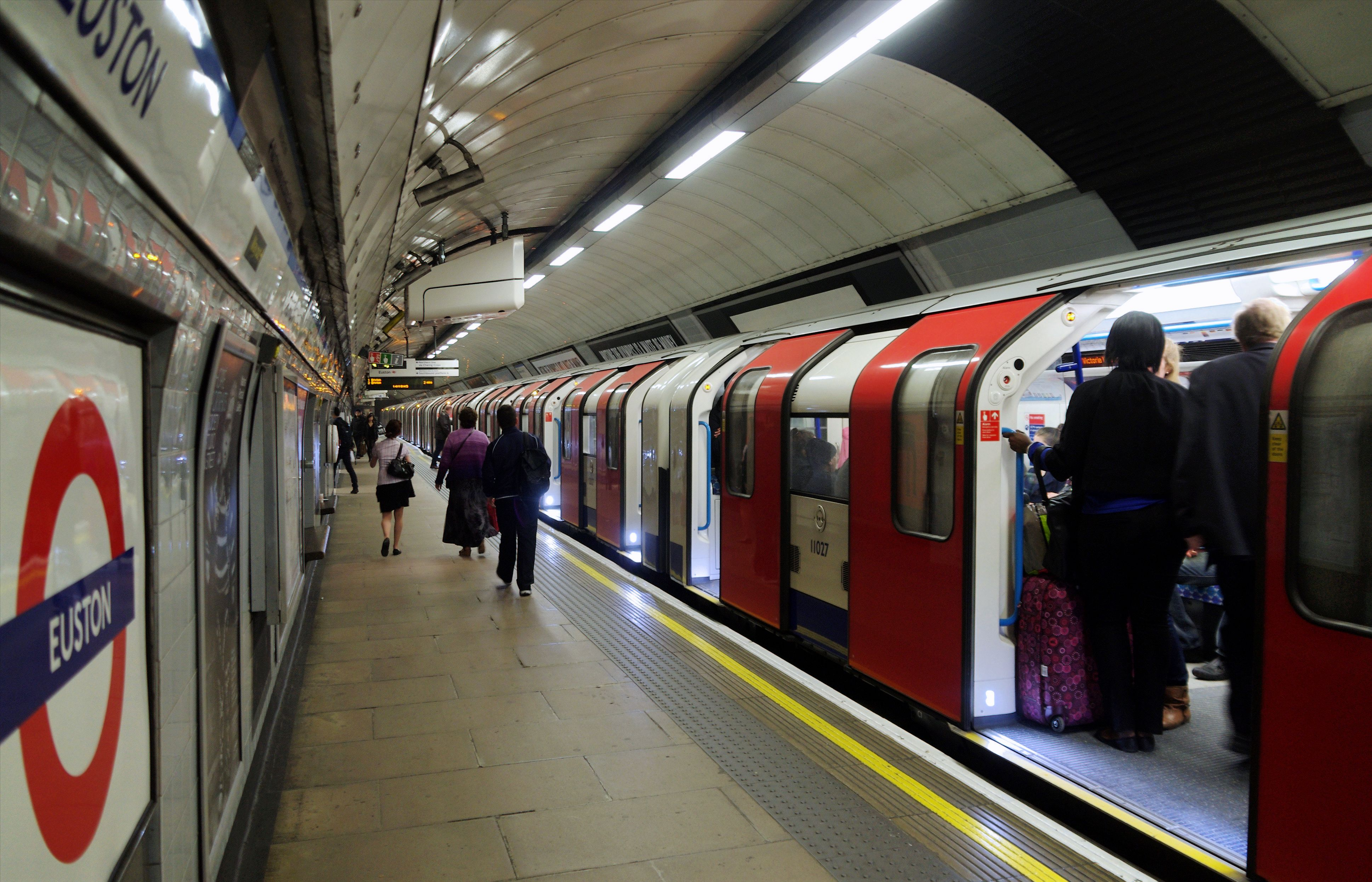
V V Brown composed the song while on London Underground's Victoria line.

English singer and songwriter V V Brown wrote "Denial" while she was on London Underground's Victoria line. Brown told Metro that songs she writes for enjoyment come spontaneously to her. She composed "Denial" specifically for the Sugababes, and attempted to "get into their mindsets" in the process. The song was submitted to the group and received by their management; the band enjoyed the song and subsequently recorded it for their fifth studio album Change. Brown described its transferral to the band as "validation that I'd truly found who I am in both territories as a song writer, as a producer, as a writer and as an artist".

The Sugababes and the song's producers and programmers, Flex Turner and Elliot Malloy, received co-writing credits on the song. "Denial" was mixed by Jeremy Wheatley at Twenty One Studios, London, with assistance from Richard Edgeler. The song's instruments were provided by Pete Boxsta Martin and Wheatley. When Metro questioned Brown about her feelings towards the group's ownership of the song, she responded: "When you write songs for other people you’ve got to let it go, it becomes their property, they have to interpret it in the way they feel. You can’t be too precious about it otherwise you wouldn’t have given it away in the first place."

"Denial" was confirmed for release in January 2008 as the fourth and final single from Change, and the Sugababes' 21st single overall. Island Records released "Denial" as a digital download in the United Kingdom on 10 March 2008. The CD single was made available on 17 March 2008. Its release coincided with the commencement of the group's Change Tour, which began on 13 March 2008 in Brentwood, Essex. "Denial" was released as a CD single in Germany on 25 April 2008. In October 2007, the Sugababes performed a cover version of "Hey There Delilah" by the Plain White T's on BBC Radio 1's Live Lounge as the B-side to "Denial". "Denial" was remixed by American disc jockey Ian Carey.

== Composition ==
"Denial" is a midtempo pop rock and disco song. Its instrumentation is provided by a guitar, a keyboard, drums and synthesizers. The song contains a sample of the bass hook from "Standing in the Way of Control" by The Gossip. "Denial" is composed of soft rock staccato verses, which are proceeded by a melancholic and harmonious pop chorus. Digital Spy's Nick Levine commented upon the song's compositional transition, writing: "'Denial' rides its elastic bassline to a transcendent, melodically-inspired chorus". The group's harmonies are backed by warm synthesizers and 1980s soft rock music. The song contains a solo middle eight performed by group member Heidi Range, and is opened with the line "I see the way the wind blows like open minds for us". "Denial" explores themes of unrequited love, as noted by Peter Murphy from Hot Press.

== Reception ==
=== Critical response ===
Alexis Petridis of The Guardian classified "Denial" as a "beautifully-crafted bulletproof pop song", while Manchester Evening News' Sarah Walters described the track as "a steamy, disco hit". Levine from Digital Spy rated the song four out of five stars; he regarded it as "brilliantly addictive", and "bouncier than a Labrador puppy on Ritalin, but classy too". Birmingham Mail critic Sean Coleman commended the Sugababes' emotion and harmonious vocal performance on the song, which he considered the standout from Change. Fraser McAlpine of BBC gave "Denial" a full five-star rating, and highlighted the Sugababes' vocal performance accompanied by the "raw, brittle emotion" in the song. The BBC's ChartBlog team listed the song on their "2008's finest five" list, describing the chorus as "the cherry on the cake". Andreas Borcholte from German news magazine Der Spiegel positively highlighted it in comparison to the album's filler tracks.

The song also received negative responses. A journalist from the Stornoway Gazette called it "disposable" despite the "undeniably lovely" harmonies, and stated that the song would have no impact on the quality of Change if it did not appear on the album. Tom Young of BBC wrote that the track "stumbles awkwardly" owing to the sample of "Standing in the Way of Control". A writer from The Scotsman criticised it as substandard, noting its "clunking sexual imagery" and "bewildering observation" in the middle eight. Entertainment Ireland critic Lauren Murphy dismissed the song as "garden-variety pop" and wrote that it suggests the Sugababes "may be losing their magic touch".

=== Commercial performance ===
"Denial" debuted on the UK Singles Chart on 8 March 2008 at number 64, based on digital downloads from Change. The song rose from number 34 to number 15 in the issue dated 22 March 2008 with sales of 9,580 copies. It held this position for two consecutive weeks, while overall it charted for 11 weeks. By April 2010, the single had sold approximately 90,000 copies in the UK, placing it 16th on the group's list of best-selling songs. The song had similar success on the Irish Singles Chart, where it debuted at number 50 and peaked at number 18 in the issue dated 20 March 2008. The single spent ten weeks on the chart. "Denial" performed best on the Czech Singles Chart, where it first appeared at number 92, and, eighteen weeks after its debut, peaked at number one for two consecutive weeks. Overall, the single spent 62 non-consecutive weeks in the chart.

"Denial" entered the Austrian Singles Chart on 9 May 2008 at number seven, and reached number four two weeks later. It appeared in the chart for 21 weeks, and was placed 43rd on Austria's list of best-performing singles of 2008. "Denial" became the Sugababes' highest-charting non-lead single on the German Singles Chart, where it peaked at number 11. The song debuted at number 71 on the Swiss Singles Chart in the issue dated 6 April 2008 and reached number 14 three weeks later. Overall, it spent 23 weeks on the chart. "Denial" peaked at number 20 on the Hungarian Singles Chart and ranked 47th on its 2008 list of best-performing songs. The song peaked at number 21 on Slovak Singles Chart, for two non-consecutive weeks. "Denial" charted at number 40 on the Danish Singles Chart, while on the Netherlands' Mega Single Top 100 chart it reached number 61.

== Music video ==
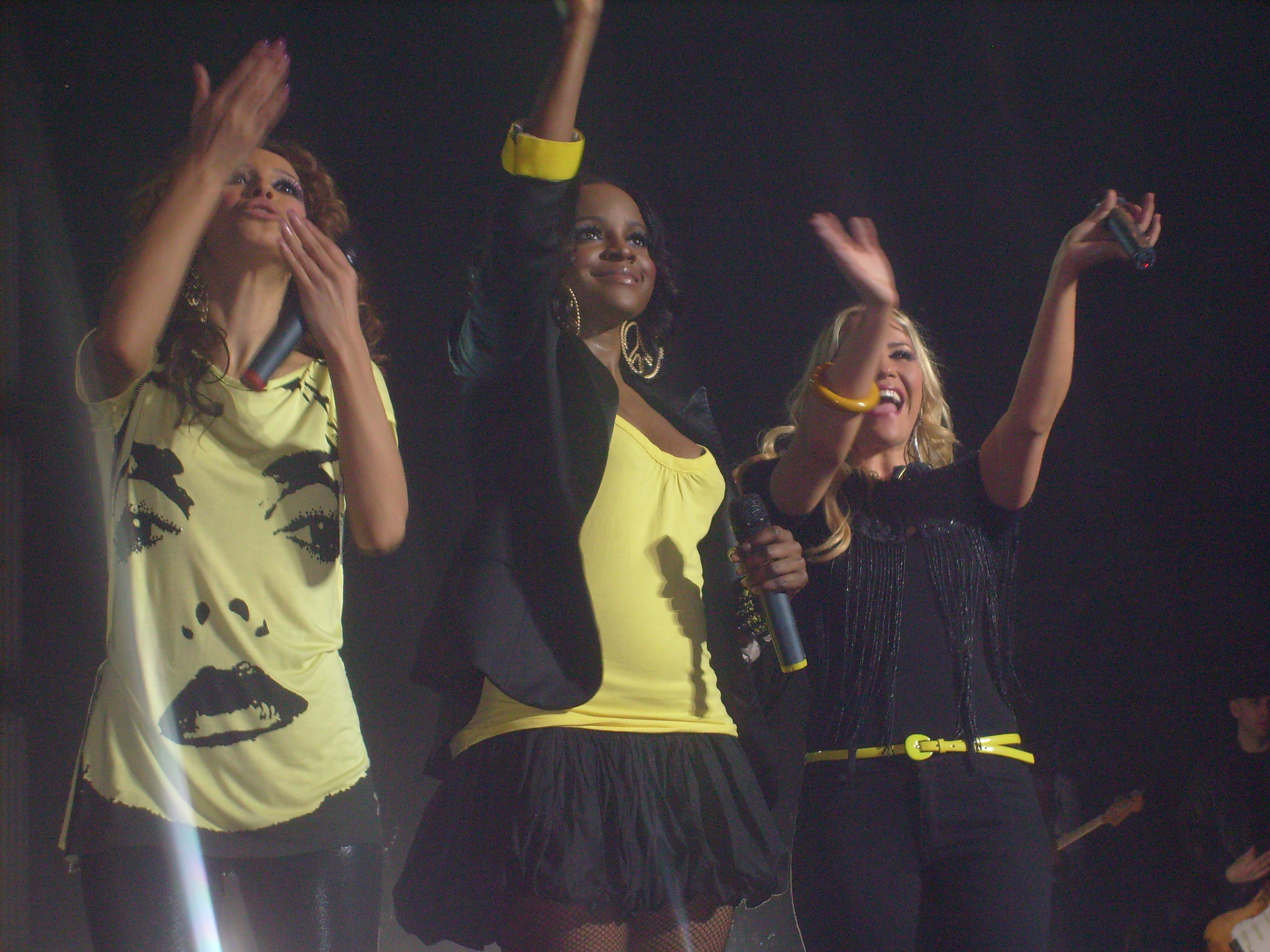
The Sugababes' performing during their Change Tour in 2008.

The music video for "Denial" was directed by Harvey B-Brown. It was his first solo video project, following the discontinuation of his 18-year partnership with Carolyn Corben. The video was produced by Francesca Barnes, while Tom Gander served as the art director. It was shot in various formats, including 16 mm film, Bolex, Super 8 film and three still cameras. Aman King, a smoke artist from Golden Square, collaborated with Brown to devise treatments of the stills. Multiple film effects were used in the video, including colour correction, vignetting and film grain, with the intention of creating visuals inspired by Vogue. The video was filmed on 3 December 2007 and it premiered on the Sugababes' official website on 7 January 2008.

Brown stated that he wanted to "redefine" the group and conceptualise a new image that would represent his perception of their personas. He described the band as "extremely style-savvy" and motivated them to be bold, uninhibited and experimental. The video takes influences from styles of fashion editorial and features the Sugababes in various costumes and guises. Their outfits were created with many fabrics, in addition to newspapers, plastic bin bags and florist's cellophane. Overall, there were 13 costume changes. Scenes for the video were shot in a wide range of environments and locations, including a fire escape, loading bay, and storage cupboard.

"I shot the video like [a] fashion editorial, using every inch of the studio, including the fire escape, the gantry and the loading bay. I even did a couple of shots with the girls in the storage cupboard where the studio lighting stands were kept. And whilst I was shooting one outfit on one girl, I would be getting the next outfit and set ready."

— —Harvey B-Brown on the video's development.

Digital Arts called the video "a sumptuously over-the-top affair" and wrote that the effects created "luxuriant, opulent visuals that capture the buzz, attitude and posing of a high-fashion shoot". Coleman from the Birmingham Mail described it as "amazing". The video became one of the Sugababes' favourites to shoot, and inspired them to wear more daring and dramatic outfits on their Change Tour in 2008. According to London Evening Standard, the group managed to adopt a more sophisticated and mature style with the assistance from various stylists.

== Live performances ==
"Denial" was one of three songs from Change that the Sugababes performed at London's indig02 on 14 September 2007. The performance was part of a gig to promote the release of the album's lead single "About You Now". They performed "Denial" in March 2008 on the eighth season of the British television show Ant & Dec's Saturday Night Takeaway. The song was included on the set list for the group's 2008 Change Tour. Their performance at the Newcastle City Hall attracted a positive response from Kat Keogh of The Journal, who wrote that the song "slotted in neatly" amongst the group's more well-known songs. The Sugababes performed "Denial" at the 2008 Oxegen festival as part of a set list, which included their number-one singles such as "Freak like Me", "Round Round", "Hole in the Head" and "Push the Button", in addition to other tracks from Change. Midway through the gig, technical difficulties with their microphones arose and the trio were forced to delay their performance while the issue was fixed. The band performed "Denial" in July 2009 at the Riverside Cricket Ground, County Durham as part of a set list.

== Formats and track listings ==
- UK CD / European CD Maxi
1. "Denial" (Radio Edit) – 3:29
2. "Hey There Delilah" (Radio One Live Lounge) – 3:54
3. "Denial" (Ian Carey Vocal Mix) – 7:04
4. "Denial" (Sanna & Pitron Remix) – 8:25
- European CD Single
1. "Denial" (Radio Edit) – 3:29
2. "Hey There Delilah" (Radio One Live Lounge) – 3:54
- Digital download
1. "Denial" (Radio Edit) – 3:29
- Remix Bundle (EP)
1. "Denial" (Ian Carey Vocal Mix) – 7:04
2. "Denial" (Max Sanna & Steve Pitron Remix) – 8:25
- Remixes (EP)
1. "Denial" (Ian Carey Vocal Mix) – 7:04
2. "Denial" (Max Sanna & Steve Pitron Remix) – 8:25
3. "Denial" (Totally Enormous Extinct Dinosaurs – Microceratops Remax) – 4:06

== Credits and personnel ==
Credits are adapted from the liner notes of Change.

- Songwriter – Heidi Range, Keisha Buchanan, Amelle Berrabah, Flex Turner, Elliot Malloy, Vanessa Brown
- Production – Elliot Malloy, Flex Turner
- Programming – Elliot Malloy, Flex Turner
- Guitar – Flex Turner
- Keyboard and drum programming – Pete Boxsta Martin, Jeremy Wheatley
- Mixing – Jeremy Wheatley
- Mixing (assistant) – Richard Edgeler

== Charts ==
=== Weekly charts ===
Weekly chart performance for "Denial"
Chart (2008)	Peak position
Austria (Ö3 Austria Top 40)	4
Belgium (Ultratip Bubbling Under Flanders)	4
CIS Airplay (TopHit)	17
Czech Republic Airplay (ČNS IFPI)	1
Denmark (Tracklisten)	40
European Hot 100 (Billboard)	26
Germany (GfK)	11
Hungary (Rádiós Top 40)	20
Ireland (IRMA)	18
Netherlands (Single Top 100)	61
Poland (Airplay Chart)	3
Romania (Romanian Top 100)	55
Russia Airplay (TopHit)	34
Scottish Singles Sales (Official Charts)	8
Slovakia Airplay (ČNS IFPI)	21
Switzerland (Schweizer Hitparade)	14
UK Singles (Official Charts)	15
UK Airplay (Music Week)	11

=== Yearly charts ===
2008 year-end chart performance for "Denial"
Chart (2008)	Position
Austria (Ö3 Austria Top 40)	43
CIS (TopHit)	66
Germany (Media Control GfK)	74
Hungary (Rádiós Top 40)	47
Russia Airplay (TopHit)	62
Switzerland (Schweizer Hitparade)	70
UK Singles (OCC)	132

2009 year-end chart performance for "Denial"
Chart (2009)	Position
Hungary (Rádiós Top 40)	101
