= Mother-in-Law Lounge =

Coordinates: 29°58′15.4″N 90°4′0.4″W

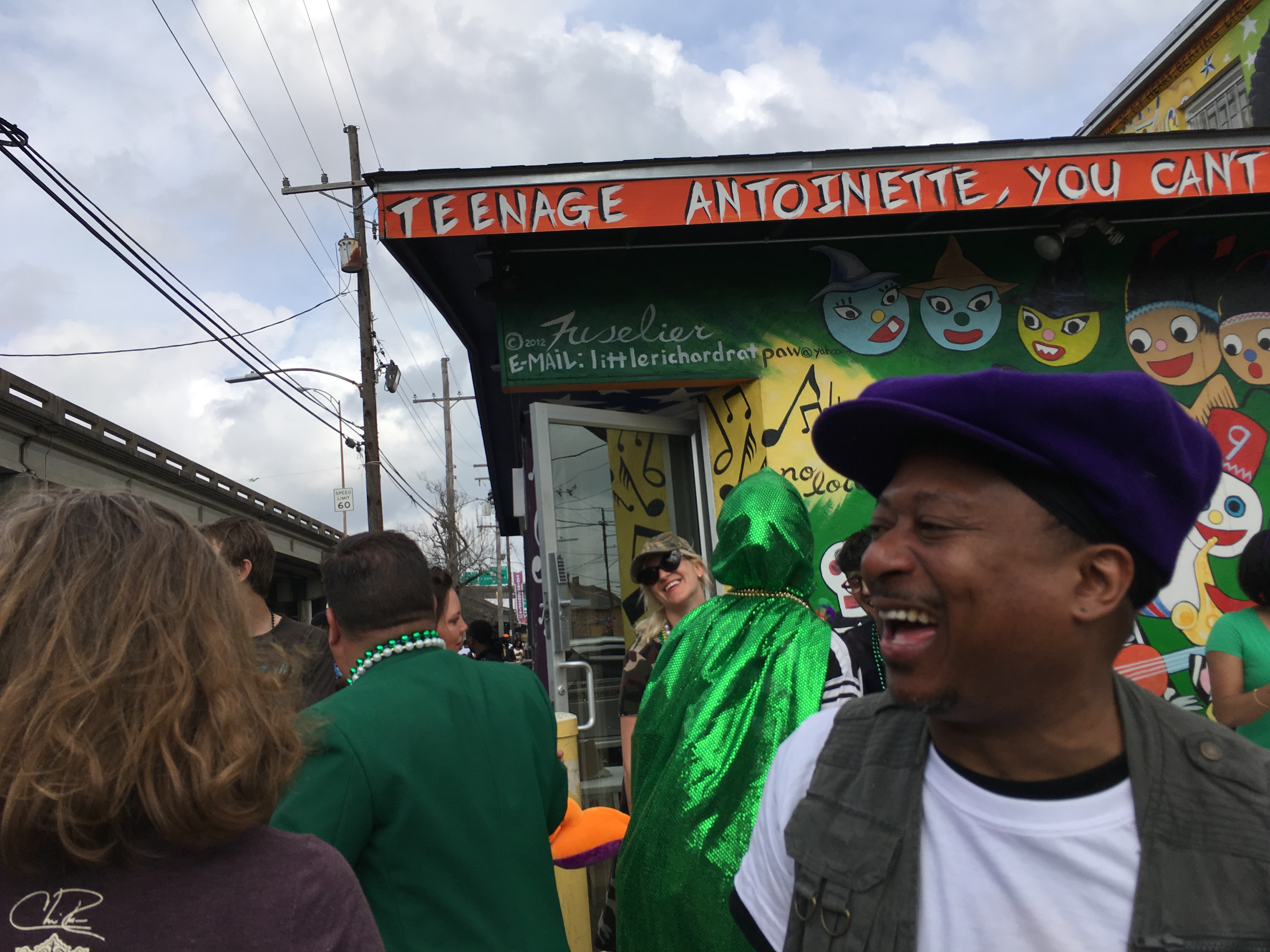
Kermit Ruffins (at right) outside the door of Mother-In-Law-Lounge, Mardi Gras Day 2017.

The Mother-in-Law Lounge is a live music venue, pub and a shrine in New Orleans, Louisiana dedicated to the memory of rhythm and blues singer, Ernie K-Doe. It is at the downtown river corner of Claiborne Avenue and Columbus Street in the 7th Ward of New Orleans. The exterior of the building is decorated with colorful murals depicting K-Doe and other prominent figures in New Orleans music, especially people who collaborated with K-Doe.

The lounge was originally opened by Ernie K-Doe in 1994, and it has become a historical icon in the local community. It was flooded with five and a half feet of water during Hurricane Katrina in 2005. With the help of the Hands on Network and Chet Haines, the lounge reopened its doors on 29 August 2006, on the first anniversary of Hurricane Katrina. Mother-in-Law Lounge was owned and operated by K-Doe's widow and musician, Antoinette K-Doe, before she died during Mardi Gras 2009.

In 2011, local musician Kermit Ruffins agreed to lease the site, and it reopened on January 20, 2014. Ruffins is now running the establishment as Kermit's Mother-In-Law Lounge.

In 2026, Kermit Ruffins announced "The days are coming to an end at the Mother-In-Law Lounge for me.... I’m ready to get out."
