= Fly Me to the Moon (Bobby Womack album) =

Studio album by Bobby Womack
- Released: January 1969
- Recorded: 1968
- Genre: R&B
- Length: 31:53
- Label: Minit
- Producer: Chips Moman

Bobby Womack chronology
Fly Me to the Moon (1969)	My Prescription (1970)

Professional ratings
Review scores
Source	Rating
The Encyclopedia of Popular Music	3/5 stars

Fly Me to the Moon is the debut studio album by American singer-songwriter Bobby Womack. The album was released in January 1969, by Minit Records.

== Track listing ==
All tracks are written by Bobby Womack, except where indicated.

No.	Title	Writer(s)	Length
1.	"Fly Me to the Moon (In Other Words)"	Bart Howard	2:08
2.	"Baby! You Oughta Think It Over"	Womack; Jimmy Holiday	2:37
3.	"I'm a Midnight Mover"	Womack; Wilson Pickett	2:02
4.	"What Is This"		2:32
5.	"Somebody Special"		2:55
6.	"Take Me"	Dee Ervin	2:30
7.	"Moonlight in Vermont"	John Blackburn; Karl Suessdorf	2:35
8.	"Love, the Time is Now"	Womack; Holiday	3:18
9.	"I'm in Love"		2:42
10.	"California Dreamin'"	John Phillips; Michelle Phillips	3:20
11.	"No Money in My Pocket"	Womack; Holiday	3:00
12.	"Lillie Mae"	Don Juan Mancha; Vee Pea	2:06

== Personnel ==
- Bobby Womack - guitar, vocals
- Reggie Young - guitar
- Mike Leech - bass
- Bobby Wood - piano
- Bobby Emmons - organ
- Gene Chrisman - drums
- Bobby Womack, Mike Leech - arrangements
