= Change (Sugababes song) =

2007 single by Sugababes

Single by Sugababes

from the album Change
- B-side: "I Can't Take It No More"
- Released: 10 December 2007
- Studio: Electric Lady (New York City)
- Genre: Pop rock
- Length: 3:37
- Label: Island
- Songwriters: Lars Halvor Jensen; Martin Michael Larsson; Niara Scarlett; Heidi Range; Keisha Buchanan; Amelle Berrabah
- Producer: Deekay

Sugababes singles chronology
"About You Now" (2007)	"Change" (2007)	"Denial" (2008)

Music video
- "Change" on YouTube

"Change" is a song by English girl group Sugababes from their fifth studio album, Change (2007). It was written by the Sugababes, Niara Scarlett and its producers, the Danish production duo Deekay. The song was released as the album's second international and third overall single on 10 December 2007 with an accompanying B-side titled "I Can't Take It No More". "Change" is a midtempo pop rock ballad composed of anthemic harmonies, guitars, keys and sweeping effects.

The song received mixed reviews from critics, who were divided on the song's composition and balladry. It was considered a contender for the UK Singles Chart Christmas number one but only managed to peak at number 13. The single reached the top forty on the charts in Germany, Ireland, the Netherlands and Romania. Fatima Robinson directed the song's music video, which depicts the Sugababes as the four seasons of the year. The band performed the single during an acoustic gig as part of Radio Clyde's Up Close series, and on The Paul O'Grady Show. "Change" was included in the set list for the group's 2008 tour of the same name.

== Development and composition ==
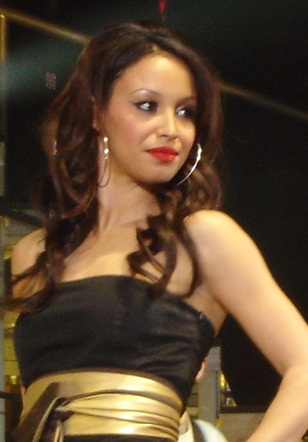
Amelle Berrabah sings on "Change".

"Change" was co-written and produced by the Danish production duo Deekay, composed of Lars Halvor Jensen and Martin Michael Larsson. Deekay wrote the song in collaboration with the Sugababes, consisting of Heidi Range, Keisha Buchanan and Amelle Berrabah. British singer and songwriter Niara Scarlett also co-wrote the song. It is the title track of the group's fifth studio album, which is the first to feature Berrabah, following the departure of Mutya Buena in December 2005. The group's vocals on "Change" were recorded at the Electric Lady Studios in New York City. Deekay arranged and programmed the song, and provided its instrumentation. It was mixed by Larsson at the duo's studio in Copenhagen, Denmark. DJ Swivel engineered the song.

"Change" is a steady, midtempo pop rock ballad. Alex Fletcher from Digital Spy described the song as "a gentle, sweeping lament". According to the digital sheet music published by Universal Music Publishing, "Change" was composed in the key of D minor using common time. The tempo of the song moves at 85 beats per minute. A soulful track, it follows the group's conventional style of balladry, although is more uptempo than their other ballads. Group member Berrabah sings the lead vocals on the song. It contains anthemic melodies backed by a powerful 1980s guitar lick, and incorporates the group's harmonies into keys and sweeping effects. The song's lyrics are about the experiences of change after the departure of a close friend and ultimately never being the same again, but the need to remain strong in the process. The song samples "Time Lapse" from the Apple iLife for Mac royalty free samples.

== Release and reception ==
"Change" served as the second single from the album of the same name; its release was confirmed in October 2007. The song was made available in the United Kingdom as a digital download on 10 December, while the CD single was made available a week later on 17 December 2007. "Change" was also released as a CD single in Germany on 8 February 2008. The single's accompanying B-side is titled "I Can't Take It No More", and was composed by the Sugababes, Jeremy Shaw and Jony Rockstar.

=== Critical response ===
The song received mixed reviews from critics. Sunday Mail critic Mickey McMonagle called "Change" the album's best track and "a definite chart topper". Alex Fletcher from Digital Spy and the BBC Chart Blog's Fraser McAlphine rated the song four out of five stars; the former regarded it as a "sophisticated pop ballad" and highlighted the Sugababes' vocal abilities, while the latter described the chorus as "anthemic". According to Dave Kelly of the Birmingham Mail, "Change" allows the Sugababes "to show that they have matured without surrendering their pop smarts". In contrast, a writer from The Scotsman considered it "vapid", while a critic for Manchester Evening News felt that the group's vocals were average. Yahoo! Music's Emily Mackay criticised the song as "a limper retread" of the group's 2002 single "Stronger". Tom Young of BBC Music wrote that "Change" "only flirts with credibility" due to the group's "irrepressible and watertight harmonies". Writing for The Independent, Andy Gill regarded it as "colourless".

=== Commercial performance ===
"Change" failed to duplicate the success of its predecessor "About You Now". It entered the Irish Singles Chart in the issue dated 13 December 2007 at number 47, and peaked at number 21 the following week. The single debuted on the UK Singles Chart on 1 December 2007 at number 85, based on digital downloads from the album. It was considered a contender for the chart's 2007 Christmas number one, but only managed to reach number 13 in the issue dated 29 December 2007. Consequently, it marked the first time since 2000 where the second single from their album failed to reach the top ten. "Change" spent 14 weeks on the chart, and had sold 95,000 copies in the UK by April 2010, making it their 15th highest-selling single in the country. "Change" peaked at number 31 on the Netherlands' Dutch Top 40 chart, number 32 on the German Singles Chart, and number 36 on the Romanian Top 100 chart. The song debuted on the Slovak Singles Chart at number 69, and reached number 15 nine weeks later. In total, it spent 16 weeks on the chart. The single appeared on the European Hot 100 Singles chart at number 45.

== Promotion ==
=== Music video ===
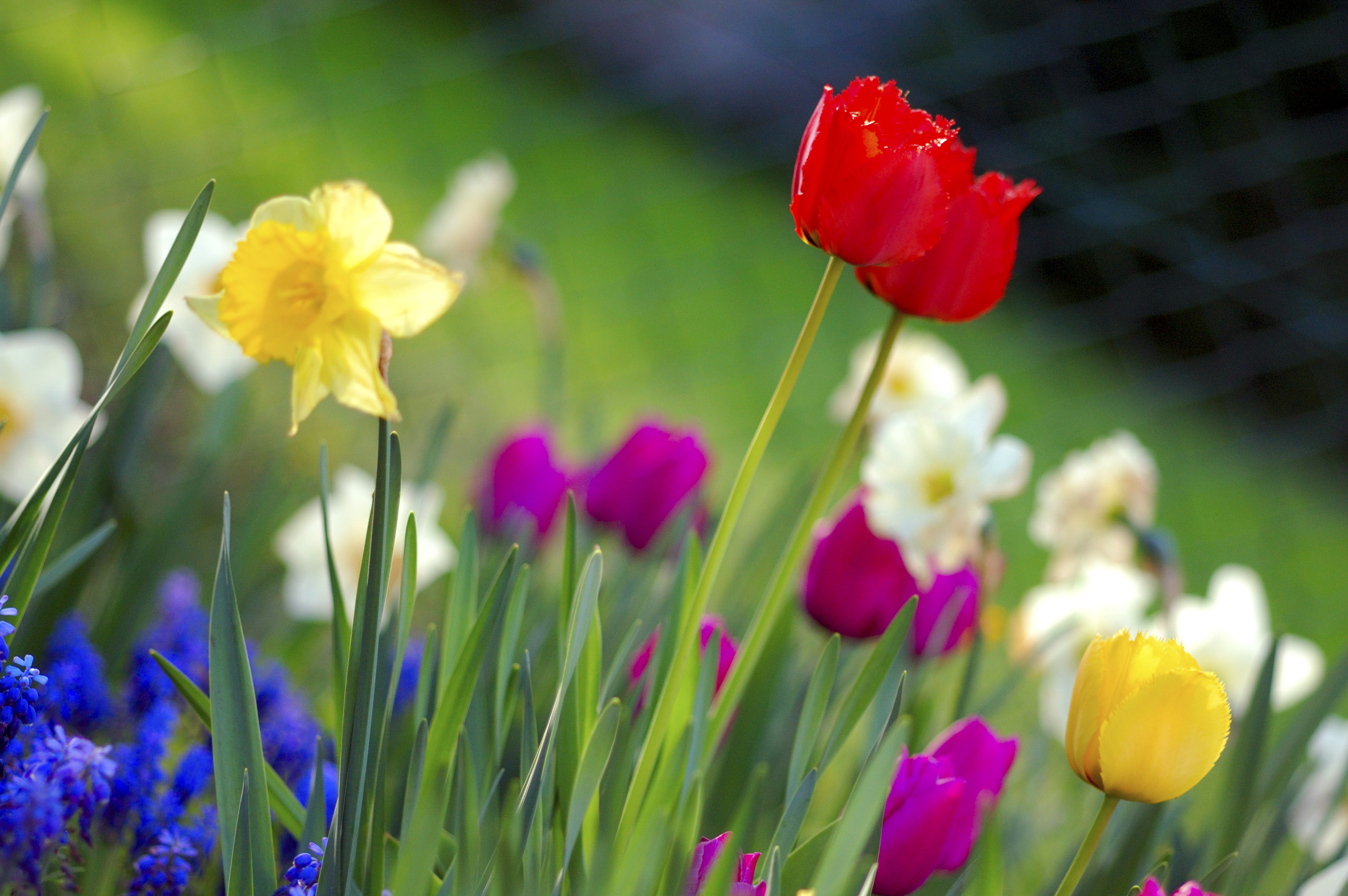
The Sugababes represent the four seasons of the year in the song's music video.

The music video for "Change" was directed by Fatima Robinson. Pictures from the set of the shoot were revealed in November 2007, and the video made its premiere on 16 November 2007 on Channel 4. The concept focusses on the Sugababes represented as the four seasons of the year. It opens with a scene of Buchanan, who depicts the season of spring. She is featured with blue decoration in her hair and pink flowers around her eyes. It then cuts to Berrabah, who is shown with long eyelashes and large red and yellow blooms in her hair, to represent summer.

The Sugababes are shown standing together in the next scene, where they are presented in a dark environment and covered in glitter. Range is represented as the season of autumn. The subsequent clip depicts Berrabah in a winter environment. The group is shown together for a second time, although in a natural environment. The next scenes depict Buchanan in the centre of a large purple flower, and leaves blowing past Range. Towards the end of the video, the Sugababes are shown in the same dark and natural environments and eventually in their solo settings, before concluding with a shot of them in their natural environment behind a waterfall. Mickey McMonagle from the Sunday Mail praised the group's seasonal outfits in the video.

=== Live performances ===
To promote the release of "Change", the Sugababes performed the single during an acoustic gig on 12 December 2007 in Scotland, as part of Radio Clyde's Up Close series. They were supported by three musicians and played in front of 250 people. The group performed the song on The Paul O'Grady Show the following day, and on BBC Switch's entertainment programme Sound on 15 December 2007. "Change" was included in the set list for the Sugababes' 2008 tour of the same name. During the performances, they wore kimono-like robes which were covered in petals and autumn leaves. The band also released petals into the crowd.

== Track listings and formats ==
- UK CD1 / European CD Single
1. "Change" (Radio Edit) – 3:19
2. "Change" (Wideboys Remix) – 6:41
- Digital Download
1. "Change" – 3:37
2. "I Can't Take It No More" – 4:02
- UK CD2 / International CD Maxi
1. "Change" – 3:40
2. "Change" (Wideboys Remix) – 6:41
3. "I Can't Take It No More" – 4:02
4. "About You Now" (Radio One Live Lounge) – 2:48
- UK USB Stick
1. "Change" – 3:40
2. "Change" (Wideboys Remix Edit) – 3:21
3. "Change" (Vito Benito Remix) – 3:33
4. "About You Now" (Radio One Live Lounge) – 2:48

== Credits and personnel ==
Credits are taken from the liner notes of Change.

Recording

- Vocals recorded at Electric Lady Studios, New York City, by Johannes Joergensen

Personnel

- Songwriting – Lars Halvor Jensen, Martin Michael Larsson, Niara Scarlett, Heidi Range, Keisha Buchanan, Amelle Berrabah
- Production – DEEKAY
- Arrangement – DEEKAY
- Programming – Martin M. Larsson
- Instrumentation – Martin M. Larrson, Lars H Jensen
- Guitars – Josh
- Additional percussion – Tim McEwan, Dicky Daniel Klein
- Vocal production – Lars H Jensen
- Mixing – Martin M. Larsson at DEEKAY Studios, Copenhagen, Denmark
- Engineering – Jordan *DJ Swivel* Young
- Vocals – Sugababes

== Charts ==
Weekly chart performance for "Change"
Chart (2007–2008)	Peak position
European Hot 100 (Billboard)	45
Germany (GfK)	32
Ireland (IRMA)	21
Netherlands (Dutch Top 40)	31
Netherlands (Single Top 100)	64
Romania (Romanian Top 100)	36
Scottish Singles Sales (Official Charts)	11
Slovakia Airplay (ČNS IFPI)	15
UK Singles (Official Charts)	13
UK Airplay (Music Week)	3
UK Hip Hop/R&B (Official Charts)	4
