= WTUL =

Coordinates: 29.939°N 90.119°W

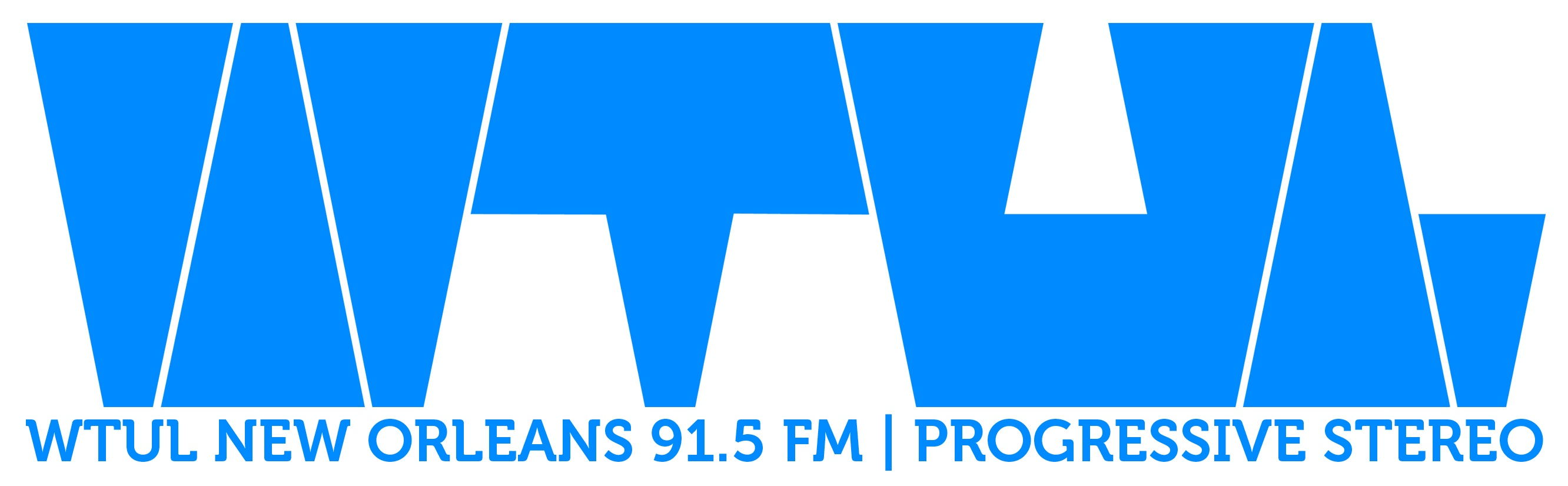
- New Orleans, Louisiana; United States
- Broadcast area: New Orleans
- Frequency: 91.5 (MHz)
- Branding: "WTUL NEW ORLEANS”

Programming
- Format: Progressive music

Ownership
- Owner: Tulane University

History
- First air date: March 14, 1959
- Call sign meaning: TULane University

Technical information
- Licensing authority: FCC
- Facility ID: 68321
- Class: A
- ERP: 1,500 watts
- HAAT: 49 meters (161 ft)

Links
- Public license information: Public file; LMS
- Webcast: https://stream.wtulneworleans.com
- Website: http://www.wtulneworleans.org

WTUL is a progressive/alternative FM radio outlet in New Orleans, Louisiana, United States, operating at 91.5 MHz with an ERP of 1,500 watts. The transmitter is located on the campus of Tulane University.

The station, which is owned by Tulane University, offers a mix of cutting-edge, progressive, alternative, electronica, classical, New Age, straight ahead jazz, folk, blues Latin, world reggae, show tunes, kids' show, and an eclectic mix of a variety of genres. The station runs 24 hours. Tulane University students, and New Orleans local affiliates run the non-profit station.

== History ==
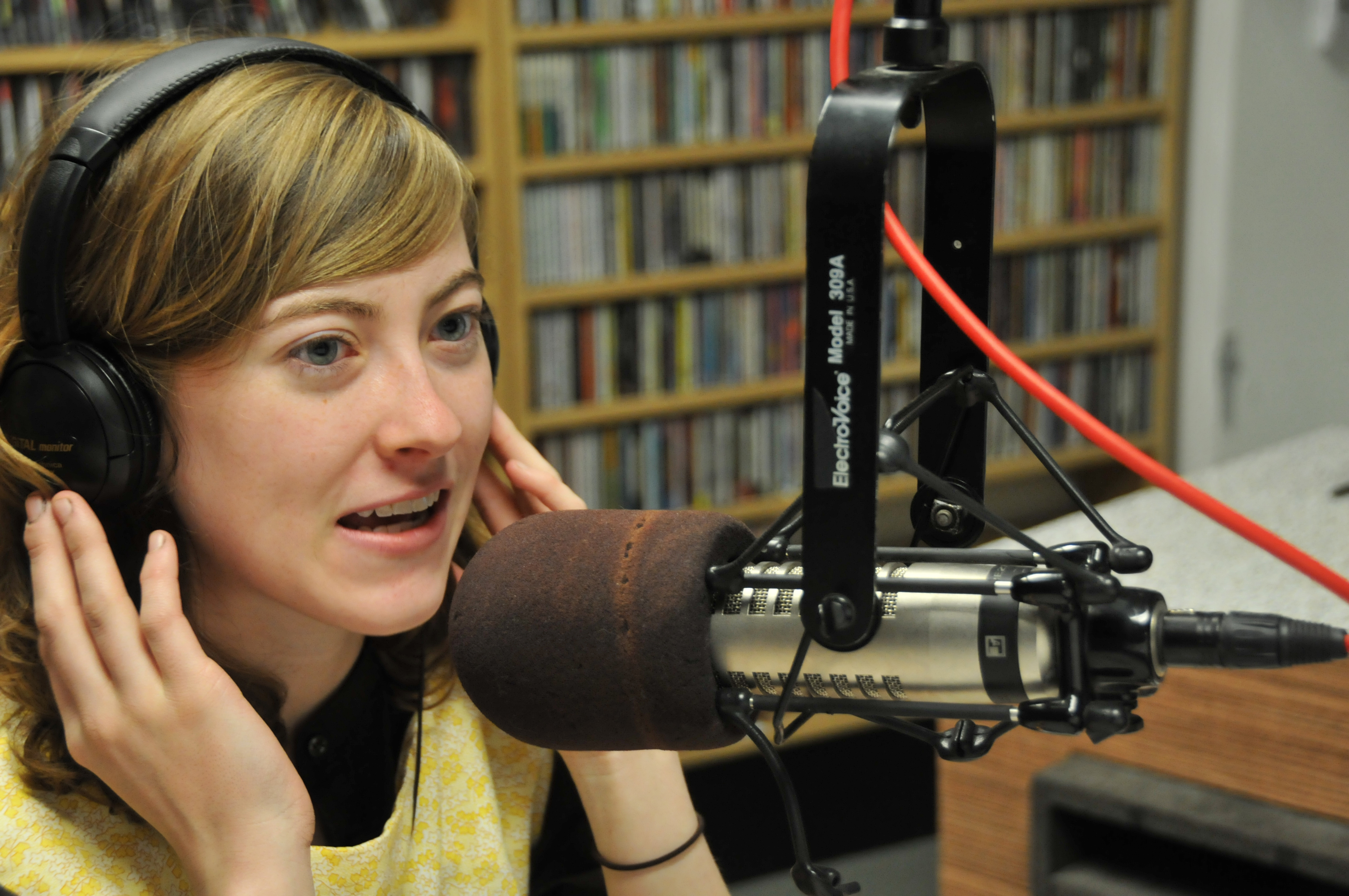
Radio station WTUL studio, Tulane University, New Orleans

WTUL was established on March 14, 1959. It is the station which gave future mayor-turned TV news anchor-turned talk show host Jerry Springer his start. The yearly "Rock On Survival Marathon" fund raisers featuring live bands on the Tulane campus are a locally famous event. In spite of the low wattage, WTUL was occasionally picked up as far away as New York City in its early years due to the limited number of stations operating on the FM band.

"Mother-in-Law" singer Ernie K-Doe was a DJ at WTUL for many years.

WTUL went off the air on August 28, 2005, as Hurricane Katrina approached the New Orleans area. The Tulane campus building which housed the station (itself a temporary location due to the renovation of the University Center) was damaged by the resulting flood waters. On December 15, 2005, the station began broadcasting again, using donated studio space on the mezzanine of the Rue de la Course coffeehouse in the Carrollton neighborhood of uptown New Orleans, about 10 blocks from the Tulane campus. The station kept its Internet broadcast running via donated bandwidth from CCRMA at Stanford University.

The station continued a limited broadcast until it moved to Uptown Square at the corner of Broadway Street and Leake Avenue. It now broadcasts on a normal 24-hour schedule from a new studio in the basement of the Lavin-Bernick Center for University Life on the Tulane campus. WTUL is volunteer-run, accepting DJs from across the Tulane and New Orleans community.

WTUL releases an edition of its compilation CD Songs from the Basement, featuring local, national and international artists, to coincide with its annual Marathon, WTUL's main fundraiser.

== See also ==
- Campus radio
- List of college radio stations in the United States
