= My Love Is Pink =

Promotional single by Sugababes

from the album Change
- Released: 10 December 2007
- Genre: Dance-pop; electropop
- Length: 3:44
- Label: Island
- Songwriters: Keisha Buchanan; Heidi Range; Miranda Cooper; Brian Higgins; Tim Powell; Lisa Cowling; Nick Coler
- Producers: Brian Higgins; Xenomania

Audio video
- "My Love is Pink" on YouTube

"My Love Is Pink" is a song by English girl group Sugababes from their fifth studio album, Change (2007). It was written by band members Keisha Buchanan and Heidi Range in collaboration with the songwriting and production team Xenomania, who produced the song. "My Love Is Pink" is an uptempo dance-pop and electropop song, reminiscent of those performed by British girl group, Girls Aloud. The song was released on 10 December 2007 in the United Kingdom and Ireland as the sole promotional single from Change. It received mixed reviews from critics, who praised the composition and sound, but criticised its lyrical content. The song peaked at number five on the UK Commercial Pop Club chart and number 51 on the Slovak Singles Chart.

== Background and composition ==
"My Love Is Pink"
A sample of "My Love Is Pink", showing the chorus and displaying the upbeat, Girls Aloud style dance-pop and electropop tune.

"My Love Is Pink" was written by Sugababes members Keisha Buchanan and Heidi Range in collaboration with the British songwriting and production team Xenomania, consisting of Miranda Cooper, Brian Higgins, Tim Powell, Lisa Cowling and Nick Coler. Higgins and Xenomania produced the song. It was mixed by Powell and Higgins; programmed it with Cooper and Gray. "My Love Is Pink" was sent to digital retailers in the United Kingdom and Ireland on 10 December 2007 as the second single from Change.

The song is an uptempo dance-pop and electropop record with a high-energy dance beat. The instrumentation is provided by keyboards and a guitar. Nick Levine of Digital Spy described it as a "slightly unhinged handbag anthem operating at the point where nineties dance and noughties electro collide". Several critics noted similarities between the song and those performed by British girl group, Girls Aloud. "My Love Is Pink" was also considered by critics to be a gay anthem.

== Reception ==
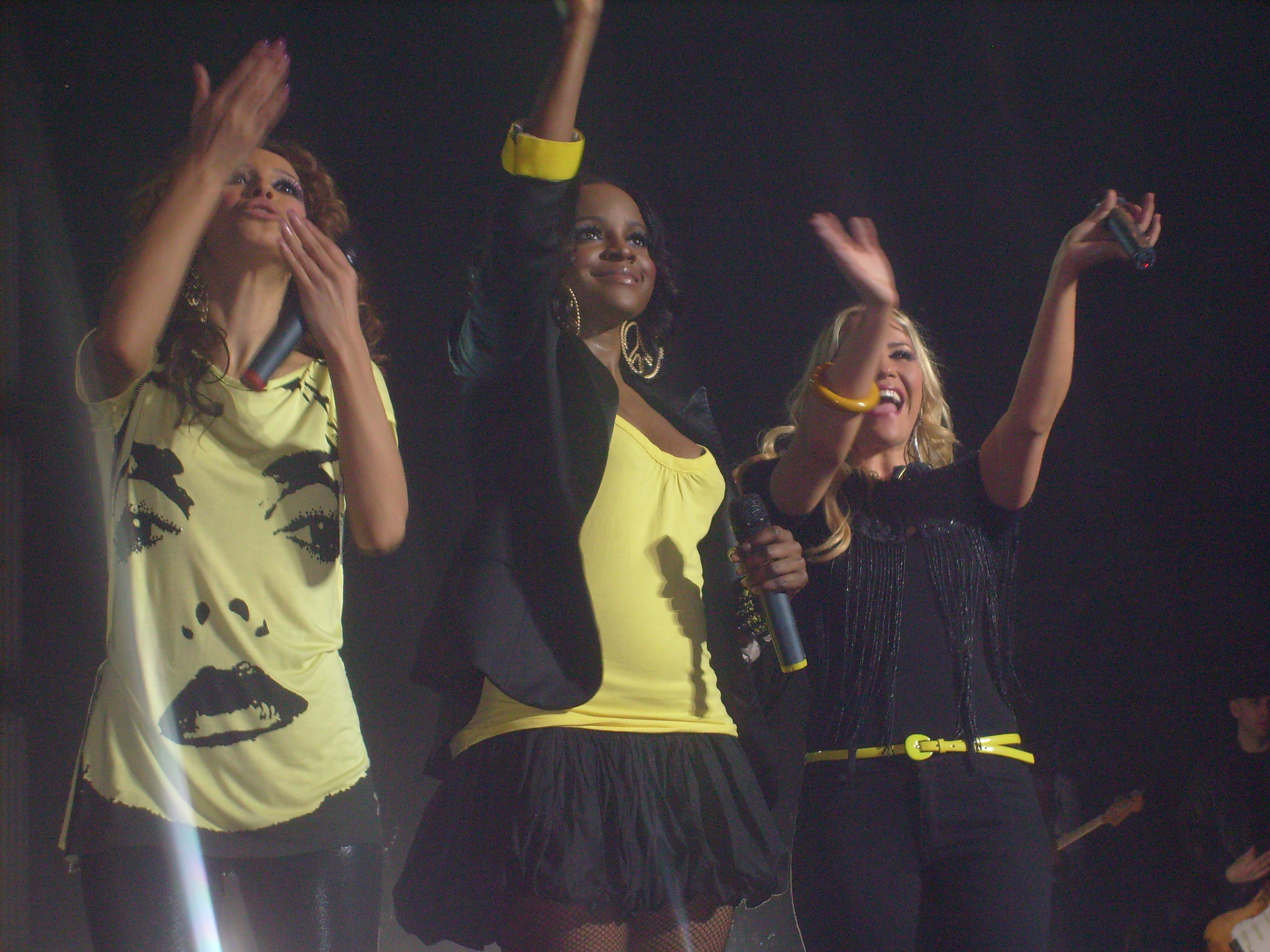
The Sugababes performing live during the Change Tour in 2008.

The song received mixed reviews from critics, who were ambivalent towards its composition. Thomas H Green of The Daily Telegraph described it as "belligerently fizzing pop". Alexis Petridis of The Guardian labelled the track as "propulsive" and regarded it as a classy example of the group's "trademark clever, referential pop". Victoria Segal of The Times described "My Love Is Pink" as indestructible, and wrote that it confirms the group's status as "the bionic band". Lauren Murphy of Entertainment Ireland characterised it as one of the album's "sense-stirring tracks", while BBC's Tom Young praised the track as "sassy and Girls Aloud-like". According to Leon McDermott of The Sunday Herald, the song "jumps and squelches with its sassy brio". A critic from The Liverpool Daily Post & Echo considered it one of the album's highlights.

However, the song's lyrics were a focal point for criticism. Andy Gill of The Independent dismissed it as a "euphemism too far", while Keith Bruce of The Sunday Herald called the song "lyrically awful". Gavin Martin of the Daily Mirror described it a "frisky but a pale reflection of past G.A.Y. disco glories". Hot Press magazine's Pete Murphy felt that the song was a let-down and called it "standard dancefloor fodder veneered with a patina of urban and/or Afro-Caribbean sophistication". A writer for The Scotsman stated that regarded the song as "another of those anonymous, mass-produced party hits sung by a faceless rent-a-vocalist". Upon its release as a single, "My Love Is Pink" peaked at number five on the UK Commercial Pop Club chart, and number 51 on the Slovak Singles Chart.

== Live performances ==
"My Love Is Pink" was included in the set list for the Sugababes' 2008 Change Tour, in which they wore silver, plastic dresses. The trio performed the song at the Oxegen 2008 festival as part of a set list, which included their number one singles "Freak like Me", "Round Round", "Hole in the Head", "Push the Button" and "About You Now".

== Track listings and formats ==
- Digital single/CD-R Promo
1. My Love Is Pink (Radio Version) – 3:44

== Credits and personnel ==
- Songwriting – Keisha Buchanan, Heidi Range, Miranda Cooper, Brian Higgins, Tim Powell, Lisa Cowling, Nick Coler
- Production – Brian Higgins, Xenomania
- Mixing – Tim Powell, Brian Higgins
- Keyboards – Tim Powell, Brian Higgins, Miranda Cooper, Matt Gray
- Guitar – Nick Coler, Owen Parker
- Programming – Tim Powell, Brian Higgins, Miranda Cooper, Matt Gray
- Vocals – Sugababes

Credits adapted from the liner notes of Change, Island Records.

== Charts ==
Chart (2008)	Peak position
Slovakia Airplay (ČNS IFPI)	51
UK Commercial Pop Club (Music Week)	5

== Release history ==
Region	Date	Format	Label
Ireland	10 December 2007	Digital download	Island Records
United Kingdom	10 December 2007	Digital download	Island Records
