= Antoinette K-Doe =

Spouse of Ernie K-Doe

Antoinette Kador (February 3, 1943 - February 24, 2009) was the spouse of R&B singer Ernie K-Doe. She was also owner of the Mother-in-Law Lounge in New Orleans, a pub and shrine to her late husband. She was a notable cook and costume designer, putting her skills to use to make elaborate suits for Ernie and dresses for herself. Antoinette acted as spokesperson for Hands on Network, a volunteer organization dedicated to Hurricane Katrina relief. Antoinette herself was rescued from the Mother-in-Law Lounge after being stranded by flood waters for seven days, and she was passionate about the rebuilding of her city. A local celebrity, she was known by many as "Miss Antoinette".

After she returned to the city following Katrina, she helped to rebuild the neighborhood by cooking up large servings (often for 200+) of gumbo and other New Orleans favorites to serve to the volunteers who had come to help rebuild.

She died of a heart attack early in the morning on February 24, 2009 (Mardi Gras Day) in New Orleans, Louisiana, at the Mother-In-Law Lounge. She had just closed up the lounge at about three in the morning and was lying down to rest up for Mardi Gras day. Only days earlier, she rode in a float with the famous Ernie K-Doe mannequin in the Krewe of Muses parade.

Miss Antoinette was also the leader of the Baby Dolls, a female Mardi Gras Krewe. With origins dating back to the turn of the 20th century, the Krewe had not existed for many years when Miss Antoinette decided to take it upon herself to start it back up.

In 2008, she was awarded the Heartbeat award at Offbeat magazine's Best of the Beat Awards.
