= Change (Sugababes album) =

2007 studio album by the Sugababes

Studio album by Sugababes
- Released: 8 October 2007
- Recorded: 2006–2007
- Studios: Sarm West (London); Electric Lady (New York City)
- Genres: Pop rock; dance-pop; R&B
- Length: 39:38
- Label: Island
- Producers: Deekay; Novel; Dallas Austin; Flex Turner; Dr. Luke; Jony Rockstar; Xenomania; Elliot Malloy; Tom Nichols

Sugababes chronology
Overloaded: The Singles Collection (2006)	Change (2007)	Catfights and Spotlights (2008)

Singles from Change
- 1. "About You Now" Released: 24 September 2007; 2. "Change" Released: 10 December 2007; 3. "Denial" Released: 10 March 2008

Change is the fifth studio album by British girl group Sugababes. It was released on 8 October 2007, through Island Records. The group worked with a range of producers on the album, including Xenomania, Dallas Austin and Jony Rockstar, along with new collaborators Dr. Luke, Novel, and production team Deekay. The 12-track project incorporates sounds of pop rock, dance-pop, and R&B, and is their first studio album to be recorded with Amelle Berrabah, who joined the group in December 2005, replacing previous member Mutya Buena.

Change was preceded by its lead single, "About You Now", which was a major commercial success, becoming Sugababes' sixth number one single on the UK singles chart and their highest selling single in the country. Two further singles were released from the album: the title track and "Denial", both of which reached the top fifteen in the UK. To support the album, Sugababes embarked on a concert tour, the Change Tour, which began in March 2008 and concluded in May of the same year.

Upon release, Change received mixed reviews from music critics, with praise given for its production and catchiness, but criticism aimed at a perceived inconsistency between tracks. The album debuted at number one on the UK Albums Chart, where it became the band's second number one album, and was certified platinum by the British Phonographic Industry (BPI). Elsewhere, Change reached the top ten in Estonia, Ireland, and Scotland.

== Background and release ==
In June 2006, Sugababes member Heidi Range confirmed to NME that the group were in the process of writing their fifth studio album, while also revealing that a greatest hits album would be released in time for Christmas 2006. In January 2007, it was announced that the Sugababes would be collaborating with fellow British girl group Girls Aloud on the track "Walk This Way", a charity single, as part of that year's Comic Relief. The song was released in March 2007, and debuted at number one on the UK singles chart.

In August 2007, the group announced that the lead single from their upcoming fifth studio album would be titled "About You Now", due for release in September, while revealing that the album would be released that autumn. Subsequently, the group appeared on The Album Chart Show, where they revealed that the project would be titled Change. British newspaper Manchester Evening News reported in September that the album would feature collaborations with producers and songwriters including Dr. Luke, Cathy Dennis, and production team Xemonania. Change was released on 8 October 2007. It marks the group's first studio album with member Amelle Berrabah, who replaced Mutya Buena after her departure in December 2005.

== Recording and composition ==
Change is primarily a pop rock, dance-pop, and R&B album. The group recorded their vocals at various studios in the United Kingdom and the United States, including Sarm West Studios in London, and Electric Lady Studios in New York City. The album was mastered by Chris Parmenidis at Unity Mastering London. In an interview with the Telegraph & Argus in January 2008, Keisha Buchanan explained that, with the album, the group sought to avoid repeating a formula by focusing on ways to improve and exploring ideas they had not previously attempted. She added that the group were "more proud than ever" of the album's songs. Discussing the recording process, Amelle Berrabah stated that "it just clicked" once the group entered the studio, describing the experience as "surprisingly easy" overall.

=== Songs ===
The album's opening track, "About You Now", is an uptempo pop rock song with elements of electro-pop, which was compared to works by Kelly Clarkson, specifically "Since U Been Gone" (2004). The following track, "Never Gonna Dance Again", is a mid-tempo pop song with elements of disco, with Alexis Petridis of The Guardian and Peter Murphy of Hot Press comparing it thematically to "Careless Whisper" (1984) by George Michael. Nick Levine of Digital Spy suggested the song "showcase[s] a more reflective Sugababes" with its "desperately sad disco lament" conveyed through the lyrics "As the final record starts to fade, I feel the dancefloor turning colder". "Denial" continues the album's disco influences, with Sarah Walters of Manchester Evening News also noting hints of '80s soft-rock, and was compared to Gossip's "Standing in the Way of Control" (2005). "My Love Is Pink" drew comparisons to songs performed by fellow British girl group Girls Aloud, and features dance-pop and electro-pop production.

The album's fifth and title track, "Change", is an anthemic pop ballad, which showcases the group's vocal ability. The subsequent tracks "Back When" and "Surprise" feature pop rock and R&B production, with the former being produced by Dallas Austin whom the group previously collaborated with on "Push the Button" (2005). The album's eighth track, "Back Down", contains influences of reggae as noted by Andy Gill of The Independent and Tom Young of BBC Music, with lyrical content that features a "plea for men to satisfy any number of criteria". Another ballad, "Mended by You", follows, which was described by Young as showcasing the group's "irrepressible and watertight harmonies, lead admirably by Berrabah". The following track, "Open The Door", is a mid-tempo R&B song, which was compared by Gill to "Dub Be Good to Me" (1990) by the British dub group Beats International. The album's final track on the standard edition is "Undignified", which was described by Charles Hutchinson of The York Press as having a "deceleration in tempo" compared to "About You Now", while featuring "reflective" lyrics that "mark the move from teen recklessness to mid-20s wounds". The special edition bonus track, "3 Spoons of Suga", which also appears on the soundtrack for the 2007 film St Trinian's, was described by Matt O'Leary of Virgin as a "dancefloor track" featuring "guitar- and beat-led" production.

== Promotion ==
=== Live performances and appearances ===
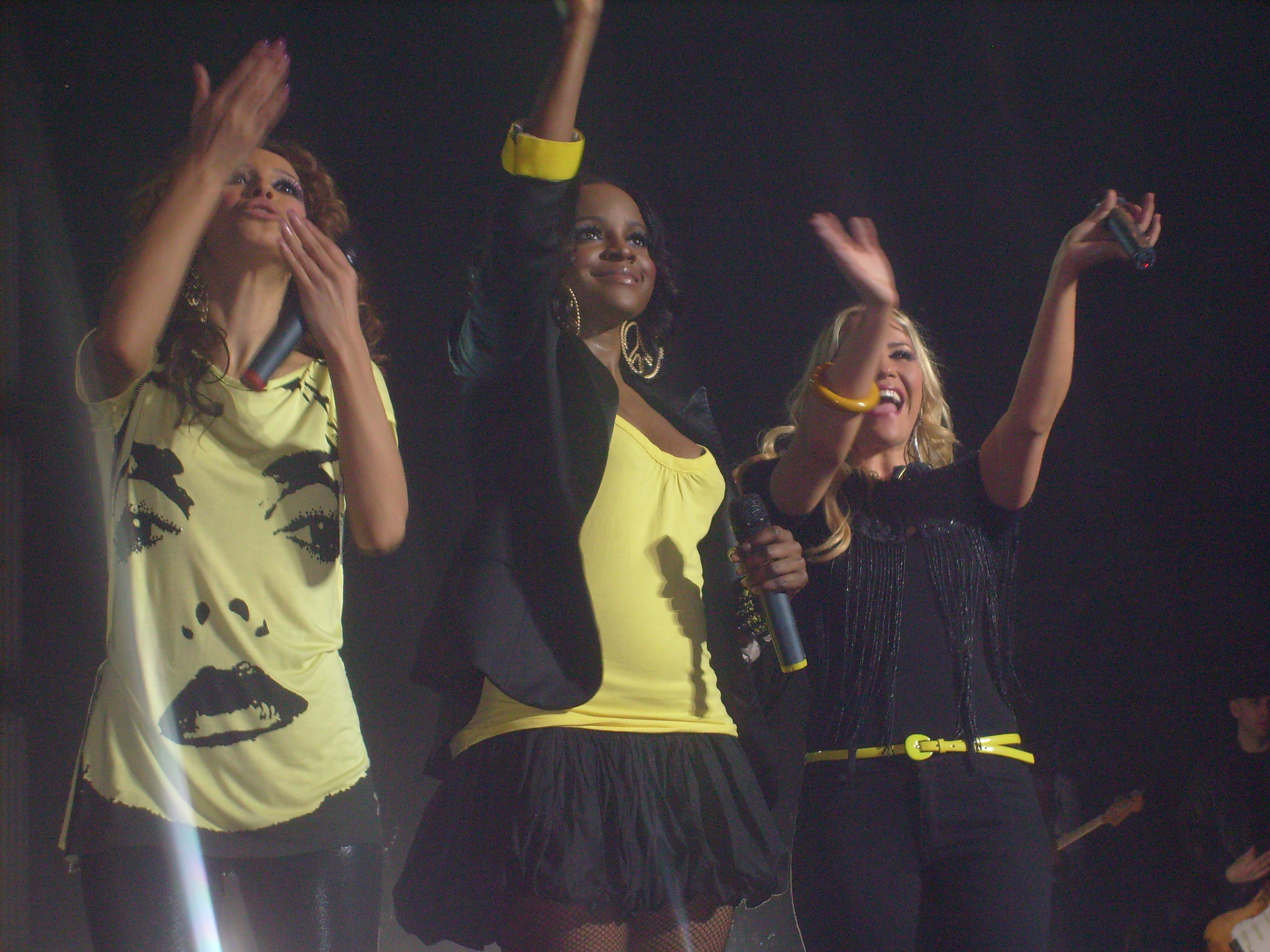
Sugababes performing in Manchester, England, during the Change Tour in 2008

Sugababes began promoting Change prior to the release of the album's first single, including with a performance on Ant & Dec's Saturday Night Takeaway on 8 September 2007, and an appearance on BBC Radio 2 with Jonathan Ross on 15 September. That same month, the group performed a promotional concert at IndigO2, where they sang "About You Now", "Denial", and the album's title track as part of their setlist. In October, the group performed "About You Now" at the 2007 Golden Televizier-Ring Gala in Amsterdam.

In November, the group performed at BBC Children in Need, alongside other acts including the Spice Girls, Kylie Minogue, and Leona Lewis. On 10 December, the release day of the album's second single "Change", Sugababes appeared on BBC Radio 1 and spoke to Scott Mills. On 12 December, the group performed an acoustic version of "Change" in Scotland, as part of Radio Clyde's Up Close series, and the following day, they performed the song on the The Paul O'Grady Show. In June 2008, Sugababes performed "About You Now" as part of the Nelson Mandela 90th Birthday Tribute in Hyde Park, London. The following month, the group performed a setlist of songs at the Oxegen Festival in Ireland, which included "Denial" and "About You Now".

=== Singles and music videos ===
The album's first single, "About You Now", was released on 24 September 2007. The song's music video was filmed in August 2007, at the Royal Festival Hall in London, and was directed by Marcus Adams. "About You Now" became Sugababes' sixth number-one on the UK singles chart, and their most successful song in the country, moving 1.4 million units since its release. It was nominated for Best British Single at the Brit Awards 2008. The song was also used in the movie Wild Child and features as track three on the soundtrack. A promotional single, "My Love Is Pink", was released on 10 December 2007. The track became a club hit in the United Kingdom, reaching number five on the Commercial Pop Top 30 chart in January 2008.

The second single from Change, the album's title track, was digitally released on 10 December 2007 alongside "My Love Is Pink", and physically released a week later. The music video for "Change" was directed by Fatima Andrade Koehler, and was filmed in November 2007. The track peaked at number thirteen on the UK singles chart, spending fourteen weeks overall on the tally. Elsewhere, "Change" reached the top forty in Ireland, Germany, the Netherlands, Romania, and Scotland.

The album's third and final single, "Denial", was digitally released on 10 March 2008, and physically released a week later. The song's music video was directed by Harvey B-Brown, who would later become the creative director for the group's 2008 tour. "Denial" reached number fifteen on the UK singles chart, where it spent eleven weeks overall. The track also experienced success in Central Europe, reaching number four in Austria, number eleven in Germany, and number fourteen in Switzerland.

=== Tour ===
To promote the album, Sugababes embarked on the Change Tour in March 2008, consisting of thirty shows across the United Kingdom, mostly in theatres or smaller venues. The trek included a sold-out show at the Royal Albert Hall in London. The tour received positive reviews from local critics, with praise given for the group's vocals and the tour's production.

== Critical reception ==
Professional ratings
Review scores
Source	Rating
AllMusic	3.5/5 stars
Digital Spy	4/5 stars
Evening Standard	3/5 stars
The Guardian	3/5 stars
The Independent	2/5 stars
NME	4/10
The Times	3/5 stars
Virgin	3/5 stars
Yahoo! Music	4/10

Upon release, Change received mixed reviews from music critics. (Note: Attributed to reviews by multiple sources:) Writing for AllMusic, Sharon Mawer described Change as "a slice of sophisticated dance-pop" with "hummable songs and good melodies". Alexis Petridis of The Guardian compared the album's lead single "About You Now" to Kelly Clarkson's song "Since U Been Gone" (2004), and praised "Never Gonna Dance Again" and "My Love Is Pink" as "classy examples of [the Sugababes] trademark clever, referential pop". He highlighted "Denial" as a "beautifully-crafted bulletproof pop song", and "Back Down" as a "pleasingly odd conjunction of reggae skank and synthesised squelch". Petridis criticised Dallas Austin's production on the track "Back When", describing it as "dreary", while dubbing the rest of the album a "mixed bag".

Writing for Digital Spy, Nick Levine criticised the tracks "Open The Door" and "Back When", describing the former as "dated mid-tempo R&B" and the latter as "folk-pop ditty", but praised the album overall as being the group's "most consistently entertaining album since their debut". Levine highlighted "Denial", "Never Gonna Dance Again", "About You Now", "Change", "My Love Is Pink", and "Back Down" as standouts from the album, and suggested that the group have "managed a nifty trick on Change" by "maturing without surrendering their pop smarts". In a review for The Times, Mark Edwards praised the Sugababes for their "ability to turn out superior hits [remaining] remarkably consistent [sic]". Edwards praised the production on the track "About You Now", but suggested the album's songwriting was sub-par compared to the group's previous work such as on the song "Ugly" (2005). Matt O'Leary of Virgin described the tracks on Change as "polished and sassy", but compared the album unfavourably to the group's previous work, stating that "you’ve heard better versions of each [song] by the same band before". O'Leary concluded that Change "isn’t weak or misrepresentative of the girls’ undeniable talent and presence, but it’s just not as good as they’re capable of". In a review for the Evening Standard, John Aizlewood described the album as "another selection of super-taut, super-efficient handbag pop", highlighting "About You Now" and "Denial" as standouts", while suggesting that the album's strength lies in the group's "refusal to change their sound" despite their lineup changes.

Writing for The Independent, Andy Gill highlighted "Back Down" and "Open The Door" as standouts from Change, but wrote that "elsewhere, things are fraying dangerously". Gill described the album's title track as "colourless" and "leaden", and criticised the songwriting on "My Love Is Pink" and the production on "About You Now", concluding that the album "isn't a change for the better". In a review of the album by NME, Change was dubbed as being "repetitive pop that fails to keep up with the melodies of Girls Aloud". In a review for Yahoo! Music, Emily Mackay criticised the songwriting on "My Love Is Pink", describing it as "odd rather than filthy", and dubbed the title track "plain awful, a limper retread of 'Stronger'". She praised the special edition track "3 Spoons of Suga" as a "glammy strut" that finds the group on "stronger footing", while highlighting "Back Down" as a standout.

== Commercial performance ==
In the United Kingdom, Change debuted at number one on the UK Albums Chart with 53,540 copies sold in its first week, becoming the group's second number one album in the country. In the same week, the album's lead single, "About You Now", placed at number one on the UK singles chart, giving the group their second chart double. In doing so, they became the only girl group other than the Spice Girls to achieve a UK chart double more than once, having previously done so in 2005 with their album Taller in More Ways and its lead single "Push the Button" (2005). In December 2007, Change was certified platinum by the British Phonographic Industry (BPI), denoting sales of 300,000 copies. As of November 2008, the album had sold 494,485 copies in the United Kingdom.

Elsewhere, Change debuted at number one in Scotland, becoming their second number one album there following Taller in More Ways. In Ireland, the album peaked at number ten on the Irish Albums Chart. In Europe, the album was less successful than its predecessor Taller in More Ways, however it still attained top-forty placements on the album charts in Austria, the Czech Republic, Estonia, Germany, and Switzerland, while reaching the lower regions of the album chart in the Netherlands. In France, Change became the Sugababes' first entry on the French albums chart since Three (2003), where it spent four weeks, peaking at number one-hundred and five. On the European Albums chart, Change peaked at number ten.

== Track listing ==
Standard edition
No.	Title	Writer(s)	Producer(s)	Length
1.	"About You Now"	Cathy Dennis; Lukasz Gottwald	Dr. Luke; Rob Smith^{[a]}; Steven Wolf^{[a]}	3:32
2.	"Never Gonna Dance Again"	Keisha Buchanan; Heidi Range; Miranda Cooper; Brian Higgins; Tim Powell; Lisa Cowling; Nick Coler	Higgins; Xenomania	3:43
3.	"Denial"	Range; Buchanan; Amelle Berrabah; Geeki; Flex Turner; Elliot Malloy	Malloy; Turner	3:31
4.	"My Love Is Pink"	Buchanan; Range; Cooper; Higgins; Powell; Cowling; Coler	Higgins; Xenomania	3:44
5.	"Change"	Lars Halvor Jensen; Martin Michael Larsson; Niara Scarlett; Range; Buchanan; Berrabah	Deekay; Dicky Daniel Klein^{[a]}; Thomas McEwan^{[a]}; Lars H. Jensen^{[b]}	3:37
6.	"Back When"	Dallas Austin; Gary White	Austin; JC Chasez^{[b]}	3:56
7.	"Surprise"	Dennis; Gottwald	Dr. Luke; Smith^{[a]}; Wolf^{[a]}	3:05
8.	"Back Down"	Alonzo Stevenson; Tony Reyes; Buchanan; Range; Berrabah	Novel	3:50
9.	"Mended by You"	Range; Buchanan; Jony Lipsey; Karen Poole; Jeremy Shaw	Jony Rockstar	3:34
10.	"Open the Door"	Buchanan; Range; Dennis; Gottwald	Dr. Luke; Smith^{[a]}; Wolf^{[a]}	3:16
11.	"Undignified"	Tom Nichols; Turner; Buchanan; Range; Berrabah	Turner; Nichols	3:45
Total length:				39:38

Special edition
No.	Title	Writer(s)	Producer(s)	Length
10.	"3 Spoons of Suga"	Range; Buchanan; Berrabah; Lipsey; Poole; Shaw	Rockstar	3:50
11.	"Open the Door"	Buchanan; Range; Dennis; Gottwald	Dr. Luke; Smith^{[a]}; Wolf^{[a]}	3:16
12.	"Undignified"	Tom Nichols; Turner; Buchanan; Range; Berrabah	Turner; Nichols	3:45
Total length:				43:25

French edition (Note: In France, Change was released as the Sugababes' first greatest hits album. The tracklist mirrors that of the group's greatest hits album Overloaded: The Singles Collection (2006), which was not released in the country, with the addition of "About You Now", "Change", and "Denial".)
No.	Title	Writer(s)	Original album	Length
1.	"About You Now"	Dennis; Gottwald	Change (2007)	3:32
2.	"Change"	Jensen; Larsson; Scarlett; Range; Buchanan; Berrabah	Change	3:37
3.	"Denial"	Range; Buchanan; Berrabah; Geeki; Turner; Malloy	Change	3:31
4.	"Freak Like Me"	Eugene Hanes; Marc Valentine; Loren Hill; William Collins; George Clinton; Gary Numan	Angels with Dirty Faces (2002)	3:15
5.	"Round Round"	Brian Higgins; Miranda Cooper; Lisa Cowling; Coler; Buchanan; Mutya Buena; Range; Florian Pflueger; Felix Stecher; Robin Hofmann; Rino Spadavecchia	Angels with Dirty Faces	3:57
6.	"Red Dress"	Buchanan; Buena; Range; Higgins; Cooper; Powell; Coler; Shawn Lee; Cowling; Bob Bradley	Taller in More Ways (2005)	3:38
7.	"In the Middle"	Cooper; Higgins; Scarlett; Lee; Lisa Cowling; Buchanan; Buena; Range; Andre Tegler; Phil Fuldner; Michael Bellina	Three (2003)	3:55
8.	"Stronger"	Jony Lipsey; Marius De Vries; Felix Howard; Buchanan; Buena; Range	Angels with Dirty Faces	4:04
9.	"Shape"	Sting; Dominic Miller; Craigie	Angels with Dirty Faces	4:12
10.	"Overload"	Buchanan; Buena; Siobhán Donaghy; Howard; Cameron McVey; Paul Simm; Lipsey	One Touch (2000)	4:38
11.	"Good to Be Gone"	Jason Pebworth; George Astasio; Buchanan; Range; Berrabah	Overloaded: The Singles Collection (2006)	3:27
12.	"Caught in a Moment"	Lipsey; Poole; de Vries; Buchanan; Buena; Range	Three	4:26
13.	"Ugly"	Austin	Taller in More Ways	3:51
14.	"Easy"	Pebworth; Astasio; Buchanan; Range; Berrabah	Overloaded: The Singles Collection	3:39
15.	"Too Lost in You"	Diane Warren	Three	4:00
16.	"Hole in the Head"	Higgins; Range; Buchanan; Cooper; Buena; Scarlett; Coler; Powell	Three	3:39
17.	"Push the Button"	Buchanan; Buena; Range; Austin	Taller in More Ways	3:38
Total length:				64:54

Notes

- ^{^[a]} denotes additional producer
- ^{^[b]} denotes vocal producer

== Personnel ==
Credits adapted from Apple Music.

=== Musicians ===
- Keisha Buchanan – lead vocals (all tracks)
- Heidi Range – lead vocals (all tracks)
- Amelle Berrabah – lead vocals (all tracks)
- Dr. Luke – drums (tracks 1, 10), guitar, bass, programming (tracks 1, 7, 10)
- Tina Kennedy – guitar (tracks 1, 7, 10)
- Brian Higgins – keyboards, programming (track 2)
- Tim Powell – keyboards, programming (tracks 2, 4)
- Miranda Cooper – keyboards, programming (tracks 2, 4)
- Matt Gray – keyboards, programming (tracks 2, 4)
- Nick Coler – guitar (tracks 2, 4)
- Elliott Maloy – programming (track 3)
- Flex Turner – guitar, programming (tracks 3, 11)
- Pete Martin – keyboards, programming (track 3)
- Jeremy Wheatley – keyboards, programming (track 3)
- Owen Parker – guitar (track 4)
- Johannes Joergensen – guitar (track 5)
- Tim McEwan – percussion (track 5)
- Dicky Daniel Klein – percussion (track 5)
- Lars Halvor Jensen – keyboards, all instruments (track 5)
- Martin Michael Larsson – keyboards, bass guitar, all instruments (track 5)
- Dallas Austin – drums (track 6)
- Tony Reyes – guitar (tracks 6, 8)
- Novel – background vocals, keyboards, drums, programming (track 8)
- Jony Rockstar – bass guitar, programming (track 9)
- Jeremy Shaw – keyboards, guitar (track 9)
- Tom Nichols – percussion, programming (track 11)
- Tim VanDerKuil – bass guitar (track 11)

=== Technical ===
- Serban Ghenea – mixing engineer (tracks 1, 7, 10)
- John Hanes – engineering (track 1), editing engineer (tracks 7, 10)
- Kurt Read -– engineering (tracks 1, 7, 10)
- Tim Roberts – assistant mixing engineer (tracks 1, 7, 10)
- Mark Lewis – assistant recording engineer (tracks 1, 7, 10)
- Rob Smith – engineering (tracks 1, 7, 10)
- Aniela Gottwald – assistant recording engineer (tracks 1, 10)
- Jeremy Wheatley – mixing engineer (tracks 2–3, 6, 11)
- Richard Edgeler – assistant mixing engineer (tracks 2–3, 6, 11)
- Tim Powell – mixing engineer (track 4)
- Johannes Joergensen – vocal recording engineer (track 5)
- Martin Michael Larsson – mixing engineer (track 5)
- Lars Halvor Jensen – vocal producer, vocal recording engineer (track 5)
- Jordan Young – recording engineer (track 5)
- JC Chasez – vocal producer (track 6)
- Andrew Nitsch – assistant engineer (track 6)
- Tatiana Gottwald – assistant recording engineer (track 7)
- Carlton Lynn – mixing engineer (track 8)
- Pete Craigie – mixing engineer, engineer (track 9)
- Rohan Onraet – recording engineer (track 11)

== Charts and certifications ==
=== Weekly charts ===
Chart (2007–08)	Peak position
Australian Albums (ARIA)	90
Austrian Albums (Ö3 Austria)	32
Czech Albums (IFPI)	38
Dutch Albums (MegaCharts)	69
European Albums (Billboard)	10
Estonian Albums (Pedrobeat)	4
French Albums (SNEP) French edition	105
German Albums (Media Control)	33
Irish Albums (IRMA)	10
Scottish Albums (OCC)	1
Swiss Albums (Schweizer Hitparade)	14
UK Albums (OCC)	1
UK R&B Albums (OCC)	1

=== Year-end charts ===
Chart (2007)	Position
UK Albums (OCC)	32

=== Certifications ===
Region	Certification	Certified units/sales
Ireland (IRMA)	Platinum	15,000^{^}
United Kingdom (BPI)	Platinum	494,485
^{^} Shipments figures based on certification alone.

== Release history ==
Release dates and formats
Region	Date	Edition	Format(s)	Label	Ref.
United Kingdom	8 October 2007	Standard; special	CD; digital download	Island	
Netherlands	8 October 2007	Standard	CD; digital download	Island	
Ireland	12 October 2007	Standard	CD; digital download	Island	
Austria	19 October 2007	Standard	CD; digital download	Island	
Germany	19 October 2007	Standard	CD; digital download	Island	
Switzerland	19 October 2007	Standard	CD; digital download	Island	
France	17 March 2008	French	CD; digital download	Island	
