= Minit Records =

American independent record label

- One logo included on many of their records starting in 1966
- Founded: 1959
- Founder: Joe Banashak
- Defunct: 1971
- Genre: R&B, Soul
- Country of origin: United States
- Location: New Orleans

Minit Records was an American independent record label, originally based in New Orleans and founded by Joe Banashak in 1959. Ernie K-Doe, Aaron Neville, Irma Thomas, and Benny Spellman were early artists on the label. Later artists included Bobby Womack and Ike & Tina Turner.

== History ==
Logo used from c. 1961-1963

Allen Toussaint was responsible for much of the label's early success, he wrote, produced, arranged and played piano on a number of tracks. The label's first hit was Toussaint's production of "Ooh Poo Pah Doo - Part 2" by Jessie Hill in 1960. After making a distribution deal with Imperial Records, the label released its biggest hit, "Mother-in Law" by Ernie K-Doe reached the top of the Billboard Hot 100 and the R&B singles chart in 1961.

When Allen Toussaint was drafted into the Army in 1963, the hits dried up and the label was sold to Imperial. Banashak also owned Instant Records, which he kept. Minit was acquired by Liberty Records in 1963 as part of its acquisition of Imperial Records. In 1968, Liberty was bought by Transamerica Corporation and combined with United Artists Records. Two years later Imperial and Minit were shut down and transferred to Liberty. In 1971, Liberty and its remaining labels (except for Soul City, whose catalog was sold to Bell Records) were absorbed into United Artists. In 1979, EMI purchased United Artists. The Minit catalog is currently owned by UMG, successor-in-interest to previous owner EMI.

== Label variations ==
- 1961-1963: (catalog #s MR-601-626) Orange with black print and disclaimer indicating "C/O Imperial Records, Hollywood, Calif. Later pressings of some records in this period are on the second label."
- 1961-1963 (catalog #s 626-666): Black label with multi-color logo centered at top reading "MINIT RECORDS" with clock inside lettering; in middle of label, magenta bars contain publishing information and track time (left), catalog number and performance type (right). Silver print for all other text, including disclaimer at bottom which reads "PRODUCED AND MANUFACTURED BY IMPERIAL RECORDS INC. HOLLYWOOD 28, CALIFORNIA, U.S.A."
- 1964-1968: (new series, catalog #s 32000-32076) Black label with silver print, multi-color logo on left side with "MINIT" inside the logo and "A PRODUCT OF LIBERTY RECORDS" under MINIT. Disclaimer at bottom of label reads "A DIVISION OF LIBERTY RECORDS."
- 1969-1970: (catalog #s 32077-32088) Same as black label mentioned above but with the "PRODUCT" disclaimer removed under "MINIT" inside the logo. Disclaimer at bottom of label now reads "LIBERTY/UA, INC."

== Selected discography ==
=== Albums ===
Catalog No.	Release date	US	US R&B	Title	Artist
LP-24005	1966		25	Turning Point	Jimmy Holiday
LP-40007	1967			Like It 'Tis	Aaron Neville
LP-24012	1968			Flippin' - The Very Funny Flip Wilson	Flip Wilson
LP-24014	Jan 1969			Fly Me to the Moon	Bobby Womack
LP-24017	May 1969			The Stinger Man	Jimmy McCracklin
LP-24018	Jun 1969	142	19	In Person	Ike & Tina Turner
LP 24023	1969			Blue All The Way	Tina Britt
LP 24024	Dec 1969			Blues Man	Little Jr. Parker
LP-24027	Apr 1970			My Prescription	Bobby Womack

=== Singles ===
Catalog No.	Release date	US	US R&B	Single (A-side, B-side)	Artist
607	Feb 1960	28	3	"Ooh Poo Pah Doo - Part 1" b/w "Ooh Poo Pah - Part 2"	Jessie Hill
611	Jun 1960	91		"Whip It On Me" b/w 'I Need Your Love"	Jessie Hill
623	Jan 1961	1	1	"Mother-In-Law" b/w "Wanted, $10,000.00 Reward"	Ernie K-Doe
627	May 1961	53	21	"Te-Ta-Te-Ta-Ta" b/w "Real Man"	Ernie K-Doe
32002	May 1966	98	21	"Baby, I Love You" b/w "You Won't Get Away"	Jimmy Holiday
32016	Jan 1967		36	"Everybody Needs Help b/w "Give Me Your Love"	Jimmy Holiday
32027	Feb 1968		33	"What Is This" b/w "What You Gonna Do (When Your Love Is Gone)"	Bobby Womack
32048	Jul 1968	52	16	"Fly Me to the Moon" b/w "Take Me"	Bobby Womack
32055	Nov 1968	43	20	"California Dreamin'" b/w "Baby, You Oughta Think It Over"	Bobby Womack
32059	Mar 1969		48	"I Left My Heart in San Francisco" b/w "Love, the Time Is Now"	Bobby Womack
32060	Mar 1969	98	46	"I'm Gonna Do All I Can (To Do Right by My Man)" b/w "You've Got Too Many Ties That Bind"	Ike & Tina Turner
32071	Jul 1969		43	"It's Gonna Rain" b/w "Thank You"	Bobby Womack
32981	Oct 1969	94	13	"How I Miss You Baby" b/w "Tried and Convicted"	Bobby Womack
32087	Jan 1970	57	21	"Come Together" b/w "Honky Tonk Women"	Ike & Tina Turner
32093	Mar 1970	90	23	"More Than I Can Stand" b/w "Arkansas State Prison"	Bobby Womack

== See also ==
- List of record labels
