= Change Tour =

2008 concert tour by Sugababes

- UK tour by Sugababes
- Associated album: Change
- Start date: 12 March 2008
- End date: 1 May 2008
- Legs: 1
- No. of shows: 30

Sugababes concert chronology
- The Greatest Hits Tour (2007); Change Tour (2008); The Sacred Three Tour (2013)

The Change Tour is the fourth concert tour by British girl group Sugababes. It supported their fifth studio album, Change. The tour began with two nights in Brentwood on 12 March and 13 March 2008, with the final show on 1 May 2008 in Derby. The 30-date tour is their longest yet. Harvey B-Brown, director of the "Denial" video, directed the tour.

== General information ==
Although they could "easily sell out arenas," the majority of the shows are in more intimate venues. Amelle Berrabah said of the show that they will "be dancing a bit more" and that "the costumes are brilliant." Overall, there are ten costume changes. Keisha Buchanan stated "This is probably the most we've done on the tour, so it was a bit full on." They use doppelgängers to do much of the dancing and interpreting. Sugababes performed a shortened version of the tour at 2008's V Festival, and the Liverpool Summer Pops.

The band pulled out of a scheduled appearance at Scotland's T in the Park music festival, which angered many Scottish fans. While the band had been widely advertised as a Main Stage act, management for the girls' claimed that they were never booked for the festival. Geoff Ellis, organiser of T, refuted these claims. Just a few days after they pulled out, the band announced a concert with fellow popstars McFly in London on the day they were due to be at T. It was later revealed, by the Daily Record, that the real reason the girls pulled out was fear by tour management that they would not be well received by fans of festival headliners Rage Against the Machine waiting at the Main Stage to see the aforementioned act.

== Support acts ==
- Gabriella Cilmi
- Luigi Masi
- Van Tramp

== Setlist ==
1. "Hole in the Head" (contains elements of "Don't Stop The Music")
2. "Round Round"
3. "Never Gonna Dance Again"
4. "In the Middle"
5. "Ugly"
6. "Freak like Me"/"Virgin Sexy"
7. "Back Down"
8. "Too Lost in You" (piano version)
9. "Don't Let Go (Love)" (En Vogue cover)
10. "Denial"
11. "Change"
12. "Mended By You"/"Stronger"
13. "3 Spoons of Suga"/"Overload"
14. "Red Dress" (Rockamerica remix) (contains elements of "Two Tribes")
15. "My Love Is Pink"

Encore

16. "Push the Button"
17. "About You Now"

== Critical response ==
The critical reaction to the tour was extremely positive, with reviewers praising their vocals and their first attempt at extravagant costumes. A critique from The Times noted that the use of doppelgängers was applauded, because "no incarnation of Sugababes has been able to execute even relatively simple choreographed routines with flair." The reviewer joked that the band "even did a bit of dancing." The tour was described as "refreshing," inspired by Kylie Minogue's "stylish concerts." The Daily Star stated that "it's only minimal fine-tuning that will soon make this one of the best live shows of 2008 – with faultless singing." The review called their cover of En Vogue's "Don't Let Go (Love)" a breathtaking highlight. It has been called "a slick, polished show" and that "for all the flashy sets and multiple costume changes...it was the harmonies and sheer power of the voices which most impressed." The Express & Star labeled the show "a classy, grown-up affair devoid of tack and at times truly outstanding." The Daily Record went as far as saying that "Keisha, Heidi and Amelle - who have been hailed the most successful UK girl group of the 21st century - belted out 20 tracks and thoroughly earned the title."

== Tour dates ==
Date	City	Country	Venue
12 March 2008	Brentwood	England	Brentwood Leisure Centre
13 March 2008	Brentwood	England	Brentwood Leisure Centre
14 March 2008	Brighton	England	Brighton Dome
16 March 2008	Plymouth	England	Plymouth Pavilions
17 March 2008	Oxford	England	New Theatre
18 March 2008	Southend-on-Sea	England	Southend Cliffs Pavilion
20 March 2008	London	England	Royal Albert Hall
22 March 2008	Portsmouth	England	Portsmouth Guildhall
25 March 2008	Newcastle	England	Newcastle City Hall
26 March 2008	Glasgow	Scotland	Clyde Auditorium
28 March 2008	Wolverhampton	England	Wolverhampton Civic Hall
29 March 2008	Blackburn	England	King Georges Hall
31 March 2008	Bradford	England	St. George's Hall
1 April 2008	Manchester	England	Manchester Apollo
2 April 2008	Manchester	England	Manchester Apollo
4 April 2008	Grimsby	England	Grimsby Auditorium
5 April 2008	Bristol	England	Colston Hall
7 April 2008	Sheffield	England	Sheffield City Hall
8 April 2008	Cambridge	England	Cambridge Corn Exchange
9 April 2008	Leicester	England	De Montfort Hall
11 April 2008	Harrogate	England	Harrogate International Centre
13 April 2008	Liverpool	England	Liverpool Philharmonic Hall
18 April 2008	Reading	England	Hexagon Theatre
19 April 2008	Preston	England	Preston Guildhall
21 April 2008	Bournemouth	England	Bournemouth International Centre
22 April 2008	Swindon	England	Oasis Leisure Centre
23 April 2008	Cardiff	Wales	Cardiff International Arena
27 April 2008	Edinburgh	Scotland	Edinburgh Playhouse
28 April 2008	Carlisle	England	Carlisle Sands Centre
1 May 2008	Derby	England	Derby Assembly Rooms
