= Here Come the Girls (song) =

Single by Ernie K-Doe
- Released: 1971
- Genre: Funk; soul
- Length: 3:09
- Label: Janus
- Songwriter: Allen Toussaint
- Producer: Allen Toussaint

"Here Come the Girls" is a song written by Allen Toussaint and recorded by American R&B singer Ernie K-Doe and released in 1971.

In 2007 the Boots pharmacy chain used the song for two separate television commercials (August 2007; summer 2008). This led to the song re-charting (at number 43 for five weeks in the UK; and number 48 in 2007 in Ireland and again at #89 for two weeks in 2008). In 2022, consumer website Shortlist included "Here Come the Girls" on its list of "Amazing songs that TV adverts completely ruined".

The Sugababes, an English girl group, saw the Boots advert and subsequently decided to interpolate it for their 2008 single "Girls". "Girls" reached No. 3 in the UK and No. 12 in Ireland, and was certified silver by the BPI. After August 2008, it was their song which was used in the Boots adverts.

Trombone Shorty covered the song in 2017.
