= Mother-in-Law (song) =

1961 single by Ernie K-Doe

Single by Ernie K-Doe

from the album Mother-In-Law
- B-side: "Wanted, $10,000.00 Reward"
- Released: 1961
- Recorded: April 25, 1960
- Studio: Cosimo (New Orleans, Louisiana)
- Genre: New Orleans R&B
- Length: 2:25
- Label: Minit
- Songwriter: Allen Toussaint
- Producer: Allen Toussaint

Ernie K-Doe singles chronology
"Mother-in-Law" (1961)	"Te-Ta-Te-Ta-Ta" (1961)

"Mother-in-Law" is a 1961 song recorded by Ernie K-Doe, backed by Benny Spellman. It was a number-one hit in the U.S. on both the Billboard Hot 100 chart and the Billboard R&B chart. The song was written and produced by Allen Toussaint, who also played the piano solo. It was issued by Minit Records.

After several unsuccessful takes, Toussaint balled up the composition and threw it away as he was leaving the room. One of the backup singers, Willie Harper, thought that it was such a good song that he convinced K-Doe to give it one more try.

A cover version by The Newbeats was also included on their 1965 album Big Beat Sounds by The Newbeats. The Ohio Players also covered the song on their debut LP, Observations in Time.

== See also ==
- List of Billboard Hot 100 number ones of 1961
- List of number-one R&B singles of 1961 (U.S.)
- Mother-in-law joke
