= My Prescription =

Studio album by Bobby Womack
- Released: February 1970
- Recorded: 1969
- Genre: R&B
- Length: 31:44
- Label: Minit
- Producer: Chips Moman

Bobby Womack chronology
Fly Me to the Moon (1969)	My Prescription (1970)	Communication (1971)

Professional ratings
Review scores
Source	Rating
The Encyclopedia of Popular Music	3/5 stars

My Prescription is the second studio album by American singer-songwriter Bobby Womack. The album was released in February 1970, by Minit Records. It was arranged by Bobby Womack, Glen Spreen and Mike Leech. The cover photography was by Herb Kravitz.

== Track listing ==
All tracks composed by Bobby Womack and Darryl Carter; except where indicated

No.	Title	Writer(s)	Length
1.	"How I Miss You Baby"		3:16
2.	"More Than I Can Stand"		2:51
3.	"It's Gonna Rain"		2:24
4.	"Everyone's Gone to the Moon"	Jonathan King	2:37
5.	"I Can't Take It Like a Man"	Jimmy Williams, Larry Weiss	3:05
6.	"I Left My Heart in San Francisco"	Douglass Cross, George Cory	2:23
7.	"Arkansas State Prison"	Bob Morrison	2:57
8.	"I'm Gonna Forget About You"	Sam Cooke	2:26
9.	"Don't Look Back"	Ronald White, William Robinson	2:48
10.	"Tried and Convicted"	Womack	2:48
11.	"Fly Me to the Moon (In Other Words)"	Bart Howard	2:09
12.	"Thank You"		4:07
