= List of programs broadcast by VH1 (Europe) =

This is a list of television programs broadcast by VH1 Europe in Europe.

== Last programming ==
=== Music series ===
- 00s Power Ballads (2021)
- The 40 Greatest Hits (2021)
- [Artist]: The Hits (2019–2021)
- Class of 2000–2009 (2021)
- Crazy in Love! (only August 1, 2021)
- Guess the Year (2014–2021)
- Hits Don't Lie (2015–2021)
- Hottest 00s Collabs (2021)
- Hottest 00s Dance Hits (2021)
- Hottest 00s Pop Hits (2021)
- Hottest 00s R'n'B Hits (2021)
- Loudest 00s Rock Anthems (2021)
- Non-Stop Nostalgia (2021)
- Songs of the Century (2020–2021)
- Top 50 (2014–2021)
- VH1 Shuffle (2012–2021)
- We Love the: 00's (2015–2021)

=== Artists' series ===
- Adele (2019–2020)
- Alicia Keys (2021)
- Ariana Grande (2019–2020)
- Beyoncé (2019–2021)
- Black Eyed Peas (2021)
- Britney Spears (2021)
- Bruno Mars (2019–2020)
- Calvin Harris (2019–2021)
- Coldplay (2019–2021)
- Dua Lipa (2020)
- Elton John (2020–2021)
- Ed Sheeran (2019–2021)
- George Michael (2020–2021)
- Jennifer Lopez (2021)
- Justin Bieber (2020–2021)
- Justin Timberlake (2019–2021)
- Katy Perry (2019–2021)
- Kelly Clarkson (2020)
- Kylie (2020–2021)
- Lady Gaga (2019–2021)
- Little Mix (2020)
- Madonna (2019–2021)
- Maroon 5 (2019–2021)
- One Direction (2019–2021)
- P!nk (2019–2021)
- Queen (2019–2020)
- Rihanna (2019–2021)
- Sam Smith (2020)
- Shawn Mendes (2020)
- Taylor Swift (2019–2021)
- Whitney Houston (2020–2021)

=== Top 50 series ===
- 00's Boys (2021)
- 00's Collabs (2021)
- 00's vs. 10's (2019–2021)
- 00's Greatest Hits (2021)
- 00's Pop Hits (2021)
- 00's Rock Anthems (2021)
- A-List Boys (2019–2020)
- A-List Girls (2019–2020)
- Boy Bands vs. Girl Groups (2019-2020)
- Boys vs. Girls (2019-2021)
- Collabs (2020)
- Crazy in Love! 00's Love Songs (?–2021)
- Dance vs. Pop (2019)
- Duets (202–-2021)
- Fierce Girls of the 00's (2021)
- Especially for You (2019–2020)
- Love Songs (2019–2021)
- Party Classics (2019–2021)
- Party vs. Pop (2019–2020)
- Sing-A-Longs (2020)
- Sing-A-Longs of the 00's (2020–2021)
- Songs That Defined the 00's (2020–2021)
- Ultimate Showmen of All Time (2021)
- Ultimate Showwomen of All Time (2021)
- Ultimate Power Ballads (?–2021)

== Former programming ==
=== Music series ===
- 2-4-1 Hits (2017–2018)
- 90's Revolution (2011–2012)
- 90's vs. 80's (2012–2013)
- Aerobic (?–2012)
- The Album Chart Show
- Best of Charts
- Best of the Week
- Before the Weekend
- Boogie Night
- Celebrity Showdown
- Chill Out
- Class of 2000–2019 (2020–2021)
- Cover Power (?–2012)
- Expresso
- Feelgood Friday (2012–?)
- Flipside
- Final Countdown
- Huge Hits (2014–?)
- It Takes Two (2015–2017)
- Keep Calm & Wind Down (2014–?)
- Greatest Hits
- Late Night Love (2012–2017)
- Lazy Sunday Tunes (2015–2018)
- Love Is in the Air (?–2013–?)
- Music Never Felt So Good
- Music for the Masses
- Perfect Pop From the 00's (2015–?)
- Popstars (2018–2019)
- Pop up Videos
- Rise and Shine with VH1 (2012–2019)
- Saturday Night 80's Disco (2012–2013)
- Saturday Night Fever
- Saturday Soundtrack (2015–2018)
- Sing-Along of the Century (?–2019)
- Smells Like the 90's
- Smooth Wake Up
- So 80's
- Sunday Soul
- The Ultimate Movie Soundtracks (2015–?)
- Then & Now (2011–2014)
- This Week's VH1 Top 10 (2015–020)
- Top 10 (?–2012)
- Top 100 (2014–2016)
- Total Pop Party (2014–2017)
- VH1 Chill (2017–2018)
- VH1 Classic
- VH1 Club (2013–2014)
- VH1 Loves
- VH1 Music
- VH1 New
- VH1 Oldschool
- VH1 Pop Chart
- VH1 Rocks
- VH1 Superchart
- VH1 Themed
- Viva La Disco
- We Heart the: 90's (2014–2015)
- We Love the: 10's (2015–2020)
- Weekend Special
- Weekend Warm Up
- Wild 80's (2011–2012)

== See also ==
- MTV
- List of MTV channels
