= Mermaid Lounge =

Coordinates: 29.9408°N 90.0692°W

The Mermaid Lounge was a music club in New Orleans from 1993 to 2004. Local bands and out-of-town bands abounded, along with art shows and even an occasional flea market. According to the New Orleans Times-Picayune, it "personified the funky eclecticism of New Orleans nightlife."
