= Ernie K-Doe =

American R&B singer (1933–2001)

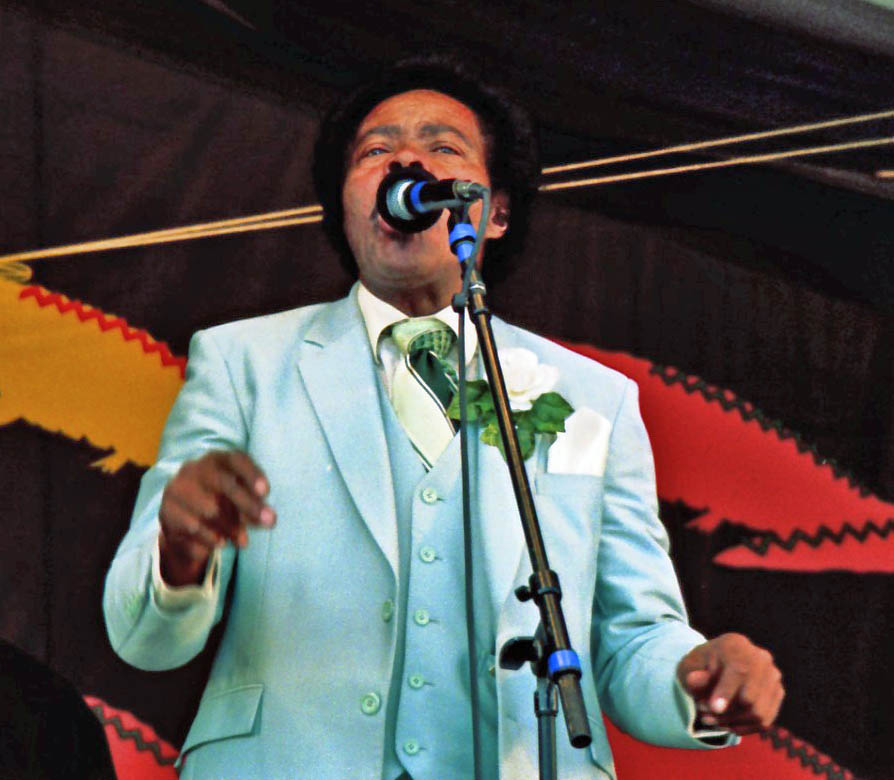
- K-Doe performing at the New Orleans Jazz & Heritage Festival, 1996

Background information
- Born: Ernest Kador Jr. February 22, 1933; New Orleans, Louisiana, U.S.
- Died: July 5, 2001 (aged 68) New Orleans, Louisiana, U.S.
- Genres: R&B
- Occupation: Singer
- Instrument: Vocals
- Years active: 1955–2001
- Labels: Specialty; Minit; London; Instant

Ernest Kador Jr. (February 22, 1933 – July 5, 2001), known by the stage name Ernie K-Doe, was an American R&B singer best known for his 1961 hit single "Mother-in-Law", which went to number 1 on the Billboard pop chart in the U.S.

== Early career ==
Born in New Orleans, K-Doe recorded as a member of the group the Blue Diamonds in 1954 before making his first solo recordings the following year. "Mother-in-Law", written by Allen Toussaint, was his first hit, reaching number 1 on both the Billboard pop chart and the Billboard R&B chart. In the UK, the song peaked at number 29. K-Doe never had another top-40 pop hit, but "Te-Ta-Te-Ta-Ta" (number 21, 1961) and "Later for Tomorrow" (number 37, 1967) both reached the R&B top 40.

== Later career ==
In the 1980s, K-Doe did radio shows on the New Orleans community stations WWOZ and WTUL. The shows were known for his explosively energetic announcements and frequent self-promotion (occasionally causing problems for the noncommercial station). K-Doe's catch phrases included "Burn, K-Doe, Burn!", "I'm a Charity Hospital Baby!" and (addressed to himself) "You just good, that's all!" For a time he billed himself as "Mister Naugahyde", until he was ordered to desist by the owners of the Naugahyde trademark. K-Doe then explained that it was a misunderstanding; he was actually referring to himself as "Mister M-Nauga-Ma-Hyde", a word he invented himself.

In the 1990s, K-Doe began billing himself as "The Emperor of the Universe" and, wearing a cape and crown, became a famous local eccentric in New Orleans. He continued performing and occasionally recording until shortly before his death. Always an elaborate showman, one of K-Doe's most notable later performances was at the Aquarium of the Americas, in New Orleans, where he performed at a benefit for a local group aiding people with disabilities. The show ended with K-Doe performing seven continuous renditions of "Mother In Law" while dancing in front of the Gulf of Mexico shark tank exhibit dressed in a green plumed cape.

Later recordings of note included "White Boy, Black Boy". While best known as a singer, he was also an accomplished drummer. The song "Here Come the Girls" was released in 1970 in the UK, but was not a hit. It was re-released in 2007 as a result of its use in an advertising campaign for Boots and reached number 43 in the UK Singles Chart.

== Death ==
K-Doe died on July 5, 2001 of kidney and liver failure from years of alcoholism. After a traditional jazz funeral, he was entombed in the 200-year-old Duval tomb in Saint Louis Cemetery Number 2, in his native New Orleans. He had burial space in his father's family cemetery in Erwinville, Louisiana, but his widow, Antoinette, as well as his fans and friends in New Orleans, wanted his remains in the city, so the Duval family offered him some of their tomb space. He is in the same tomb with his second mother-in-law, with whom he was very close, and his best friend, Earl King.

== Legacy ==
His widow, Antoinette K-Doe, continued to operate his music club and bar, Ernie K-Doe's Mother-in-Law Lounge, which housed a life-size statue of him. The club was severely damaged by Hurricane Katrina in late 2005 and had to shut down. With the help of the Hands on Network and the musical artist Usher Raymond, Antoinette reopened the Mother-in-Law Lounge on August 28, 2006, in its original location at 1500 N. Claiborne Avenue.

Antoinette also led a tongue-in-cheek campaign for K-Doe's election for mayor of hurricane-ravaged New Orleans in 2006, five years after his death. She is quoted as saying, "He's the only one qualified—that's my opinion." Although K-Doe's name did not appear on the ballot, the campaign generated revenue from sales of T-shirts and bumper stickers. Antoinette used the proceeds from these sales for rebuilding the Mother-in-Law Lounge and helping the New Orleans Musicians' Clinic, both of which were damaged by Hurricane Katrina.

In November 2007 the British-based high street beauty store and pharmacy Boots used his 1970 performance of the song "Here Come the Girls" as the soundtrack of a Christmas TV commercial. This led to the re-release of the song as single in the UK in December 2007. A new Boots commercial, with a summer theme, featuring the song was aired between June and August 2008 . The same song was also sampled on the Sugababes' single "Girls", which was then itself used in another Boots commercial in November 2008.

Antoinette died in New Orleans on February 24, 2009, Mardi Gras day, after a heart attack.

Ernie K-Doe was inducted into the Louisiana Music Hall of Fame in 2009.

== Charting Singles ==
| Single | Year | US | US R&B |
|---|---|---|---|
| "Mother-In-Law" | 1961 | 1 | 1 |
| "Te-Ta-Te-Ta-Ta" | 1961 | 53 | 21 |
| "I Cried My Last Tear" | 1961 | 69 | — |
| "A Certain Girl" | 1961 | 71 | — |
| "Popeye Joe" | 1962 | 99 | — |
| "Later for Tomorrow" | 1967 | — | 37 |
| "(It Will Have to Do) Until the Real Thing Comes Along" | 1967 | — | 48 |

== Discography ==
- Do, Baby Do / Eternity (as Ernest Kador) (Specialty 563) Nov 1955
- My Love For You / Tuff-Enuff (as Ernie Kado) (Ember 1050) Jan 1959
- Make You Love Me / There's A Will There's A Way (as K-Doe) (Minit 604) Nov 1959
- Hello My Lover / 'Taint It The Truth (Minit 614) Aug 1960
- Mother-In-Law / Wanted, $10,000.00 Reward (Minit 623) Jan 1961
- Te-Ta-Te-Ta-Ta / Real Man (Minit 627) May 1961
- My Love For You / Shirley's Tuff (Ember 1075) May 1961 re-release
- A Certain Girl / I Cried My Last Tear (Minit 634) Oct 1961
- Popeye Joe / Come On Home (Minit 641) Jan 1962
- Love You The Best / Hey, Hey, Hey (Minit 645) Apr 1962
- Beating Like A Tom Tom / I Got To Find Somebody (Minit 651) Jul 1962
- Get Out Of My House / Loving You (Minit 656) Oct 1962
- Be Sweet / Easier Said Than Done (Minit 661) Feb 1963
- I'm The Boss / Pennies Worth Of Happiness (Minit 665) May 1963
- Sufferin' So / Baby Since I Met You (Instant 3260) Sep 1963
- Talking Out Of My Head / Reaping What I Sow (Instant 3264) Apr 1964
- My Mother-In-Law (Is In My Hair Again) / Looking Into The Future (Duke 378) May 1964
- A Little Bit Of Everything / Someone (Duke 387) May 1965
- Boomerang / Please Don't Stop (Duke 400) Apr 1966
- Little Marie / Somebody Told Me (Duke 404) Jun 1966
- Later For Tomorrow / Dancin' Man (Duke 411) Feb 1967
- Don't Kill My Groove / Love Me Like I Wanta (Duke 420) Jun 1967
- (It Will Have To Do) Until The Real Thing Comes Along / Little Marie (Duke 423) Aug 1967
- Gotta Pack My Bag / How Sweet You Are (Duke 437) Aug 1968
- I'm Sorry / Trying To Make You Love Me (Duke 450) May 1969
- I'll Make Everything Be Alright / Wishing In Vain (Duke 456) Dec 1969
- Here Come The Girls / A Long Way Back From Home (Janus 167) Sep 1971
