= Studio B (group) =

British electronic music trio

- Origin: London, England
- Genres: Electronic
- Members: Harry Brooks; Simon Hulbert; Lewis Coleman

Studio B are a British electronic music trio consisting of Harry Brooks, Simon Hulbert and Lewis Coleman. The original version of their debut single, "I See Girls (Crazy)" featuring Romeo, made number 52 on the UK Singles Chart in December 2003. The track was then re-released in 2005 using a Tom Neville remix of the song, reaching number 12. The music video shows a man being chased by a group of girls reminiscent of a skit from the movie Monty Python's The Meaning of Life. In 2010, a thirty-second clip of the song was used in a commercial for Tide detergent with Acti-Lift.

The follow-up single "C'mon Get It On" was released in April 2006, featuring British singer Kelly Beckett who was later member of the girl group Paradiso Girls. Since 2006, Studio B have also worked with British singer Lisa Maffia on an album which was to be released April 2009, including writing the track "Bad Girl (At Night)", which reached number 4 on the UK Dance Chart.

== Discography ==
=== Singles ===
List of singles, with selected chart positions
Title	Year	Peak chart positions				
Title	Year	UK	AUS	FIN	FRA	NLD
"I See Girls (Crazy)" (featuring Romeo and Harry Brooks	2003	52	—	—	—	—
"I See Girls" (remix)	2005	12	43	7	76	41
"C'mon Get It On" (featuring Kelly Beckett)	2006	28	—	12	—	—
