= The Greatest Hits Tour (Sugababes) =

2007 concert tour by Sugababes

- Tour by Sugababes
- Location: Europe
- Associated album: Overloaded: The Singles Collection
- Start date: 27 March 2007
- End date: 13 April 2007 (United Kingdom and Ireland)
- No. of shows: 13 (United Kingdom and Ireland)

Sugababes concert chronology
- Taller in More Ways Tour (2006); The Greatest Hits Tour (2007); Change Tour (2008)

The Greatest Hits Tour (also known as Overloaded: The Singles Tour) was a 2007 arena concert tour by British girl group Sugababes. It supported their greatest hits album, Overloaded: The Singles Collection (2006). The tour began on 27 March 2007 in Dublin and the UK and Ireland leg of the tour concluded on 13 April 2007 at Wembley Arena in London. It marked the group's first time headlining a show at Wembley Arena. Following the UK and Ireland leg, the group performed several additional dates across mainland Europe.

== Background ==
The tour was announced shortly after the release of Overloaded: The Singles Collection, which compiled the group's singles from their first four studio albums. The arena tour began in the UK and Ireland in spring 2007, with 13 major shows, and was later extended with several additional dates across mainland Europe.

The Wembley Arena performance on 13 April 2007 was notable as it was the Sugababes’ first as headlining artists at the iconic venue. The tour was also an opportunity to showcase their lineup at the time—Keisha Buchanan, Heidi Range, and Amelle Berrabah—following several changes in membership since the group’s formation.

The tour featured a line of merchandise that was well received by fans. One of the most popular items was a T-shirt with the slogan "I'm the next Sugababe," a cheeky reference to the group's evolving lineup.

== Concert synopsis ==
The performances featured a mix of their most commercially successful singles, alongside less frequently performed tracks and covers. The show was segmented into different acts with wardrobe changes and choreographed sequences. According to reviews, the show was built around ubiquitous screen projections that accompanied nearly every song.

The show opened with the uptempo single "Red Dress," during which the group appeared on stage wearing matching silver tops and silver wraparound dark glasses. The show continued with hits like "In the Middle" and "Round Round", then "Overload" and "Run for Cover" from their debut album were performed. Mid-show, Sugababes performed a medley of their album tracks, including "Obsession", "Nasty Ghetto", and "Whatever Makes You Happy".

During the performance of "Stronger," the group projected footage from their Comic Relief trip to Africa, adding a humanitarian tone to the ballad. A costume change was timed to coincide with the screening of the Make Poverty History "three-second click" campaign film, integrating charitable messaging into the visual structure of the show.

The performance of a cover of Primal Scream's Rocks was cited in reviews as one of the highlights of the show, adding an element of surprise given the young age of most audience members on the tour.

"Easy" was performed with the band members posing in chairs, and for the encore, the group appeared wearing "Feel My Hits" T-shirts.

== Critical reception ==
The tour received largely positive reviews from critics.

In a positive review of the Wembley Arena show, Daily Mirror noted that the group appeared noticeably nervous during the opening number. However, by the time the second song began, the girls "had settled in", and the audience's enthusiasm "grew with each track". Beyond the expected highlights, the performance was praised for its surprises, including a "stunning, serious" rendition of "Stronger".

A mixed review from Phil Udell from Hot Press acknowledged that while the group had undergone significant lineup changes, the loss of a second original member had "proven to be not such a problem." The reviewer emphasized that, unlike many pop arena shows focused on spectacle, the Sugababes' concert prioritized musicality, stating that it was "more about substance than style." The group's catalogue was praised as "a cavalcade of some of the finest pop tunes to come our way this decade." Despite some reservations, the atmosphere was described as energetic and inclusive, with "the surreal sight of a huge number of under 10s jumping up and down to Primal Scream’s Rocks, and even typically disengaged parents joining in by the time of "Freak like Me."

Charles Hutchinson from York Press noted the acoustic performance of "Ugly" that "revealed personality" and the number for "Easy," which staging involved the use of chairs, that was likened to Christine Keeler's legendary photo series. However, Hutchinson remarked that "the street rough edges have long left Sugababes," noting that the group had transitioned toward a more polished and conventional live act. The review described the performance as a "standard arena pop performance," suggesting a shift away from the edgier image the group had earlier in their career.

Ben Rawson-Jones from Digital Spy gave a particularly enthusiastic review of the group’s Wembley Arena show. The reviewer highlighted how the band members "exuded professionalism" and performance of “Too Lost in You” was described as a “spine-tingling moment.” The group was praised for their strong vocals and effortless transitions between songs. Despite lineup changes in previous years, they were commended for their on-stage unity and consistent quality throughout the show. Rawson-Jones also rated Sugababes above other pop acts, noting that the trio had "evolved beyond the manufactured pop band tag" and delivered a performance that was both vocally strong and emotionally resonant. The review emphasized that their combination of chart-topping hits, confident stage presence, and musical versatility distinguished them from many of their contemporaries in the pop landscape.

== Controversies ==
Journalists noted certain T-shirts sold at the shows that displayed the names of former Sugababes members crossed out. These were interpreted by media as shade toward ex-members and drew criticism from fans who saw the message as unnecessarily dismissive.

== Set list ==
This set list is from the April 13, 2007, concert in London. It is not intended to represent all concerts for the tour.

- 01."Red Dress"
- 02."In the Middle"
- 03."Round Round"
- 04."Overload"
- 05."Run for Cover"
- 06."Caught in a Moment"
- 07.Medley: "Obsession" / "Nasty Ghetto" / "Whatever Makes You Happy"
- 08."Stronger"
- 09."Walk This Way"
- 10."Too Lost in You"
- 11."Ugly" (Acoustic Version)
- 12."Breathe Easy" (Acoustic Version)
- 13."Rocks"
- 14."Easy" (Contains Snippet of "Maneater")
- 15."Freak Like Me"

Encore

- 16."Hole in the Head"
- 17."Push the Button"

== Tour dates ==
=== United Kingdom and Ireland ===
The main leg of the tour.

Date	City	Country	Venue
27 March 2007	Dublin	Ireland	The Point
28 March 2007	Belfast	Northern Ireland	Waterfront Hall
30 March 2007	Birmingham	England	National Exhibition Centre
31 March 2007	Manchester	England	Manchester Arena
1 April 2007	Nottingham	England	Motorpoint Arena Nottingham
3 April 2007	Bournemouth	England	Bournemouth International Centre
4 April 2007	Plymouth	England	Plymouth Pavilions
6 April 2007	Cardiff	England	Cardiff Arena
7 April 2007	Sheffield	England	Sheffield Arena
9 April 2007	Glasgow	Scotland	Scottish Exhibition and Conference Centre
10 April 2007	Newcastle	England	Metro Radio Arena
12 April 2007	Brighton	England	Brighton Centre
13 April 2007	London	England	Wembley Arena

=== Additional shows ===
Additional shows across mainland Europe. The list of cities is not complete.

Date	City	Country	Venue
20 April 2007	Berlin	Germany	Columbiahalle
21 April 2007	Cologne	Germany	Palladium
