= Three Tour =

- UK tour by Sugababes
- Associated album: Three
- Start date: 19 March 2004
- End date: 2 April 2004
- Legs: 1
- No. of shows: 12

Sugababes concert chronology
- Angels with Dirty Faces Tour (2003); Three Tour (2004); Taller in More Ways Tour (2006)

The Three Tour is the second concert tour by English girl group Sugababes. Launched in support of their third studio album, Three (2003), it began 19 March 2004 in Brighton and 2 April 2004 in London.

== Critical reception ==
Alexis Petridis from The Guardian rated the tour's debut show on 19 March 2004 in Brighton two ouf of five stars. He called it an "oddly flat show" and wrote: "It's all bland smiles up there, which does not fit with the feistiness of the material [...] The trio appear oddly characterless, even when half-heartedly fondling a volunteer during 'Nasty Ghetto'. Their banter would render a hyperactive child comatose."

== Set list ==
This set list is representative of the 27 March 2004 show in Manchester.

1. "Round Round"
2. "Freak like Me"
3. "Overload"
4. "Whatever Makes You Happy"
5. "Run for Cover"
6. "Million Different Ways"
7. "Virgin Sexy"
8. "Angels with Dirty Faces"
9. "Caught in a Moment"
10. "Stronger"
11. "Shape"
12. "Breathe Easy"
13. "Conversation's Over"
14. "Buster"
15. "U Should've Known Better" (Monica cover) (Mutya Buena solo)
16. "I Found Lovin'" (Fatback Band cover) (Keisha Buchanan solo)
17. "Wonderful" (Heidi Range solo)
18. "Too Lost in You"
19. "In the Middle"
20. "Hole in the Head"

== Tour dates ==
List of concerts
Date	City	Country	Venue
19 March 2004	Brighton	England	Brighton Centre
20 March 2004	Bournemouth	England	Bournemouth International Centre
21 March 2004	Plymouth	England	Plymouth Pavilions
23 March 2004	Cardiff	England	Cardiff Arena
24 March 2004	Suffolk	England	Ipswich Regent Theatre
26 March 2004	Birmingham	England	Birmingham NIA
27 March 2004	Manchester	England	Manchester Apollo
28 March 2004	Glasgow	Scotland	Glasgow Academy
30 March 2004	Newcastle	England	Newcastle City Hall
31 March 2004	Sheffield	England	Sheffield City Hall
2 April 2004	London	England	Hammersmith Apollo

== Cancelled shows ==
On 6 March 2004, the band was forced to pull out of their Dublin show due to acute laryngitis.

List of cancelled concerts
Date	City	Country	Venue
6 March 2004	Dublin	Ireland	Olympia Theatre
