= Overloaded: The Singles Collection =

2006 compilation album by Sugababes

Greatest hits album by Sugababes
- Released: 10 November 2006
- Recorded: 2000–2006
- Genres: Pop; R&B
- Length: 58:13
- Label: Island
- Producers: Richard X; Brian Higgins; Tim Powell; Xenomania; Jeremy Wheatley; Jony Rockstar; Pete Craigie; Cameron McVey; Brio Taliaferro; Jason Pebworth; George Astasio; Dallas Austin; Rob Dougan; Andy Bradfield; Paul Simm

Sugababes chronology
Taller in More Ways (2005)	Overloaded: The Singles Collection (2006)	Change (2007)

Singles from Overloaded: The Singles Collection
- 1. "Easy" Released: 6 November 2006

Overloaded: The Singles Collection is the first greatest hits album of British girl group Sugababes. It was released on 10 November 2006—almost one year following the departure of founding member Mutya Buena and the introduction of her replacement, Amelle Berrabah. Overloaded features twelve of the group's singles, four of which reached number one in the UK; "Freak like Me", "Round Round", "Hole in the Head", and "Push the Button". The Sugababes collaborated with members from Orson to produce two new tracks for the album, "Easy" and "Good to Be Gone". Overloaded received positive reviews from critics, who generally praised it as a reflection of the group's success.

The album peaked at number three on the UK Albums Chart and was certified two-times platinum by the British Phonographic Industry (BPI). By October 2008, it had sold 600,000 copies in the UK. Overloaded also reached the top twenty on the record charts of Ireland and Portugal, and the top forty on the charts in Austria, Denmark, Germany, the Netherlands, Norway and Switzerland. Its lead single "Easy" was released one week prior to the album's release, and reached the top ten on the singles charts of Slovakia and the United Kingdom. To promote Overloaded, the Sugababes performed at the 100 Club in London and embarked on the album's accompanying tour in the UK and Ireland from March to April 2007.

== Background ==
Shortly following the release of the Sugababes' fourth studio album, Taller in More Ways, it was announced in December 2005 that founding group member Mutya Buena had left the band. Two singles were subsequently released from the album featuring new group member Amelle Berrabah, who was announced as Buena's replacement 24 hours after her departure. In June 2006, the Sugababes began working on their fifth studio album which was confirmed for release in 2007. However, group member Heidi Range also revealed that a greatest hits album would be released in time for Christmas 2006, which would include all of the group's hits. When rumours arose that the release of the album was premature, band member Keisha Buchanan stated that the group had already started to plan a greatest hits album. She explained how it was essential for the album to be released following Buena's departure, saying: "When Mutya left, we decided it was even more important, we should do this as closure so we don't have to relive history all the time." Range also reflected upon this, saying: "When Mutya was still in the band the greatest hits was always planned for this time anyway. But when she left it seemed even more appropriate."

== Release and content ==
"This is a chance to prove people wrong because this is the second line-up change and when we've had line-up changes people have had their opinions on how long we'll last. With Mutya leaving, we've heard about us not being able to go on. But we know we enjoy performing live and Amelle has a fantastic voice. So long as the fans like us and we enjoy it, we'll be able to carry on. It's nice to be able to prove people wrong."

— Keisha Buchanan speaking to Daily Record in regard to the line-up change.

Overloaded was released in the UK on 13 November 2006. In addition, a remix album titled Overloaded: The Remix Collection and a greatest hits DVD, Overloaded: The Videos Collection were released on the same day. Overloaded was not released in the United States, despite being reported that it would be available in the country on 5 December 2006. According to Dorian Lynskey of The Guardian, the group looks "positively regal" on the album cover. The album contains twelve of the group's previous singles, four of which reached number one in the UK: "Freak Like Me", "Round Round", "Hole in the Head" and "Push the Button".

The Sugababes collaborated with members from Orson to produce two brand new tracks for the album, "Easy" and "Good to Be Gone". Buchanan spoke upon the collaboration, saying: "When we started working with the Orson guys the sound just blew us away – it's so fresh, but has the same qualities as the biggest songs of our career. It's perfect for this album." Range, however, explained how she initially did not like "Easy" in comparison to "Good to Be Gone". After leaving the studio, she called the other members of the group and spoke of her dissatisfaction with it. Range realised she enjoyed the song after listening to it the following day, and later named it one of her favourite songs by the group. Despite being titled The Singles Collection, the album does not contain all of the group's previous singles; "New Year", "Soul Sound", "Angels with Dirty Faces" and "Follow Me Home" are omitted, although "Run for Cover" is included as a bonus track on the UK version. The re-recorded version of "Red Dress" with Berrabah instead of Buena was included on the compilation following the latter's departure from the group.

== Reception ==
=== Critical response ===
Professional ratings
Review scores
Source	Rating
AllMusic	4.5/5 stars
Daily Record	5/5 stars
This Is Fake DIY	8/10
The Guardian	4/5 stars
Herald Sun	4/5 stars
musicOMH	5/5 stars
Pitchfork	8.5/10

Overloaded received positive reviews from critics, who praised the album as a reflection of the group's success. Andy Kellman of AllMusic rated the album four and a half stars out of five. He praised the tracks as "an ideal introduction" to the Sugababes, and noted that the new songs recorded with Berrabah "indicate that the group hasn't lost any of its momentum". Daily Record writer Rick Fulton gave the album a full five-star rating, saying: "Changing members can't dampen the winning formula of Sugababes – sassy vocals over electro beats". He concluded that Overloaded proves the group as the UK's best. Dorian Lynskey of The Guardian gave the album a four out of five star rating and wrote that the group's longevity "practically makes them the Status Quo of the genre".

The Herald Sun's Cameron Adams noted that Overloaded is a reminder of "what a good pop act" the Sugababes are, although he was less favourable of the new tracks. Stuart McCaighy of This Is Fake DIY concluded that Overloaded is "awash with hits" and is indicative of why the group was named the most successful female act of the 21st century. Tim Fenney from Pitchfork Media rated Overloaded eight and a half out of ten; he praised the more emotional tracks on the album, writing: "While people may remember the group for their frothy pop, their greatest hits collection Overloaded is equally impressive for its devastatingly earnest balladry". Gigwise's Jenna Churchley-Burton described the album as "pure pop perfection at its very best".

=== Commercial performance ===
Overloaded became a commercial success in the UK. It debuted and peaked at number three on the UK Albums Chart, selling 57,284 copies in its first week of release, becoming the Sugababes' fourth consecutive top three album. The following week, it dropped to number eight on sales of 45,991. In its third week on the chart, Overloaded dropped seven places to number 15, although rebounded to number 11 in its fourth week on sales of 66,956. Overloaded was certified Platinum by the British Phonographic Industry, denoting shipments of 300,000 copies. By October 2007, the album had sold approximately 500,000 copies in the UK alone. In October 2008, Music Week confirmed that the album had sold close to 600,000 copies in the UK. Overloaded debuted and peaked at number 12 on the Irish Albums Chart 16 November 2006. It was later certified Platinum by the Irish Recorded Music Association, denoting shipments of 15,000 copies.

Overloaded also achieved commercial success in various other countries. It debuted on the Portuguese Albums Chart at number 28 and peaked at number 15 two weeks later, becoming the group's only record to chart in Portugal. The album entered the Norwegian Albums Chart at number 40 and reached number 21 two weeks later. Overloaded debuted at number 35 on the Austrian Albums Chart on 24 November 2006 and reached its peak position of number 25 on 8 December 2006. It spent nine weeks on the chart. The album debuted and peaked at number 29 on the Swiss Albums Chart and lasted nine weeks on the chart. Overloaded reached number 37 on the Dutch Mega Album Top 100 chart, number 38 on the German Albums Chart, and number 43 on the Belgium (Flanders) Ultratop chart. Overloaded peaked at number 34 on the Danish Albums Chart on 24 November 2006 and was certified Gold by the International Federation of the Phonographic Industry, indicating shipments of 20,000 copies.

== Promotion ==
=== Singles ===
"Easy" was released on 6 November 2006 as the lead single from Overloaded, one week prior to the album's release. The song was written by Jason Pebworth and George Astasio in collaboration with the group's members—Buchanan, Range and Berrabah. It was produced by Pebworth, Astasio and Brio Taliaferro. This Is Fake DIY's Stuart McCaighy commended the song's production and seductive lyrics. "Easy" went top ten in Slovakia and the UK, and reached the top forty in almost every other country it charted in. "Good to Be Gone" was due to be released as the second and final single from the album in early 2007, although this was soon cancelled after the Sugababes collaborated with fellow girl group Girls Aloud on the Comic Relief single, "Walk This Way". The song went to number one in the UK.

=== Album launch and tour ===
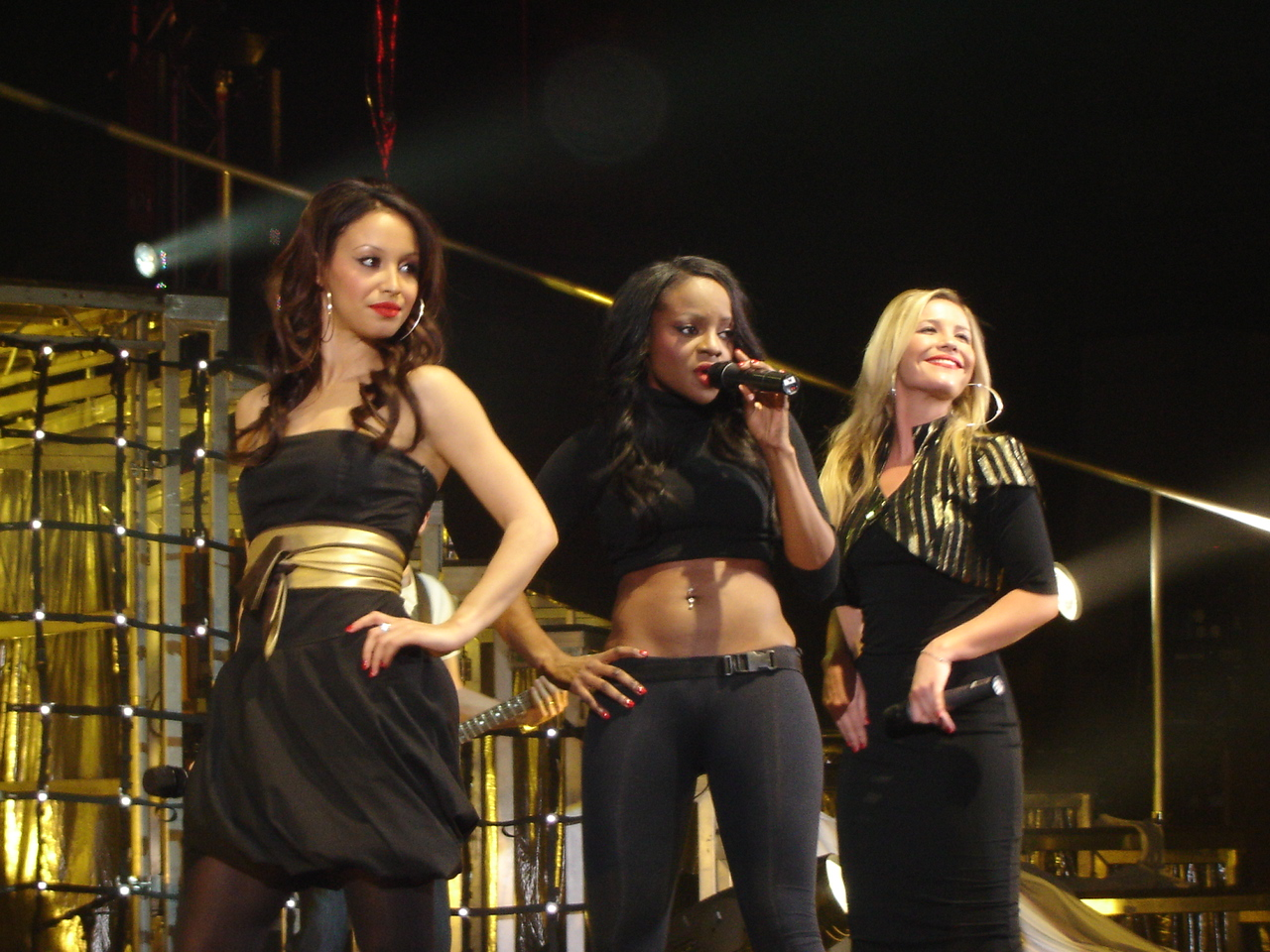
The Sugababes performing on the Overloaded tour.

The album launch for Overloaded was held on 3 October 2006 at the 100 Club on Oxford Street, London. The 80-minute show experienced a power cut and technicians were called to the scene, in which the performance resumed one hour later. Backed by a live band, every track featured on the album was performed (except "Good To Be Gone" and "Shape"). Betty Clarke of The Guardian gave the performance a three out of five star rating, describing them "as glossy as thoroughbreds, styled like Topshop mannequins", although acknowledging, "when the singing stops, the cracks appear". A journalist for MTV UK wrote, "Looking fab but not over-styled in skinny jeans, the girls still have the unpolished edge we love 'em for".

In November 2006, the Sugababes announced that they would embark on a tour in 2007 to promote Overloaded. The Greatest Hits Tour comprised 13 show dates in the UK and Ireland, starting from 27 March 2007 in Dublin Point, and ending at the London Wembley Arena on 13 April 2007, the latter of which was their first headline performance. Amongst the cities they visited included Manchester, Sheffield and Nottingham. The tour also featured a merchandise stall that sold T-shirts with the slogan "I'm the Next Sugababe". A journalist for Daily Mirror wrote: "From the still-brilliant 'Overload' to the tender 'Too Lost in You', the hits kept on coming as the crowd screeched louder with every song." During the tour, the Sugababes performed a cover version of "Rocks" by Scottish alternative rock band, Primal Scream.

Tour Setlist
- 01."Red Dress"
- 02."In the Middle"
- 03."Round Round"
- 04."Overload"
- 05."Run for Cover"
- 06."Caught in a Moment"
- 07.Medley: "Obsession" / "Nasty Ghetto" / "Whatever Makes You Happy"
- 08."Stronger"
- 09."Walk This Way"
- 10."Too Lost in You"
- 11."Ugly" (Acoustic Version)
- 12."Breathe Easy" (Acoustic Version)
- 13."Rocks"
- 14."Easy" (Contains Snippet of "Maneater")
- 15."Freak Like Me"

Encore

- 16."Hole in the Head"
- 17."Push the Button"

== Track listing ==
Overloaded: The Singles Collection
No.	Title	Writer(s)	Producer(s)	Length
1.	"Freak Like Me" (from Angels with Dirty Faces, 2002^{1})	Eugene Hanes; Marc Valentine; Loren Hill; William Collins; George Clinton; Gary Numan	Richard X	3:15
2.	"Round Round" (from Angels with Dirty Faces^{1})	Brian Higgins; Miranda Cooper; Lisa Cowling; Nick Coler; Keisha Buchanan; Mutya Buena; Heidi Range; Florian Pflueger; Felix Stecher; Robin Hofmann; Rino Spadavecchia; Richard Baxter (uncredited); Jerry Ross (uncredited)	Kevin Bacon; Jonathan Quarmby	3:57
3.	"Red Dress" (from Taller in More Ways, 2005^{2})	Buchanan; Buena; Range; Higgins; Cooper; Tim Powell; Coler; Shawn Lee; Cowling; Bob Bradley	Higgins; Xenomania	3:38
4.	"In the Middle" (from Three, 2003^{1})	Cooper; Higgins; Niara Scarlett; Lee; Cowling; Buchanan; Buena; Range; Andre Tegler; Phil Fuldner; Michael Bellina	Higgins; Xenomania; Jeremy Wheatley	3:55
5.	"Stronger" (from Angels with Dirty Faces^{1})	Jony Lipsey; Marius de Vries; Felix Howard; Buchanan; Buena; Range	Jony Rockstar	4:04
6.	"Shape" (from Angels with Dirty Faces^{1})	Sting; Dominic Miller; Pete Craigie	Craigie	4:12
7.	"Overload" (from One Touch, 2000^{3})	Buchanan; Buena; Siobhán Donaghy; Howard; Cameron McVey; Paul Simm; Lipsey	McVey; Rockstar; Simm	4:38
8.	"Good to Be Gone" (previously unreleased, 2006^{2})	Jason Pebworth; George Astasio; Buchanan; Range; Amelle Berrabah	Brio Taliaferro; Pebworth; Astasio	3:27
9.	"Caught in a Moment" (from Three^{1})	Lipsey; Karen Poole; de Vries; Buchanan; Buena; Range	Rockstar	4:26
10.	"Ugly" (from Taller in More Ways^{1})	Dallas Austin	Austin	3:51
11.	"Easy" (previously unreleased, 2006^{2})	Pebworth; Astasio; Buchanan; Range; Berrabah	Taliaferro; Pebworth; Astasio	3:39
12.	"Too Lost in You" (from Three^{1})	Diane Warren	Andy Bradfield; Rob Dougan	4:00
13.	"Run for Cover" (UK bonus track) (from One Touch^{3})	Lipsey; Simm; McVey; Donaghy; Buchanan; Buena	McVey; Rockstar; Simm	3:47
14.	"Hole in the Head" (from Three^{1})	Higgins; Range; Buchanan; Cooper; Buena; Scarlett; Coler; Powell	Higgins; Xenomania; Wheatley	3:39
15.	"Push the Button" (from Taller in More Ways^{1})	Buchanan; Buena; Range; Austin	Austin	3:38

Overloaded: The Singles Collection – UK digital bonus track
No.	Title	Writer(s)	Producer(s)	Length
16.	"I Bet You Look Good on the Dancefloor" (B-side to "Red Dress" single^{2})	Alex Turner	Jim Abbiss; Alan Smyth	2:47

Notes

1. includes vocals of Mutya Buena
2. includes vocals of Amelle Berrabah
3. includes vocals of Siobhan Donaghy

=== Digital and deluxe edition versions ===
Overloaded: The Videos Collection (DVD)

#	Title	Time
1.	"Freak Like Me"	3:46
2.	"Round Round"	3:57
3.	"Red Dress"	3:36
4.	"In the Middle"	3:41
5.	"Stronger"	4:00
6.	"Shape"	3:15
7.	"Overload"	4:18
8.	"Caught in a Moment"	3:49
9.	"Ugly"	3:35
10.	"Easy"	3:36
11.	"Too Lost in You"	3:58
12.	"Run for Cover"	3:47
13.	"Hole in the Head"	3:38
14.	"Push the Button"	3:37

Overloaded: The Remix Collection (Digital download)

#	Title	Time
1.	"Freak like Me" [Different Gear mix]	8:13
2.	"Round Round" [M.A.N.D.Y. radio mix]	3:56
3.	"Red Dress" [Dennis Christopher vocal mix]	7:16
4.	"In the Middle" [Gravitas 3am vocal mix]	8:56
5.	"Stronger" [Almighty club mix]	8:00
6.	"Shape" [D-Bop's Vocal Breakdown mix]	7:38
7.	"Overload" [Nick Faber mix]	6:50
8.	"Caught in a Moment" [D-Bop remix]	5:30
9.	"Ugly" [Suga Shaker vocal mix]	5:44
10.	"Easy" [Seamus Haji & Paul Emanuel remix]	7:31
11.	"Too Lost in You" [Kujay DaDa's Bass Shaker mix]	6:41
12.	"Run for Cover" [G4orce All Things Nice Dub]	4:29
13.	"Hole in the Head" [full Intention vocal mix]	7:13
14.	"Push the Button" [DJ Prom remix]	8:13

Deluxe edition (Digital download)

#	Title	Time
1.	"Freak like Me" [Maida Vale Session]	3:51
2.	"Round Round" [Sessions @ AOL]	4:55
3.	"Red Dress" [live at V Festival 2006]	3:49
4.	"In the Middle" [Sessions @ AOL]	4:17
5.	"Stronger" [Sessions @ AOL]	4:22
6.	"Shape" [live version]	4:15
7.	"Overload" [Maida Vale Session]	4:28
8.	"Caught in a Moment" [live at London]	4:40
9.	"Ugly" [acoustic version]	3:49
10.	"Too Lost in You" [Sessions @ AOL]	4:19
11.	"Hole in the Head" [Sessions @ AOL]	3:33
12.	"Push the Button" [live at London]	3:42

== Personnel ==
Credits adapted from AllMusic.

=== Sugababes ===
- Keisha Buchanan – vocals
- Mutya Buena – vocals
- Heidi Range – vocals
- Amelle Berrabah – vocals
- Siobhán Donaghy – vocals

=== Other musicians ===
- Dallas Austin – drums, keyboards
- Sophie Barber – violin
- Fenella Barton – violin
- Simon Benson – guitar (bass)
- Mark Berrow – violin
- Rachel Bolt – viola
- Thomas Bowes – violin
- Bobby Bradley – bass
- Martin Burgess – violin
- Nick Coler – guitar, guitar (bass)
- Nick Cooper – cello
- Marcia Crayford – orchestra leader, violin
- Dermot Crehan – violin
- Caroline Dale – cello
- David Jack Daniels – cello
- Marius de Vries – bass
- Caroline Dearney – cello
- Manon Derome – violin
- Rob Dougan – orchestral arrangements, piano, producer, string arrangements
- Philip Dukes – viola
- Liz Edwards – violin
- Chris Elliot – string arrangements
- Chris Elliott – cello, piano
- Guy Farley – string arrangements, string conductor
- Simon Fischer – violin
- Timothy Grant – viola
- Jack Guy – engineer
- Peter G. Hanson – violin
- Brian Higgins – guitar (bass), keyboards
- Rebecca Hirsch – violin
- Philippe Honoré – violin
- Lynda Houghton – double bass
- Felix Howard – guitar (rhythm)
- Nick Ingman – conductor, orchestral arrangements, string arrangements
- David Juritz – violin
- Alison Kelly – violin
- Kick Horns – horn
- Patrick Kiernan – violin
- Darrell Kok – violin
- Boguslaw Kostecki – violin
- Zoe Lake – viola
- Peter Lale – viola
- Patrick Lannigan – double bass
- Tim "Rolf" Larcombe – keyboards
- Julian Leaper – violin
- Shawn Lee – guitar
- Gaby Lester – violin
- Anthony Lewis – cello
- Peter Lockett – percussion
- Douglas Mackie – violin
- Steve Mair – double bass
- Perry Mason – violin
- Donald McVay – viola
- Cameron McVey – keyboards
- Steve Morris – violin
- Everton Nelson – violin
- Yoad Nevo – guitar, instrumentation, keyboards
- Melissa Phelps – cello
- Richard Phillips – keyboards
- Tim Powell – keyboards
- Tony Reyes – guitar, guitar (bass)
- Nick Roberts – cello
- Jony Rockstar – bass, beats, drums, keyboards
- Frank Schaefer – cello
- Mary Scully – double bass
- Dominic Seldis – double bass
- Jackie Shave – violin
- Jon Shave – keyboards, vocals
- Katherine Shave – violin
- Celia Sheen – violin
- Mark Sheridan – guitar
- Paul Simm – keyboards
- Simon Masterton Smith – violin
- Ralph de Souza – violin
- Michael Stirling – cello
- Chris Tombling – violin
- Chris Watson – guitar
- Ivo Jan van der Werff – viola
- Bruce White – viola
- Jonathan Williams – cello
- Steve "Syco Steve" Williams – double bass
- David Woodcock – violin
- Gavyn Wright – violin
- Naomi Wright – cello
- Warren Zielinski – violin

=== Technical ===
- George Astasio – producer
- Dallas Austin – producer
- Goetz B. – mixing
- Dean Barratt – programming
- Michael Bellina – producer
- Andy Bradfield – mixing, producer
- Nick Coler – programming
- Pete Craigie – engineer, producer, vocal engineer
- Dario Dendi – engineer, vocal engineer
- Matt Duguid – programming
- Richard Edgeler – assistant, mixing assistant
- Tom Elmhirst – engineer, mixing, programming, vocal engineer
- Phil Fuldner – producer
- Ben Georgiades – vocal engineer, vocal recording
- Doug Harms – assistant engineer
- Brian Higgins – producer, programming
- Khris Kellow – vocal producer
- Tim "Rolf" Larcombe – programming
- Mario Lucy – vocal engineer
- Graham Marsh – assistant engineer
- Cameron McVey – producer, programming
- Yoad Nevo – producer, programming
- Chris Parmenidis – mastering
- Jason Pebworth – producer
- Tim Powell – mixing, producer, programming
- Jonathan Quarmby – producer
- Jony Rockstar – mixing, producer
- Ian Rossiter – assistant engineer
- Mike Ross-Trevor – string engineer
- Rick Sheppard – engineer, MIDI, MIDI design, sound design
- Paul Simm – producer
- Zoe Smith – assistant, assistant engineer
- Brio Taliaferro – producer
- Diane Warren – executive producer
- Jeremy Wheatley – mixing, producer, programming
- Richard Wilkinson – engineer
- Richard X – producer

== Charts ==
=== Weekly charts ===
Chart (2006)	Peak position
Australian Albums (ARIA)	110
Austrian Albums (Ö3 Austria)	25
Belgian Albums (Ultratop Flanders)	43
Danish Albums (Tracklisten)	34
Dutch Albums (MegaCharts)	37
European Albums (Billboard)	8
German Albums (GfK Entertainment)	38
Irish Albums (IRMA)	12
Norwegian Albums (VG-lista)	21
Portuguese Albums (AFP)	15
Swiss Albums (Swiss Hitparade)	29
UK Albums (OCC)	3
UK R&B Albums (OCC)	2

=== Year-end charts ===
Chart (2006)	Position
UK Albums (OCC)	41
Chart (2007)	Position
UK Albums (OCC)	108

== Certifications ==
Region	Certification	Certified units/sales
Denmark (IFPI Danmark)	Gold	20,000^{^}
Ireland (IRMA)	Platinum	15,000^{^}
Portugal (AFP)	Gold	10,000^{^}
United Kingdom (BPI)	2× Platinum	600,000^{^}
^{^} Shipments figures based on certification alone.

== Release history ==
Country	Date	Format	Label
Australia	10 November 2006	Digital download	Universal Island
Austria	10 November 2006	Digital download	Universal Island
Czech Republic	10 November 2006	Digital download	Universal Island
Denmark	10 November 2006	Digital download	Universal Island
Finland	10 November 2006	Digital download	Universal Island
France	10 November 2006	Digital download	Universal Island
Germany	10 November 2006	Digital download	Universal Island
Greece	10 November 2006	Digital download	Universal Island
Ireland	10 November 2006	Digital download	Universal Island
Italy	10 November 2006	Digital download	Universal Island
New Zealand	10 November 2006	Digital download	Universal Island
Norway	10 November 2006	Digital download	Universal Island
Poland	10 November 2006	Digital download	Universal Island
United Kingdom	10 November 2006	Digital download	Universal Island
United Kingdom	13 November 2006	Audio CD	Island
Germany	13 November 2006	Audio CD	Island
Australia	24 November 2006	Audio CD	Universal Music
France	5 December 2006	Audio CD	Universal Music
