= Three (Sugababes album) =

2003 studio album by Sugababes

Studio album by Sugababes
- Released: 27 October 2003
- Recorded: December 2002 – March 2003
- Genres: Dance-pop; hip hop; R&B
- Length: 55:15
- Label: Island
- Producers: Andy Bradfield; Craigie; Rob Dougan; Brian Higgins; Linda Perry; Jony Rockstar; Guy Sigsworth; Jeremy Wheatley; Xenomania

Sugababes chronology
Angels with Dirty Faces (2002)	Three (2003)	Taller in More Ways (2005)

Singles from Three
- 1. "Hole in the Head" Released: 13 October 2003; 2. "Too Lost in You" Released: 15 December 2003; 3. "In the Middle" Released: 22 March 2004; 4. "Caught in a Moment" Released: 23 August 2004

Three is the third studio album by British girl group Sugababes. It was released by Island Records on 27 October 2003 in the United Kingdom. Recorded between December 2002 and March 2003, band members Mutya Buena, Keisha Buchanan, and Heidi Range reteamed with Jony Rockstar and Xenomania to work on material for the album, with Jonny Dollar, Craig "Craigie" Dodds and Guy Sigsworth also becoming instrumental in producing the album. The trio also traveled to the United States to work with Linda Perry and Diane Warren.

Three received generally positive reviews from critics, who praised its fresh urban and hip hop influences, confident production, and musical maturity, though some noted a lack of standout originality. The album debuted and peaked at number three on the UK Albums Chart and was certified double platinum by the British Phonographic Industry (BPI) just two months after its release. Elsewhere, Three also reached the top ten in Germany, Ireland, the Netherlands, and Switzerland.

The album generated four singles that charted in various parts of the world. Lead single "Hole in the Head" became the group's third UK number one single and marked the Sugababes' first release to top the US Dance Club Play chart. Follow-up "Too Lost in You" became a top ten success in the Netherlands, Norway, Switzerland and the United Kingdom, while "In the Middle" and "Caught in a Moment" both peaked at number eight on the UK Singles Chart. In further promotion of the album, Sugababes embarked on the Three Tour from March to April 2004.

== Background ==
After releasing "Shape", the fourth and final single from their successful previous album Angels with Dirty Faces (2002), the group announced that they had gone back into the studio to start work on the next album with producers whom they worked with on the previous album such as Jony Rockstar and Xenomania. They went over to America to work with producers such as Linda Perry and Diane Warren, who wrote the ballad "Too Lost in You". They had also aimed to promote the new album in America. The girls co-wrote and recorded their own tracks on the new album—Keisha's being "Whatever Makes You Happy", Heidi's being "Sometimes", and Mutya's being "Maya", a song about her sister who died unexpectedly. The Sugababes later announced the lead single "Hole in the Head" and its release date of 13 October. The UK release was a special edition with two extra tracks, "Twisted" and "Buster". Initially, the digital download version offered by Woolworths in the UK accidentally contained an earlier demo version of "Whatever Makes You Happy" but the mistake was quickly rectified. On streaming services, an alternative version of "Whatever Makes You Happy" has replaced the original album version.

== Promotion ==
The first single, "Hole in the Head", was the group's third number-one single in the United Kingdom and also went to number one in Denmark. It reached number two in Ireland and Norway, and the top forty in Australia. The second single, "Too Lost in You", reached the top ten in the UK and Norway, and the top forty in Australia. The third single, "In the Middle", went top ten in the UK, top twenty in Ireland and top forty in Europe and Australia. A fourth single, "Caught in a Moment", also reached the top ten in the UK. In 2004, "Hole in the Head" was serviced to radio in the United States and became a top forty hit on pop radio. Following the moderate success of the single, Three was due for release in the US on 22 June 2004 with an altered track listing featuring singles from the group's previous album, Angels with Dirty Faces (2002). The release was subsequently cancelled. From March to April 2004, the band went on the Three Tour. The concert tour's debut show at the Olympia Theatre in Dublin was cancelled just ten minutes before they were due to step onstage due to two band members having acute laryngitis.

== Critical reception ==
Professional ratings
Review scores
Source	Rating
AllMusic	4/5 stars
Evening Standard	2/3 marks
The Guardian	3/5 stars
The Independent	2/5 stars
MTV Asia	6/10
Rolling Stone	3/5 stars
RTÉ	4/5 stars
Stylus	B+
Yahoo! Music	8/10

Three received positive reviews from critics, who praised the experimental new urban and hip hop sounds on the album. Alan Braidwood from the BBC gave Three a positive review, stating the album takes lead from Angels with Dirty Faces and calling it a "fresh and exciting album." He also praised the new sound on the album. Ross Hoffman from AllMusic rated the album four out of five stars and described it as "tuneful, R&B-inflected dance-pop with fresh-sounding but accessible productions, along with a healthy smattering of big droopy ballads with an expanded stylistic range." Yahoo! Music's Dan Gennoe remarked that "while by pop standards their third album is another brave challenge, by their own it's a safe banker. With the playing field already slanted to their liking, it's a tour round the Sugababes' bases to consolidate their strengths and bolster their reputation as a byword for sophistication. As such, it's both their most accomplished album to date and their least exceptional."

Stylus editor Nick Southall found that Three was "almost ridiculously assured, confident and unified. If there were a couple of faltering steps on Angels they’ve been eradicated here." He concluded that "it seems trite to refer to Sugababes as sassy or streetwise or sophisticated because that’s what everybody says. The problem is that it’s true. It’s not a difficult truth to live with; Three is a stunner." Dorian Lynskey from The Guardian gave the album three stars out of five. He felt that Three was "not, then, a life-affirming masterpiece but a mildly hip and self-consciously mature collection of pop by committee [...] Thanks to seasoned hired hands, there are some terrific songs [...] but of genuine charisma, edge and all the other attributes that allegedly elevate the Sugababes above their peers, there is no sign." Shane Murray, writing for RTÉ, remarked that Three was "an album to be enjoyed, be it cranked up loud as you get ready for a night out or as a backdrop to an intimate evening with a loved one," while Rolling Stone critic Pat Blashill rated the album three ouf of five stars and wrote: "Sugababes may never be as big as the Spice Girls, but they're jiggier than Roxette and even more gangsta than All Saints."

== Commercial performance ==
Three debuted and peaked at number three on the UK Albums Chart with 52,905 copies sold in its first week. Certfifed platinum within four weeks only, it was certified double platinum by the British Phonographic Industry (BPI) on 9 January 2004. The album also received a Platinum Europe Award by the International Federation of the Phonographic Industry (IFPI) in recognition of European sales in excess of 1 million copies. In June 2019, the Official Charts Company (OCC) ranked Three tenth on its listing of the biggest girl band studio albums of the last 25 years.

== Track listing ==
Three track listing
No.	Title	Writer(s)	Producer(s)	Length
1.	"Hole in the Head"	Brian Higgins; Heidi Range; Keisha Buchanan; Miranda Cooper; Mutya Buena; Niara Scarlett; Nick Coler; Tim Powell	Higgins; Xenomania; Jeremy Wheatley; Yoad Nevo^{[a]}	3:38
2.	"Whatever Makes You Happy" (Keisha Buchanan solo)	Craig Dodds; Gary Cooper; Buchanan; Pete Martin; Stuart Crichton	Craigie; Guy Sigsworth; Crichton^{[b]}; Martin^{[b]}	3:15
3.	"Caught in a Moment"	Jony Lipsey; Karen Poole; Marius de Vries; Buchanan; Buena; Range	Jony Rockstar	4:24
4.	"Situation's Heavy"	Buchanan; Buena; Range; Tim Larcombe; Shawn Lee; Higgins; Cooper; Edele Lynch	Higgins; Xenomania	4:10
5.	"Million Different Ways"	Craigie; Crichton; Felix Howard; Guy Sigsworth; Buchanan; Buena; Range	Craigie; Sigsworth; Crichton^{[b]}	4:29
6.	"Twisted" (UK & Japan bonus track)	Buchanan; Buena; Range; Cooper; Higgins; Lee; Larcombe; Lynch	Higgins; Xenomania	3:03
7.	"We Could Have It All"	Craigie; Howard; Johnny Dollar; Buchanan; Buena; Range	Craigie; Sigsworth	3:37
8.	"Conversation's Over"	Tom Elmhirst; Lipsey; Poole; Buchanan; Buena; Range	Rockstar	4:06
9.	"In the Middle"	Cooper; Higgins; Scarlett; Lee; Lisa Cowling; Buchanan; Buena; Range; Andre Tegler; Phil Fuldner; Michael Bellina	Higgins; Xenomania; Wheatley; Moguai^{[a]}; Fuldner^{[a]}; Bellina^{[a]}	3:59
10.	"Too Lost in You"	Diane Warren	Andy Bradfield; Rob Dougan; Nevo^{[a]}	3:58
11.	"Nasty Ghetto"	Linda Perry; Buchanan; Buena; Range	Perry; Wheatley^{[a]}	4:16
12.	"Buster" (UK & Japan bonus track)	Buchanan; Buena; Range; Poole; Johnny Douglas	Douglas	4:22
13.	"Sometimes" (Heidi Range solo)	Howard; Range; Lipsey; Buchanan; de Vries; Buena	Rockstar	4:34
14.	"Maya" (Mutya Buena solo)	Craigie; Sigsworth; Buena; Range; Buchanan	Sigsworth; Craigie	4:43
Total length:				55:15

Notes and sample credits

- ^{^[a]} denotes additional producer
- ^{^[b]} denotes original producer
- "Whatever Makes You Happy" samples the music from the Sly Fox song "Let's Go All the Way".
- "In the Middle" contains a sample from "U Know Y" performed by German DJ Moguai.

== Charts ==
=== Weekly charts ===
Weekly chart performance for Three
Chart (2003)	Peak position
Australian Albums (ARIA)	118
Austrian Albums (Ö3 Austria)	21
Belgian Albums (Ultratop Flanders)	50
Danish Albums (Hitlisten)	39
Dutch Albums (Album Top 100)	4
Finnish Albums (Suomen virallinen lista)	40
French Albums (SNEP)	128
German Albums (Offizielle Top 100)	10
Irish Albums (IRMA)	9
New Zealand Albums (RMNZ)	45
Norwegian Albums (VG-lista)	22
Scottish Albums (Official Charts)	4
Swedish Albums (Sverigetopplistan)	54
Swiss Albums (Schweizer Hitparade)	9
UK Albums (OCC)	3
UK R&B Albums (Official Charts)	2

=== Year-end charts ===
2003 year-end chart performance for Three
Chart (2003)	Position
Dutch Albums (Album Top 100)	45
UK Albums (OCC)	31

2004 year-end chart performance for Three
Chart (2004)	Position
Dutch Albums (Album Top 100)	40
UK Albums (OCC)	68

== Certifications and sales ==
Certifications and sales for Three
Region	Certification	Certified units/sales
Germany (BVMI)	Gold	100,000^{^}
Russia (NFPF)	Gold	10,000^{*}
Switzerland (IFPI Switzerland)	Gold	20,000^{^}
United Kingdom (BPI)	2× Platinum	600,000^{^}
Summaries
Europe (IFPI)	Platinum	1,000,000^{*}
^{*} Sales figures based on certification alone.^{^} Shipments figures based on certification alone.
