= Love Actually (score) =

2003 film score album

Love Actually (Original Motion Picture Score)

Film score by Craig Armstrong
- Released: 19 November 2021
- Recorded: 2003
- Genre: Film score
- Length: 61:34
- Label: Back Lot Music; La-La Land Records
- Producer: Craig Armstrong

Craig Armstrong chronology
The Quiet American (2002)	Love Actually (2003)	The Clearing (2004)

Love Actually (Original Motion Picture Score) is the film score composed, produced, arranged and orchestrated by Craig Armstrong to the 2003 film Love Actually directed by Richard Curtis.

The film score soundtrack did not have a commercial release, only three of Armstrong's cues were included in the UK version of the film's soundtrack. On 19 November 2021, the score album was released digitally through Back Lot Music and on CDs by La-La Land Records.

== Background ==
Craig Armstrong composed the film score, in his maiden composition for a romantic comedy. Armstrong considered Richard Curtis to be a fantastic writer–director and a generous person, which led the composer to be comfortable and encouraging on the working process. The only advice that Curtis gave to Armstrong was not to worry about writing the comedic moments, but more to the emotion of the film, and following that, Armstrong focused on the specific moments that underline the emotional highlights.

The writing or the musical theme were intrinsically linked for the composer in each anthologies and also had an element of more technical writing in more specific scenes. The themes for the main dramatic moments were created first and everything followed suit thereafter. Armstrong considered the "Glagsow Love Theme", which played when Juliet discovers her husband's best friend is in love with her, to be his favorite theme, as it was hometwon and the theme was considered a tribute to the city, which was vibrant and friendly and the people there were being endearingly honest that prompted him to capture the romance and honesty of Glasgow through this theme. The theme was written to depict the romantic loneliness especially in a relationship about unrequited love.

== Reception ==
Thomas Glorieux of Maintitles wrote "Armstrong pushes some really big notes out there, pure romantic hearts and roses that must appeal to anyone who loves what is actually a good score, and a great film." Christian Clemmensen of Filmtracks stated that despite the limited availability and release, "its impact on the enjoyable film is more memorable than most others in this genre, earning Armstrong well deserved recognition for working his original music so effectively into environments otherwise dominated by songs" and concluded it "This is "warm and fuzzy" of the best kind."

== Track listing ==
No.	Title	Length
1.	"Opening Titles"	1:31
2.	"Christmas Is All Around (Montage)"	5:23
3.	"First Day"	0:48
4.	"Natalie with Tea Trolley"	0:18
5.	"In Love with Karl"	0:54
6.	"Sam's Bedroom"	0:48
7.	"On the Bench"	0:58
8.	"I'm in Love"	0:42
9.	"Total Agony"	1:57
10.	"Saucy Minx / Aurélia Arrives"	1:52
11.	"Bad Policies"	0:57
12.	"Discovery of Kiss / Press Conference"	2:22
13.	"Croissants in France"	1:07
14.	"The Lake Scene"	1:35
15.	"Saddest Part of Day"	1:13
16.	"Glasgow Love Theme"	2:05
17.	"PM Redistributes Natalie"	0:34
18.	"Jamie Leaves Aurélia"	2:44
19.	"Sarah & Karl Go Wrong"	1:34
20.	"Karen in Bed"	0:37
21.	"Harry & Mia"	1:08
22.	"Wrapping the Necklace"	2:55
23.	"Natalie on the Stairs"	2:08
24.	"Natalie at the School"	1:27
25.	"Natalie Revealed / Karen Confronts Harry"	1:49
26.	"Joanna Drives Off"	6:02
27.	"Sam & Joanna"	1:14
28.	"Portuguese Love Theme"	3:10
29.	"Christmas Is All Around" (film version) (performed by Bill Nighy as Billy Mack)	4:52
30.	"Greenshoots"	0:18
31.	"Restaurant Band"	0:32
32.	"PM's Love Theme"	2:12
33.	"Christmas Is All Around" (soundtrack version) (performed by Bill Nighy as Billy Mack)	3:48
Total length:		61:34

== Personnel ==
Credits adapted from liner notes:

- Music composer, arranger, producer – Craig Armstrong
- Orchestrator – Craig Armstrong, Matt Dunkley
- Conductor – Cecilia Weston
- Orchestra contractor – Isobel Griffiths
- Engineer – Jake Jackson
- Mixing – Geoff Foster
- Mastering – Doug Schwartz
- Liner notes – Jeff Bond
- Art direction – Dan Goldwasser
- Music business affairs – Sarah Hallbauer, Tanya Perara
- Executive in charge of music – Mike Knobloch
- Marketing and production manager – Andy Kalyvas, Nikki Walsh
- Music publishing executive – Eric Polin
- Project manager – Frank K. DeWald

== Love Actually – the Love Themes for Orchestra ==
Love Actually – the Love Themes for Orchestra is the album featuring adapted, extended and reworked versions of the themes from the original score. Most of the featured cues in the album were quite less than two minutes except for a few themes. The reworked themes were written and composed in Glasgow, recorded with the Budapest String Orchestra in Budapest, and mixed by Andy Bradfield in London. The album was released on 24 November 2023 coinciding with the 20th anniversary of the film.

No.	Title	Length
1.	"Glasgow Love Theme" (Extended Version)	4:08
2.	"Croissants In France" (Extended Version)	4:00
3.	"Jamie Leaves Aurelia" (Extended Version)	3:19
4.	"I'm In Love" (Extended Version)	1:22
5.	"Wrapping The Necklace" (Extended Version)	3:23
6.	"Portuguese Love Theme" (Extended Version)	3:28
7.	"Love Actually Opening" (Extended Version)	2:31
8.	"On The Bench" (Extended Version)	4:43
9.	"Glasgow Love Theme" (Extended Version)	2:34
10.	"Natalie On The Stairs" (Extended Version)	3:14
11.	"In Love With Karl" (Extended Version)	0:52
12.	"Croissants In France" (Chamber Version)	2:25
13.	"Sarah And Karl Go Wrong" (Extended Version)	2:05
14.	"PM's Love Theme" (Extended Version)	4:21
15.	"Portuguese Love Theme" (Chamber Version)	2:57
Total length:		45:22
