= In the Middle (Sugababes song) =

2004 single by Sugababes

Single by Sugababes

from the album Three
- B-side: "Colder in the Rain"; "Disturbed"
- Released: 22 March 2004
- Genre: Dance-pop
- Length: 3:38
- Label: Island
- Songwriters: Miranda Cooper; Brian Higgins; Niara Scarlett; Shawn Lee; Lisa Cowling; Keisha Buchanan; Mutya Buena; Heidi Range; André Tegeler; Phil Fuldner; Michael Bellina
- Producers: Brian Higgins; Xenomania; Jeremy Wheatley

Sugababes singles chronology
"Too Lost in You" (2003)	"In the Middle" (2004)	"Caught in a Moment" (2004)

Music video
- "In the Middle" on YouTube

"In the Middle" is a song by English girl group Sugababes, released on 22 March 2004 as the third single from their third studio album, Three (2003). The Sugababes were inspired to compose the song based upon the different situations experienced on a night out; they wrote it in collaboration with Miranda Cooper, Brian Higgins, Niara Scarlett, Shawn Lee, Lisa Cowling, Andre Tegler, Phil Fuldner and Michael Bellina. Higgins, Xenomania and Jeremy Wheatley produced the song. "In the Middle" is a dance-pop and funk-influenced record that contains a sample of German DJ Moguai's song "U Know Y".

The song received rave reviews from critics, who commended its production and appeal, and was nominated for Best British Single at the 2005 BRIT Awards. The single reached the top ten on the charts in Hungary, Netherlands and the United Kingdom. It also peaked within the top forty on the charts in Australia, Austria, Germany, Ireland and Switzerland. Matthew Rolston directed the song's music video, which was filmed at Pinewood Studios, London. It features the green screen effect and magical settings for the video's environments. The Sugababes performed the song on their tours in support of Three, Overloaded: The Singles Collection (2006) and Change (2007).

== Development and release ==
The Sugababes wrote "In the Middle" in collaboration with Miranda Cooper, Brian Higgins, Niara Scarlett, Shawn Lee, Lisa Cowling, André Tegeler, Phil Fuldner and Michael Bellina, for their third studio album, Three (2003). Group member Heidi Range revealed that the band wanted to write a song with which they could have fun; it was inspired by different situations experienced during a night out. Keisha Buchanan, another member of the Sugababes, told Digital Spy that she wrote 90% of the song but could not comprehend the meaning of the lyrics: "I think it's because as I've got older I don't really relate to the lyrics. It was more of a fun song but I just don't really feel that attached to it any more." Higgins, Xenomania and Jeremy Wheatley produced the song; the latter mixed it at the Town House Studios, London. "In the Middle" was programmed by Matt Duguid, Nick Coler, Tim Powell and Tim Larcombe.

The Sugababes confirmed through their official website in February 2004 that "In the Middle" would be the released as the album's third single. Island Records released it on 22 March 2004 as a CD single and digital download. The song's release coincided with the commencement of the group's UK tour in March 2004. The CD single and digital download releases contain a B-side titled "Disturbed". A maxi single was released; it includes the B-side "Colder in the Rain", and two remixes of the track, including one by DJ Hyper, which appears on his remix album, Wired (2004). In Australia, the song was issued on 5 April 2004 as a CD single. "In the Middle" is featured on the Sugababes' greatest hits album Overloaded: The Singles Collection.

== Composition and lyrics ==
"In the Middle"
A sample of the "club-style experimental" "In the Middle". The song is reminiscent of previous productions by Xenomania, namely "Round Round" and "Hole in the Head".

"In the Middle" is a dance-pop song with elements of funk. The Jerusalem Post's Harry Rubenstein described it as a "club-style experimental". According to the digital sheet music published by Hal Leonard Publishing, "In the Middle" was composed in the key of B minor using common time, with a tempo of 128 beats per minute. It is reminiscent of the group's singles "Round Round" and "Hole in the Head", both of which were also produced by Xenomania. "In the Middle" contains a sample of "U Know Y" by German DJ Moguai, and features guitar and keyboard instrumentation. The song contains a low bassline that derives from a synthesised trombone. The lyrical content of "In the Middle" is about finding a man after a night out, in which the chorus is opened with the lines, "I'm caught up in the middle, jumping through the riddle, I'm falling just a little tonight".

== Reception ==
=== Critical response ===
"In the Middle" received rave reviews from critics. Natasha Perry of Contactmusic.com named the song one of Three's "instant winners"; Harry Rubenstein from the Jerusalem Post similarly considered it one of the album's best tracks. The Guardian writer Andrew Mueller regarded "In the Middle" as "vastly superior", while Alan Braidwood of BBC described it as quality pop. Ben Hogwood of musicOMH questioned the number of songwriters it took to write the track, although cited this as reasons for the "polished production and slicker than slick chorus". Writing for the Daily Mirror, Gavin Martin commended the Sugababes' attitude in the song, which he described as "colourful and explosive". Dan Gennoe of Yahoo! Music characterised "In the Middle" as a "retro hip-shake". A critic from the Daily Record regarded the song as "addictive and dancey" and wrote that it highlights the group's "considerable charms". The writer noted that it echoes the appeal of their number-one singles, "Freak Like Me" and "Round Round".

James Mortlock of the Eastern Daily Press described "In the Middle" as a pop classic from the Sugababes, while Hot Press magazine's Phil Udell considered it one of the finest pop songs of the 2000s. "In the Middle" earned the Sugababes a 2005 BRIT Award nomination for Best British Single. However, the song was added to the category after the BRIT Awards organisers had made an error with the original list, as it was drawn up with the incorrect timescale.

=== Chart performance ===
"In the Middle" made its first chart appearance on the Irish Singles Chart on 25 March 2004 in which it peaked at number thirteen. It spent seven weeks on the chart, and was their second consecutive single to peak at this position. The song debuted and peaked at number eight on the UK Singles Chart for the issue dated 3 April 2004 and became the group's 6th consecutive top-ten hit in the UK. It spent eight weeks on the chart. The single's highest chart peak was on the Netherlands' Dutch Top 40 chart, where it debuted at number thirty-one and reached number seven three weeks later. It became the chart's 70th best-performing single of 2004. "In the Middle" peaked at number twenty-three on the Swiss Singles Chart, number twenty-nine on the German Singles Chart, number thirty-three on the Austrian Singles Chart, and number forty on the Belgian (Flanders) Ultratop chart. The single reached number nine on the Hungarian Dance Chart and number thirty-three on the Hungarian Radio Chart. "In the Middle" charted at number thirty-three on Australian Singles Chart, becoming the Sugababes' third consecutive top-forty hit in Australia.

== Promotion ==
=== Music video ===
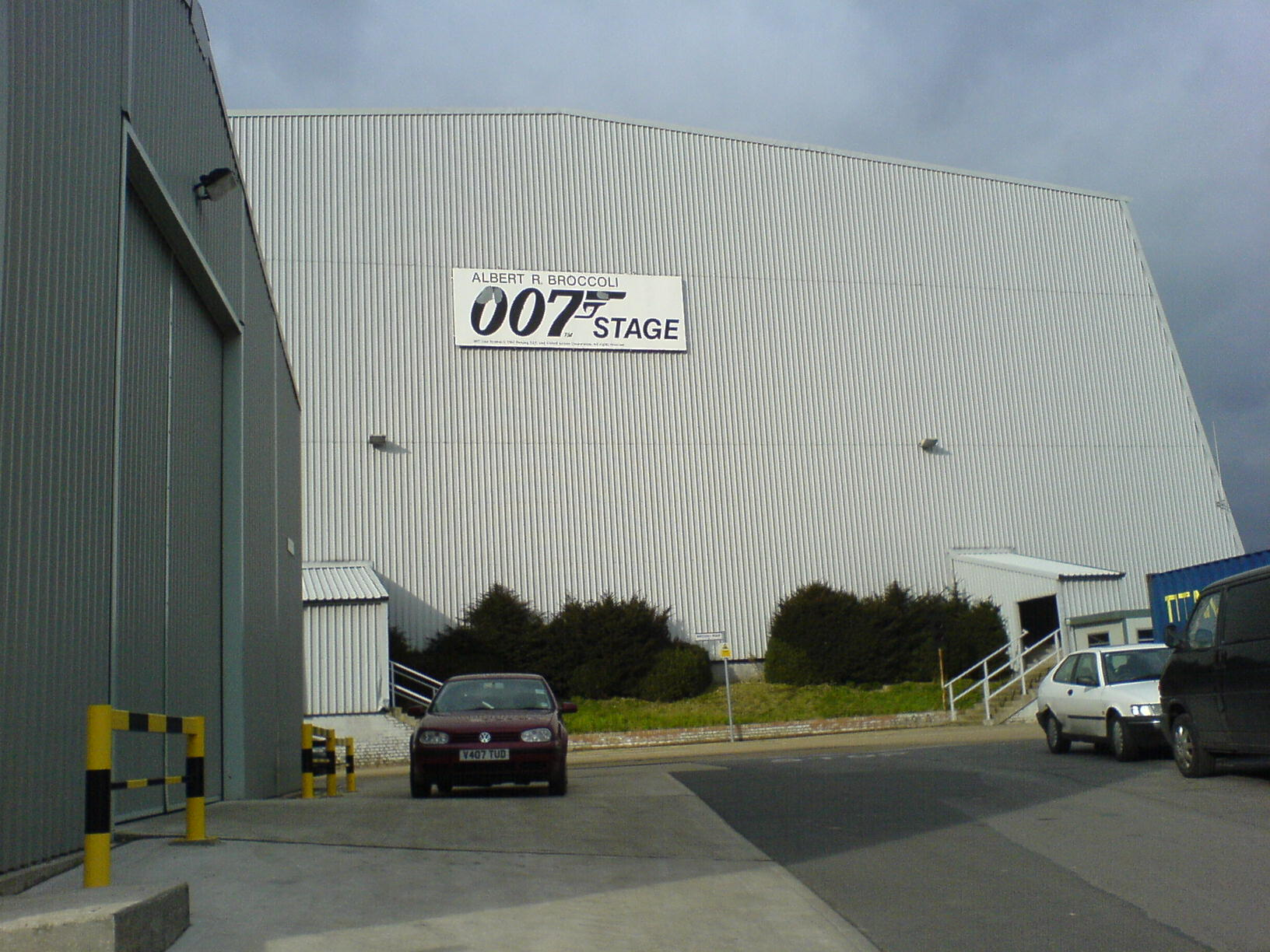
The music video was directed by Matthew Rolston and filmed at Pinewood Studios, London in February 2004.

The music video for "In the Middle" was directed by Matthew Rolston, who directed the video for the group's previous single "Hole in the Head". It was filmed at Pinewood Studios, London in February 2004. The photography was completed by Martin Ahlgren. Buchanan refrained from revealing details about the video before its release, saying: "The shoot went very well but what actually happens in the video is being kept a secret until it's shown. We’re all really excited and can't wait to hear what our fans think about it!" It aired on the Sugababes' official website, and on television, on 20 February 2004 and was included on the single's CD release.

Rolston used the green screen effect to produce the video, while the designs and effects for its environments were created by Jerry Steele. Rolston conceptualised a "prism-like" glass room with six sides and large glass walls, in which Steele was inspired to enhance it with effects including reflections and lights. The video was developed in magical settings, as STEELE VFX created "glamorous virtual environments" such as a sparkling glass room. Buchanan wore a bikini, covered in chains and spikes, for the video. She is featured in a blue room and has rainbow-coloured sparkles on her face. Buena, who is seen pole dancing in a green-coloured room, is shown controlling "smoke elements" with her hands. Range is shown in a pink room, and dances around a chair and against a wall. Throughout the video, each group member's first name appears on screen, Buena's is formed by smoke, Buchanan's is formed by diamonds and Range's is formed by metallic cubes.

The video uses the radio edit of the song, which is slightly re-recorded and remixed from the album version, and cuts the chorus between Buchanan's and Range's verses in half.

=== Live performances ===
The Sugababes performed an extended version of "In the Middle" during their UK tour in March and April 2004 to promote Three, in which they were supported by a four-piece band. The group performed the single, along with "Hole in the Head" and "Too Lost in You", at Birmingham's Party in the Park festival on 10 July 2004 and also the following day at the festival of the same name in London. "In the Middle" was included in the set list for the band's 2007 tour in support of Overloaded: The Singles Collection. In addition, it was performed as part of the group's 2008 Change Tour, in which the performances featured the group in large, mirrored skirts, while rays of light were reflecting around the venue. Kat Keogh of The Journal praised their performance at the Newcastle City Hall as one of the show's highlights, while a critic from The Scotsman described their performance at the Edinburgh Playhouse as "ridiculously camp", although admitted that the light effect was "simple yet fantastically effective". The Sugababes performed "In the Middle" on 10 July 2009 at the Riverside Ground in County Durham, England, as part of a set list.

== Track listings ==
CD1 single / digital download
No.	Title	Writer(s)	Producer(s)	Length
1.	"In the Middle" (radio edit)	Miranda Cooper; Brian Higgins; Niara Scarlett; Shawn Lee; Lisa Cowling; Keisha Buchanan; Mutya Buena; Heidi Range; André Tegeler; Phil Fuldner; Michael Bellina	Higgins; Xenomania; Jeremy Wheatley; Moguai^{[a]}; Fuldner^{[a]}; Bellina^{[a]}	3:38
2.	"Disturbed"	Dawn Joseph; Michael Scherchen; Naomi Striemer	Ben Thomas; Scherchen; Nigel Frieda^{[a]}	3:52

CD2 single
No.	Title	Writer(s)	Producer(s)	Length
1.	"In the Middle" (single version)	Cooper; Higgins; Scarlett; Lee; Cowling; Buchanan; Buena; Range; Tegeler; Fuldner; Bellina	Higgins; Xenomania; Wheatley; Moguai^{[a]}; Fuldner^{[a]}; Bellina^{[a]}	3:54
2.	"Colder in the Rain"	Buchanan; Buena; Tom Elmhirst; Felix Howard; Jony Lipsey; Range; Jeremy Shaw	Jony Rockstar	4:34
3.	"In the Middle" (Ruff & Jam MetalTronik mix edit)	Cooper; Higgins; Scarlett; Lee; Cowling; Buchanan; Buena; Range; Tegeler; Fuldner; Bellina	Higgins; Xenomania; Wheatley; Moguai^{[a]}; Fuldner^{[a]}; Bellina^{[a]}; Jean-Marie Moens^{[a]}; Luke Mourinet^{[a]}	5:43
4.	"In the Middle" (Hyper remix edit)	Cooper; Higgins; Scarlett; Lee; Cowling; Buchanan; Buena; Range; Tegeler; Fuldner; Bellina	Higgins; Xenomania; Wheatley; Moguai^{[a]}; Fuldner^{[a]}; Bellina^{[a]}; Hyper^{[a]}	5:46
5.	"In the Middle" (video)			3:54

Notes

- "In the Middle" contains a sample by "U Know Y" by Moguai.

== Personnel ==
Personnel are adapted from the liner notes of Overloaded: The Singles Collection.

- Songwriting – Miranda Cooper, Brian Higgins, Niara Scarlett, Shawn Lee, Lisa Cowling, Keisha Buchanan, Mutya Buena, Heidi Range, Andre Tegler, Phil Fuldner, Michael Bellina
- Production – Brian Higgins, Xenomania, Jeremy Wheatley
- Additional production – MOGUAI, Phil Fuldner, Michael Bellina
- Mixed by Jeremy Wheatley at the Townhouse Studios, London
- Programming – Matt Duguid, Nick Coler, Tim Powell, Tim Larcombe
- Keyboards – Brian Higgins, Tim Powell, Tim Larcombe
- Guitars – Nick Coler, Shawn Lee

== Charts ==
=== Weekly charts ===
Weekly chart performance for "In the Middle"
Chart (2004)	Peak position
Australia (ARIA)	33
Austria (Ö3 Austria Top 40)	33
Belgium (Ultratip Bubbling Under Wallonia)	9
Belgium (Ultratop 50 Flanders)	40
CIS Airplay (TopHit)	8
Germany (GfK)	29
Hungary (Dance Top 40)	9
Hungary (Rádiós Top 40)	33
Ireland (IRMA)	13
Netherlands (Dutch Top 40)	7
Netherlands (Single Top 100)	20
Romania (Romanian Top 100)	42
Russia Airplay (TopHit)	2
Scottish Singles Sales (Official Charts)	8
Switzerland (Schweizer Hitparade)	23
UK Singles (Official Charts)	8
UK Airplay (Music Week)	3

=== Year-end charts ===
Year-end chart performance for "In the Middle"
Chart (2004)	Position
Netherlands (Dutch Top 40)	70
UK Singles (OCC)	133
UK Airplay (Music Week)	30
