= Easy (Sugababes song) =

2006 single by Sugababes

Single by Sugababes

from the album Overloaded: The Singles Collection
- B-side: "Shake It"
- Released: 6 November 2006
- Recorded: June 2006
- Genre: Pop rock; electropop
- Length: 3:38
- Label: Island
- Songwriters: Jason Pebworth; George Astasio; Keisha Buchanan; Heidi Range; Amelle Berrabah
- Producers: Brio Taliaferro; Jason Pebworth; George Astasio

Sugababes singles chronology
"Follow Me Home" (2006)	"Easy" (2006)	"Walk This Way" (2007)

Music video
- "Easy" on YouTube

"Easy" is a song by British girl group Sugababes, released as the lead single from their greatest hits album Overloaded: The Singles Collection (2006). Development of "Easy" began when the American rock band Orson discovered that the Sugababes were working on a new album, in which they proposed ideas for new tracks. They subsequently wrote the song with the group, and produced it. Backed by bass synthesizers, it is an uptempo electropop and pop rock song that features metaphorical lyrical content containing sexual euphemisms. The song is the group's first single to feature written contributions from then-new member Amelle Berrabah, who had previously sung on re-recorded versions of three songs from the album Taller in More Ways, including the singles "Red Dress" and "Follow Me Home".

Critics praised the lyrics and bass synthesizer of "Easy", although some regarded the song as forgettable in comparison to the group's previous singles. The song peaked at number five on the Slovak Singles Chart and number eight on the UK Singles Chart. It reached the top twenty on the charts in Denmark, Finland, Ireland and Norway. The song's music video was directed by Tim Royes and filmed in a public toilet at a club in Romford. It features the Sugababes dressed in latex outfits, where they appear in separate toilet cubicles. The group performed "Easy" to promote the release of Overloaded: The Singles Collection.

== Background and release ==
The Sugababes confirmed in June 2006 that a greatest hits album would be released in time for Christmas of that year. The album, titled Overloaded: The Singles Collection, was confirmed to contain two brand new tracks called "Easy" and "Good to Be Gone". "Easy" was written by Jason Pebworth and George Astasio, both members of American rock band Orson, in collaboration with the Sugababes—Keisha Buchanan, Heidi Range and Amelle Berrabah. It was produced by Brio Taliaferro, Pebworth and Astasio. Orson, who shared the same management with the Sugababes, discovered that the group had begun writing material for their new album. They visited the studio with the Sugababes and offered ideas for new tracks, which the group enjoyed. Buchanan spoke upon the Sugababes' involvement with the song by saying that they "went into the studio separately" and "changed things around". "Easy" was mixed by Jeremy Wheatley for 365 Artists at Twenty-One Studios in London, with assistance from Richard Edgeler.

== Release ==
"Easy" was released on 6 November 2006, one week prior to the release of Overloaded: The Singles Collection. Range stated that the Sugababes enjoyed the song as soon as they heard it, and were convinced that it would be the lead single from the greatest hits collection. The digital download was released on the iTunes Store on 6 November 2006. The CD single was released on the same day, although features a B-side titled "Shake It". Another CD version of "Easy" contains a Seamus Haji & Paul Emanuel remix of the song, a dubstremental version of this remix, and a live V Festival performance of the group's 2003 number one hit "Hole in the Head". An Ultrabeat remix of the song was released on iTunes on 4 December 2006.

== Composition and lyrics ==
Sugababes – "Easy"
A 24-second sample of the second verse of "Easy", featuring a prominent use of the bass synthesizer.

"Easy" is an uptempo pop rock and electropop song that lasts three minutes and 36 seconds. A journalist from MTV UK described it as "a saucy slice of electro with a ravey chorus and naughty lyrics". It was composed in the key of F major using common time at 118 beats per minute. "Easy" features heavy use of synthesizers—most notably a bass synthesizer, as well as a "grinding electro riff". According to Fraser McAlphine of BBC, the chorus is reminiscent of songs performed by fellow British girl group, Girls Aloud. Ian Mathers from Stylus Magazine described the first half of the chorus as a "Hellogoodbye/Van She style 80s dancefloor euphoria". The song's lyrical content is metaphorical and features sexual euphemisms.

Buchanan described the song during an interview that was published on the group's official website, saying: "Easy is a very naughty and cheeky song – it’s the most sexy song we’ve ever done. It came about when Orson had an idea for a song. They played it to us – it was just a verse and a bridge and we completely changed the format of the song to make it our own and the result is this incredibly provocative sexy number that we love." She elaborated in a separate interview: "When we started working with the guys from Orson the sound just blew us away – it's completely fresh sounding but at the same time has the same qualities as the biggest songs of our career, so it's perfect for this album!"

== Critical reception ==
"Easy" received mixed reviews from critics. Betty Clarke of The Guardian described the song as "synth-heavy sauciness". John Dingwall from Daily Record gave the song full-five star rating, describing it as a "funky pop grower which beats many of the American acts at their own game". Stuart McCaighy of This Is Fake DIY wrote it "thrills with its edge electro bass", and that the Sugababes "come over all seductive with the most transparently obvious lyrical euphemisms heard in a long time." A journalist from Contactmusic.com regarded it as "smart, sexy and danceable, packed with hooks and undeniably fun." They described the verses as "low-slung" and the chorus as an "un-second guessable blast of pure pop". However, Cameron Adamns of the Herald Sun criticized "Easy" as having "none of the charm or sass" of the other songs on Overloaded. Tim Finney of Pitchfork Media had a similar response to the song, writing that it attempts to "reverse engineer the brand of cool that is commonly given to them via a limpid and largely tuneless rock-pop hybrid". Adam Webb of Yahoo! Music regarded the song as "forgettable".

== Chart performance ==
"Easy" entered the Irish Singles Chart on 2 November 2006 at number 34. The following week, it jumped to a peak position of number 18. The song debuted at number 30 the UK Singles Chart on 5 November 2006 and rose to its peak at number eight the following week, selling 14,745 copies on a busy release week with many other groups like Westlife, U2 with Green Day, and All Saints debuting on the charts or making significant chart jumps that same week. Ex-Sugababes member Mutya Buena's song with George Michael "This Is Not Real Love" also jumped from 76 to 15, selling 9,614 copies the same week. "Easy" became the Sugababes' twelfth top-ten hit in the country, and has since sold 60,000 copies in the UK. The song peaked in the top twenty on the Danish Singles Chart and Finnish Singles Chart, and the top thirty on the Austrian, German and Swiss singles charts. It reached number 18 on the Norwegian VG-lista chart for two weeks, and became the group's eleventh top-twenty hit in the country. The song peaked at number 45 on the Netherlands' Mega Single Top 100 chart, number 53 on the Czech Singles Chart, and number 56 on the Swedish Singles Chart. "Easy" performed most successfully on the Slovak Singles Chart, where it peaked at number five for two non-consecutive weeks, and spent six weeks in the chart's top ten.

== Music video ==
Amelle Berrabah, Keisha Buchanan and Heidi Range standing in separate public toilet cubicles in the music video of "Easy".

The accompanying music video for "Easy" was directed by Tim Royes, who directed the video for the group's previous single "Red Dress". It was released on the iTunes Store on 9 October 2006, and was featured on the group's compilation DVD, Overloaded: The Videos Collection, which accompanied the audio versions of the greatest hits album. Berrabah, Buchanan and Range and wore black latex outfits for the video, while Range wore a red wig. The video for "Easy" was filmed in a public toilet at a club in Romford.

The video begins with a scene of red nail polish dripping from a bottle. It then cuts to Buchanan, who is lying and tapping her foot against the floor in her black stiletto heels and latex stockings. She begins to start feeling her body. In the next scene, Range is seen standing in front of a mirror with a red lollipop, where she later begins to dance against the sink. Next, all the Sugababes are featured in separate toilet cubicles where they have their hands against the walls. The video cuts to Berrabah walking towards a hand dryer, which she rotates towards her face, causing her hair to be blown. After that, Range sits on a couch and uses the nail polish to colour her nails. The group is again seen in the cubicles, where they repeatedly open and close the doors. Shots underneath the doors show the girls moving their feet in their high-heel shoes. Later, Buchanan, Range and Berrabah are featured in front of red curtains with traditional silver, gold and black outfits, respectively. The final scene shows the group in front of the cubicles where they begin dancing robotically.

== Live performances ==
The Sugababes performed "Easy" in October 2006 at the 100 Club on Oxford Street in London, where they were promoting the release of Overloaded: The Singles Collection. The following month, they performed "Easy" at G-A-Y in the London Astoria. The single was included in the set list for the group's 2007 Overloaded: The Singles Tour, in promotion of the greatest hits album.

== Track listings ==
CD single
No.	Title	Writer(s)	Producer(s)	Length
1.	"Easy"	Amelle Berrabah; George Astasio; Heidi Range; Jason Pebworth; Keisha Buchanan	Brio Taliaferro; Pebworth; Astasio	3:38
2.	"Shake It"	Beverley Clarke; Gareth Young; Karl Gordon; Vikki O'Neill	K-Gee; Young^{[a]}	5:10

CD single
No.	Title	Writer(s)	Producer(s)	Length
1.	"Easy"	Berrabah; Astasio; Range; Pebworth; Buchanan	Taliaferro; Pebworth; Astasio	3:38
2.	"Easy" (Seamus Haji & Paul Emanuel Remix)	Berrabah; Astasio; Range; Pebworth; Buchanan	Taliaferro; Pebworth; Astasio; Seamus Haji^{[b]}; Paul Emanuel^{[b]}	5:29
3.	"Easy" (Seamus Haji & Paul Emanuel Instrumental)	Berrabah; Astasio; Range; Pebworth; Buchanan	Taliaferro; Pebworth; Astasio; Haji^{[b]}; Emanuel^{[b]}	5:29
4.	"Hole in the Head" (Live at V Festival)	Brian Higgins; Range; Buchanan; Miranda Cooper; Mutya Buena; Niara Scarlett; Nick Coler; Tim Powell		4:55

Digital download
No.	Title	Writer(s)	Producer(s)	Length
1.	"Easy"	Berrabah; Astasio; Range; Pebworth; Buchanan	Taliaferro; Pebworth; Astasio	3:38

Digital download
No.	Title	Writer(s)	Producer(s)	Length
1.	"Easy" (Ultrabeat Remix)	Berrabah; Astasio; Range; Pebworth; Buchanan	Taliaferro; Pebworth; Astasio; Ultrabeat^{[b]}	5:50

Digital download
No.	Title	Writer(s)	Producer(s)	Length
1.	"Easy" (Brio Alternative Version)	Berrabah; Astasio; Range; Pebworth; Buchanan	Taliaferro; Pebworth; Astasio; Brio^{[b]}	3:38

Notes

- ^{^a} denotes co-producer(s)
- ^{^b} denotes additional producer(s)

== Personnel ==
Personnel are adapted from the Overloaded: The Singles Collection liner notes.

- Songwriting – Jason Pebworth, George Astasio, Keisha Buchanan, Heidi Range, Amelle Berrabah
- Production – Brio Taliaferro, Jason Pebworth, George Astasio
- Mixing – Jeremy Wheatley for 365 Artists at Twenty-One Studios, London
- Mixing (assistant) – Richard Edgeler
- Executive producer – Sarah Stennett, Mark Hargreaves

== Charts ==
=== Weekly charts ===
Weekly chart performance for "Easy"
Chart (2006)	Peak position
Austria (Ö3 Austria Top 40)	23
Belgium (Ultratip Bubbling Under Flanders)	3
CIS Airplay (TopHit)	73
Czech Republic Airplay (ČNS IFPI)	53
Denmark (Tracklisten)	13
Finland (Suomen virallinen lista)	12
Germany (GfK)	26
Global Dance Songs (Billboard)	36
Hungary (Rádiós Top 40)	34
Ireland (IRMA)	18
Netherlands (Single Top 100)	45
Norway (VG-lista)	18
Russia Airplay (TopHit)	71
Scottish Singles Sales (Official Charts)	6
Slovakia Airplay (ČNS IFPI)	5
Sweden (Sverigetopplistan)	56
Switzerland (Schweizer Hitparade)	30
UK Singles (Official Charts)	8
UK Airplay (Music Week)	19
Ukraine Airplay (TopHit)	148

=== Year-end charts ===
Year-end chart performance for "Easy"
Chart (2006)	Position
UK Singles (OCC)	192
