= Caught in a Moment =

2004 single by Sugababes

Single by Sugababes

from the album Three
- B-side: "Conversation's Over"; "Hole in the Head"
- Released: 23 August 2004
- Studio: Mayfair; Strongroom; Metropolis
- Genre: Pop; soul; R&B
- Length: 4:23
- Label: Island
- Songwriters: Jony Rockstar; Karen Poole; Marius De Vries; Keisha Buchanan; Mutya Buena; Heidi Range
- Producer: Jony Rockstar

Sugababes singles chronology
"In the Middle" (2004)	"Caught in a Moment" (2004)	"Push the Button" (2005)

Music video
- "Caught in a Moment" on YouTube

"Caught in a Moment" is a song by English girl group Sugababes from their third studio album Three (2003). It was released in the United Kingdom on 23 August 2004 as the album's fourth and final single. The song was written by the group's members in collaboration with Karen Poole, Marius De Vries and its producer Jony Rockstar. "Caught in a Moment" is a downtempo pop, soul and R&B ballad backed by an orchestral musical arrangement, and contains emotive lyrics that explore concepts of melancholy and hopefulness. The track received mixed reviews from critics who were ambivalent towards its balladry.

Following its release, the song became the group's fourth consecutive top-ten hit on the UK Singles Chart, while internationally it peaked within the top forty on the singles charts of Ireland, Hungary and the Netherlands. The music video, which is black-and-white, was directed by Howard Greenhalgh and features the Sugababes' silhouettes behind a large screen. To promote "Caught in a Moment", the trio performed it at the Bristol International Balloon Fiesta and as part of the set lists for their tours in support of Taller in More Ways (2005), Overloaded: The Singles Collection (2006) and Change (2007).

== Background and composition ==
In late 2002, the Sugababes began to work on songs for their third studio album Three (2003). They wrote and recorded material in various countries around the world as they performed at festivals such as the Liverpool Summer Pops. "Caught in a Moment" was written by the Sugababes—consisting of Keisha Buchanan, Mutya Buena and Heidi Range—in collaboration with Karen Poole, Marius De Vries and its producer, Jony Rockstar. Pete Craigie recorded the group's vocals while Tom Elmhirst mixed the song; both musicians engineered it. "Caught in a Moment" is the album's fourth and final single, and was released as a CD single in the United Kingdom on 23 August 2004. It appears on the soundtrack to the 2004 film Wimbledon, and is included on the group's 2006 greatest hits album Overloaded: The Singles Collection.

"Caught in a Moment" is a downtempo pop, R&B and soul ballad, with similar production to the Sugababes' older ballads "Stronger" and "Too Lost in You". It was composed in the key of E minor using common time at a tempo of 72 beats per minute, and follows the chord progression of Em—A—D. The song's instrumentation is provided by bass, guitar, percussion, piano, beats, strings, violins, cello and double bass. The strings are high-pitched and the song is supported by an electronica-infused ambience. "Caught in a Moment" contains emotive lyrics that explore concepts of melancholy and hopefulness. It was compared to the works of girl band All Saints, and English musical group Massive Attack.

== Reception ==
=== Critical response ===
"Caught in a Moment" received mixed reviews from critics. K. Ross Hoffman of AllMusic described the song as "a stirring, string-laden monolith of melody" and commended it as the standout ballad from Three. Dorian Lynskey of The Guardian praised the song as terrific and highlighted its "deep-pile swoon". Dan Gennoe of Yahoo! Music wrote that "Caught in a Moment" and "Too Lost in You" are reminders that the Sugababes "handle trip-hop melancholy with the same devastating confidence as their seething club stomps". According to a critic from Entertainment Ireland, "Caught in a Moment" is one of three tracks from the album that displays the group's "funky vocals and brattish attitude". A writer for Daily Record described it as a "slow, thoughtful number" with sophisticated sounds. Hot Press magazine's Phil Udell called the song an elegant ballad, while Shane Murray of RTÉ.ie described it as atmospheric.

The song's balladry was also a focal point for criticism. Writers from the London Evening Standard wrote that "instead of sweeping you up all misty-eyed" like their previously released ballad "Too Lost in You", "Caught in a Moment" "drifts by a bit inconsequentially". The Observer's Kitty Empire was unfavourable of the sound and mature nature of the song, questioning: "Who wants Sugababes to grow up gracefully, into the mini-Gabrielle poses of songs like 'Caught in a Moment'?" A writer from Virgin Media criticised the song's "trudging" balladry and its orchestral backdrop as bland, elaborating: "For a band who've previously put out some genuinely edgy and confident pop, this is inexcusably forgettable". A critic from The Scotsman regarded "Caught in a Moment" as a mediocre filler track, while The Independent's Simon Price considered it insipid. Anna Britten of Yahoo! Music rated the song five out of ten stars and wrote that it "has all the standard features of your average MOR lady ballad".

=== Chart performance ===
The song's first chart appearance was on the 26 August 2004 issue of the Irish Singles Chart, where it debuted and peaked at number 28. It subsequently became the group's second lowest-charting single in Ireland to date. "Caught in a Moment" was most successful on the UK Singles Chart, where it debuted at number eight with sales of 11,633 copies, and became the Sugababes' fourth consecutive top-ten hit in the United Kingdom. The song spent seven weeks on the chart. In the Netherlands, "Caught in a Moment" debuted on the Dutch Top 40 chart at number 32 and later peaked at number 30, while on the Mega Single Top 100 chart, it reached number 46. The ballad reached number 38 on the Hungarian Dance Chart, and number 56 on the Austrian and Swiss charts. The song spent nine weeks on the German Singles Chart, where it charted at number 71.

== Music video ==
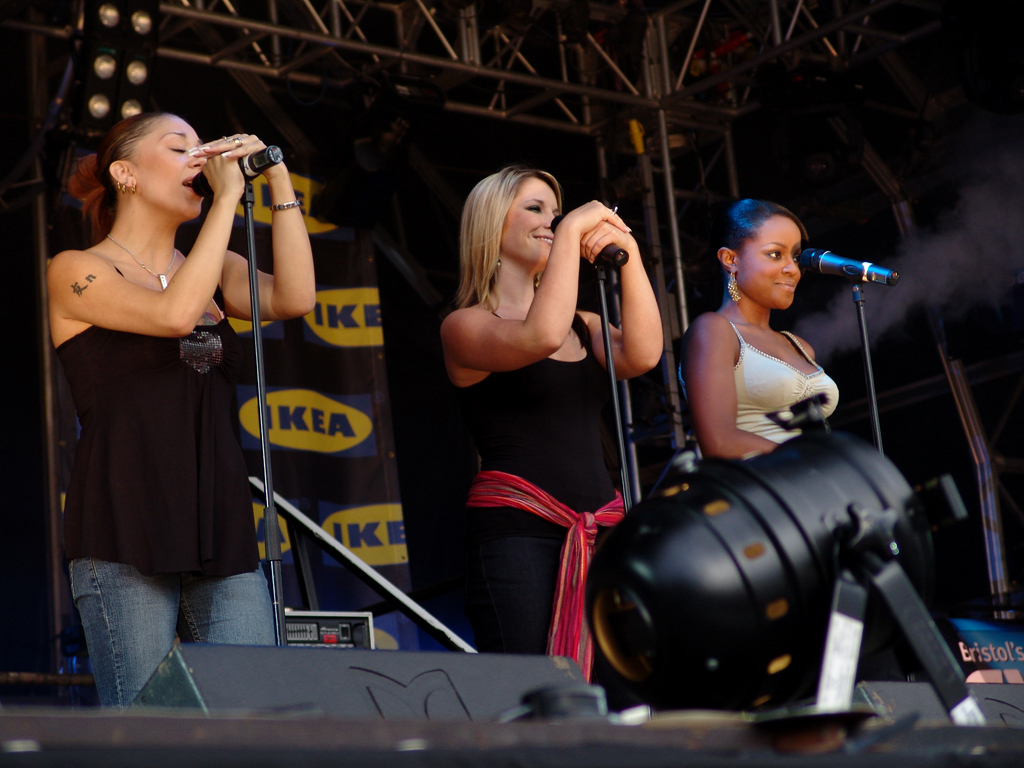
The Sugababes' performing Caught in the Moment live.

The music video for "Caught in a Moment" was directed by Howard Greenhalgh and filmed in July 2004. It was reported that during the filming, Buena, Buchanan and Range were experiencing conflicts, refused to speak with each other and would only communicate through intermediaries. According to British newspaper the Daily Star, "the frosty silence between Mutya, Heidi and Keisha, made for a difficult afternoon's work". The video is black-and-white, and features Buena and Range in dresses, and Buchanan in a two-piece outfit. It was later included on the group's DVD release, Overloaded: The Videos Collection.

During the video, the group's members undress and kiss a man behind a large screen. The clips show them seated both individually and as a group, and surrounded by large lights which flash several times. At the time of its release, the video was considered one of the group's most sexually suggestive videos; Sky News described it as "their most explicit yet with scenes showing the girls writhing, stripping and kissing in silhouette behind giant screens". A critic from the Daily Record was favourable of the video and wrote that it "sums up the classy appeal" of the song. It debuted and peaked at number 12 on the UK TV airplay chart.

== Live performances ==
The Sugababes performed "Caught in a Moment" on 12 August 2004 at the Bristol International Balloon Fiesta, which is one of Europe's biggest balloon festivals. The third-line up of the band, consisting of Buchanan, Range and Amelle Berrabah, performed "Caught in a Moment" at the Sheffield City Hall in March 2006 as part of their tour in support of Taller in More Ways (2005). According to Dave Simpson of The Guardian, the performance suggested that Berrabah "could trigger an unlikely shift into soul" for the group. The trio performed "Caught in a Moment" at the 100 Club, London on 3 October 2006 as part of a gig, which was in promotion of Overloaded: The Singles Collection. They performed the song as part of the Overloaded tour, and were seated on stools in the centre of the stage. With regard to their performance on 13 April 2007 at the Wembley Arena, London, Ben Rawson-Jones of Digital Spy commented: "Their epiphanic beauty was fully realised with the fragile, emotive nature of Heidi's voice and Keisha's powerful singing". "Caught in a Moment" appeared in the set list for the group's 2008 Change Tour. According to The Journal's Kat Keogh, their performance at the Newcastle City Hall "displayed a confident shift from moody pop princesses to sassy Supremes-style harmony".

== Track listings ==
CD1 single
No.	Title	Writer(s)	Producer(s)	Length
1.	"Caught in a Moment"	Jony Lipsey; Karen Poole; Marius de Vries; Keisha Buchanan; Mutya Buena; Heidi Range	Jony Rockstar	4:23
2.	"Caught in a Moment" (D-Bop remix)	Lipsey; Poole; de Vries; Buchanan; Buena; Range	Jony Rockstar; Andy Allder^{[a]}; Dave Cross^{[a]}	5:34

CD2 single
No.	Title	Writer(s)	Producer(s)	Length
1.	"Caught in a Moment"	Lipsey; Poole; de Vries; Buchanan; Buena; Range	Rockstar	4:23
2.	"Conversation's Over" (AOL Session)	Tom Elmhirst; Lipsey; Poole; Buchanan; Buena; Range	Rockstar	4:08
3.	"Hole in the Head" (AOL Session)	Brian Higgins; Range; Buchanan; Miranda Cooper; Buena; Niara Scarlett; Nick Coler; Tim Powell	Higgins; Xenomania; Jeremy Wheatley; Yoad Nevo^{[a]}	3:34

Notes

- ^{^[a]} denotes additional producer

== Credits and personnel ==
Credits are taken from the liner notes of Overloaded: The Singles Collection.

Recording

- Recorded in Mayfair, Strongroom and Metropolis

Personnel

- Songwriting – Jony Rockstar, Karen Poole, Marius De Vries, Keisha Buchanan, Mutya Buena, Heidi Range
- Production – Jony Rockstar
- Mixing – Tom Elmhirst at Metrapolis
- Vocal recording – Pete Craigie
- Engineering – Pete Craigie
- Additional vocal engineering – Jonathan Shakhovskoy
- Pro Tools – Jonathan Shakhovskoy
- Additional engineering – Richard Wilkinson
- Bass – Marius de Vries
- Guitar – Shawn Lee
- Percussion – Pete Lockett
- Piano – Chris Elliot
- Beats – Jony Rockstar
- Strings arranged and conducted by Guy Farley
- Strings recorded by Mike Ross Trevor at Sony Studios, Whitfield Street
- Assistant engineer – Dave Clarke
- Violin – Marcia Crayford, David Juritz, Darrell Kolk, Thomas Bowes, Martin Burgess, Alison Kelly, Jan Schmolck, Gaby Lester, Philippe Hanoré, Fenella Barton, Ralph De Souza, Simon Smith, Steve Morris, Sophie Barber, Celia Sheen, Liz Edwards, Douglas Mackie, Manon Derome, Jo Godden, Sue Briscoe
- Viola – Roger Benedict, Vicci Wardmen, Tim Grant, Fiona Bonds, Jonathan Barritt, Ivo Van Der Werff
- Cello – Caroline Dale, Nick Roberts, Jonathan Williams, Melissa Phelps, Caroline Dearnley, Lional Handy
- Double bass – Dominic Seldis, Steve Williams, Lynda Houghton, Steve Mair

== Charts ==
=== Weekly charts ===
Weekly chart performance for "Caught in a Moment"
Chart (2004)	Peak position
Austria (Ö3 Austria Top 40)	56
Germany (GfK)	71
Hungary (Dance Top 40)	38
Ireland (IRMA)	28
Netherlands (Dutch Top 40)	30
Netherlands (Single Top 100)	46
Romania (Romanian Top 100)	66
Scottish Singles Sales (Official Charts)	9
Switzerland (Schweizer Hitparade)	56
UK Singles (Official Charts)	8
UK Airplay (Music Week)	14

=== Year-end charts ===
Year-end chart performance for "Caught in a Moment"
Chart (2004)	Position
UK Singles (OCC)	188
