= Moguai =

German music producer and DJ

MOGUAI
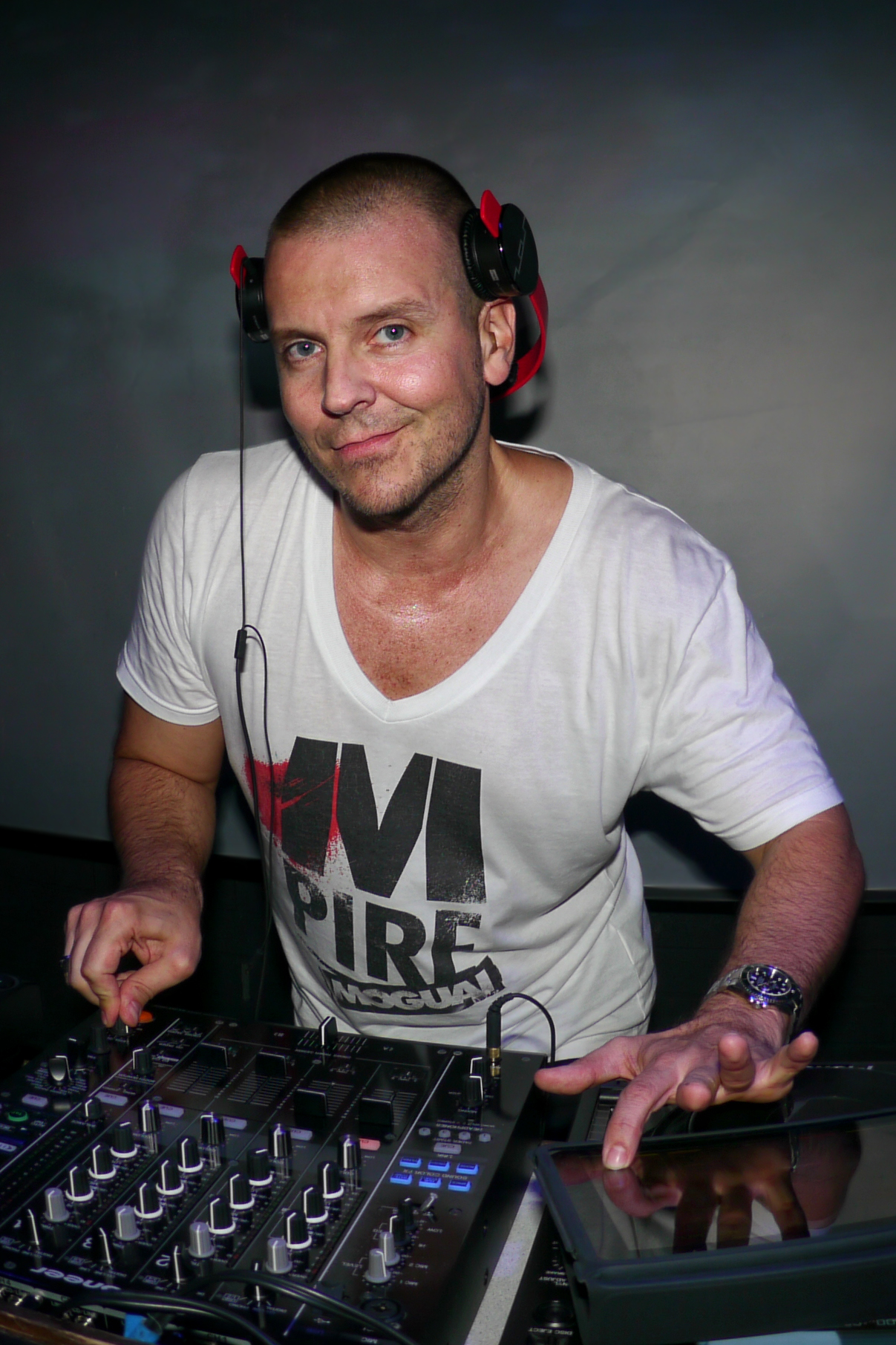

Background information
- Birth name: André Tegeler
- Born: 9 August 1973 (age 51); Recklinghausen, West Germany
- Genres: Electronic, house
- Occupation(s): DJ, music producer
- Years active: 1994–present
- Labels: mau5trap, Punx, Size, Spinnin', Heldeep, Musical Freedom, Spinnin' Deep, Fly Eye, Enormous Tunes, Axtone
- Website: moguai.com

André Tegeler (born 9 August 1973), known by his stage name Moguai (stylised as MOGUAI), is a German music producer and DJ. In the early 1990s, he took the alias Moguai and began organising his own club nights and parties in Ruhrgebiet and Münsterland. He became one of the first techno DJs in Germany, sharing a platform with the likes of Paul van Dyk, Westbam and Sven Väth.

In more recent years, however, Moguai's sound has developed to include a combination of tech-house, progressive house, big beat and electro house. He has also worked in more mainstream areas of the music industry, producing for the likes of the Sugababes, Girls Aloud and 2Raumwohnung, which earned him double platinum and gold disc awards.

== Early life and education ==
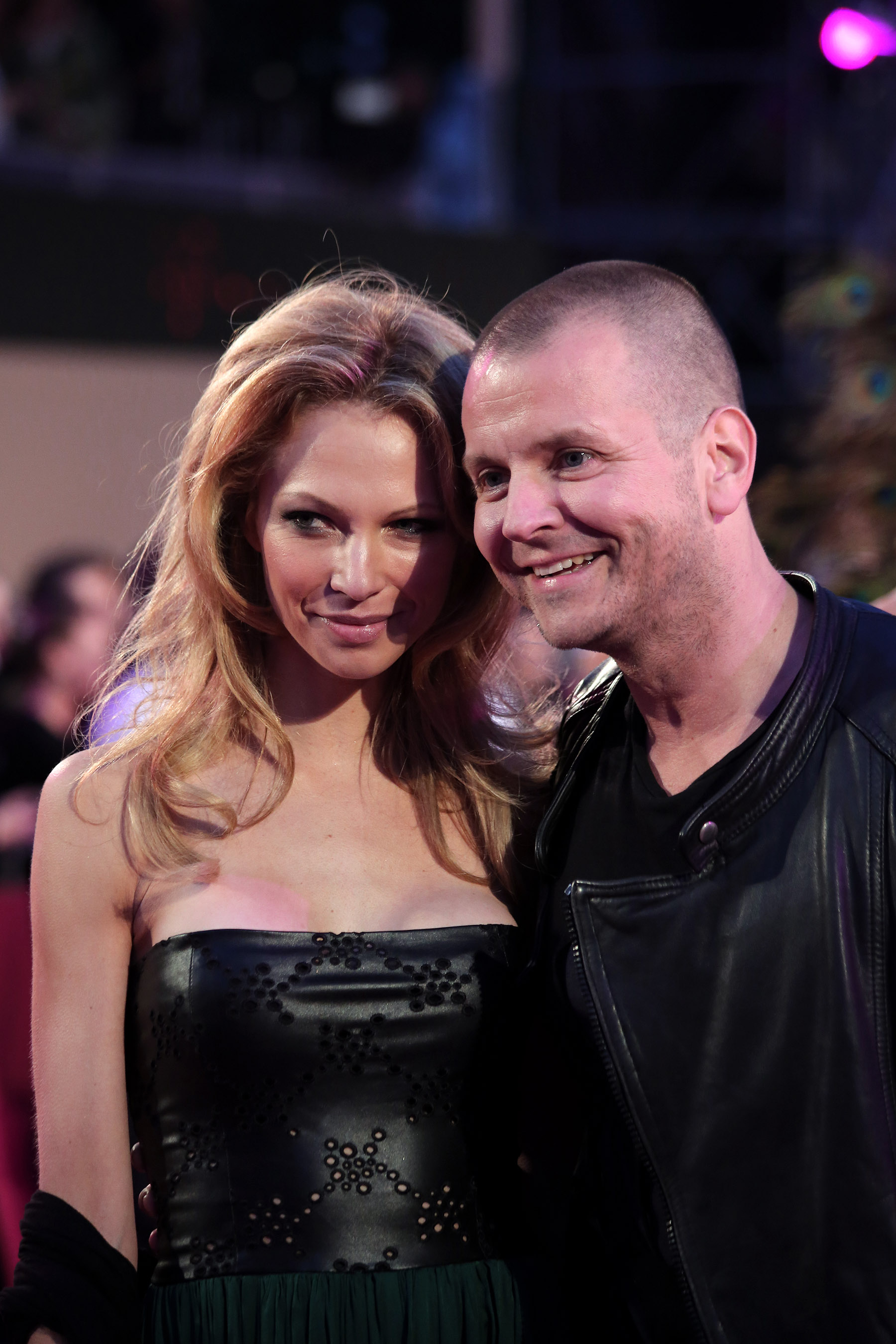
Moguai with his wife Birte Glang

Tegeler was born in Recklinghausen, North Rhine-Westphalia. He studied for his high school diploma at the Freiherr-von-Stein-Gymnasium in Recklinghausen, after which he completed a two-year apprenticeship in the family butcher business, making him the youngest journeyman butcher in North Rhine-Westphalia. He then went on to study law at the Ruhr University in Bochum, which is where he also embarked upon his career as a DJ and music producer.

== Career ==
=== Music ===
In 1994, Tegeler, now trading under the name Moguai, teamed up with German producer Jürgen Driessen to release his debut EP, entitled Best Before End, with Important Records. The following year, Moguai set up his own studio with Phil Fuldner, called PUNX Studios. Arguably the studio's greatest successes were Fuldner's The Final (1998), which became the theme tune for the cult manga series Captain Future, and Moguai's Beatbox, which was the first electronic instrumental track to hold 10 weeks in the German top 40.

At the same time, Moguai collaborated as a remixer with artists such as Giorgio Moroder, Yves Deruyter, Timo Maas, Planet Funk, Cosmic Baby, BBE, Fischerspooner and 2raumwohnung. In 2002 and 2006, respectively, he worked with British production house Xenomania, specifically on their work for bands Sugababes and Girls Aloud on In the Middle (Sugababes) and Something Kinda Ooh (Girls Aloud), respectively. Both of which were reworks of two of Moguai's previous singles U Know Y and Get On. He would later receive credit on the song Come Back to Mine by Xenomania's in-house drummer and recording artist Florrie. He was awarded double platinum records for both of these projects. Similarly, in 2005, he teamed up with German electro-pop duo 2raumwohnung to create the single Sasha (Sex Secret) on the album Es wird Morgen, which went Gold.

Since 2009, Moguai has released his music with Mau5trap, run by Canadian superstar DJ Deadmau5. His first EP release with this label was We Are Lyve (2010), which featured the singles Impereal, Nyce and Blau. Currently, the label represents the likes of Eekkoo, REZZ, and No Mana, but one of its first artists, Skrillex, won three Grammys in 2012, helping secure the great reputation the label enjoys today.

In March 2011, he joined forces with Mau5trap and Beatport to produce an hour-long progressive house mix, Lyve from Beta, recorded at the Beta Club in Denver, Colorado, and edited using Ableton Live software. The set is made up entirely of his own tracks, making it one of the few albums that combines both live and pre-recorded DJing by the same artist. The success of this album earned him a great deal more international acclaim, with artists such as Britney Spears, Beyoncé, Fatboy Slim, Underworld, Afrojack and Felix da Housecat approaching him for collaborations and remixes. In January 2012, he released Mpire, again on Mau5trap, collaborating with Kosheen, Fiona Cutler, Polina Goudieva and Tommy Trash.

=== Radio ===
Since 2000, Moguai has been a radio DJ and presenter at Radio 1Live (West German Broadcasting) on the 1Live DJ segment, which runs every Saturday from 22:00 pm to 01:00 am. The show also features guest DJs, and in the past has included the likes of Avicii, Tiesto, Paul van Dyk, Steve Aoki, Dimitri Vegas & Like Mike and Turntablerocker. The final hour of the show belongs to the 1Live residents, which include Andhim, AKA AKA, Claptone, Wankelmut and many more.

In 2007, Moguai was made a resident DJ at German radio station MDR Sputnik, where he plays every third Saturday of the month. In 2008, he launched his own monthly radio podcast on Digitally Imported Radio called Punx Up the Volume. It can also be heard on the radio in the UK, the US, Australia, Russia and Brazil. In 2009, he launched an eponymous two-hour radio show every fourth Thursday with German radio station Sunshine Live.

== Television ==
=== As host ===
==== MTV ====
- Chillout Zone
- Party Zone
- Select
- In Touch

==== VIVA ====
- 5-hour live moderation of Nature One, 2001
- Guest moderator of Mayday, 2001
- Clubrotation
- Berlin House

== Discography ==
Studio albums

- We Ar Lyve (2010)
- Mpire (2012)
- Colors (2021)
