= Love Actually (soundtrack) =

2003 film soundtrack album

Love Actually (Original Motion Picture Soundtrack)

Soundtrack album by Various artists
- Released: 17 November 2003
- Recorded: 2003
- Genres: Pop rock; classical; soft rock; funk; soul
- Length: 70:08 (UK); 65:10 (US)
- Labels: Universal; Island
- Producers: Clive Davis; Nick Gatfield; Duncan Kenworthy; Nick Angel; Richard Curtis

Love Actually (Original Motion Picture Soundtrack) is the soundtrack album to the 2003 film Love Actually directed by Richard Curtis. The album was released through Island Records and Universal Records on 17 November 2003, and featured 20 tracks from popular artists, and including two pieces from the score composed by Craig Armstrong.

The US edition of the soundtrack removed two pieces of the score and "Sometimes" by Gabrielle and reordered the tracklist, featuring 17 tracks, as both the US and UK versions featured two instances of alternative music. The US version also replaced the Girls Aloud cover of "Jump (For My Love)" with the original by The Pointer Sisters, and replaced Maroon 5's "Sweetest Goodbye" with a medley of "Sweetest Goodbye" with "Sunday Morning".

The soundtrack was a chart topping success in the United States and United Kingdom. The soundtrack album reached number one on the UK Albums Chart, and by Christmas 2018 it had spent 348 weeks on the Chart. It reached the top forty on the US Billboard 200 in 2004 and ranked second on the Top Soundtracks chart. The album was certified "Gold" by the Recording Industry Association of America for selling 50,000 units in the United States and "Platinum" by the British Phonographic Industry for selling around 2 million units in the United Kingdom.

== Track listing ==
UK soundtrack
No.	Title	Artist	Length
1.	"Jump"	Girls Aloud	3:39
2.	"Too Lost in You" (Love Actually version)	Sugababes	4:10
3.	"The Trouble with Love Is"	Kelly Clarkson	3:44
4.	"Here with Me"	Dido	4:05
5.	"Christmas Is All Around"	Bill Nighy as Billy Mack	3:56
6.	"Turn Me On"	Norah Jones	2:33
7.	"Songbird"	Eva Cassidy	3:43
8.	"Sweetest Goodbye"	Maroon 5	4:30
9.	"Wherever You Will Go"	The Calling	3:28
10.	"I'll See It Through"	Texas	3:40
11.	"Both Sides Now" (2000 version)	Joni Mitchell	5:45
12.	"White Christmas"	Otis Redding	2:33
13.	"Take Me as I Am"	Wyclef Jean and Sharissa	4:15
14.	"All I Want for Christmas Is You"	Olivia Olson as Joanna	3:26
15.	"God Only Knows"	The Beach Boys	2:50
16.	"All You Need Is Love"	Lynden David Hall	3:48
17.	"Sometimes"	Gabrielle	4:48
18.	"Glasgow Love Theme"	Craig Armstrong	2:05
19.	"PM's Love Theme"	Craig Armstrong	2:03
20.	"Portuguese Love Theme"	Craig Armstrong	1:07
Total length:			70:08

US soundtrack
No.	Title	Artist	Length
1.	"The Trouble with Love Is"	Kelly Clarkson	3:42
2.	"Here with Me"	Dido	4:15
3.	"Medley: Sweetest Goodbye/Sunday Morning"	Maroon 5	5:46
4.	"Turn Me On"	Norah Jones	2:34
5.	"Take Me as I Am"	Wyclef Jean and Sharissa	4:18
6.	"Songbird"	Eva Cassidy	3:45
7.	"Wherever You Will Go"	The Calling	3:29
8.	"Jump (For My Love)"	The Pointer Sisters	4:23
9.	"Both Sides Now" (2000 version)	Joni Mitchell	5:46
10.	"All You Need Is Love"	Lynden David Hall	3:30
11.	"God Only Knows"	The Beach Boys	2:54
12.	"I'll See It Through"	Texas	4:05
13.	"Too Lost in You" (Love Actually version)	Sugababes	4:13
14.	"Glasgow Love Theme"	Craig Armstrong	2:05
15.	"White Christmas"	Otis Redding	3:07
16.	"Christmas Is All Around" (soundtrack version)	Bill Nighy as Billy Mack	3:50
17.	"All I Want for Christmas Is You"	Olivia Olson as Joanna	3:28
Total length:			65:10

== Reception ==
Heather Phares of AllMusic wrote "While Love Actually is actually far from a perfect collection of love songs, the soundtrack is pleasant enough that fans of the film will probably enjoy it on its own." Katie Moten of RTÉ wrote "Love Actually is an enjoyable listen for fans of the film, as well as hopeless romantics everywhere". Taylor Mayle of Bustle wrote "The soundtrack, much like the film, is a cup of hot chocolate on a rainy day: comforting, inviting, and invoking the same warm fuzzies you might get when looking at a newly decorated tree or snuggling in front of a fire with your special someone. And perhaps most importantly, the songs will remind you of pieces of your own life, and everything that's gotten you from one holiday season to the next."

== Chart performance ==
=== Weekly charts ===
2003–2004 weekly chart performance for Love Actually
Chart (2003–2004)	Peak position
Australian Albums (ARIA)	9
Belgian Albums (Ultratop Flanders)	51
Belgian Albums (Ultratop Wallonia)	62
Dutch Albums (Album Top 100)	19
French Albums (SNEP)	77
Hungarian Albums (MAHASZ)	8
New Zealand Albums (RMNZ)	38
Norwegian Albums (VG-lista)	29
Spanish Albums (Promusicae)	76
Swiss Albums (Schweizer Hitparade)	18
UK Compilation Albums (OCC)	2
UK Soundtrack Albums (OCC)	1
US Billboard 200	39
US Top Soundtracks (Billboard)	2

2024 weekly chart performance for Love Actually
Chart (2024)	Peak position
UK Album Downloads (OCC)	24

=== Year-end charts ===
2003 year-end chart performance for Love Actually
Chart (2003)	Position
UK Albums (OCC)	37

2004 year-end chart performance for Love Actually
Chart (2004)	Position
US Billboard 200	167
US Soundtrack Albums (Billboard)	16

== Certifications ==
Region	Certification	Certified units/sales
Australia (ARIA)	Platinum	70,000^{^}
United Kingdom (BPI)	2× Platinum	600,000^{*}
United States (RIAA)	Gold	500,000^{^}
^{*} Sales figures based on certification alone.^{^} Shipments figures based on certification alone.
