= Too Lost in You =

2003 single by Sugababes

Single by Sugababes

from the album Three and Love Actually (soundtrack)
- B-side: "Someone in My Bed"; "Down Down"
- Released: 15 December 2003
- Studio: Realsongs, Studio D (Los Angeles)
- Genre: Pop rock; R&B
- Length: 3:59
- Label: Island
- Songwriter: Diane Warren
- Producers: Rob Dougan; Andy Bradfield

Sugababes singles chronology
"Hole in the Head" (2003)	"Too Lost in You" (2003)	"In the Middle" (2004)

Music video
- "Too Lost in You" on YouTube

"Too Lost in You" is a song by English girl group Sugababes from their third studio album, Three (2003). It was written by American songwriter Diane Warren as an English rendition of the song "Quand j'ai peur de tout" ("When I'm Afraid of Everything") by French singer Patricia Kaas (which had lyrics in French by Jean-Jacques Goldman). The song was produced by the Australian musician Rob Dougan in collaboration with Andy Bradfield, and recorded at the Realsongs studio in Hollywood. This original version of "Too Lost in You" is prominently featured in the soundtrack to the 2003 film Love Actually, and was chosen for the film specifically by its director Richard Curtis. It is a pop rock and R&B ballad composed of an orchestral music arrangement and dark harmonies.

"Too Lost in You" was released in the United Kingdom on 15 December 2003 as the album's second single and featured a new mix to its production. It received favourable reviews from most critics, who commended the Sugababes' performance and considered it one of the best pop singles of the 2000s. The song was commercially successful worldwide, and reached the top ten on the singles charts of the Netherlands, Norway, Switzerland and the United Kingdom. A music video for the single was directed by Andy Morahan and filmed at London Stansted Airport over a two-day period. It features each member of the Sugababes with a man from the airport. Since its release, "Too Lost in You" has become a staple of the group's live performances, and was included in the set lists for their tours in support of Taller in More Ways (2005), Overloaded: The Singles Collection (2006) and Change (2007).

== Development and release ==
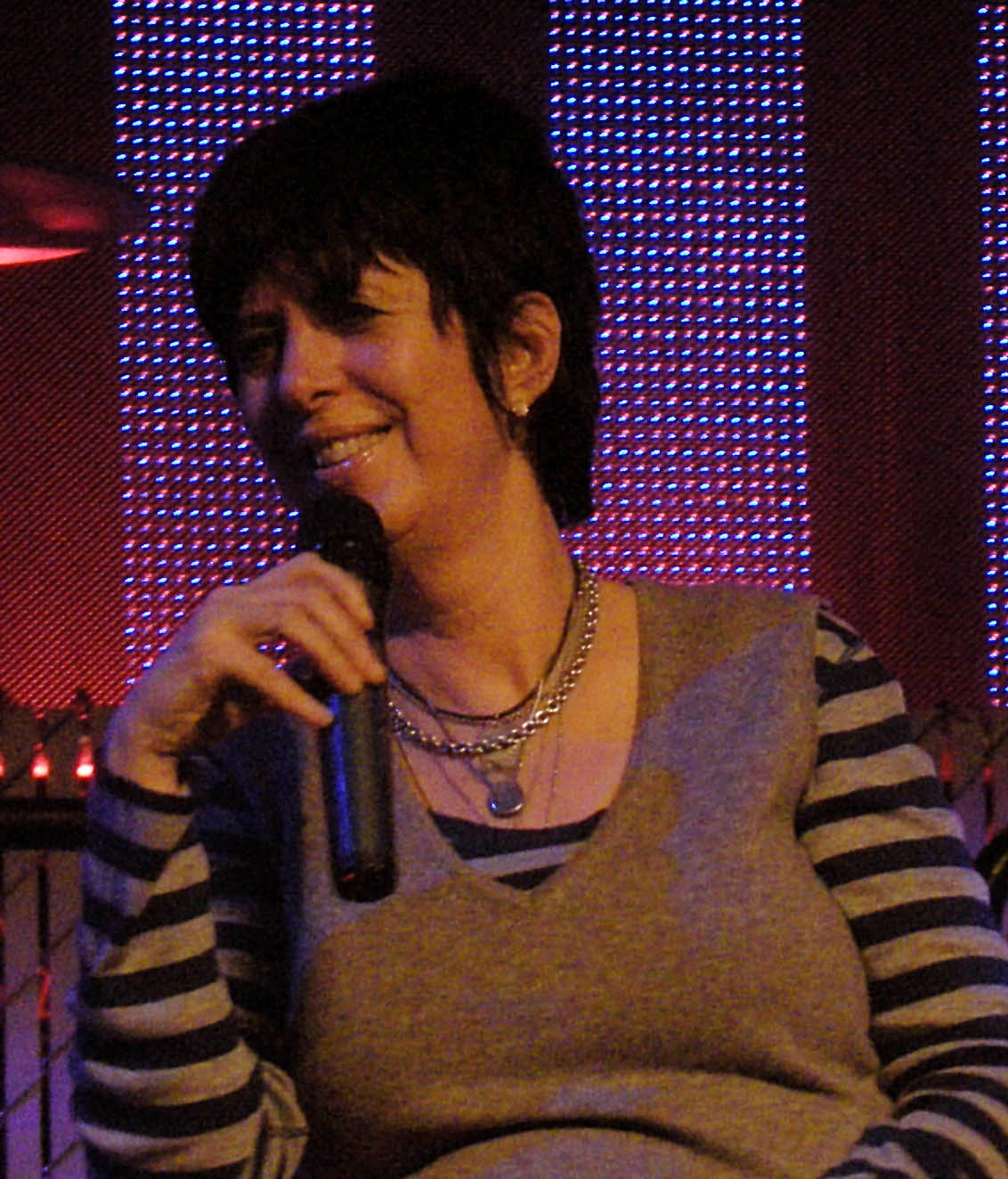
"Too Lost in You" was written by the American songwriter Diane Warren.

"Too Lost in You" is a cover of "Quand j'ai peur de tout" ("When I'm Afraid of Everything"), a 1997 song performed by French singer Patricia Kaas. It was written in English by American songwriter Diane Warren for the Sugababes' third studio album, Three (2003). Warren composes her songs in an uncleaned room, where she is seated on an old stool and surrounded by keyboards, drum machines, and a tape recorder. Group member Heidi Range commented on the experience of collaborating with Warren, saying: "It could be easy to turn around and make people feel not as important as you. She made us feel 100 percent comfortable." The song was produced by Andy Bradfield and the Australian musician Rob Dougan, and mixed by Bradfield. It was recorded at Realsongs, which is located in Hollywood and shares the name of Warren's publishing company. "Too Lost in You" was programmed by Yoad Nevo, who also provided the instruments. The group members' vocals were engineered by Mario Luccy and produced by Khris Kellow. According to Range, "Too Lost in You" represented all three group members' romantic lives, saying: "You need that comfort when you go home."

"Too Lost in You" is prominently featured on the soundtrack to the romantic comedy film Love Actually, which was released to cinemas in the United Kingdom on 21 November 2003. The director, Richard Curtis, specifically chose the song for the film, and described the soundtrack as "the life and soul of the film." According to Heather Phares of AllMusic, "[a]n emphasis on songs from British artists, such as Sugababes' "Too Lost in You" [...] keep the soundtrack from becoming too predictable". "Too Lost in You" is the second single from Three, and was released as a CD single and 12-inch single in the United Kingdom on 15 December 2003. The song's release around Christmas time prompted several media outlets to classify it as a contender for the 2003 Christmas number one. In Australia, the song was issued as a CD single on 9 February 2004.

== Composition ==
"Too Lost in You" is a downtempo pop rock and R&B ballad, backed by an orchestral music arrangement that consists of a piano and strings. A writer from Music Week noted that Dougan's production of the song provides it with a "dramatic, string-soaked feel". According to the digital sheet music published by EMI Music Publishing, the song was composed in the key of C sharp minor using common time signature, at a tempo of 98 beats per minute. The Sugababes' vocal range in the song spans from the lower note of E_{3} to the higher note of C#_{5}. Like many of Warren's compositions, the lyrics follow the verse-chorus form; the song also includes a middle eight performed by Range. "Too Lost in You" is emotive and melodic, and presents the group's dark harmonies throughout. According to Harry Rubenstein of The Jerusalem Post, "[in 'Too Lost in You'] we're led to believe that these girls are actually losing control in a moment of passion, but the song refrains from moving into typical pop fairy-land characters". A survey conducted by scientists in 2004 found that the song's slow tempo can assist in the prevention of accidents and promotion of safer driving.

== Critical response ==
The song received generally positive reviews from most critics. Simon Evans of musicOMH described "Too Lost in You" as "instantly, infectiously likeable" and called it one of the album's best tracks. According to Alan Braidwood of BBC Music, the ballads from Three, including "Too Lost in You", match the quality of the group's songs "New Year" and "Stronger". Dan Gennoe of Yahoo! Music interpreted the song as a reminder that the Sugababes "handle trip-hop melancholy with the same devastating confidence as their seething club stomps". Herald Sun critic Cameron Adams wrote that the group made "Too Lost in You" sound edgy and described it as "stunning". Writing for Hot Press, Phil Udell praised the Sugababes' performance of the ballad, which he considered a transition from Warren's "big radio number" into "something genuinely lovely".

Becky Howard and Andrew Williams of the London Evening Standard wrote that "Too Lost in You" "[sweeps] you up all misty-eyed" and regarded it as "utterly brilliant" in comparison to "Caught in a Moment", another ballad from Three. The Observer's Kitty Empire was unfavourable and criticised the song's "dead maturity", while Stuart McCaighy of This Is Fake DIY regarded the song as turgid. Fiona Shepherd of The Scotsman dismissed lines such as "Flowing into your arms, falling into your eyes" as "lyrical gubbins" and stated that the song's release would be "for the name behind [it] rather than any individual merits". In 2007, Udell described "Too Lost in You" as one of the finest pop songs of the 2000s. James Mortlock of the Eastern Daily Press considered it to be one of the group's classic pop singles.

== Commercial performance ==
"Too Lost in You" debuted on the Irish Singles Chart on 18 December 2003 at number 16 and peaked at number 13 in the issue dated 15 January 2004. The song achieved more success in the group's native United Kingdom; it entered the UK Singles Chart on 25 December 2003 at number ten, a position it held for two consecutive weeks. By early 2010, it had sold 145,000 copies in the United Kingdom, ranking as the Sugababes' tenth highest-selling single in the country. "Too Lost in You" was also a top-ten hit in various other European countries. The song peaked at number seven on the Norwegian Singles Chart and became the group's fifth top-ten hit in Norway. On the Swiss Singles Chart, it debuted at number 26 on 18 January 2004 and peaked at number eight on 1 February 2004. The single was the band's fourth top-ten single in Switzerland, spent 18 weeks on the chart, and ranked 53rd on the chart's 2004 year-end list. "Too Lost in You" entered the Dutch Top 40 chart at number 24 and reached number eight four weeks later, continuing the trio's string of top-ten singles in the Netherlands. The song peaked at number 13 on the Hungarian Dance Chart, 14 on the German Singles Chart, and number 17 on the Danish Singles Chart. It became the band's first top-forty hit on the French Singles Chart, where it appeared at number 22. "Too Lost in You" also reached the top forty on the singles charts of Australia, Austria, Belgium, New Zealand and Sweden.

On 2 December 2022, the single charted at number 29 on the UK Official Singles Sales Chart Top 100; one week before, "Too Lost in You" had been danced to as a rumba by Fleur East and dance partner Vito Coppola on Strictly Come Dancing.

== Music video ==
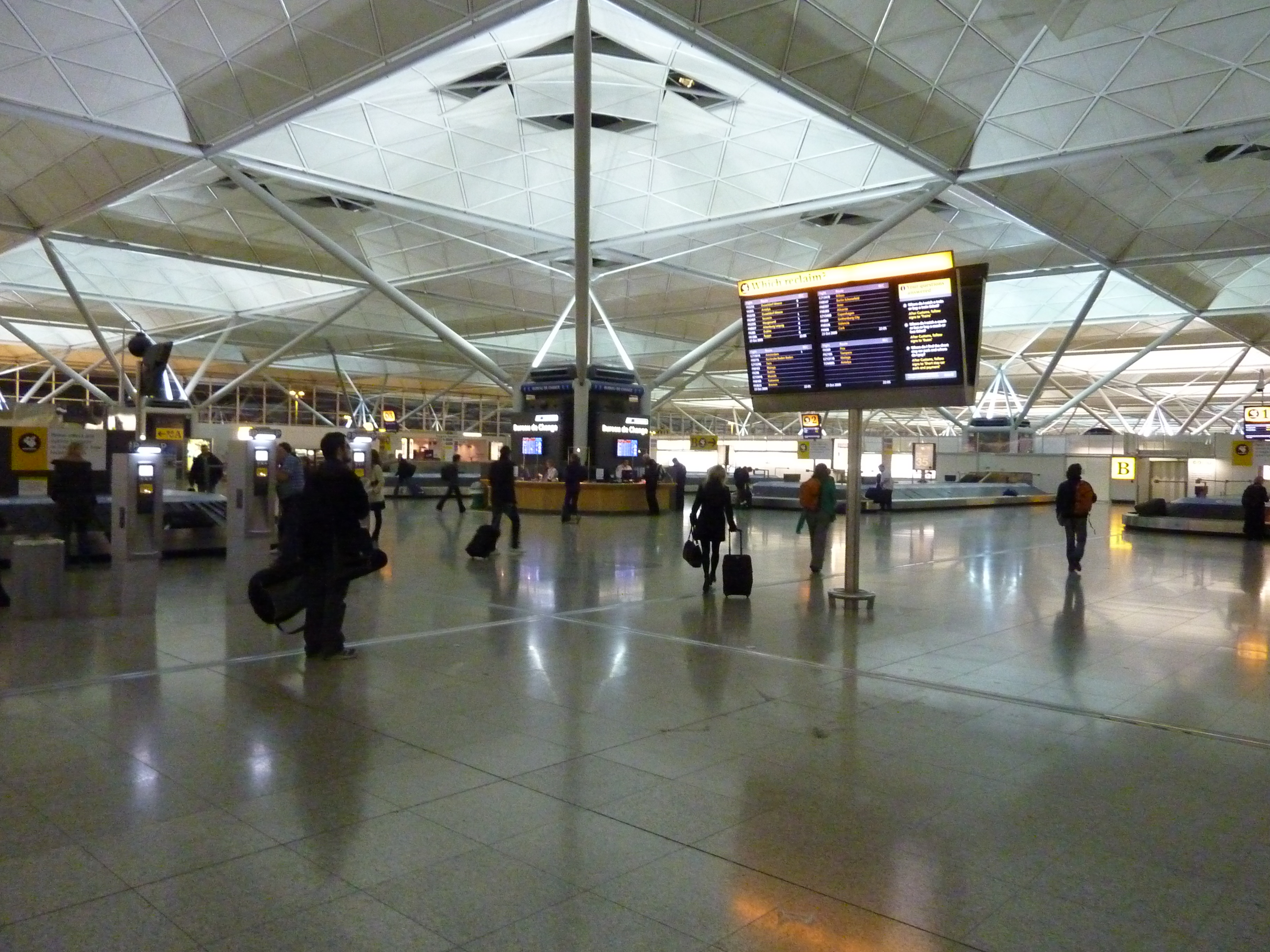
The music video was filmed at London Stansted Airport, where each group member captures the attention of a man.

The music video for "Too Lost in You" was directed by Andy Morahan and filmed at London Stansted Airport in November 2003 over a two-day period. It premiered on the Sugababes' official website in the same month, and was included on the song's CD release. The video begins with the trio walking together in the airport. Buchanan captures the attention of a passenger and begins to have fantasies about him, in which she positions him into a chair and touches his body. In subsequent scenes, the man is shown handcuffed. Buena fantasizes about a worker who she sees in the airport and slices his shirt off with a sword. Range gets the attention of a flight attendant and has dream sequences of touching and kissing him; she also throws a large bag full of ice onto him.

Following the completion of the video, clips from Love Actually were added to it in promotion of the film's release.

== Live performances ==
The Sugababes performed "Too Lost in You" on the British television programme TRL in December 2003, and at the MTV Asia Awards on 14 February 2004. The song was one of six tracks that they played on 20 June 2004 at Live & Loud, a music event held at Hampden Park in Glasgow, Scotland. The group performed "Too Lost in You", along with "Hole in the Head" and "In the Middle", at Birmingham's Party in the Park festival on 10 July 2004. The song was played as part of a gig in August 2004 at Delamere Forest, Cheshire, in which a critic from the Manchester Evening News wrote that the Sugababes "showed they can handle a ballad as well as the uptempo material in their vast pop catalogue". The group sang "Too Lost in You" at the Edinburgh Corn Exchange on 18 August 2004 as part of a set list. The song was performed as part of the Sugababes' 2006 tour in support of Taller in More Ways. They played it during a gig at the 100 Club, London on 3 October 2006 in promotion of their 2006 greatest hits album, Overloaded: The Singles Collection, and on the album's accompanying 2007 tour in the UK and Ireland. The group performed an acoustic version at the Peel Bay Festival during June 2007 in Peel, Isle of Man, as part of a set list; the event contained a crowd of 25,000 people.

The band played "Too Lost in You" in July 2007 at the Liverpool Summer Pops festival, which was held at the Aintree Pavilion. The group performed the single on 14 September 2007 at London's music club indig02, and according to Nick Levine of Digital Spy, their harmonies managed "the unfathomable trick of sounding both delicate and sturdy". "Too Lost in You" was included in the set list for their 2008 Change Tour. The trio played it on 3 July 2008 at the Liverpool Summer Pops, held in Echo Arena Liverpool. In June 2009, they performed the single at the Cannock Chase Forrest as part of a 75-minute show, and at Canterbury, Kent as the sixth song on the set list. During the latter performance, members of the crowd began to leave the event after Range forgot the words to the song. The Sugababes performed "Too Lost in You" on 10 July 2009 at the Riverside Ground in County Durham, England, as part of a set list, and on 12 July 2009 at the Cornbury Music Festival. In early 2010, the fourth line-up of the Sugababes, comprising Range, Amelle Berrabah and Jade Ewen, played the single during the album launch for Sweet 7 as the fourth song on the set list. In November 2010, the three singers performed "Too Lost in You" at the Yas Hotel in Abu Dhabi along with many other of the group's songs.

Mutya Keisha Siobhan, the group's original line-up, performed the song along with "Promises", "Overload", "Run for Cover", "Freak Like Me", "Push the Button", "Hole in the Head" and "Stronger" as part of the Sacred Three tour.

== Track listings and formats ==
- UK and European CD1 maxi single
1. "Too Lost in You" – 3:59
2. "Someone in My Bed" – 4:16
3. "Too Lost in You" (Kujay DaDa's Bass Shaker Mix) – 6:45
4. "Too Lost in You" (Video)
- UK and European CD2 maxi single
1. "Too Lost in You" (Love Actually Version) – 4:12
2. "Down Down" – 2:50
3. "Too Lost in You" (Kardinal Beats LA Remix) – 4:50
- European CD single and German 3-inch mini CD single
1. "Too Lost in You" – 3:59
2. "Someone in My Bed" – 4:16
- UK 12-inch single
1. "Too Lost in You" (Kujay DaDa's Bass Shaker Mix) – 6:45
2. "Who" – 3:46
3. "Too Lost in You" (Kardinal Beats LA Remix) – 4:50

== Credits and personnel ==
Credits are adapted from the liner notes of Overloaded: The Singles Collection (2006).

Recording

- Vocals recorded at Realsongs Studio D, Hollywood

Personnel

- Songwriting – Diane Warren
- Production – Rob Dougan, Andy Bradfield
- Additional programming – Yoad Nevo
- Instruments – Yoad Nevo
- Vocal producer – Khris Kellow
- Executive producer – Diane Warren
- Vocal engineer – Mario Luccy
- Piano – Rob Dougan
- Mixing – Andy Bradfield
- Orchestra – Prague Symphony Orchestra
- Strings – Nick Ingman, Rob Dougan
- Orchestral arrangement – Nick Ingman, Rob Dougan
- Conductor – Nick Ingman
- Vocals – Keisha Buchanan, Mutya Buena, Heidi Range

== Charts ==
=== Weekly charts ===
Chart (2003–2004)	Peak position
Australia (ARIA)	31
Austria (Ö3 Austria Top 40)	26
Belgium (Ultratop 50 Flanders)	28
Belgium (Ultratop 50 Wallonia)	28
Croatia International Airplay (HRT) (Note: Only a partial archive of the Croatian charts is available so it is possible that the single had a higher peak.)	8
Denmark (Tracklisten)	17
Denmark Airplay (Tracklisten)	10
France (SNEP)	22
Germany (GfK)	14
Greece (IFPI)	28
Hungary (Dance Top 40)	13
Ireland (IRMA)	13
Netherlands (Dutch Top 40)	8
Netherlands (Single Top 100)	10
New Zealand (Recorded Music NZ)	31
Norway (VG-lista)	7
Poland (Polish Airplay Chart)	9
Romania (Romanian Top 100)	44
Scottish Singles Sales (Official Charts)	12
Sweden (Sverigetopplistan)	30
Switzerland (Schweizer Hitparade)	8
UK Singles (Official Charts)	10
UK Airplay (Music Week)	3

=== Year-end charts ===
Chart (2003)	Position
UK Singles (OCC)	167

Chart (2004)	Position
Germany (Media Control GfK)	88
Netherlands (Dutch Top 40)	64
Netherlands (Single Top 100)	90
Switzerland (Schweizer Hitparade)	53
UK Singles (OCC)	145
UK Airplay (Music Week)	31

== Certifications ==
Region	Certification	Certified units/sales
New Zealand (RMNZ)	Gold	15,000^{‡}
United Kingdom (BPI)	Platinum	600,000^{‡}
^{‡} Sales+streaming figures based on certification alone.
