= Nick Coler =

English musician (born 1952)

- Also known as: Coler
- Born: Nicholas Coler; 10 April 1952 (age 74); Redhill, England
- Genres: Pop, electronica
- Occupations: Musician, songwriter, producer
- Instruments: Piano, keyboards, bass guitar, guitar, trombone
- Years active: 1970–present
- Labels: Bronze, Beggars Banquet, Universal, A&M, Warner Bros, BMG
- Website: mrmagus.com

Nick Coler (born 10 April 1952) is an English musician, producer, composer and songwriter. He has been nominated for and won awards for songwriting and music production and has written, produced and played on hit songs for diverse acts ranging from Goldie, KLF, and Alice Cooper to Girls Aloud, Sugababes, and Gabriella Cilmi.

== Early life ==
Coler was born in London and was educated at St. Joseph's Roman Catholic Nunnery, Redhill, Surrey (where he was thrown out), Alexander road, infants, Woodhatch, St. Johns, Primary, St Mary's preparatory and choir school, Balcombe road Horley, Reigate art school.

== Career ==
=== 1970s ===
His first music-related job was working as a session player for Bronze Records in 1978 after being scouted by producer Martin Smith while recording the band he was in, "Why Worry.” During this time he worked with and appeared live with such bands as Goldie and The Small Ads amongst others. In 1979, Coler was signed to Warner Bros. Music with the band The Tigers.

=== 1980s ===
Then was signed to A & M Records in the USA, during this time he worked with bands such as The Dynamites, Tokyo Blade, Ya Ya, Angel Witch and the Cutting Crew, The JAMS, Zodiac Mindwarp, Alice Cooper, The Timelords, and The KLF.

=== 1990s ===
Coler rented a studio with Hans Zimmer and was an integral creative part of the cult band The KLF. In the book "The Manual" Jimmy Cauty and Bill Drummond write – "Our programmer, Nick Coler, is a genius. He can play on the piano every piece of music ever written, his left hand a blur of fumbled bass notes, while his spectacles slide down his perspiring nose. His cathedral choir boy sense of fun has never left him and he sports a line of strange hand knitted jumpers. Is continually trying out new haircuts. Drives second hand Audi's. He plays keyboards with The Rubettes.”

In 1993, Coler also worked on the less well received single "Lemmings", based upon the Lemmings computer game and credited to SFX, released under Parlophone, spending three weeks in the charts.

During this time he also worked with Ned's Atomic Dustbin, Jesus Jones, Pete Wylie, Shampoo, Cher, The Montrose Avenue, The Young Offenders, The Rubettes, Indecent Obsession and Chicane.

=== 2000s ===
From its inception Coler was a core member of the Xenomania production house along with Tim Powell, Brian Higgins and Miranda Cooper writing, playing and producing on numerous top ten hits for acts such as the Sugababes, Girls Aloud, Gabriella Cilmi, Franz Ferdinand, Pet Shop Boys, Alesha Dixon, Texas, Kylie Minogue, Enrique Iglesias.

He left Xenomania in 2010 and is now signed to BMG Berlin working on new acts with his own independent production company Mr Magus including acts such as CTA, Felony Disco and Randomizer.

During his career he has also worked on various soundtracks including Wayne's World and Revenge of the Nerds and contributed music for numerous television shows from Tweenies to Totally Spies!.

=== 2010s ===
In 2011, Coler played at the Southbank Centre Festival Hall participating in a Vintage Weekend at the behest of Saint Etienne's Bob Stanley playing alongside other notable musicians such as Graham Gouldman of 10cc and Rob Davis of Mud fame.

Coler has also produced and collaborated on the 2012 Saint Etienne release Words and Music by Saint Etienne which has received universal acclaim according to Metacritic's review criteria.

He has also written a track for Starlight Express with Andrew Lloyd Webber, he has been nominated for three Ivor Novello Awards for the Girls Aloud song – "The Promise", Sugababes' song "Hole in the Head" and Gabriella Cilmi's song "Sweet About Me", and has won the Music Week's Producer of the year award as part of Xenomania in 2009.

=== 2020s ===
In April 2026, it was announced he was adapting the 2019 film Fighting with My Family into a stage musical, alongside Miranda Cooper and Jon Brittain.
