= Hole in the Head =

2003 single by Sugababes

Single by Sugababes

from the album Three
- B-side: "Who"; "This Ain't a Party Thing"
- Released: 13 October 2003
- Genre: Pop; big beat; R&B
- Length: 3:38
- Label: Universal; Island
- Songwriters: Brian Higgins; Miranda Cooper; Tim Powell; Nick Coler; Niara Scarlett; Keisha Buchanan; Mutya Buena; Heidi Range
- Producers: Brian Higgins; Xenomania; Jeremy Wheatley

Sugababes singles chronology
"Shape" (2003)	"Hole in the Head" (2003)	"Too Lost in You" (2003)

Music video
- "Hole in the Head" on YouTube

"Hole in the Head" is a song performed by British girl group Sugababes, released on 13 October 2003 as the lead single from their third studio album, Three. It was written by Brian Higgins, Miranda Cooper, Tim Powell, Nick Coler, Niara Scarlett, Keisha Buchanan, Mutya Buena, and Heidi Range, and co-produced by Higgins and Jeremy Wheatley. The song was met with acclaim from critics and was a commercial success, entering at the top of the UK Singles Chart. Outside the United Kingdom, the single peaked within the top ten of the charts in ten other countries. It became their only single to chart in the United States, peaking at number ninety-six on the Billboard Hot 100 and topping the Billboard Dance Club Play chart.

"Hole in the Head"
A 23 second audio sample of "Hole in the Head".

== Background and development ==
"Hole in the Head" was written by Brian Higgins, Miranda Cooper, Tim Powell, Nick Coler and Niara Scarlett, in collaboration with the Sugababes' members—Keisha Buchanan, Mutya Buena and Heidi Range, for the group's third studio album, Three. Higgins and Jeremy Wheatley produced the song in conjunction with the songwriting and production team Xenomania, which was founded by Higgins himself. Wheatley also completed the song's mixing process at the Townhouse Studios in London.

== Composition ==
"Hole in the Head" is an uptempo pop song, with influences of R&B. K. Ross Hoffman of Allmusic described it as "a slice of bouncy, slightly off-kilter up-tempo pop". According to the digital sheet music published by EMI Music Publishing, "Hole in the Head" was composed in the key of F-sharp minor at a tempo of 125 beats per minute.". The Sugababes' vocal range in the song spans from the lower note of F_{3} to the higher note of D_{5}. It follows the chord progression Bm—F♯m—A—E. "Hole in the Head" draws musical influences from German vocal group Boney M. and the "swagger rock" of American recording artist Madonna. The song incorporates dance beats, guitars and techno effects. "Hole in the Head" is reminiscent of the Sugababes' previous single "Round Round", which was also produced by Xenomania. Tom Ewing of Freaky Trigger describes its sound as "skiffle-y, schaffle-y, ska-ish acoustic big beat", similarly to Girls Aloud's "Love Machine" (2004), another Xenomania production.

== Critical reception ==
"Hole in the Head" received critical acclaim from music critics. K. Ross Hoffman of AllMusic compared the song to the Sugababes' previous number one single "Freak like Me" and called it "no less enjoyable" than the latter. A writer from NME wrote that "Hole in the Head" showcases the Sugababes' "twin strengths", and applauded their vocal performance in the song. The Guardian's Dorian Lynskey praised Xenomania's production of "Hole in the Head", as well as the song's "sling-yer-hook skank". Peter Robinson of the same publication described the song as an "incendiary" lead single. Alan Braidwood of the BBC regarded the song as "quality pop" in conjunction with several other tracks from the album. Al Fox, also from the BBC, described the song's hook as "instantaneous splendour". Fiona Shepherd of The Scotsman praised "Hole in the Head" for its catchiness. Nick Southall of Stylus Magazine noted that the Sugababes utilised "irresistible" harmonies in the song. Dan Gennoe of Yahoo! Music called the track "seductive", while Alex Fletcher from Digital Spy noted the song's "spiky attitude". Pat Blashill of Rolling Stone wrote that "Hole in the Head" "clip-clops along like Destiny's Child on diet soda".

== Commercial performance ==
"Hole in the Head" gained popular radio and television airplay after its release in the UK and was in close competition with "Turn Me On" by Kevin Lyttle for the number one position on the UK Singles Chart. The song eventually debuted at number one on the UK Singles Chart with sales of 58,452 copies, ending the Black Eyed Peas' six-week run at the top with their single "Where Is the Love?". "Hole in the Head" spent thirteen weeks on the chart, and sold 185,000 copies in the UK by April 2010, ranking as their sixth highest-selling single in the country. It was placed 76th on the UK's list of most popular radio songs of the 2000s. "Hole in the Head" debuted and peaked at number two on the Irish Singles Chart, a position it held for two consecutive weeks. It was barred from the pole position by the Black Eyed Peas' "Where Is The Love?".

The song debuted at number nine on the Danish Singles Chart issue dated 24 October 2003. Two weeks later, it peaked at number one, and in turn became the Sugababes' first and to-date only number-one single in Denmark. "Hole in the Head" entered the Dutch Top 40 chart at number 22 and peaked at number two for three non-consecutive weeks. The song spent 12 weeks in the chart's top ten, and was placed 23rd on its 2003 list of best-performing singles. On the Norwegian Singles Chart, "Hole in the Head" debuted at number six and peaked at number two for three non-consecutive weeks. It spent a broken fourteen weeks in the chart's top ten. The song reached number five on the Austrian Singles Chart and became the group's highest-charting single in Austria since "Overload", which peaked at number three in 2001.

"Hole in the Head" made its first appearance on the Swedish Singles Chart on 5 December 2003 at number 17. The song peaked at number seven in the issue dated 23 January 2004 and became the Sugababes' first top-ten entry in Sweden. It peaked at number eight on the Swiss Singles Chart for two consecutive weeks, and number nine on the German Singles Chart. "Hole in the Head" became a top-twenty hit on the Belgium (Flanders) Ultratop chart, Finnish Singles Chart, and Hungarian Singles Chart. The single debuted and peaked at number 25 on the Australian Singles Chart, where it charted for 12 weeks. It was more successful on the New Zealand Singles Chart, where it peaked at number 11 for two non-consecutive weeks and charted for a total of 15 weeks. Upon its release in the United States, "Hole in the Head" peaked at number one on the Billboard Dance Club Play chart, number 24 on the Billboard Mainstream Top 40 chart, and number 96 on the Billboard Hot 100 chart. The song debuted at number 98 on the Billboard Hot 100 issue dated week ending 12 June 2004 and rose to number 96 the following week, before dropping off the chart.

== Music video ==
The music video for "Hole in the Head" was directed by Matthew Rolston and filmed on various locations in London in September 2003. The video shows the girls wearing heavy make up while dressed in gothic-like clothing and accessories and dancing around. They are also shown dating a rock band called Erased with whom they go to a gig. The girls discover the band getting intimate with other girls during the show. In the end, while the trio is performing in front of the crowd, the girls come out first grabbing the guys and throwing them off the stage and start damaging the instruments. There are 2 other versions of the music video. One is an uncensored version of the video available on the CD single with extra footage. Aside from it being the original explicit version of the song, there is also a scene where Buchanan gives the middle finger to the camera. Second being the US version of the music video with extra scenes of the girls in front of a black background replacing the more 'violent' scenes.

== Track listings ==
- UK CD1; European maxi-CD single; Australian CD single
1. "Hole in the Head"
2. "Who"
3. "Hole in the Head" (Full Intention vocal mix)
4. "Hole in the Head" (video)
- UK CD2
1. "Hole in the Head" (clean radio edit)
2. "This Ain't a Party Thing"
3. "Hole in the Head" (Gravitas mix)
- European CD single and German mini CD single
1. "Hole in the Head" (clean radio edit) – 3:37
2. "Who" – 3:50
- US CD single
1. "Hole in the Head" (radio edit) – 3:38
2. "Hole in the Head" (Armand van Helden remix) – 7:32

== Personnel ==
Personnel are adapted from the liner notes of Overloaded: The Singles Collection.

- Songwriting – Brian Higgins, Miranda Cooper, Tim Powell, Nick Coler, Niara Scarlett, Keisha Buchanan, Mutya Buena, Heidi Range
- Production – Brian Higgins, Xenomania, Jeremy Wheatley
- Additional vocal production – Yoad Nevo
- Mixing – Jeremy Wheatley at the Townhouse Studios
- Keyboards – Brian Higgins, Tim Powell
- Programming – Tim Powell, Nick Coler
- Guitars – Nick Coler, Shawn Lee
- Vocals – Keisha Buchanan, Mutya Buena, Heidi Range

== Charts ==
=== Weekly charts ===
Chart (2003–2005)	Peak position
Australia (ARIA)	25
Australian Urban (ARIA)	13
Austria (Ö3 Austria Top 40)	5
Belgium (Ultratop 50 Flanders)	20
Belgium (Ultratip Bubbling Under Wallonia)	11
CIS Airplay (TopHit)	29
Croatia International Airplay (HRT) (Note: Only a partial archive of the Croatian charts is available so it is possible that the single had a higher peak.)	4
Denmark (Tracklisten)	1
Europe (Eurochart Hot 100)	3
Finland (Suomen virallinen lista)	11
Germany (GfK)	9
Greece (IFPI)	16
Hungary (Rádiós Top 40)	17
Hungary (Dance Top 40)	7
Ireland (IRMA)	2
Italy (FIMI)	23
Netherlands (Dutch Top 40)	2
Netherlands (Single Top 100)	3
New Zealand (Recorded Music NZ)	11
Norway (VG-lista)	2
Romania (Romanian Top 100)	53
Russia Airplay (TopHit)	11
Scottish Singles Sales (Official Charts)	1
Sweden (Sverigetopplistan)	7
Switzerland (Schweizer Hitparade)	8
UK Singles (Official Charts)	1
UK Airplay (Music Week)	1
US Billboard Hot 100	96
US Dance Club Songs (Billboard)	1
US Dance Singles Sales (Billboard) Armand van Helden remix	2
US Dance Airplay (Billboard)	22
US Pop Airplay (Billboard)	24

=== Year-end charts ===
Chart (2003)	Position
CIS Airplay (TopHit)	44
Germany (Media Control GfK)	94
Ireland (IRMA)	38
Netherlands (Dutch Top 40)	23
Netherlands (Single Top 100)	33
Russia Airplay (TopHit)	22
Sweden (Hitlistan)	98
Switzerland (Schweizer Hitparade)	51
UK Singles (OCC)	43
UK Airplay (Music Week)	16

Chart (2004)	Position
Sweden (Hitlistan)	74
UK Airplay (Music Week)	48
US Dance Club Play (Billboard)	20
US Dance Singles Sales (Billboard)	15

Chart (2005)	Position
US Dance Singles Sales (Billboard)	25

== Certifications ==
Region	Certification	Certified units/sales
United Kingdom (BPI)	Silver	200,000^{^}
^{^} Shipments figures based on certification alone.

== Release history ==
Region	Date	Format(s)	Label(s)	Ref.
United Kingdom	13 October 2003	CD	Universal; Island	
Australia	27 October 2003	CD	Universal; Island	
United States	29 March 2004	Contemporary hit radio	Interscope	

== See also ==
- List of number-one dance singles of 2004 (U.S.)
