= Mutya Buena discography =

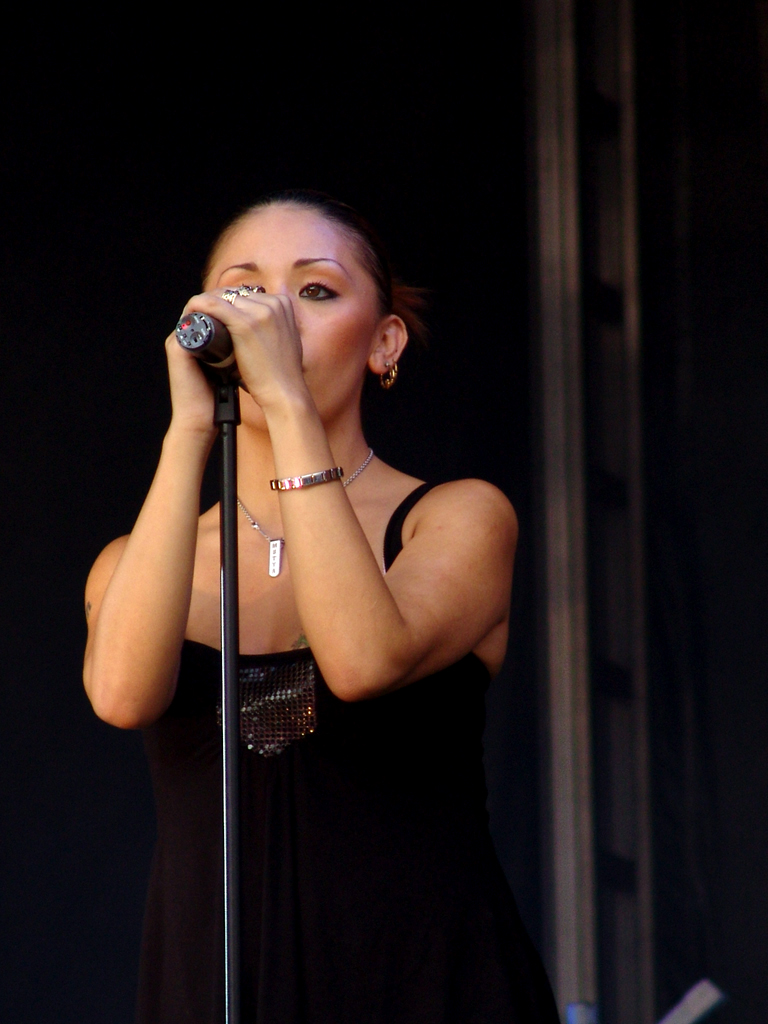
- Buena performing with Sugababes at Bristol Ashton Court on 13 August 2004.
- Studio albums: 1
- Singles: 16
- Music videos: 12

Mutya Buena is an English singer best known as a founding member of Sugababes. After departing the Subababes in 2005, Buena embarked on her solo career, releasing her debut album Real Girl in June 2007. As a solo artist she has released one studio album and twelve singles (including eight as a featured artist) and has collaborated with George Michael, Groove Armada and Amy Winehouse among others. In 2010 Buena also contributed five tracks to the collaborative album Sound of Camden. In July 2012 Buena reunited with the other original members of the Sugababes, Keisha Buchanan and Siobhan Donaghy, under the new name of Mutya Keisha Siobhan (abbreviated to "MKS"). Following the cancellation of their first album in 2013, the group legally regained the "Sugababes" name in 2019 and released their first music together as Sugababes since 2000's One Touch album: the DJ Spoony-produced track "Flowers".

== Studio album ==
List of albums, with selected chart positions and certifications
| Title | Details | Peak chart positions | | | | Certifications |
| Title | Details | UK | IRE | NLD | SWI | Certifications |
|---|---|---|---|---|---|---|
| Real Girl | Released: 4 June 2007; Label: Island; Formats: CD, digital download | 10 | 51 | 71 | 66 | BPI: Gold |

== Singles ==
=== As lead artist ===
List of singles as lead artist, with selected chart positions and album name
| Title | Year | Peak chart positions | | | | | | | | Certifications | Album |
| Title | Year | UK | AUS | AUT | FIN | GER | IRE | NLD | SWI | Certifications | Album |
|---|---|---|---|---|---|---|---|---|---|---|---|
| "Real Girl" | 2007 | 2 | 59 | 46 | 6 | 40 | 25 | 9 | 53 | BPI: Silver | Real Girl |
| "Song 4 Mutya (Out of Control)" (featuring Groove Armada) | 2007 | 8 | 24 | — | 12 | — | 26 | 96 | — | | Real Girl |
| "Just a Little Bit" | 2007 | 65 | — | — | — | — | — | — | — | | Real Girl |
| "B Boy Baby" (featuring Amy Winehouse) | 2007 | 73 | — | — | — | — | — | — | — | | Real Girl |
| "Black Valentine" (with Electric Pineapple) | 2020 | — | — | — | — | — | — | — | — | | |
| "The One" (with Ryuken) | 2021 | — | — | — | — | — | — | — | — | | |
| "Feels Good" (with Ryuken) | 2022 | — | — | — | — | — | — | — | — | | |
| "All I Own" (with Laidback Luke) | 2023 | — | — | — | — | — | — | — | — | | |
| "No Lies" | 2024 | — | — | — | — | — | — | — | — | | |

=== As featured artist ===
| Title | Year | Chart peak positions | | | | | Album |
| Title | Year | UK | AUT | IRE | NLD | SWI | Album |
|---|---|---|---|---|---|---|---|
| "This Is Not Real Love" (George Michael featuring Mutya Buena) | 2006 | 15 | 62 | 27 | 32 | 36 | Twenty Five |
| "With You" (Ashley Walters featuring Mutya Buena) | 2008 | — | — | — | — | — | Non-album singles |
| "Fallin'" (Agent X featuring Mutya Buena and Ultra) | 2009 | — | — | — | — | — | Non-album singles |
| "Give Back" (Tah Mac featuring Mutya Buena) | 2009 | — | — | — | — | — | Welcome 2 Tahland |
| "Give Me Love" (Paul Morrell featuring Mutya Buena) | 2011 | — | — | — | — | — | Non-album singles |
| "Be OK" (City Boy Soul featuring Mutya Buena) | 2011 | — | — | — | — | — | Non-album singles |
| "Game Over" (L€GACY featuring Mutya Buena, RockwellXL, JSTN, Rico Flames) | 2018 | — | — | — | — | — | Non-album singles |
| "Your Love Your Way" (Snowman Baby featuring Mutya Buena) | 2021 | — | — | — | — | — | Non-album singles |
| "Fashion" (Snowman Baby featuring Mutya Buena) | 2022 | — | — | — | — | — | Non-album singles |

== Music videos ==
| Song | Year | Director(s) |
|---|---|---|
| "Real Girl" | 2007 | Max & Dania |
| "Song 4 Mutya (Out of Control)" | 2007 | Simon Henwood |
| "Song 4 Mutya (Out of Control)" (alternate version) | 2007 | Groove Armada |
| "Just a Little Bit" | 2007 | Max & Dania |
| "B Boy Baby" | 2007 | Nick Bartleet |
| "With You" | 2008 | Dewi Bruce |
| "Fallin'" | 2009 | Phil Griffin |
| "Give Me Love" | 2011 | Djonny Chen |
| "Give Back" | 2011 | Skywall |
| "Game Over" | 2018 | |
| "Black Valentine" | 2020 | Tom Cockram |
