= List of UK top-ten singles in 2007 =

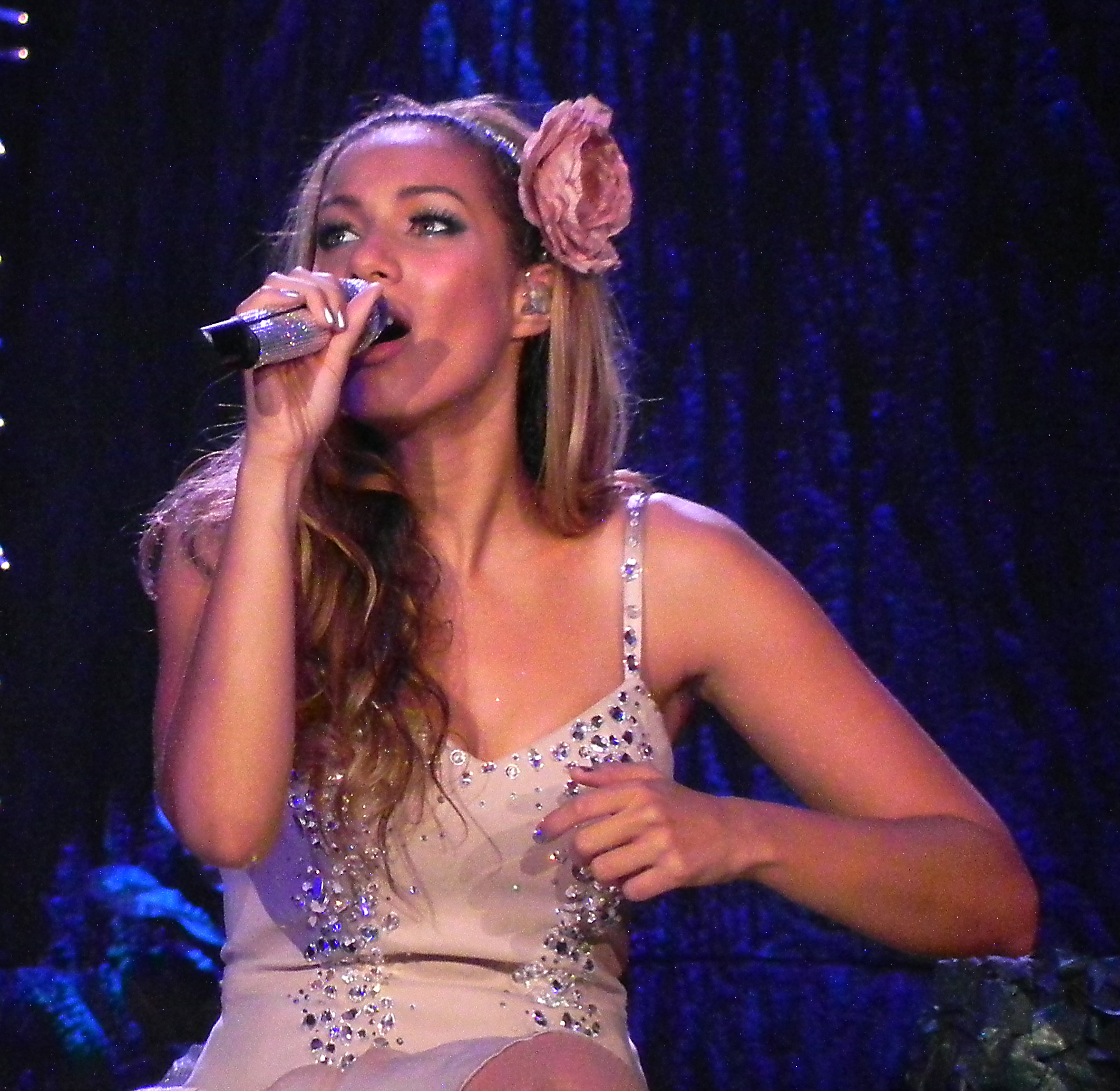
Leona Lewis had the biggest selling single of 2007 with "Bleeding Love", the first release since her X Factor victory apart from winners single "A Moment Like This". Both singles occupied the top spot in 2007.

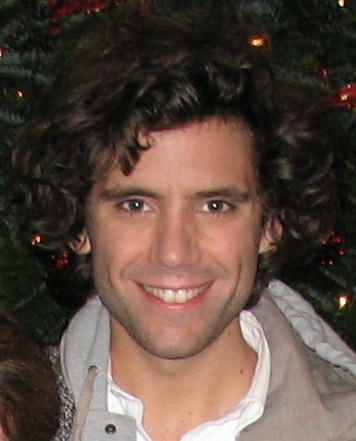
Mika had four top 10 singles this year. His debut single "Grace Kelly" peaked at number-one in January.

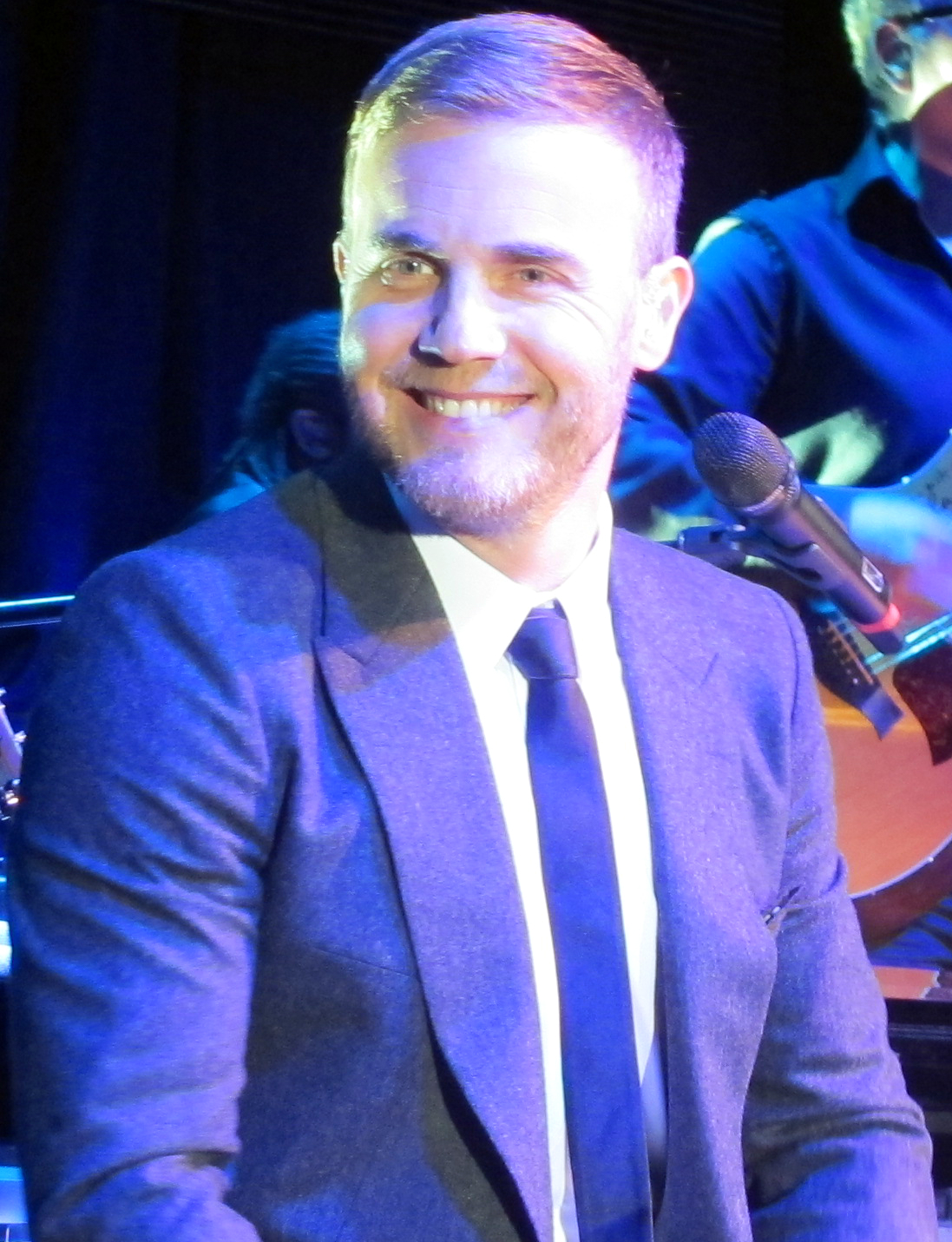
Take That (group member Gary Barlow pictured) went to number-two with "Rule the World", a song featured in the film Stardust. They also had top 10 singles in 2007 with "Patience" and "Shine".

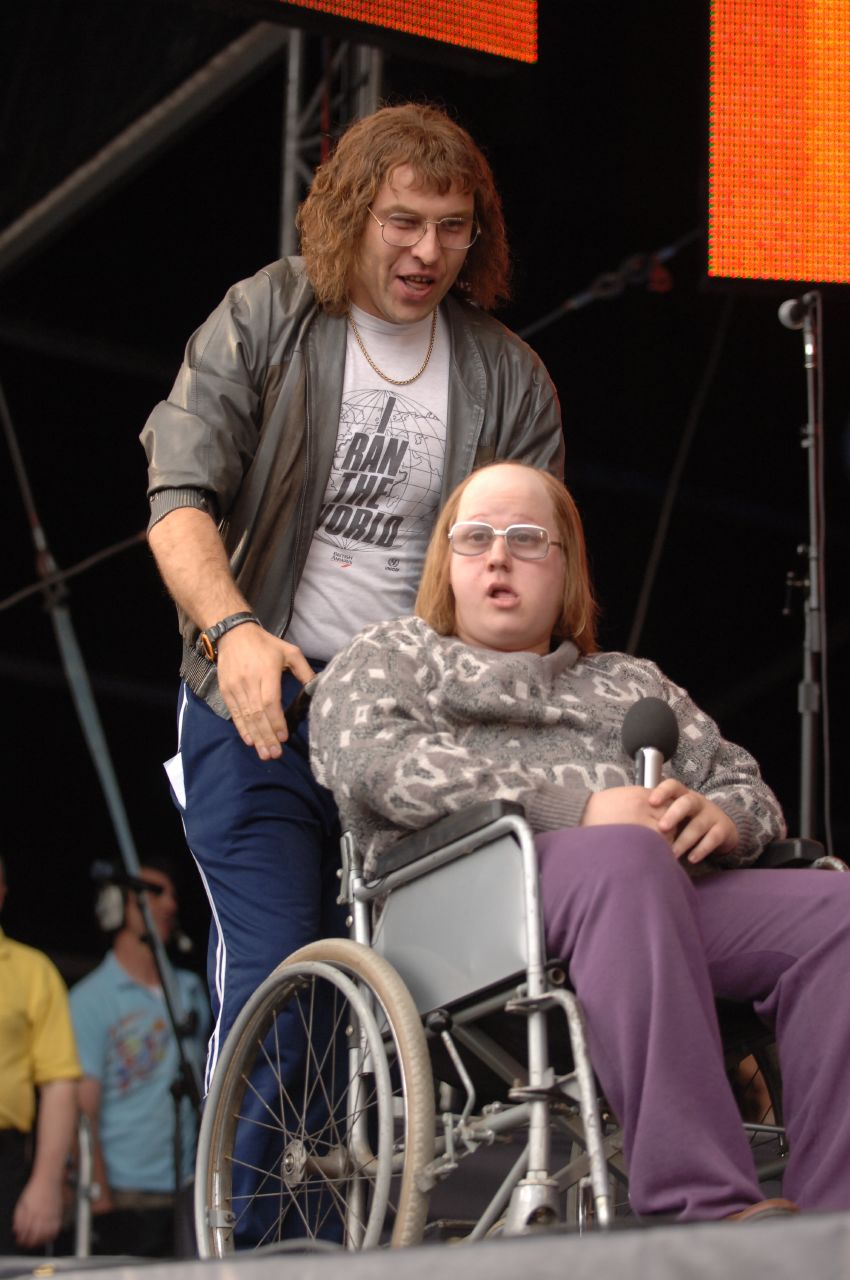
Matt Lucas (pictured in wheelchair in character as Andy Pipkin) and Peter Kay collaborated with The Proclaimers on the official Comic Relief single "(I'm Gonna Be) 500 Miles", which spent three weeks at number-one.

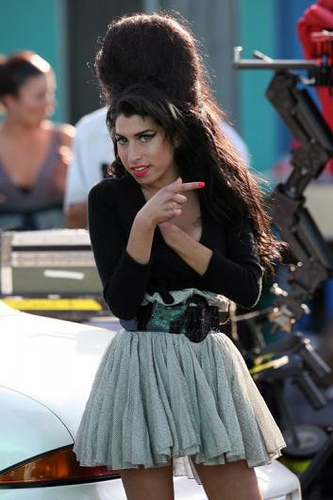
Amy Winehouse covered The Zutons song "Valerie", providing the vocals for Mark Ronson's production and reaching number two in October.

The UK Singles Chart is one of many music charts compiled by the Official Charts Company that calculates the best-selling singles of the week in the United Kingdom. Since 2004 the chart has been based on the sales of both physical singles and digital downloads, with airplay figures excluded from the official chart. This list shows singles that peaked in the Top 10 of the UK Singles Chart during 2007, as well as singles which peaked in 2006 and 2008 but were in the top 10 in 2007. The entry date is when the single appeared in the top 10 for the first time (week ending, as published by the Official Charts Company, which is six days after the chart is announced).

One-hundred and thirty-four singles were in the top ten in 2007. Eight singles from 2006 remained in the top 10 for several weeks at the beginning of the year. "Crank That (Soulja Boy)" by Soulja Boy Tell'em was the only single from 2007 to reach its peak in 2008. Twenty-eight artists scored multiple entries in the top 10 in 2007. Calvin Harris, Mark Ronson, Mika, OneRepublic and Scouting for Girls were among the many artists who achieved their first UK charting top 10 single in 2007.

New rules were introduced this year to alter how single downloads are counted, with a physical copy no longer having to be currently available in the shops for a single to be eligible for the charts. Snow Patrol were the most high-profile act to benefit from the change, with their song "Chasing Cars" returning to the top 10, months after first release the previous year. "Baby's Coming Back"/"Transylvania" by McFly also became only the third single in chart history to fall straight from number-one out of the top ten the following week.

The 2006 Christmas number-one, "A Moment Like This" by 2006 X Factor winner Leona Lewis, remained at number-one for the first three weeks of 2007. The first new number-one single of the year was "Grace Kelly" by Mika. Overall, eighteen different singles peaked at number-one in 2007, with Leona LewisSugababes and Timbaland (2) having the joint most singles hit that position.

== Background ==
=== Multiple entries ===
One-hundred and thirty-four singles charted in the top 10 in 2007, with one-hundred and twenty-five singles reaching their peak this year (including the re-entries "All I Want for Christmas is You" and "Fairytale of New York" which charted in previous years but reached peaks on their latest chart run).

Twenty-eight artists scored multiple entries in the top 10 in 2007. American rapper Akon, fellow countryman producer Timbaland and Lebanon-born British singer Mika shared the position of most top 10 entries in 2007 with four each, although Akon's "Smack That" - a collaboration with Eminem - peaked in 2006. Mika's debut number-one single "Grace Kelly" acted as a breakthrough for the singer, who won the BBC's Sound of 2007 poll, as he went on to record three further top 10 entries during the year ("Love Today", "Big Girl (You Are Beautiful)" and "Happy Ending").

Akon's other hit solo singles in 2007 included the number three peak "I Wanna Love You" in February and "Don't Matter" which reached the same spot in May. He also featured on the number two single "The Sweet Escape" by Gwen Stefani, just missing out on number-one in March. Timbaland had two number-one singles in 2007: "Give It to Me" featuring Nelly Furtado and Justin Timberlake in April, followed by "The Way I Are with Keri Hilson in July. His feature on 50 Cent's "Ayo Technology" (also featuring Justin Timberlake) reached number two, and "Apologize" with OneRepublic peaked one spot lower.

Three British acts in the form of Girls Aloud, Mark Ronson and Take That all achieved three top 10 entries in 2007, along with German dance group Cascada and American singer Justin Timberlake. Take That, who only returned unexpectedly as a four-piece in late 2006 following a ten-year hiatus, had a very successful year, as "Shine" was a number-one single and "Rule the World" reached number two behind Leona Lewis' "Bleeding Love" in October 2007. "Patience" had also reached number-one in 2006 and remained in the top 10 at the beginning of 2007.

Girls Aloud added another number-one to their collection: "Walk This Way", a cover of the Run DMC and Aerosmith song, for Comic Relief with Sugababes. "Sexy! No No No..." peaked at number five in September, while "Call the Shots" ended their year in December, reaching number three. Mark Ronson's "Stop Me" was a number two entry in April. He produced Lily Allen's cover of "Oh My God" originally by Kaiser Chiefs, which reached number eight in July, as well as Amy Winehouse's interpretation of The Zutons' "Valerie", peaking at number two in October.

Dance group Cascada's total included "Truly Madly Deeply" from the end of 2006, when it had peaked at number four. "Miracle" landed at number eight in March and "What Hurts the Most" sneaked into the top 10 in the week before Christmas. Justin Timberlake had one more entry in addition to "Give It to Me" and "Ayo Technology". "What Goes Around.../...Comes Around" made it to number four in March.

Barbadian singer Rihanna was one of a number of artists with two top-ten entries, including number-one single "Umbrella", which stayed at the top of the chart for ten weeks. Avril Lavigne, Calvin Harris, Fedde Le Grand, Gym Class Heroes, Leona Lewis, Mutya Buena, Nelly Furtado and Snow Patrol were among the other artists who had multiple top 10 entries in 2007.

=== Change to chart rules ===
The new chart rules regarding downloads, introduced at the start of the year, enabled Scottish/Irish band Snow Patrol to re-enter the top 10 with "Chasing Cars, a song that originally charted in summer 2006, without a physical copy of the record being in the shops at that time.

=== McFly number-one's rapid drop ===
"Baby's Coming Back"/"Transylvania" by McFly joined a unique club of singles whose only one week in the top 10 was at number-one. It repeated the feat of "One Night"/"I Got Stung" and "It's Now or Never", both by Elvis Presley, from 2005. It held the record for the sharpest fall from number-one until "A Bridge over You" by Lewisham and Greenwich NHS Choir (2015) took this over in 2015 - its drop to number 29 was beaten by the charity single, which fell to number 29 after one week at the top of the chart.

=== Chart debuts ===
Forty-seven artists achieved their first top 10 single in 2007, either as a lead or featured artist. Of these, five went on to record another hit single that year: Calvin Harris, The Enemy, Groove Armada, Gym Class Heroes and The Hoosiers. Mark Ronson scored two more top 10 singles in 2007. Mika had three other entries in his breakthrough year.

The following table (collapsed on desktop site) does not include acts who had previously charted as part of a group and secured their first top 10 solo single.

Artist	Number of top 10s	First entry	Chart position	Other entries
Mika	4	"Grace Kelly"	1	"Big Girl (You Are Beautiful)" (9), "Happy Ending" (7), "Love Today" (6)
Just Jack	1	"Starz in Their Eyes"	2	—
The View	1	"Same Jeans"	3	—
Jamie T	1	"Calm Down Dearest"	9	—
Mason	1	"Perfect (Exceeder)"	3	—
Princess Superstar	1	"Perfect (Exceeder)"	3	—
Klaxons	1	"Golden Skans"	7	—
The Fray	1	"How to Save a Life"	4	—
The Gossip	1	"Standing in the Way of Control"	2	—
Camille Jones	1	"The Creeps"	7	—
Andy Pipkin	1	"(I'm Gonna Be) 500 Miles"	1	—
Calvin Harris	2	"Acceptable in the 80s"	10	"The Girls" (3)
Alex Gaudino	1	"Destination Calabria"	4	—
Maxïmo Park	1	"Our Velocity"	9	—
Mark Ronson	3	"Stop Me"	2	"Oh My God" (8), "Valerie" (2)
Daniel Merriweather	1	"Stop Me"	2	—
The Enemy	2	"Away from Here"	8	"Had Enough" (4)
Gym Class Heroes	2	"Cupid's Chokehold"	3	"Clothes Off!!" (5)
Groove Armada	2	"Get Down"	9	"Song 4 Mutya (Out of Control)" (8)
Stush	1	"Get Down"	9	—
Hellogoodbye	1	"Here (In Your Arms)"	4	—
The Twang	1	"Either Way"	8	—
Reverend and the Makers	1	"Heavyweight Champion of the World"	8	—
Lee Mead	1	"Any Dream Will Do"	2	—
Kate Nash	1	"Foundations"	2	—
The Hoosiers	2	"Worried About Ray"	5	"Goodbye Mr A" (4)
Jack Peñate	1	"Torn on the Platform"	7	—
Kleerup	1	"With Every Heartbeat"	1	—
Newton Faulkner	1	"Dream Catch Me"	7	—
Plain White T's	1	"Hey There Delilah"	2	—
Axwell	1	"I Found U"	6	—
Max'C	1	"I Found U"	6	—
Sean Kingston	1	"Beautiful Girls"	1	—
Freaks	1	"The Creeps (Get on the Dancefloor)"	9	—
Scouting for Girls	1	"She's So Lovely"	7	—
Ida Corr	1	"Let Me Think About It"	2	—
Feist	1	"1234"	8	—
OneRepublic	1	"Apologize"	3	—
Freemasons	1	"Uninvited"	8	—
Bailey Tzuke	1	"Uninvited"	8	—
Runrig	1	"Loch Lomond (Hampden Remix)"	9	—
Tartan Army	1	"Loch Lomond (Hampden Remix)"	9	—
T2	1	"Heartbroken"	2	—
Jodie Aysha	1	"Heartbroken"	2	—
Soulja Boy Tell'em	1	"Crank That (Soulja Boy)"	2 ^{[A]}	—
Eva Cassidy	1	"What a Wonderful World"	1	—
Leon Jackson	1	"When You Believe"	1	—

Notes

Sharam from the American electronic music duo Deep Dish had his first charting top 10 in his own right when his cover of "Party All the Time" (known as "PATT (Party All the Time)") reached number eight in January 2007. Peter Kay featured on The Proclaimers new version of "I'm Gonna Be (500 Miles)" as his Phoenix Nights character Brian Potter. The Comic Relief single went to number-one and also featured Matt Lucas playing Andy Pipkin from Little Britain. Kay had previously been credited on "Is This the Way to Amarillo" in 2005, but this was his first chart hit as Potter.

Patrick Stump of Fall Out Boy featured on the Gym Class Heroes top three single "Cupid's Chokehold", his first chart success outside the band. Red Rat appeared on Groove Armada's "Get Down", alongside Stush, although he was not officially credit on the single release.

Mutya Buena, formerly of Sugababes, had her first solo top 10 singles in 2007 with "Real Girl" and her featured credit on Groove Armada's "Song 4 Mutya (Out of Control)". Russell Small from Freemasons had previously been a part of the production duo Phats & Small, peaking at numbers 2 and 7 with the singles "Turn Around" (1999) and "Feel Good" (2000) respectively.

=== Songs from films ===
Original songs from various films entered the top 10 throughout the year. These included "Signal Fire" (from Spider-Man 3) and "Rule the World" (Stardust). "When You Believe" from The Prince of Egypt was also covered by Leon Jackson as his winning song on The X Factor.

=== Charity singles ===
A number of singles recorded for charity reached the top 10 in the charts in 2007. The Comic Relief single was a new version of The Proclaimers hit "(I'm Gonna Be) 500 Miles", featuring Peter Kay and Matt Lucas as their characters Brian Potter (from Phoenix Nights and Andy Pipkin (Little Britain) respectively, peaking at number one on 31 March 2007.

Runrig and the Tartan Army, made up of Scotland football fans, recorded an unofficial Children in Need single for 2007, "Loch Lomond". It reached number nine on 24 November 2007, two places higher than the official Children in Need single, "Headlines (Friendship Never Ends)" by Spice Girls, which missed the top 10. Proceeds from the sales of "Any Dream Will Do" by Lee Mead also went towards Children in Need. The song peaked at number two on 30 June 2007.

=== Best-selling singles ===
Leona Lewis had the best-selling single of the year with "Bleeding Love". The single spent eleven weeks in the top 10 (including seven weeks at number one), sold over 787,000 copies and was certified platinum by the BPI. "Umbrella" by Rihanna featuring Jay Z came in second place, selling about 511,000 copies and losing out by around 276,000 sales. Mika's "Grace Kelly", "When You Believe" from Leon Jackson and "Rule the World" by Take That made up the top five. Singles by Sugababes, Timbaland featuring Keri Hilson and D.O.E., The Proclaimers featuring Brian Potter and Andy Pipkin, Mark Ronson featuring Amy Winehouse, and Kaiser Chiefs were also in the top ten best-selling singles of the year.

== Top-ten singles ==
Key

Symbol	Meaning
‡	Single peaked in 2006 but still in chart in 2007.
♦	Single released in 2007 but peaked in 2008.
(#)	Year-end top ten single position and rank
Entered	The date that the single first appeared in the chart.
Peak	Highest position that the single reached in the UK Singles Chart.

Entered (week ending)	Weeks in top 10	Single	Artist	Peak	Peak reached (week ending)	Weeks at peak
Singles in 2006
19 August 2006	7	"Chasing Cars" ‡ ^{[B]}	Snow Patrol	6	16 September 2006	1
25 November 2006	9	"Smack That" ‡	Akon featuring Eminem	1	25 November 2006	1
25 November 2006	11	"Patience" ‡	Take That	1	2 December 2006	4
9 December 2006	8	"Boogie 2nite" ‡	Booty Luv	2	16 December 2006	1
16 December 2006	3	"Wind It Up" ‡	Gwen Stefani	3	23 December 2006	1
23 December 2006	5	"Truly Madly Deeply" ‡	Cascada	4	23 December 2006	1
23 December 2006	4	"You Know My Name" ‡	Chris Cornell	7	23 December 2006	1
30 December 2006	5	"A Moment Like This" ‡	Leona Lewis	1	30 December 2006	4
Singles in 2007
6 January 2007	1	"Different World"	Iron Maiden	3	6 January 2007	1
6 January 2007	3	"PATT (Party All the Time)"	Sharam	8	6 January 2007	2
13 January 2007	4	"Proper Education"	Eric Prydz vs. Floyd	2	13 January 2007	2
13 January 2007	1	"Window in the Skies"	U2	4	13 January 2007	1
20 January 2007	11	"Grace Kelly" (#3)	Mika	1	27 January 2007	5
20 January 2007	7	"Starz in Their Eyes"	Just Jack	2	27 January 2007	2
20 January 2007	6	"Too Little Too Late"	JoJo	4	27 January 2007	2
27 January 2007	4	"Same Jeans"	The View	3	27 January 2007	1
27 January 2007	2	"I Luv U"	The Ordinary Boys	7	27 January 2007	1
27 January 2007	1	"Calm Down Dearest"	Jamie T	9	27 January 2007	1
3 February 2007	4	"Perfect (Exceeder)"	Mason vs. Princess Superstar	3	3 February 2007	1
3 February 2007	5	"This Ain't a Scene, It's an Arms Race"	Fall Out Boy	2	10 February 2007	1
3 February 2007	2	"Golden Skans"	Klaxons	7	3 February 2007	1
3 February 2007	1	"Famous Last Words"	My Chemical Romance	8	3 February 2007	1
10 February 2007	1	"The Prayer"	Bloc Party	4	10 February 2007	1
10 February 2007	5	"I Wanna Love You"	Akon featuring Snoop Dogg	3	24 February 2007	1
10 February 2007	11	"How to Save a Life"	The Fray	4	14 April 2007	1
17 February 2007	10	"Ruby" (#10)	Kaiser Chiefs	1	3 March 2007	1
17 February 2007	11	"The Sweet Escape"	Gwen Stefani featuring Akon	2	17 March 2007	2
3 March 2007	3	"Lil Star"	Kelis featuring CeeLo Green	3	3 March 2007	1
3 March 2007	1	"Catch You"	Sophie Ellis-Bextor	8	3 March 2007	1
3 March 2007	6	"Shine"	Take That	1	10 March 2007	2
10 March 2007	2	"Standing in the Way of Control"	Gossip	7	10 March 2007	1
10 March 2007	1	"Miracle"	Cascada	8	10 March 2007	1
10 March 2007	4	"What Goes Around... Comes Around"	Justin Timberlake	4	17 March 2007	1
17 March 2007	2	"The Creeps"	Camille Jones vs. Fedde Le Grand	7	17 March 2007	1
17 March 2007	1	"Say It Right"	Nelly Furtado	10	17 March 2007	1
24 March 2007	2	"Walk This Way" ^{[C]}	Sugababes vs. Girls Aloud	1	24 March 2007	1
24 March 2007	6	"(I'm Gonna Be) 500 Miles" (#8) ^{[C]}	The Proclaimers featuring Brian Potter & Andy Pipkin	1	31 March 2007	3
24 March 2007	1	"Acceptable in the 80s"	Calvin Harris	10	24 March 2007	1
31 March 2007	8	"Girlfriend"	Avril Lavigne	2	7 April 2007	2
31 March 2007	4	"Destination Calabria"	Alex Gaudino featuring Crystal Waters	4	7 April 2007	1
31 March 2007	1	"Our Velocity"	Maxïmo Park	9	31 March 2007	1
31 March 2007	4	"Glamorous"	Fergie featuring Ludacris	6	7 April 2007	1
14 April 2007	5	"Stop Me"	Mark Ronson featuring Daniel Merriweather	2	21 April 2007	1
14 April 2007	10	"Give It to Me"	Timbaland featuring Nelly Furtado & Justin Timberlake	1	21 April 2007	1
14 April 2007	12	"Beautiful Liar"	Beyoncé & Shakira	1	28 April 2007	3
28 April 2007	2	"Brianstorm"	Arctic Monkeys	2	28 April 2007	1
28 April 2007	3	"Because of You"	Ne-Yo	4	5 May 2007	1
28 April 2007	2	"I Wanna Have Your Babies"	Natasha Bedingfield	7	28 April 2007	1
28 April 2007	1	"Away From Here"	The Enemy	8	28 April 2007	1
5 May 2007	2	"Love Today"	Mika	6	5 May 2007	1
5 May 2007	9	"Cupid's Chokehold"	Gym Class Heroes featuring Patrick Stump	3	12 May 2007	1
5 May 2007	1	"Closer"	Travis	10	5 May 2007	1
12 May 2007	2	"Your Love Alone Is Not Enough"	Manic Street Preachers	2	12 May 2007	1
12 May 2007	1	"Get Down"	Groove Armada featuring Stush & Red Rat	9	12 May 2007	1
12 May 2007	6	"Here (In Your Arms)"	Hellogoodbye	4	2 June 2007	2
19 May 2007	1	"Baby's Coming Back"/"Transylvania"	McFly	1	19 May 2007	1
19 May 2007	4	"Don't Matter"	Akon	3	19 May 2007	1
19 May 2007	2	"Flying the Flag (For You)" ^{[D]}	Scooch	5	19 May 2007	1
19 May 2007	1	"What I've Done"	Linkin Park	6	19 May 2007	1
19 May 2007	1	"Take Control"	Amerie	10	19 May 2007	1
26 May 2007	13	"Umbrella" (#2)	Rihanna featuring Jay-Z	1	26 May 2007	10
26 May 2007	4	"Makes Me Wonder"	Maroon 5	2	26 May 2007	2
26 May 2007	2	"Signal Fire"	Snow Patrol	4	26 May 2007	1
26 May 2007	2	"Shine"	Booty Luv	10	26 May 2007	2
2 June 2007	4	"Real Girl"	Mutya Buena	2	9 June 2007	2
9 June 2007	1	"Either Way"	The Twang	8	9 June 2007	1
9 June 2007	5	"The Girls"	Calvin Harris	3	16 June 2007	1
16 June 2007	2	"Heavyweight Champion of the World" ^{[E]}	Reverend and the Makers	8	16 June 2007	1
16 June 2007	10	"Do You Know? (The Ping Pong Song)"	Enrique Iglesias	3	23 June 2007	3
23 June 2007	2	"Icky Thump"	The White Stripes	2	23 June 2007	1
23 June 2007	4	"Like This"	Kelly Rowland featuring Eve	4	23 June 2007	1
23 June 2007	2	"Never Again"	Kelly Clarkson	9	23 June 2007	1
30 June 2007	3	"Any Dream Will Do" ^{[F]}	Lee Mead	2	30 June 2007	1
30 June 2007	1	"Smokers Outside the Hospital Doors"	Editors	7	30 June 2007	1
7 July 2007	9	"Foundations"	Kate Nash	2	7 July 2007	5
7 July 2007	1	"Had Enough"	The Enemy	4	7 July 2007	1
7 July 2007	7	"Worried About Ray"	The Hoosiers	5	14 July 2007	1
7 July 2007	1	"Torn on the Platform"	Jack Peñate	7	7 July 2007	1
14 July 2007	4	"When You're Gone"	Avril Lavigne	3	14 July 2007	1
14 July 2007	12	"The Way I Are" (#7)	Timbaland featuring Keri Hilson & D.O.E.	1	4 August 2007	2
14 July 2007	2	"Soulmate"	Natasha Bedingfield	7	14 July 2007	1
14 July 2007	9	"Big Girls Don't Cry"	Fergie	2	21 July 2007	1
21 July 2007	2	"Fluorescent Adolescent"	Arctic Monkeys	5	21 July 2007	1
21 July 2007	2	"Teenagers"	My Chemical Romance	9	21 July 2007	1
28 July 2007	1	"Oh My God"	Mark Ronson featuring Lily Allen	8	28 July 2007	1
4 August 2007	2	"Song 4 Mutya (Out of Control)"	Groove Armada featuring Mutya Buena	8	4 August 2007	1
4 August 2007	1	"Big Girl (You Are Beautiful)"	Mika	9	4 August 2007	1
4 August 2007	1	"Autumnsong"	Manic Street Preachers	10	4 August 2007	1
11 August 2007	7	"With Every Heartbeat"	Robyn with Kleerup	1	18 August 2007	1
11 August 2007	3	"Dream Catch Me"	Newton Faulkner	7	11 August 2007	1
11 August 2007	11	"Hey There Delilah"	Plain White T's	2	15 September 2007	2
18 August 2007	9	"Stronger"	Kanye West	1	25 August 2007	2
25 August 2007	1	"I Found U"	Axwell featuring Max'C	6	25 August 2007	1
25 August 2007	3	"Clothes Off!!"	Gym Class Heroes featuring Patrick Stump	5	1 September 2007	1
25 August 2007	1	"Love Is Gone"	David Guetta & Chris Willis	9	25 August 2007	1
1 September 2007	8	"Beautiful Girls"	Sean Kingston	1	8 September 2007	4
1 September 2007	1	"Suburban Knights"	Hard-Fi	7	1 September 2007	1
1 September 2007	8	"Ayo Technology"	50 Cent featuring Justin Timberlake & Timbaland	2	29 September 2007	1
8 September 2007	5	"Shut Up and Drive"	Rihanna	5	8 September 2007	1
8 September 2007	1	"The Creeps (Get on the Dancefloor)"	Freaks	9	8 September 2007	1
8 September 2007	5	"1973"	James Blunt	4	15 September 2007	2
15 September 2007	2	"Sexy! No No No..."	Girls Aloud	5	15 September 2007	1
15 September 2007	6	"She's So Lovely"	Scouting for Girls	7	29 September 2007	1
29 September 2007	1	"Delivery"	Babyshambles	6	29 September 2007	1
29 September 2007	1	"The Pretender"	Foo Fighters	8	29 September 2007	1
6 October 2007	9	"About You Now" (#6)	Sugababes	1	6 October 2007	4
6 October 2007	4	"No U Hang Up"/"If That's OK with You"	Shayne Ward	2	6 October 2007	1
6 October 2007	4	"Let Me Think About It"	Ida Corr vs. Fedde Le Grand	2	13 October 2007	2
13 October 2007	13	"Valerie" (#9)	Mark Ronson featuring Amy Winehouse	2	27 October 2007	1
13 October 2007	2	"1234"	Feist	8	13 October 2007	1
20 October 2007	4	"Goodbye Mr A"	The Hoosiers	4	27 October 2007	1
27 October 2007	4	"Gimme More"	Britney Spears	3	27 October 2007	1
27 October 2007	13	"Apologize"	Timbaland featuring OneRepublic	3	17 November 2007	2
27 October 2007	1	"Happy Ending"	Mika	7	27 October 2007	1
27 October 2007	4	"Uninvited"	Freemasons featuring Bailey Tzuke	8	27 October 2007	3
3 November 2007	11	"Bleeding Love" (#1)	Leona Lewis	1	3 November 2007	7
3 November 2007	12	"Rule the World" (#5)	Take That	2	3 November 2007	4
3 November 2007	2	"The Heart Never Lies"	McFly	3	3 November 2007	1
3 November 2007	1	"Lord Don't Slow Me Down"	Oasis	10	3 November 2007	1
10 November 2007	4	"Home"	Westlife	3	10 November 2007	1
17 November 2007	1	"Hot Stuff (Let's Dance)"	Craig David	7	17 November 2007	1
17 November 2007	6	"No One"	Alicia Keys	6	24 November 2007	2
24 November 2007	3	"2 Hearts"	Kylie Minogue	4	24 November 2007	1
24 November 2007	1	"Flux"	Bloc Party	8	24 November 2007	1
24 November 2007	1	"Loch Lomond (Hampden Remix)" ^{[G]}	Runrig featuring Tartan Army	9	24 November 2007	1
1 December 2007	6	"Heartbroken"	T2 featuring Jodie Aysha	2	1 December 2007	3
1 December 2007	7	"Call the Shots"	Girls Aloud	3	8 December 2007	2
1 December 2007	3	"Breathless"	Shayne Ward	6	1 December 2007	1
15 December 2007	3	"All I Want for Christmas Is You" ^{[H]}	Mariah Carey	4	22 December 2007	1
15 December 2007	8	"Crank That (Soulja Boy)" ♦	Soulja Boy Tell'em	2	12 January 2008	1
22 December 2007	2	"What a Wonderful World"	Eva Cassidy & Katie Melua	1	22 December 2007	1
22 December 2007	3	"Fairytale of New York" ^{[I]}	The Pogues featuring Kirsty McColl	4	29 December 2007	1
22 December 2007	1	"What Hurts the Most"	Cascada	10	22 December 2007	1
29 December 2007	4	"When You Believe" (#4)	Leon Jackson	1	29 December 2007	3

== Entries by artist ==
The following table shows artists who achieved two or more top 10 entries in 2007, including singles that reached their peak in 2006. The figures include both main artists and featured artists, while appearances on ensemble charity records are also counted for each artist. The total number of weeks an artist spent in the top ten in 2007 is also shown.

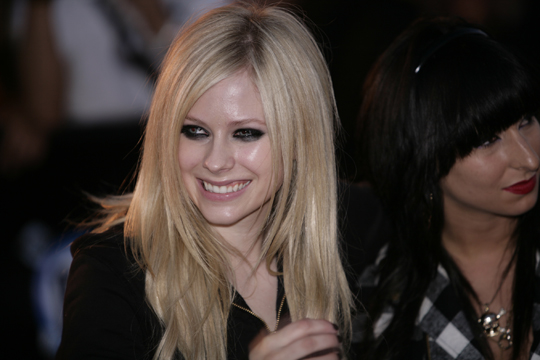
Canadian singer Avril Lavigne returned in 2007 with two top 10 singles from her album The Best Damn Thing: "Girlfriend" and "When You're Gone".

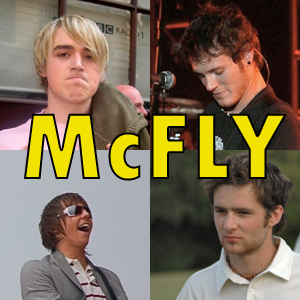
McFly achieved two top 10 entries in 2007 with the double A-side single "Baby's Coming Back" / "Transylvania" and "The Heart Never Lies".

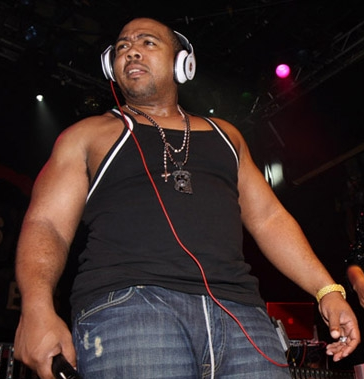
Producer Timbaland had four credited chart singles in 2007 including "The Way I Are" and "Apologize" with OneRepublic.

Entries	Artist	Weeks	Singles
4	Akon ^{[J]}^{[K]}	23	"Don't Matter", "I Wanna Love You", "Smack That", "The Sweet Escape"
4	Mika	15	"Big Girl (You Are Beautiful)", "Grace Kelly", "Happy Ending", "Love Today"
4	Timbaland ^{[L]}	39	"Apologize", "Ayo Technology", "Give It to Me", "The Way I Are"
3	Cascada ^{[K]}	5	"Miracle", "Truly Madly Deeply", "What Hurts the Most"
3	Girls Aloud	9	"Call the Shots", "Sexy! No No No...", "Walk This Way"
3	Justin Timberlake ^{[L]}^{[M]}	21	"Ayo Technology", "Give It to Me", "What Goes Around... Comes Around"
3	Mark Ronson	19	"Oh My God", "Stop Me", "Valerie"
3	Take That ^{[K]}	19	"Patience", "Rule the World", "Shine"
2	Arctic Monkeys	4	"Brianstorm", "Fluorescent Adolescent"
2	Avril Lavigne	12	"Girlfriend", "When You're Gone"
2	Bloc Party	2	"Flux", "The Prayer"
2	Booty Luv ^{[K]}	6	"Boogie 2nite", "Shine"
2	Calvin Harris	6	"Acceptable in the 80s", "The Girls"
2	The Enemy	2	"Away from Here", "Had Enough"
2	Fedde Le Grand	6	"The Creeps", "Let Me Think About It"
2	Fergie	13	"Big Girls Don't Cry", "Glamorous"
2	Groove Armada	3	"Get Down", "Song 4 Mutya (Out of Control)"
2	Gym Class Heroes	12	"Clothes Off!!", "Cupid's Chokehold"
2	The Hoosiers	11	"Goodbye Mr A", "Worried About Ray"
2	Leona Lewis ^{[K]}	13	"A Moment Like This", "Bleeding Love"
2	Manic Street Preachers	3	"Autumnsong", "Your Love Alone Is Not Enough"
2	McFly	3	"Baby's Coming Back"/"Transylvania", "The Heart Never Lies"
2	Mutya Buena ^{[N]}	6	"Real Girl", "Song 4 Mutya (Out of Control)"
2	Natasha Bedingfield	4	"I Wanna Have Your Babies", "Soulmate"
2	Nelly Furtado ^{[M]}	11	"Give It to Me", "Say It Right"
2	Rihanna	18	"Shut Up and Drive", "Umbrella"
2	Snow Patrol ^{[K]}	3	"Chasing Cars", "Signal Fire"
2	Sugababes	11	"About You Now", "Walk This Way"

== Notes ==
- ^{a} "Crank That" reached its peak of number two on 12 January 2008 (week ending).
- ^{b} "Chasing Cars" re-entered the top 10 at number 9 on 13 January 2007 (week ending), under new chart rules where a single only needed to be available to download to be eligible for the chart.
- ^{c} Released as the official single for Comic Relief.
- ^{d} "Flying the Flag (For You)" was the United Kingdom's entry in the Eurovision Song Contest 2007.
- ^{e} "Heavyweight Champion of the World" re-entered the top 10 at number 10 on 7 July 2007 (week ending).
- ^{f} Released as the official single for Children in Need.
- ^{g} Released as an unofficial single for Children in Need. The song charted higher than one of the official Children in Need singles, "Headlines (Friendship Never Ends)" by Spice Girls, which peaked at number 11.
- ^{h} "All I Want for Christmas" first charted at its original peak of number 2 for three weeks in 1994. It re-entered the top 10 at number 8 on 15 December 2007 (week ending).
- ^{i} "Fairytale of New York" first charted at its original peak of number 2 for two weeks in 1987. It re-entered the Top 10 on 22 December 2007 (week ending) at number 8.
- ^{j} Figure includes appearance on Gwen Stefani's "The Sweet Escape".
- ^{k} Figure includes song that peaked in 2006.
- ^{l} Figure includes appearance on 50 Cent's "Ayo Technology".
- ^{m} Figure includes appearance on Timbaland's "Give It to Me".
- ^{n} Figure includes appearance on Groove Armada's "Song 4 Mutya (Out of Control)".

== See also ==
- 2007 in British music
- List of number-one singles from the 2000s (UK)
