= Real Girl =

Real Girl may refer to:

- Real Girl (album), a 2007 album by Mutya Buena
  - "Real Girl" (song)
- Real Girl (manga), a Japanese manga series written and illustrated by Nanami Mao
- Real Girl (film), a 2018 Japanese film adaptation of the manga series
