= E-boy (disambiguation) =

E-Boy refers to an internet subculture of primarily Gen Z teenagers.

E-Boy may also refer to:

- EBoy, German pixel art group
- E-Boy, Pilipino television program
- The Eboys, a discontinued YouTube group consisting of WillNE, Memeulous, James Marriott and ImAllexx
