= Strung Out (disambiguation) =

Strung Out is a band.

Strung Out may also refer to:

- "Strung Out", a song by Betty Blowtorch from Are You Man Enough?
- "Strung Out", a song by Mutya Buena from Real Girl
- "Strung Out", a song by Steve Perry, from Street Talk
- "Strung Out", a song by Van Halen, from Balance
- "Strung Out", a song by Andy McCoy
