= Get Down (Groove Armada song) =

2007 single by Groove Armada

Single by Groove Armada featuring Stush and Red Rat

from the album Soundboy Rock
- Released: 23 April 2007
- Length: 3:53
- Label: Columbia
- Songwriters: Andy Cato; Tom Findlay; Julie McAlpine
- Producer: Groove Armada

Groove Armada singles chronology
"I See You Baby" (2004)	"Get Down" (2007)	"Song 4 Mutya (Out of Control)" (2007)

"Get Down" is a song by English electronic music group Groove Armada, featuring vocals from Stush and backing vocals from Red Rat. It was released officially on 23 April 2007, after it had appeared as an extended play (EP) on the iTunes Store. The CD and downloads contain remixes of the song. "Get Down" peaked at number nine on the UK Singles Chart, becoming Groove Armada's first top-10 single, and reached number one on the UK Dance Singles Chart. The pixel art album cover was designed by eBoy.

== Track listings ==
- CD single and digital download
1. "Get Down" – 3:53
2. "Get Down" (Calvin Harris remix) – 5:30
3. "Get Down" (Henrik B. remix) – 7:19
4. "Get Down" (Stretch and Form remix) – 6:36
- 12-inch single
1. "Get Down" – 3:53
2. "Get down" (dub mix) – 7:14

== Charts ==
Chart (2007)	Peak position
Australia (ARIA)	33
Ireland (IRMA)	48
Italy (FIMI)	22
Netherlands (Single Top 100)	89
Scottish Singles Sales (Official Charts)	16
UK Singles (Official Charts)	9
UK Dance (Official Charts)	1
