= Freaks (band) =

Electronic band from London, England

Freaks, earlier known as Robotic Movement, Future Movement and the Unknown are an electronic band from London, England. The band members are Justin Harris and Luke Solomon. They also run the record label "Music for Freaks". Both members have worked as DJs under their own names and collectively as Freaks.

== Discography ==
=== Albums ===
- 2000 "The Beat Diaries"
- 2001 "Meanwhile, Back at the Disco..."
- 2003 "The Man Who Lived Underground"
- 2004 "Notes from the underground"
- 2007 "The Creeps (Get on the Dancefloor)"

=== Singles ===
- 1999 "Sweet Dreams (instrumental)"
- 2007 "The Creeps (Get on the Dancefloor)" UK #9

=== Selected remixes ===
- 1996 Alison Limerick – "Make It on My Own"
- 1997 Hardfloor – "Mahogany Roots"
- 1999 Akasha – "Spanish Fly"
- 2002 Freeform Five – "Perspex Sex"
- 2002 Golden Boy with Miss Kittin – "Rippin Kittin"
- 2002 Télépopmusik – "Love Can Damage Your Health"
- 2002 Tiefschwarz – "Acid Soul"
- 2003 The Human League – "The Sound of the Crowd"
- 2003 Isolée – "Brazil.com"
- 2003 Julius Papp – "Libido"
- 2003 Martina Topley-Bird – "I Still Feel"
- 2004 Soul Mekanik – "Get Your Head Stuck on Your Neck"
- 2005 Cagedbaby – "Disco Biscuit"
- 2005 Garbage – "Sex Is Not the Enemy"
- 2006 A Guy Called Gerald – "Blow Your House Down"
- 2006 Chicken Lips – "White Dwarf"
- 2006 Herbert – "Harmonise"
- 2006 Revl9n – "Someone Like You"
