= B Boy Baby =

Single by Mutya Buena

from the album Real Girl
- Released: 23 December 2007
- Length: 3:54
- Label: 4th & B'way
- Songwriters: Phil Spector; Ellie Greenwich; Jeff Barry; Craig Klepto Tucker; Peter Celik; Angela Hunte
- Producer: Salaam Remi

Mutya Buena singles chronology
"Just a Little Bit" (2007)	"B Boy Baby" (2007)	"Black Valentine" (2020)

Amy Winehouse singles chronology
"Love Is a Losing Game" (2007)	"B Boy Baby" (2007)	"Body and Soul" (2011)

Alternative cover
- Promotional cover

"B Boy Baby" is a song written by British recording artist Mutya Buena with prominent background vocals by singer Amy Winehouse. The song samples "Be My Baby" by the Ronettes, written by Phil Spector, Ellie Greenwich and Jeff Barry, with new lyrics by Angela Hunte. It was produced by Salaam Remi for Buena's first solo album, Real Girl (2007) and released as the fourth and final single from the album on December 3, 2007.

== Background ==
Buena left the girl group Sugababes in December 2005, shortly after the birth of her daughter. She began working on her debut solo album after signing with Island Records. "B Boy Baby" resulted from sessions with British producer Salaam Remi, famous for his work with Amy Winehouse, Nas, and Fugees. It borrows lyrical and melodic passages from "Be My Baby" by the Ronettes, with the sampled chorus sung by Winehouse.

== Reception ==
Sharon Mawer of Allmusic wrote, "Buena raps the verses on "B Boy Baby" before launching into a chorus consisting of a slowed down version of the Ronettes/Phil Spector '60s masterpiece which even Amy Winehouse couldn't save from dreary boredom." Popjustice's Peter Robinson hoped that Winehouse's appearance on the "almost universally disapproved-of" song could help Buena's fledgling solo career "turn around." The single was ultimately a commercial failure, charting at number 73 on the UK Singles Chart. However, promotion for the single did see Real Girl return to the UK Albums Chart, re-entering the lower end of the charts at number 88 and rising to number 83. "B Boy Baby" has since been used in various adverts on UK television.

== Music video ==
The video premiered on 4Music on 4 December 2007.

== Track listing ==
- CD single
1. "B Boy Baby" (radio edit) – 3:02
2. "Fast Car" (BBC Radio 1 Live Lounge session) – 3:12
3. "B Boy Baby" (video) – 3:05
- Digital download EP
1. "B Boy Baby" (radio edit) – 3:02
2. "B Boy Baby" (Soul Seekerz remix) – 5:36
3. "B Boy Baby" (Music Kidz remix) – 6:37

== Charts ==
=== Weekly charts ===
Chart (2007–2008)	Peak position
Czech Republic Airplay (ČNS IFPI)	7
Hungary (Rádiós Top 40)	15
Romania (Romanian Top 100)	57
UK Singles (OCC)	73

=== Year-end charts ===
Chart (2008)	Position
Hungary (Rádiós Top 40)	39
