= Matt Ward (record producer) =

British music producer

Matt Ward is a UK based songwriter, record producer and remixer. He has worked under the following aliases: Full Phatt, 23 Deluxe, The MDs, Perfect Storm, FP, Global State, Boom Squad, Instant Flava, Secret Agents, Switch, Mush Shake Ya Cookie, and Patrolla.

== Career ==
Ward remixed for Jodeci, then scored songs with Erykah Badu, Mary J. Blige and The Black Eyed Peas. As Full Phatt, he worked with Ashanti, Lindsay Lohan, Shaggy, Usher, Nelly, JoJo, Outkast, Mario and Rihanna.

In 2003, as part of Full Phatt, Ward was one of the first official remixers (alongside Fatboy Slim and The Neptunes) of the Rolling Stones track "Sympathy for the Devil". Since the success of this remix, he has gone on to remix other classic songs such as Bill Withers' "Lovely Day", Smokey Robinson's "Tears of a Clown", Marvin Gaye's "I Heard It Through the Grapevine", Sergio Mendes' "Mas que Nada" and Bob Marley's "I Know a Place" and "Soul Shakedown Party".

Christina Milian's "Dip It Low", which Ward additionally produced, received a Grammy nomination in the category of Best Rap/Sung Collaboration in 2005. The song was certified gold by the Recording Industry Association of America in early January 2005 and reached number five on the U.S. Billboard Hot 100 chart as well as the top five in the United Kingdom and the top ten in the Denmark, the Netherlands, New Zealand, and Norway.

In 2007, Ward co-wrote and produced Mutya Buena's hit single "Real Girl" which was nominated for a Brit Award the same year. The record charted at Number 2 in the UK and was featured in the film Sex and the City as a theme for Jennifer Hudson. "Real Girl" was a Number 1 airplay record in the UK and Europe, achieving A list rotation on Radio 1, Radio 2 and Capital amongst other stations.

He also produced the original version of Ironik's "Tiny Dancer (Hold Me Closer)" featuring Elton John which went on to become a Top Three record in the UK.

In 2008, Ward released singles with EMI and Positiva under the name of Hotsnax and RCA under the name 23 Deluxe. He then signed a publishing deal with Sony/ATV.

In the same year, he worked with UK girl band, The Saturdays, co-writing a track on their Top Ten hit album Chasing Lights with the song "Vulnerable". The album has sold over 400,000 copies.

His work adding additional production on several tracks for Taylor Swift has brought him recognition on the country circuit and led to additional productions for Darius Rucker, The Band Perry and Sugarland. Following Ward's involvement, all the records were play-listed at Radio 2.

Ward has also done many radio edits for artists such as Jay-Z, Sting, Rihanna, Jennifer Lopez, Plan B, Gym Class Heroes, Ed Sheeran, Lionel Richie, fun., Wale, Afrojack, Tiësto, and Macklemore & Ryan Lewis.

In 2012, Ward mixed all the international duet vocals for Lionel Richie's Tuskegee album.

In March 2012, Ward's remix of "Hit the Lights" by Selena Gomez & the Scene received over 1.5 million YouTube hits in under a week.

In April 2013, Ward co-produced seven tracks on the self-titled album for the Japanese artist Miyavi. The album entered the Japanese rock charts at No. 1.

In November 2013, Ward additionally produced and mixed "Red Lights" by Tiësto which has sold over 600,000 copies to date and spent eleven weeks at the top of the Billboard dance charts.

In April 2014, Ward co-wrote and mixed "Can't Forget" on Tiesto's album A Town Called Paradise and ended up mixing eight tracks overall across the album. In its first week of release, the album entered the Top 10 in over forty countries.

Since March 2015, Ward has worked for Weav Music as their lead producer.
