= The Creeps (Get on the Dancefloor) =

2007 single by Freaks

"The Creeps (You're Giving Me)"

Single by Freaks
- Released: 2003
- Length: 3:41 (radio edit)
- Label: International DeeJay Gigolo
- Songwriters: Stella Attar; Luke Solomon; Justin Harris
- Producers: Luke Solomon; Justin Harris

"The Creeps (Get on the Dancefloor)"

Single by Freaks
- Released: 20 August 2007
- Length: 2:49 (radio edit)
- Label: Data
- Songwriters: Stella Attar; Luke Solomon; Justin Harris
- Producers: Luke Solomon; Justin Harris

"The Creeps" is a song by London-based electronic dance music band Freaks. The original version, titled "The Creeps (You're Giving Me)", appeared on Freaks' 2003 album, The Man Who Lived Underground. A set of remixes reached number 97 on the UK Singles Chart in December 2004. In 2006, it was remixed by Australian duo Vandalism; their remix became a club hit and "the biggest download in [dance music retailer] djdownload.com's history".

Following a bidding war, the song was signed to Ministry of Sound in 2007, and a new version titled "The Creeps (Get on the Dancefloor)" was produced, combining the Vandalism remix with a new vocal by Freaks member Stella Attar. This version went on to reach number nine on the UK Singles Chart in September 2007 and also charted internationally.

== Music video ==
The music video shows a male security guard who works in a mortuary. As he patrols the mortuary, three female corpses with vampyric elongated canines come to life and chase him through the facility. He is cornered at a locked door, but as they attack the scene changes to leave him on his own. He returns to the security centre to watch the CCTV replay where he sees the truth. The three girls were real, and are shown sensually attacking him with their canines.

== Track listings ==
- 2003 12-inch single
1. "The Creeps (You're Giving Me)" (Original)
2. "The Creeps (You're Giving Me)" (Steve Bug Remix)
- 2004 UK 12-inch remixes single
1. "The Creeps (You're Giving Me)" (Steve Bug Remix)
2. "The Creeps (You're Giving Me)" (Justin Robertson Remix)
- 2006 UK 12-inch "unreleased remixes" single
1. "The Creeps (You're Giving Me)" (Vandalism Remix)
2. "The Creeps (You're Giving Me)" (Lee Coombs Remix)
- 2007 UK 2-track CD single
1. "The Creeps (Get on the Dancefloor)" (Radio Edit)
2. "The Creeps (Get on the Dancefloor)" (Vandalism Remix)
- 2007 UK 6-track CD single
1. "The Creeps (Get on the Dancefloor)" (Radio Edit)
2. "The Creeps (Get on the Dancefloor)" (Vandalism Vocal Mix)
3. "The Creeps (Get on the Dancefloor)" (Thomas Gold Vocal Remix)
4. "The Creeps (Get on the Dancefloor)" (Thomas Gold Remix)
5. "The Creeps (Get on the Dancefloor)" (Micky Slim Remix)
6. "The Creeps (Get on the Dancefloor)" (Micky Slim Dub Mix)
- 2007 UK 12-inch single
1. "The Creeps (Get on the Dancefloor)" (Vandalism Vocal Mix)
2. "The Creeps (Get on the Dancefloor)" (Vandalism Remix)
3. "The Creeps (Get on the Dancefloor)" (Micky Slim Remix)
4. "The Creeps (Get on the Dancefloor)" (Thomas Gold Vocal Remix)

== Charts ==
=== Weekly charts ===
==== Original version ====
Chart (2003)	Peak position
UK Dance (Official Charts)	28

==== Original version (remixes) ====
Chart (2004)	Peak position
UK Singles (Official Charts)	97
UK Dance (Official Charts)	16
UK Indie (Official Charts)	26

==== Vandalism remix ====
Chart (2006)	Peak position
Australia Club Tracks (ARIA)	13

==== "The Creeps (Get on the Dancefloor)" ====
Chart (2007–2008)	Peak position
Australia (ARIA)	82
Australia Club Tracks (ARIA)	17
Australian Dance (ARIA)	13
Belgium (Ultratip Bubbling Under Flanders)	5
Hungary (Dance Top 40)	33
Ireland (IRMA)	23
Ireland Dance (IRMA)	2
Netherlands (Single Top 100)	36
Scottish Singles Sales (Official Charts)	12
UK Singles (Official Charts)	9
UK Dance (Official Charts)	1

=== Year-end charts ===
Chart (2007)	Position
Australian Dance (ARIA)	36
UK Singles (OCC)	152

== Release history ==
Region	Date	Format(s)	Label(s)	Ref.
Germany	2003	12-inch vinyl	International DeeJay Gigolo	
United Kingdom	22 November 2004	12-inch vinyl	Azuli	
United Kingdom (re-release)	13 November 2006	12-inch vinyl	Azuli	
United Kingdom (re-release)	20 August 2007	12-inch vinyl	Data	
United Kingdom (re-release)	27 August 2007	CD	Data	
Australia	1 October 2007	CD	Zip Music	
