= Just a Little Bit (Mutya Buena song) =

2007 single by Mutya Buena

Single by Mutya Buena

from the album Real Girl
- Released: 22 October 2007
- Recorded: 2007
- Genre: R&B; soul
- Length: 3:17
- Label: Island
- Songwriters: Eg White, Pam Sheyne
- Producer: Eg White

Mutya Buena singles chronology
"Song 4 Mutya (Out of Control)" (2007)	"Just a Little Bit" (2007)	"B Boy Baby" (2007)

"Just a Little Bit" is a song by English singer and former Sugababes member Mutya Buena. The song was written by Eg White and Pam Sheyne, and produced by White. It is the opening track from her debut studio album Real Girl, and was released in the United Kingdom on 22 October 2007 as the album's third single. "Just a Little Bit" is an R&B song with elements of soul. It received generally positive reviews from music critics, who commended Buena's vocal performance. The single peaked at number 65 on the UK Singles Chart. Buena performed it at The Borderline, London in April 2007.

== Development and release ==
"Just a Little Bit" was written and produced by the British musician Eg White, who wrote the song in collaboration with Pam Sheyne. The song was recorded by English singer Mutya Buena for her debut studio album Real Girl (2007), and serves as the album's opening track. "Just a Little Bit" was released in the United Kingdom on 22 October 2007 as the third single from Real Girl. Buena spoke about her nervousness about the song's release, saying: "I think about it all too much. Coming out of a successful group like the Sugababes, you want to do as well or better. You see so many artists who’ve come out of bands nose-dive and I think, 'I don’t want that to be me'." The CD single contains a radio edit of the song, three remixes, and its accompanying music video.

== Composition ==
"Just a Little Bit" is an R&B song with a Motown-inspired opening. Buena's vocals in the song are soulful and upbeat. It differs from her previous single "Song 4 Mutya (Out of Control)" which prominently featured synthesizers and rave elements. "Just a Little Bit" is reminiscent of the Sugababes' earlier material and has a "delicate and tender approach", according to Alex Fletcher from Digital Spy. Fletcher described the song's composition, writing: "'Just a Little Bit' takes a laid-back jazz beat, some funked-up guitar twangs, and the sort of easy listening rhythm that TLC and En Vogue used to toss about willy-nilly 15 years ago. While it's splendid to hear Buena deliver her delicious dulcet tones without Groove Armada sticking their oars in, there is more than a faint whiff of '90s nostalgia about the tune. So much so that you half expect Easther and Vernie from Eternal to join in with the harmonies at one point."

== Reception ==
=== Critical response ===
The song received generally positive reviews from music critics. Harry Guerin of RTÉ.ie wrote that "Just a Little Bit" was one of the tracks from Real Girl that shows Buena at her best, and elaborated that it "establishes her soul credentials". The New Zealand Herald critic Rebecca Barry Hill praised Buena's vocal performance on the song, which she characterised as "bluesy". Claire Allfree from Metro regarded "Just a Little Bit" as one of the album's better tracks and described it as an "itchy opener". Alex Fletcher from Digital Spy gave the song a three out of five star rating and wrote, "It lacks that killer pop hook to make it anything more than a decent album track". The Irish Times writer Kevin Courtney also rated the song three out of five stars and compared it to the success of her former bands' success: "It may not steal Subjugates' thunder, but it should grab a flash of the limelight". Mickey McMonagle from the Sunday Mail commended Buena's vocal delivery, but admitted that the song is "slightly lacklustre at times" despite being a decent track. The Independent's Andy Gill placed the song in his "Download this" category.

=== Chart performance ===
Upon release, the single failed to become a commercial success in the UK, where reached number 65 on the UK Singles Chart and charted for two weeks.

== Live performance ==
Buena performed "Just a Little Bit" in April 2007 at London's music venue The Borderline. The Observer critic Kitty Empire wrote that during the performance, the track "plays its old soul cards nicely", and that Buena's sound was evocative of English singer Gabrielle's.

== Charts ==
Chart (2007)	Peak position
UK Singles (Official Charts Company)	65
