= Real Girl (album) =

Studio album by Mutya Buena
- Released: 4 June 2007
- Recorded: 2006–2007
- Genre: Dance; soul; R&B
- Length: 51:17
- Label: Island
- Producer: Ruadhri Cushnan; Craigie Dodds; Jonny Dollar; Johnny Douglas; Sam Frank; Groove Armada; Dean Gillard; Felix Howard; James Jackman; Guz Lally; George Michael; RedEye; Salaam Remi; Jony Rockstar; Guy Sigsworth; Paul Simm; Matt Ward; Eg White; Wayne Wilkins

Singles from Real Girl
- 1. "This Is Not Real Love" Released: 20 November 2006; 2. "Real Girl" Released: 28 May 2007; 3. "Song 4 Mutya (Out of Control)" Released: 23 July 2007; 4. "Just a Little Bit" Released: 22 October 2007; 5. "B Boy Baby" Released: 23 December 2007

Real Girl is the debut solo studio album by British singer Mutya Buena. It was released on 4 June 2007 through Island Records. For the album, Buena collaborated with several producers, including Eg White, Johnny Douglas, Dean Gillard, Guy Sigsworth, Salaam Remi, and Wayne Wilkins, among others. The album is primarily an R&B record, which incorporates sounds of dance and soul. Lyrically, the album explores Buena's new-found freedom as a solo artist, and touches on subjects including love and vulnerability.

Two singles preceded the release of Real Girl; Buena's collaboration with George Michael, "This Is Not Real Love" (2006), and the album's official lead single "Real Girl" (2007). The former reached number 15 on the UK Singles Chart in November 2006, with the latter reaching number two, and the top ten in four other countries. The album's third single, the Groove Armada collaboration "Song 4 Mutya (Out of Control)", was released on 23 July 2007, and reached number eight on the UK Singles Chart. In late 2007, the album's fourth and fifth singles were released, titled "Just a Little Bit" and "B Boy Baby", respectively, both reaching lower-tier positions on the UK charts.

Real Girl received mixed reviews from music critics upon release, with praise given for Buena's vocal performance, but criticism aimed at a perceived lack of sonic originality. Commercially, the album peaked at number ten on the UK Albums Chart, and appeared in the top 75 on the charts in Ireland, Scotland, the Netherlands, and Switzerland. In December 2007, the album was certified Gold by the British Phonographic Industry (BPI), denoting sales of 100,000 copies in the country. To promote the album, Buena made multiple festival appearances, including at the iTunes Festival 2007, BBC Radio 1's Big Weekend, and the V Festival 2007, and performed on television shows including Popworld, The Friday Night Project, and Later... with Jools Holland.

== Singles ==
The first single from the album, "This Is Not Real Love", was released on 6 November 2006, as a duet with George Michael. The song was originally released as the second single from Michael's greatest hits album Twenty Five (2006), before being included as the eleventh track on Real Girl. "This Is Not Real Love" peaked at number 15 on the UK Singles Chart, and reached the top ten in Italy and Denmark.

"Real Girl", the album's official lead single, was digitally released in May 2007. The single was produced by Matt Ward and Dean Gillard. It peaked at number two on the UK Singles Chart for two weeks, becoming Buena's most successful single in the country. The song also reached the top ten in Finland, Slovakia, and the Netherlands.

The third single from the album, "Song 4 Mutya (Out of Control)", was released on 23 July 2007. The song is a collaboration with electronic music duo Groove Armada, also appearing on their album Soundboy Rock. It peaked at number eight on the UK Singles Chart, becoming Buena's second top-ten solo single, and spent seven weeks in the top 40. It also managed to chart in other countries including Ireland, the Netherlands, and Finland, where it peaked at number twelve on the Finnish Singles Chart.

"Just a Little Bit" was chosen to be the album's fourth single, and was released in late October 2007 in the United Kingdom. The single peaked at number sixty-five on the UK Singles Chart, and number 22 on the UK Physical Singles Chart. The fifth and final single from the album, "B Boy Baby" featuring Amy Winehouse, was released in late December, peaking at number seventy-three on the UK Singles Chart, and number 18 on the UK Physical Singles Chart.

Although not released as a single, the album track "Strung Out" gained significant attention for being co-written by Amelle Berrabah, who subsequently replaced Buena after she left the Sugababes in December 2005. The Sugababes confirmed during a radio interview in 2009 that they recorded an uptempo version but ultimately did not use it. The track was later given to Buena without her knowledge of Berrabah's writing contributions. Buena was reportedly unhappy upon finding this out, but record company executives pushed for the song's inclusion on the album. Berrabah is not credited as a writer in the liner notes.

== Critical reception ==
Professional ratings
Review scores
Source	Rating
AllMusic	3/5 stars
Digital Spy	3/5 stars
The Guardian	3/5 stars
NME	4/10 stars
Yahoo Music	7/10 stars

Real Girl earned generally mixed reviews from music critics. Caroline Sullivan from The Guardian found that "what emerges from her debut album is the fact that she'd quite like to be compared to Mary J. Blige, but will settle for Jamelia. Turning her back on Suga-pop, she has set herself up as a sophisticated urban girl, availing herself of the talents of Groove Armada, Amy Winehouse and George Michael to produce perfectly buff R&B. The Armada collaboration [...] stands out as a grinding electronic rave-up that's unmatched by anything else here." AllMusic editor Sharon Mawer described the album as "a mixture of danceable R&B songs" rated the album three out of five stars. Jaime Gill, writing for Yahoo Music, found that "a few more spiky moments like this "["B Boy Baby"] and "Song 4 Mutya", and a few less mid-tempo snoozes like "It's Not Easy", and this could have been a brilliant, bold debut by one of our most interesting pop stars. As it is, it will have to settle for an interesting mixed bag." Krissi Murison from NME felt that Real Girl was "a debut's worth of octave-warbling, R&B dross. And not even Winehouse herself (who rocks up on backing vocals on "B Boy Baby" – the not-quite-funny re-working of The Ronettes classic of nearly the same name) can stop it being any less of a letdown."

== Chart performance ==
Real Girl debuted and peaked at number ten on the UK Albums Chart, and spent 16 weeks overall on the chart. It reached Silver status after only four days of release and was certified Gold by British Phonographic Industry on 14 December 2007. In Ireland, the album charted at number fifty-one. It also managed to chart on the Netherlands and Switzerland albums charts, at number seventy-one and sixty-six, respectively.

== Track listing ==
Real Girl – Standard edition
No.	Title	Writer(s)	Producer(s)	Length
1.	"Just a Little Bit"	Eg White; Pam Sheyne	White	3:17
2.	"Real Girl"	Lenny Kravitz; Niara Scarlett; Matt Ward; Dean Gillard	Ward; Gillard; Andreas Olsson^{[a]}; Martin Terefe^{[a]}	3:29
3.	"Song 4 Mutya (Out of Control)" (featuring Groove Armada)	Mutya Buena; Andy Cato; Tim Hutton; Karen Poole; Tom Findlay	Groove Armada	3:30
4.	"Breakdown Motel"	Craigie Dodds; Jonny Dollar	Dodds; Dollar	4:20
5.	"Strung Out"	Buena; Pete Kirtley; Tim Hawes; Obi Mhondera	Jony Rockstar; Jeremy Wheatley^{[a]}; Richard Edgeler^{[a]}	4:20
6.	"It's Not Easy"	Buena; Felix Howard; Sam Frank; Paul Simm	Howard; Frank; Simm	4:32
7.	"Suffer for Love"	Buena; Ali Tennant; Guz Lally; Gus Redmond; Larry Brownlee; Lowrell Simon	Lally	3:27
8.	"Not Your Baby"	Buena; Ward; Gillard	Ward; Gillard	3:29
9.	"Wonderful"	Josh Thompson; Gandalf Roudette-Muschamp	Guy Sigsworth	3:07
10.	"B Boy Baby"	Phil Spector; Ellie Greenwich; Jeff Barry; Angela Hunte	Salaam Remi	3:53
11.	"This is Not (Real Love)" (with George Michael)	Michael; James Jackman; Ruadhri Cushnan	Michael; Jackman; Cushnan; Johnny Douglas^{[a]}	5:58
12.	"Paperbag" (United Kingdom and Australia bonus track)	Buena; Douglas; Nina Woodford	Douglas	4:18
13.	"My Song"	Thompson; Roudette-Muschamp; Wayne Wilkins	Wilkins; Redeye	3:36

Real Girl – Japan edition (bonus tracks)
No.	Title	Writer(s)	Producer(s)	Length
12.	"My Song"	Thompson; Roudette-Muschamp; Wilkins	Wilkins; Redeye	3:36
13.	"Real Girl" (Duncan Powell Remix)	Kravitz; Scarlett; Ward; Gillard	Ward; Gillard; Olsson^{[a]}; Terefe^{[a]}; Duncan Powell^{[b]}	5:58
14.	"Real Girl" (Full Phatt Remix)	Kravitz; Scarlett; Ward; Gillard	Ward^{[b]}; Gillard^{[b]}; Olsson^{[a]}; Terefe^{[a]}; Duncan Powell^{[b]}	3:26
15.	"Paperbag"	Buena; Douglas; Woodford	Douglas	4:18

Notes

- ^{^[a]} signifies an additional producer
- ^{^[b]} signifies a remix producer
- Amy Winehouse is credited as a backing vocalist for "B Boy Baby", not as a featured artist.

Sample credits

- "Real Girl" contains excerpts from "It Ain't Over 'til It's Over" (1991) as written and performed by Lenny Kravitz.
- "Song 4 Mutya (Out of Control)" contains elements of "Let's Be Adult" (1984) as written by Arto Lindsay and Peter Scherer and performed by Ambitious Lovers.
- "Suffer for Love" contains a sample of "Sorry I Can’t Help You" (1970) as written by Gus Redmond, Larry Brownlee, and Lowrell Simon and performed by The Lost Generation.
- "B Boy Baby" is a derivative of "Be My Baby" (1963) as written by Phil Spector, Ellie Greenwich, and Jeff Barry and performed by The Ronettes.

== Charts ==
=== Weekly charts ===
Weekly chart performance for Real Girl
Chart (2007)	Peak position
Dutch Albums (Album Top 100)	71
Irish Albums (IRMA)	51
Scottish Albums (OCC)	21
Swiss Albums (Schweizer Hitparade)	66
UK Albums (OCC)	10
UK R&B Albums (OCC)	4

=== Year-end charts ===
Year-end chart performance for Real Girl
Chart (2007)	Position
UK Albums (OCC)	186

== Certifications ==
Certifications for Real Girl
Region	Certification	Certified units/sales
United Kingdom (BPI)	Gold	100,000^{^}
^{^} Shipments figures based on certification alone.
