= This Is Not Real Love =

Single by George Michael and Mutya Buena

from the album Twenty Five and Real Girl
- Released: 6 November 2006
- Recorded: 2006
- Genre: Pop; R&B
- Length: 4:54
- Label: Sony BMG
- Songwriters: George Michael; James Jackman; Ruadhri Cushnan
- Producers: George Michael; James Jackman; Ruadhri Cushnan

George Michael singles chronology
"An Easier Affair" (2006)	"This Is Not Real Love" (2006)	"Heal the Pain" (2008)

Mutya Buena singles chronology
"This Is Not Real Love" (2006)	"Real Girl" (2007)

"This Is Not Real Love" is a song by English singer-songwriter George Michael, released as the second single from his second greatest hits album, Twenty Five. The single features Mutya Buena, the then ex-Sugababes member and was released on 6 November 2006. Due to the busy work schedules of both Michael and Buena, no video for the song was made. The song was also featured in a remixed form on Buena's solo debut album Real Girl. The song peaked in 2006 at number fifteen in the United Kingdom. On 25 March 2008, it was released in the United States and reached number eight on the Hot Dance Club Songs chart. It sold 10,000 units in Italy.

== Track listing ==
UK CD single number one

1. "This Is Not Real Love" (main mix) – 4:54
2. "Edith & the Kingpin" (live at Abbey Road Dec '04) – 3:40

UK CD single number two

1. "This Is Not Real Love" (main mix) – 4:54
2. "Everything She Wants" (remix) – 6:34
3. "I'm Your Man" (Extended Stimulation remix) – 6:52

Mutya Buena promotional single

1. "This Is Not Real Love" (Moto Blanco mix) – 8:58
2. "This Is Not Real Love" (Moto Blanco dub) – 8:14

== Charts ==
=== Weekly charts ===
Chart (2006)	Peak position
Austria (Ö3 Austria Top 40)	62
Belgium (Ultratop 50 Flanders)	41
Belgium (Ultratip Bubbling Under Wallonia)	4
Denmark (Tracklisten)	9
Europe (European Hot 100 Singles)	35
Greece (IFPI)	11
Hungary (Rádiós Top 40)	32
Ireland (IRMA)	27
Italy (FIMI)	4
Netherlands (Single Top 100)	32
Scotland Singles (OCC)	13
Switzerland (Schweizer Hitparade)	36
UK Singles (OCC)	15

Chart (2008)	Peak position
US Dance Club Songs (Billboard)	8
