= Soundboy Rock =

2007 studio album by Groove Armada

Studio album by Groove Armada
- Released: 4 May 2007
- Length: 60:34
- Label: Columbia
- Producer: Groove Armada

Groove Armada chronology
| The Best of Groove Armada (2004) | Soundboy Rock (2007) | Black Light (2010) |

Professional ratings
Review scores
| Source | Rating |
|---|---|
| AllMusic | 4/5 stars |
| Entertainment.ie | 3/5 stars |
| The Guardian | 3/5 stars |
| NME | 5/10 |
| Pitchfork | 5.8/10 |
| The Skinny | 4/5 stars |
| Slant Magazine | 3/5 stars |

Soundboy Rock is the fifth studio album by English electronic music duo Groove Armada, released on 4 May 2007 by Columbia Records.

== Content ==
The cover art was created by pixel artists eBoy.

The song "From the Rooftops" contains an uncredited sample of Jesus Loves You's 1989 single, "After the Love" (written by Boy George and Jon Moss).

== Release ==
The album was released on 4 May 2007 on CD, vinyl and also as a limited CD package with two bonus tracks, "Feel the Same" and "Hands Up". The first single from the album, "Get Down", was released prior to the album's release on 23 April 2007. The second single, "Song 4 Mutya (Out of Control)", followed in July. The two singles reached, respectively, numbers 8 and 9 on the UK Singles Chart, the duo's highest chart positions ever.

The third single, "Love Sweet Sound", was released in late 2007.

== Critical reception ==
Although the duo claimed the album was their best, the reviews were not always positive. In a three-star review for Slant Magazine, Dave Hughes criticised Groove Armada's lack of innovation, but praised the level of execution on the record. His observed that the album "manages to be familiar without being boring" concluding that "though it fails to inspire, it also, happily, fails to annoy." John Burghess of The Guardian was of a similar opinion calling the album "derivative, but sparky and well-executed." Writing for Pitchfork, Tom Ewing agreed with the duo's claim that Soundboy Rock was their best offering, but commented that their creative limitations were also obvious. He noted that every track missed a "killer idea that would make it vital." Two tracks did stand out for him, however: the first single, "Get Down," and the follow-up, "Song 4 Mutya," which he called inspired.

A very positive review came from Gemma Padley of BBC. She described the album as eclectic and unpredictable, with every track representing a different genre as breakbeat, electropop, trip hop, electro-reggae and grime. Despite this, she commented, the album maintains continuity.

== Track listing ==
1. "Hasta Luego Mr. Fab (Interlude)" (Andy Cato, Tom Findlay) – 1:01
2. "Get Down" (featuring Stush) (Andy Cato, Tom Findlay, Julie McAlpine) – 3:53
3. "The Things That We Could Share" (featuring Simon Lord) (Andy Cato, Tom Findlay, Simon Lord) – 3:59
4. "Save My Soul" (Andy Cato, Tom Findlay) – 4:24
5. "What's Your Version?" (featuring Jeb Loy Nichols) (Andy Cato, Tom Findlay, Tim Hutton) – 3:48
6. "Paris" (featuring Candi Staton) (Andy Cato, Tom Findlay, Candi Staton) – 5:38
7. "Love Sweet Sound" (featuring Candi Staton) (Andy Cato, Tom Findlay, Candi Staton) – 4:37
8. "The Girls Say" (featuring Rhymefest & Jack Splash) (Andy Cato, Tom Findlay, Tim Hutton, Jack Splash) – 4:03
9. "Lightsonic" (featuring M.A.D) (Andy Cato, Tom Findlay, Mike Daniels) – 6:55
10. "Soundboy Rock" (featuring M.A.D) (Andy Cato, Tom Findlay, Mike Daniels) – 3:55
11. "Drop That Thing" (featuring Jack Splash & Stush) (Andy Cato, Tom Findlay, Jack Splash, Julie McAlpine) – 3:06
12. "Song 4 Mutya (Out of Control)" (featuring Mutya Buena) (Andy Cato, Tom Findlay, Tim Hutton, Karen Poole) – 4:11
13. "From the Rooftops" (featuring Jack McManus) (Andy Cato, Tom Findlay, Jack McManus, Jim Irvin) – 4:50
14. "See What You Get" (featuring Alan Donohoe) (Andy Cato, Tom Findlay, Alan Donohoe) – 4:35
15. "What's Your Version?" (Reprise) (featuring Jeb Loy Nichols) (Andy Cato, Tom Findlay, Tim Hutton, Jeb Loy Nichols) – 2:09
16. "Feel the Same" (featuring Angie Stone) (limited edition bonus track) – 3:56
17. "Hands Up" (featuring Mistah Fab) (limited edition bonus track) – 4:07
18. "Breakers" (iTunes bonus track) – 3:56

== Charts ==
| Chart (2007) | Peak position |
|---|---|
| Australian Albums (ARIA) | 30 |
| Belgian Albums (Ultratop Flanders) | 63 |
| Dutch Albums (Album Top 100) | 77 |
| Irish Albums (IRMA) | 28 |
| Italian Albums (FIMI) | 45 |
| New Zealand Albums (RMNZ) | 19 |
| Scottish Albums (OCC) | 14 |
| Swiss Albums (Schweizer Hitparade) | 66 |
| UK Albums (OCC) | 10 |
| UK Album Downloads (OCC) | 6 |
| UK Dance Albums (OCC) | 1 |
| US Top Dance Albums (Billboard) | 10 |

== Certifications ==
| Region | Certification | Certified units/sales |
|---|---|---|
| United Kingdom (BPI) | Silver | 60,000^{^} |
^{^} Shipments figures based on certification alone.
