= Song 4 Mutya (Out of Control) =

2007 single by Groove Armada featuring Mutya Buena

Single by Groove Armada featuring Mutya Buena

from the album Soundboy Rock and Real Girl
- Released: 23 July 2007
- Genre: Electropop; new wave
- Length: 3:31
- Label: Columbia
- Songwriters: Andy Cato; Tim Hutton; Mutya Buena; Karen Poole; Tom Findlay
- Producer: Groove Armada

Groove Armada singles chronology
"Get Down" (2007)	"Song 4 Mutya (Out of Control)" (2007)	"Love Sweet Sound" (2008)

Mutya Buena singles chronology
"Real Girl" (2007)	"Song 4 Mutya (Out of Control)" (2007)	"Just a Little Bit" (2007)

"Song 4 Mutya (Out of Control)" is a song produced by British music duo Groove Armada, featuring vocals from recording artist Mutya Buena. Initially intended to feature British singer Estelle, the duo ultimately decided to collaborate with Buena on the song following her departure from girl group Sugababes in December 2005. Supported by a new wave-inspired beat, dance synthesizers and a bass line, it is an uptempo electronic and electropop song. The lyrics were interpreted by the media as an "insult" to Buena's Sugababes replacement Amelle Berrabah, although Buena herself has denied such allegations.

The song's production was met with critical acclaim, and various critics named it the song of the summer, while The Guardian and Xtra! highlighted it as one of the best songs of 2007. The song peaked at number eight on the UK Singles Chart and reached number one on the UK Dance Chart. It reached the top 40 in Australia, Finland, Ireland and the Netherlands. The single's music video was filmed in Finsbury Park, North London and features a festival theme.

Since its release, the track has gained prominence as a staple within the British LGBTQ community. Buena herself has stated she only performs the track in LGBTQ venues, events and spaces.

== Background and development ==
"Song 4 Mutya (Out of Control)" was written by Andy Cato, Tim Hutton, Karen Poole and Tom Findlay, and produced by the former two under their stage name Groove Armada. The song features vocals by English singer Mutya Buena, a former member of girl group Sugababes. The song was included on Groove Armada's album Soundboy Rock (2007), and Buena's debut release Real Girl. It was initially intended to feature British singer Estelle with the title "Song 4 Estelle", but according to Groove Armada, "she didn't nail it at all". The production duo revealed how Buena ended up on the song, saying:

We needed an iconic voice. It's the voice of a generation, that generation of female pop acts. The same way that Robbie Williams left Take That at the right time, she left Sugababes at the right time. The Sugababes are a bit random for me now. It doesn't work any more. She's one of those pop voices, when you mention her, people don't go "What are you working with her for?" They go "She's cool." Mainly 'cos she's so scary.

They also spoke about their hesitance regarding the collaboration with Buena:

I thought she would be a little monster. Mutya came into the studio and she was nice. You forget how young she is - she's 21 - so she has her little mobile phone and is on it to her little mates talking about getting the right colour of hair dye. And in the middle of this you're trying to write a track. She has her own opinion and she can really sing - she's a very good performer.

== Composition and lyrics ==
"Song 4 Mutya (Out of Control)" is an uptempo electronic and electropop song. It is accompanied by a New Wave-inspired beat and incorporates dance synthesizers and a bass line. The song was composed in the key of C major using common time, at a tempo of 120 beats per minute. The song is reminiscent of music from the 1980s. Popjustice described it as a "stompy electro version" of the Sugababes' 2006 single "Easy". "Song 4 Mutya (Out of Control)" contains a self-referential spoken introduction. The lyrical content is about seeing an old boyfriend with a new girlfriend; the protagonist stops at a red light in her car, where she witnesses her former boyfriend in the other lane with another woman. The song was interpreted by tabloid media as an "insult" to Buena's Sugababes replacement Amelle Berrabah, referenced through the line: "That's who has replaced me? / What a diss". However, this speculation was denied by Buena herself, who stated: "I've had to do a lot of explaining because of that line but it's got nothing to do with Amelle or the girls." The song's lyrical content also references American musician Prince; "I got Prince singin' 'Hot Thing' to me / I know every line". Some critics have stated that he was inspiration for the song's sound.

== Critical reception ==
"Song 4 Mutya (Out of Control)" received critical acclaim from critics. Popjustice declared it "completely amazing", while Claire Allfree of Metro praised the song as an "excellent disco slamming" track. Dan Gennoe of Yahoo! Music described the track as "pop perfection" and called it the greatest summer radio anthem since "You Get What You Give" by New Radicals. Harry Guerin of RTÉ.ie described the track as one from Real Girl that represented Buena at her best, and praised it as a "massive hit full of 1980s thrills". Kelefa Sanneh of The New York Times described it as a "glorious chronicle of romantic misery". Nick Levine of Digital Spy declared it the tune of the summer, while Xtra! included it on their list of best pop songs of 2007. Natalie Doyle of The Skinny wrote that Prince's influence on "Song 4 Mutya (Out of Control)" was evident in the beginning of the song. British newspaper The Guardian wrote that the track's combination of self-control, and Groove Armada's "dramatic, powerful and mood-elevating" production, propelled it as the finest pop song since Rihanna's "Umbrella". One of the newspaper's writers, Mike Sterry, called it the "greatest retro-future-pop record" of 2007, while Caroline Sullivan of the same publication highlighted it as "a grinding electronic rave-up", unmatched by other tracks on Real Girl.

== Chart performance ==
"Song 4 Mutya (Out of Control)" achieved moderate worldwide success. The song debuted at number 94 on the UK Singles Chart on 7 July 2007 and reached number eight in its fifth week on the chart. On the UK Dance Chart, the single peaked at number one. It became Groove Armada's best-performing single in the UK to date. At the end of the year, the song came in at number 112 on the UK's year-end chart. "Song 4 Mutya (Out of Control)" entered the Irish Singles Chart on 19 July 2007 at number 49 and reached number 26 the following week. It also peaked at number 12 on the Finnish Singles Chart, number 24 on the Australian Singles Chart, and number 37 on the Dutch Top 40 chart.

== Music video ==
The video for the song was filmed in Finsbury Park, north London and directed by Simon Henwood. With a festival theme, it features Buena singing seated in a car surrounded by an audience of fans jumping about, some dressed in animal suits in keeping with the Groove Armada "Get Down" video, and also features actress Tamzin Merchant. The video was released in July 2007, along with another version released on Buena's official website. The song's hook is featured in the video, and is inspired by the Ambitious Lovers song "Let's Be Adult" from their 1984 album Envy.

== Charts ==
=== Weekly charts ===
Weekly chart performance for "Song 4 Mutya (Out of Control)"
Chart (2007)	Peak position
Australia (ARIA)	24
Croatia (HRT)	4
Finland (Suomen virallinen lista)	12
Ireland (IRMA)	26
Italy (FIMI)	49
Netherlands (Dutch Top 40)	37
Netherlands (Single Top 100)	96
Scottish Singles Sales (Official Charts)	10
UK Singles (Official Charts)	8
UK Airplay (Music Week)	2
UK Dance (Official Charts)	1

=== Year-end charts ===
Year-end chart performance for "Song 4 Mutya (Out of Control)"
Chart (2007)	Position
UK Singles (OCC)	112
