= EBoy =

German pixel art studio founded in 1997

eBoy
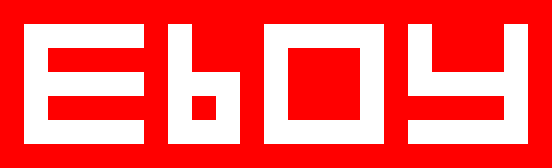

- Ecity Pixorama, 1998
- Formation: May 2, 1997; 29 years ago
- Founders: Kai Vermehr; Steffen Sauerteig; Svend Smital
- Type: Pixel art studio
- Headquarters: Berlin and Los Angeles
- Website: eboy.com

eBoy is a pixel art studio founded in 1997 by Kai Vermehr, Steffen Sauerteig, and Svend Smital. It is based in Berlin and Los Angeles. The studio's 8-bit-style work draws on popular culture and commercial imagery, rendered as three-dimensional isometric illustrations of cityscapes populated with robots, cars, and topless women.

eBoy has attracted a following among graphic designers. Design critic Steven Heller compared them to "what Roy Lichtenstein was to Ben-Day dots and comics." Their illustrations have been reproduced as posters, shirts, and souvenirs, and exhibited in galleries.

== Background ==
Sauerteig and Smital grew up within blocks of each other in East Berlin and met as teenagers. Neither had access to video games or computers; they learned about Western culture from John Peel's radio programs and punk shows staged in churches. Sauerteig took part in the Leipzig demonstrations that preceded the fall of the Berlin Wall, and later studied video arts at the Berlin Institute of Design. Smital studied typography and magazine design at the same school.

Vermehr was born in Germany and raised in Venezuela and Guatemala, where his father worked in pharmaceuticals. He grew up with Apple II computers but felt culturally isolated, and moved to Berlin after finishing school. He studied design in Cologne and later joined MetaDesign, where he met Sauerteig, then a student intern, in 1994. They began publishing pixel art on a website after Sauerteig graduated in 1996, and brought Smital in soon after to form eBoy. Earlier work had been distributed on floppy disks passed among friends.

The studio's work is inspired by "shopping, supermarkets, TV, toy commercials, LEGO, computer games, the news, magazines". Vermehr has also cited the picture books of Ali Mitgutsch as an influence.

== Process ==
Vermehr began experimenting with pixel art in the mid-1990s because digital images could be reproduced without any loss in quality. The studio works within an 8-bit style but rejects the retro label; Vermehr has called the association "a very common misconception," saying the choice was technical rather than nostalgic. Sauerteig has said the medium appeals because "you are forced to simplify and abstract things."

The studio maintains a shared database of more than 5,000 modular elements, accumulated over its history and recombined for each new project. A detailed cityscape takes roughly six to eight weeks of full-time work by all three members.

== Collaborations ==
eBoy's first major commission was a Pac-Man-style online game for MTV's Spring Break website in 1998. The studio has since worked with Adidas, Adobe, Bungalow Records, Coca-Cola, DKNY, FontShop, Gola, Honda, Kidrobot, Louis Vuitton, MTV, the New York Times, Nike, Paul Smith, and Xbox.

They designed the album covers for Groove Armada's Soundboy Rock (2007), Yuzu's YUZUTOWN (2020), and the Wombats' Fix Yourself, Not the World (2022).

== Pixoramas ==
The studio's largest works are Pixoramas, detailed isometric cityscapes that can take more than 1,000 hours to assemble. The studio has produced more than 20 since 1998, including:

- Baltimore
- Berlin
- London
- Los Angeles
- New York
- Paris
- Rio
- San Francisco
- Tokyo

A selection was published as a book in 2008.

== Exhibitions ==
Year	Title	Venue	Ref.
1999	Game Over	Museum für Gestaltung Zürich, Switzerland	
2000	Expo 2000	World's Fair, Hanover, Germany	
2002	postscript	Künstlerhaus, Vienna, Austria	
2002	the book and the exhibition	Magma, Clerkenwell, London	
2002	I love to meet you	new graphic design, Venice, Italy	
2003	Super, Welcome to Graphic Wonderland	Festival of Posters, Chaumont, France	
2003	GraficEurope	Pan-European Graphic Design Conference, Barcelona, Spain	
2003	8th International Design Conference	Typo 2003, Berlin, Germany	
2004	Paul Smith – eBoy	IDEE shop, Tokyo, Japan	
2004	Pixelesque	Maxalot, Barcelona, Spain	
2004	Superbroncobattle	Minuco Underground Gallery, Clerkenwell, London	
2004	Mural design to be built with LEGO bricks on student wall	MIT, Boston, USA	
2004		Tokyo Designers Block, Tokyo, Japan	
2005		CR9, Madrid, Spain	
2006	BUILDING SPACE	CTM, Berlin, Germany	
2006	Todaysart Festival	Nederlands Muziek Instituut, The Hague, Netherlands	
2006	Play	Typo 2006, Berlin, Germany	
2007	Hello Tokyo	artbits, Vienna, Austria	
2007	The Digital Aesthetic 2	Digital Aesthetic 2, Lancashire, UK	
2007	Happy Living	Museum of Tomorrow (MOT), Taipei, Taiwan	
2007		Todaysart Festival, The Hague, Netherlands	
2008	eBoy LA	Concrete Hermit Gallery, London	
2008		Pluto Festival, Brussels, Belgium	
2008	Vertrautes Terrain	ZKM, Karlsruhe, Germany	
2009	Pixorama	ROJO artspace, Barcelona, Spain	
2009		Centre Design Marseille, France	
2009	Exhibition and workshop	Nave, Rio de Janeiro, Brazil	
2009		Since, Paris, France	
2009	Pixorama	We Love Asbaek (ROJO artspace), Copenhagen, Denmark	
2009	Pixorama	Milk (ROJO artspace), Istanbul, Turkey	
2011		DC Gallery, Seattle, USA	
2011		madformacs, Barcelona, Spain	
2011		OFFF, Barcelona, Spain	
2012	De Sein: German Graphic Design from Postwar to Present	BODW, Hong Kong	
2013	Save Point	Floating World Comics, Portland, USA	
2013	Berlin Graphic Days	Kater Holzig, Berlin, Germany	
2013	Drones of New York	Museum of the Moving Image, Astoria, New York	
2014	Digital Revolution	Barbican Centre, London	
2017	64 Bits	Here East, London	
2017	Upstream Music Fest	Pioneer Square, Seattle, USA	

== Publications ==
- eBoy (2002). HELLO. London: Laurence King. ISBN 978-1-85669-303-5.
- eBoy (2008). Pixorama. Berlin: eBoy. ISBN 978-3-00-025838-1.
