= Mutya Buena =

British singer and songwriter (born 1985)

- Buena in 2025
- Born: Rosa Isabel Mutya Buena; 21 May 1985 (age 41); Kingsbury, London, England
- Occupations: Singer; songwriter
- Years active: 1998–present
- Children: 1
- Musical career
- Genres: R&B; pop; soul; dance
- Instrument: Vocals
- Labels: London; Island; Polydor
- Member of: Sugababes

Rosa Isabel Mutya Buena (/mʊˈtiːjə/ muu-TEE-yə; born 21 May 1985) is a British singer and songwriter who rose to fame as a member of girl group Sugababes. With Sugababes, Buena has achieved four UK number-one singles, an additional six top-ten hits, and three multi-platinum albums.

Buena departed Sugababes in December 2005, after which she embarked on a solo career. Her debut solo album, Real Girl, was released in June 2007 through Island Records. The album spawned three top-twenty entries on the UK singles chart; the title track which reached number two, "Song 4 Mutya (Out of Control)" (with Groove Armada) which reached number eight, and "This Is Not Real Love" (with George Michael) reaching number fifteen. Real Girl entered the top ten on the UK Albums Chart and was certified gold by the British Phonographic Industry (BPI). Following the underperformance of the album's final two singles, "Just a Little Bit" and "B Boy Baby", Buena parted ways with Island Records in 2008. She subsequently collaborated with various independent artists, including Ashley Walters, Don-E, Gak Jonze, and Coree Richards of Damage.

In 2012, Buena reunited with her former Sugababes bandmates Siobhán Donaghy and Keisha Buchanan. The original trio opted to release music under the name MKS (Mutya Keisha Siobhan). Their first single, "Flatline", was released in 2013 under Polydor Records, to moderate commercial success, after which the group entered a period of inactivity from the following year. In 2019, the group regained the rights to use the Sugababes name, and subsequently returned to releasing music and live performing. That year, The Guardian ranked Buena second on their list of the best girl band members of all time.

As a member of Sugababes, Buena has received several awards, including a Brit Award, a MOBO Award, and a BMI Award, while her solo career has earned her nominations for the former two. In addition to her music career, Buena has also appeared in multiple television shows, including Celebrity Big Brother (2009), Celebrity Coach Trip (2019), and Celebrity MasterChef (2024). In 2025, Buena released her autobiography, Real Girl, (Note: The book shares its title with her 2007 debut album and its title track.) which details her life and career.

== Early life ==
Rosa Isabel Mutya Buena was born on 21 May 1985 in Kingsbury to a Filipino father and an Irish mother. She has four older brothers, one younger brother, and three younger sisters. Buena has described her household growing up as being very musical, and she often sang with her father who played guitar. At age six, Buena entered the Little Miss Philippines pageant in London, where she first sang in front of an audience, and earned the runner-up prize. Following this, she began performing at various events in the Filipino community, including at weddings, funerals, and birthday parties. In 1994, Buena appeared on an episode of Barrymore, where she sang "The Greatest Love of All" by Whitney Houston.

On weekends, Buena attended a Filipino performing arts school called Euro-Fil. From the age of nine, she began touring Europe with a Filipino group called Pippa, where they would perform various traditional Filipino dances including tinikling and pandanggo. Buena has stated that she frequently sang songs by Whitney Houston and Barbra Streisand during her childhood, as well as Filipino songs including "Dahil sa Iyo" (1938), and "Matud Nila" (1941). She later attended Kingsbury High School with her fellow Sugababes bandmate Keisha Buchanan.

== Career ==
=== 1998–2005: Early career and Sugababes ===
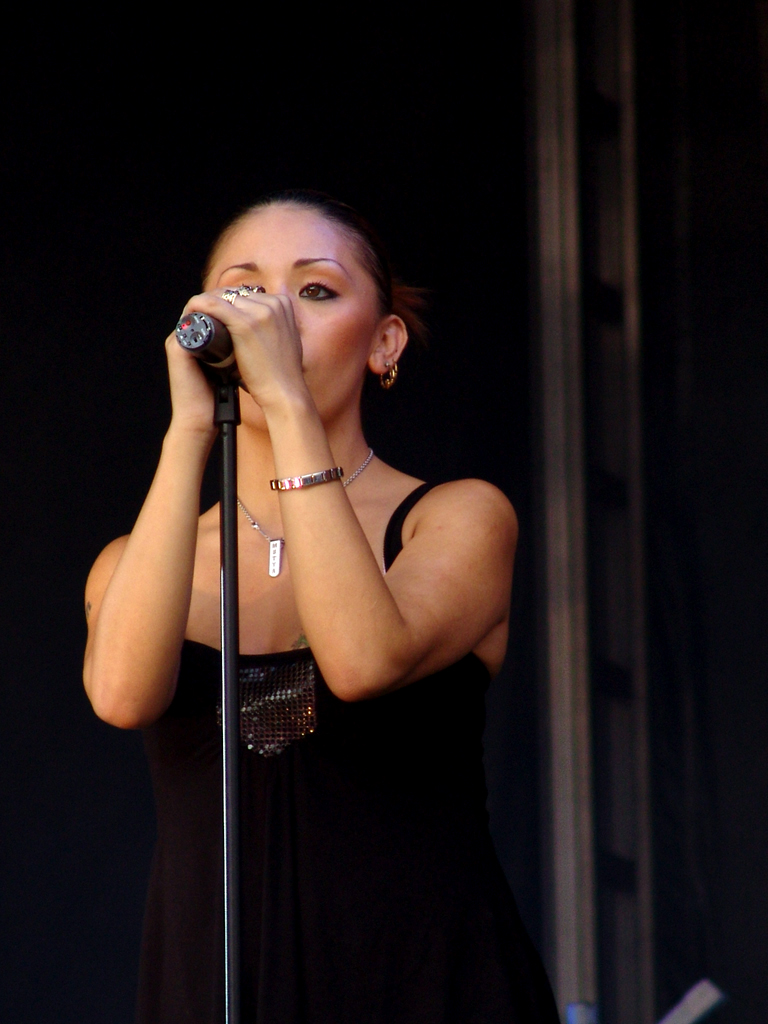
Buena performing with Sugababes at Bristol Ashton Court in August 2004

In 1998, at age 13, Buena, along with Keisha Buchanan and Siobhán Donaghy, began performing at showcases for music industry executives. That same year, the trio formed the girl group Sugababes, and signed to London Records. They were managed by Ron Tom, who had previously managed the British girl group All Saints. The group's Brit-nominated debut single, "Overload", was released on 11 September 2000, and reached the top ten on the UK singles chart, while their debut album, One Touch, was released in November 2000. The album spawned three further UK top-forty singles, "New Year", "Run for Cover", and "Soul Sound", however sales of the album did not meet the expectations of London Records and the group were subsequently dropped. Donaghy left the group in 2001, after which Heidi Range replaced her and the group signed to Island Records.

Buena achieved three multi-platinum albums with Sugababes under Island Records, including Angels with Dirty Faces (2002), Three (2003), and Taller in More Ways (2005), and four number one singles including "Freak Like Me", "Round Round", "Hole in the Head", and "Push the Button". She also achieved an additional six top-ten hits with the group. On Three, Buena sang a primarily solo track titled "Maya", which is dedicated to her late sister who passed away during infancy. At the Brit Awards 2003, she won the award for Best British Dance Act as part of the group.

Following the release of two singles from Taller in More Ways, "Push the Button" and "Ugly", Buena decided to leave Sugababes in December 2005. She later attributed her struggle with postnatal depression following the birth of her daughter, the group's increasingly hectic schedule, and her desire to spend more time with her daughter as reasons for her departure. In retrospective interviews, Buena revealed that if she had been allowed a one-month break from the group after the birth of her daughter, she may have stayed. The last remaining original member, Keisha Buchanan, said upon Buena's departure, "...we will all miss Mutya, but we also knew there was still a place for bringing in somebody new who could help us carry on taking the Sugababes brand of music forward".

=== 2006–2008: Real Girl ===
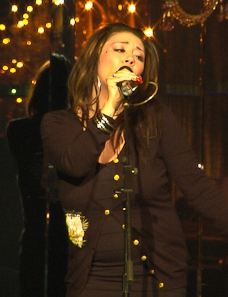
Buena performing in 2009

According to Buena, following her departure from Sugababes, she initially resisted embarking on a solo career as she was worried that fans would believe this was the only reason she left the group. However, she ultimately chose to pursue recording her own music, feeling that it would give her greater control over her sound and artistic direction, while allowing her to express aspects of her artistry that she felt unable to fully explore in Sugababes. For her solo career, she signed to Island Records.

Buena's first release was a duet with George Michael, a ballad titled "This Is Not Real Love", from Michael's greatest hits album Twenty Five (2006). Michael had previously wanted to work with Buena while she was still in Sugababes, however the collaboration did not come to fruition at the time partly due to scheduling conflicts. Upon Buena leaving Sugababes, Michael once again contacted her and asked if she would still like to work with him, after which she agreed and they began recording sessions for the song. The track was ultimately released in November 2006, and reached number fifteen in the United Kingdom, while peaking within the top ten in Italy and Denmark. Her debut solo single, "Real Girl", followed in May 2007. The track samples Lenny Kravitz's song "It Ain't Over 'Til It's Over", and was produced by London-based production company Full Phat, consisting of Matt Ward and Dean Gillard. It reached number two in the United Kingdom, and was shortlisted for Best British Single at the Brit Awards 2008. "Real Girl" was also featured on the Sex and the City, Vol 2: More Music Soundtrack (2008).

Both songs are included on Buena's debut album, Real Girl, which was released on 4 June 2007 through Island Records. The album peaked at number ten on the UK Albums Chart, and spent sixteen weeks in the top one hundred. In July 2007, her collaboration with Groove Armada, "Song 4 Mutya (Out of Control)", was released. The song is featured on their album Soundboy Rock (2007), and serves as the third single from Real Girl. It peaked at number eight on the UK singles chart, and spent seven weeks in the top forty. The fourth release from Real Girl, "Just a Little Bit", reached number sixty-five in the United Kingdom, while the fifth and final single "B Boy Baby", a re-working of the track "Be My Baby" by the Ronettes and featuring Amy Winehouse, reached number seventy-three. Buena was nominated for the "Best Newcomer" award at the 2007 MOBO Awards, which took place on 19 September 2007. In December 2007, Real Girl was certified gold by the British Phonographic Industry (BPI), denoting sales of 100,000 copies in the country. Despite this, in February 2008, Buena was dropped by Island Records due to the poor charting positions of her last two singles from Real Girl, "Just a Little Bit" and "B Boy Baby". That year, Buena appeared in an episode of Alan Carr's Celebrity Ding Dong (2008).

=== 2009–2011: The Sound of Camden, collaborations and other ventures ===
Buena performing at Birmingham Pride in May 2011

In January 2009, Buena participated in Celebrity Big Brother series six as a housemate. On 16 January 2009, day 15 of the series, she walked out of the Big Brother house after surviving eviction the same night, stating that she missed her daughter. That same year, Buena began collaborating with various independent artists, including Ashley Walters on the single "With You", "The Time Is Now" with Don-E, "Fallin" with Agent X, and "Give Back" with Tah Mac. Buena joined an array of artists to feature on the debut single of the London-based production duo NightShift, titled "Can You Persuade Me", a remix of "I Know You Want Me (Calle Ocho)" (2009) by Pitbull.

In November 2009, Buena registered a claim for ownership of the Sugababes name with the European Trademark Authority, following Keisha Buchanan's departure from the group in September 2009. Though Buchanan and Siobhán Donaghy's names appear on the trademark submission, it was confirmed that Buena was the sole applicant for submission and Donaghy and Buchanan were not involved. The fourth lineup of the group launched an opposition to the claim on the basis that goodwill and reputation in the mark and trading name "Sugababes" belongs to the partnership – not an individual. Buena ultimately won the rights to use the Sugababes name on stationery, paper gift wrap, and paper gift wrapping ribbon, although the fourth lineup retained the rights to the name in music, sound recording, and the entertainment industry.

In September 2010, Buena contributed six tracks to the compilation album The Sound of Camden. She recorded a series of covers of rock songs by bands such as U2, the Pixies, and Iron Maiden. The album was made available on iTunes and sold at Camden Market in London. It received positive reception, with Adam Lowe of Bent describing it as "a unique and tasty exploration into genre bending" which "shows Mutya's versatility", while Priya Elan of X Magazine called it a "lovely covers album" which Buena "lends her smoky vocals to". In October 2010, Buena expressed uncertainty about continuing in the music industry and said she was currently training to become a psychologist for children. Despite this, she teamed up with City Boy Soul, a band consisting of ex-Damage singer Coree Richards and British rapper Gak Jonze, and digitally released the charity single "Be OK" in December 2010. Buena also recorded lead vocals for "Give Me Love", by the British DJ and producer Paul Morrell. On 28 May 2011, Buena performed at Birmingham Pride.

=== 2011–2017: Mutya Keisha Siobhan ===
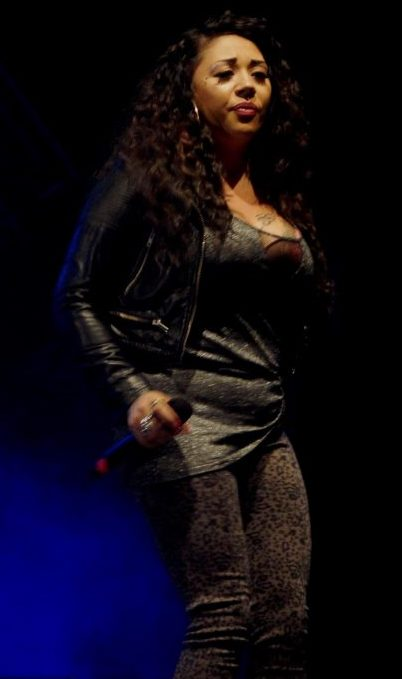
Buena performing as part of Mutya Keisha Siobhan at Manchester Pride in August 2013

In October 2011, several news outlets reported that the original lineup of the Sugababes would reform. In January 2012, Buena clarified on X (formerly Twitter) that she had no plans to record new material with the group, and was instead working on her solo material. Despite this, later that month, Scottish singer-songwriter Emeli Sandé confirmed to MTV UK that she had written new songs for Buena, Buchanan and Donaghy, stating: "I've written for the original lineup of the Sugababes [sic], which I'm very happy about because I just loved them when they first came out ... It sounds amazing".

In April 2012, it was reported that the lineup had signed a £1 million record deal with Polydor Records. In July 2012, it was officially confirmed that the group had reformed under the name Mutya Keisha Siobhan and were writing songs for a new album under Polydor. The group appeared on the cover of fashion magazine Ponystep in December 2012. On 31 December 2012, they performed an intimate gig at Ponystep's New Year's Eve party. The performance marked the first time Buena, Buchanan and Donaghy had performed together in over a decade.

On 26 March 2013, the group featured on a remix of Phoenix's single "Entertainment". Mutya Keisha Siobhan's first single, "Flatline", was released in June 2013. The track experienced moderate commercial success, peaking at number fifty on the UK singles chart. On 1 August 2013, the group performed their first official headlining concert at Scala in London. In November 2013, Buena's collaboration with British musician Shide Boss, the track "Bedroom", was released. In an interview with Digital Spy that same month, Buena said that she was open to reclaiming the Sugababes name following the split of the fourth lineup two years prior. Also in November, the group embarked on the Sacred Three Tour, performing a setlist of their Sugababes songs, as well as their newly recorded material including "Flatline", "I'm Alright", and "No Regrets". In February 2014, Buena attended the NME Awards 2014 as part of Mutya Keisha Siobhan, where the trio performed with English electronic music band Metronomy. Following a period of inactivity, plans emerged in the summer of 2016 for the band to release a new album in 2017, but this ultimately did not happen.

=== 2017–present: Solo projects and return to Sugababes ===
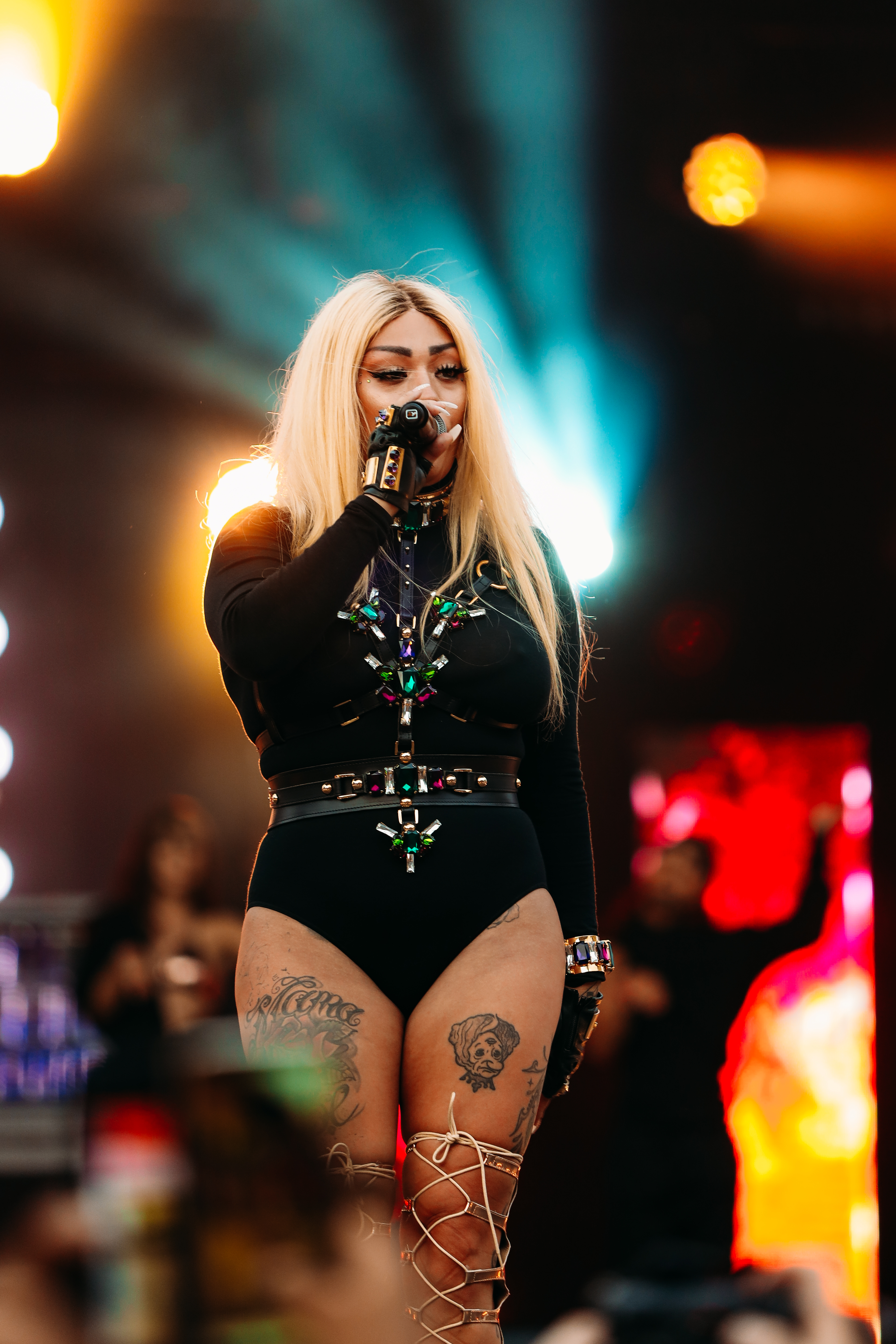
Buena performing at Amsterdam Pride in August 2019

In 2017, Buena started her own music agency, called Colour of Musiq. In April 2018, Buena was featured on the track "Game Over" with Rockwell, JSTN and Rico Flames, and she also appeared in its music video. Around this time, Buena embarked on various television projects. She appeared in an episode of MTV's Just Tattoo of Us, and appeared in series five of the British dating reality series Celebs Go Dating on E4. In 2019, she participated in the fourth series of the British reality game show Celebrity Coach Trip, paired with So Solid Crew member Lisa Maffia. The pair won the series.

In September 2019, Buena, along with Donaghy and Buchanan, regained the rights to use the Sugababes name, after which the group changed their social media handle from "MKS" to "Sugababes", and began teasing new music. The group's first release in over six years, a cover of the Sweet Female Attitude song "Flowers", was released in October 2019 as part of DJ Spoony's album Garage Classical (2019). They performed the song on The Graham Norton Show that same month. In February 2020, Buena released the single "Black Valentine", in collaboration with London-based pop duo Electric Pineapple. In April 2020, she expressed interest in releasing a solo R&B project. The following year, Buena collaborated with Ryuken on the garage-influenced track "The One".

In February 2022, Buena released a second single with Ryuken, titled "Feels Good", followed by the single "Takin' It Easy" with Morfius in May. That same year, Buena, as part of Sugababes, appeared at various festivals, embarked on a headline tour, and released The Lost Tapes, an album consisting of their 2013 single "Flatline" and previously leaked material. In April 2023, Buena released the single "All I Own", in collaboration with Dutch-Filipino DJ and producer Laidback Luke. On 15 September 2023, Buena, along with Buchanan and Donaghy, released their first original song under the Sugababes name since reclaiming it, titled "When the Rain Comes", to positive reception. That same month, the group performed a one-off show at the O2 Arena in London. In October 2023, the group performed "When the Rain Comes" on The Graham Norton Show.

In September 2024, Buena appeared as a contestant on the nineteenth series of Celebrity MasterChef. She was eliminated in the third round. In May 2025, Buena performed a setlist of songs at Mighty Hoopla, including "Song 4 Mutya (Out of Control)". Also in 2025, Buena contributed to Sugababes' self-released singles "Jungle", "Weeds", and "Shook", and embarked on the Sugababes '25 arena tour. In November 2025, she released her autobiography Real Girl, which details her life and career, and appeared as a guest judge on the seventh series of RuPaul's Drag Race UK.

== Personal life ==
Buena is half-Filipino, being born to an Irish mother and Filipino father, and has eight siblings. Her sister Maya passed away unexpectedly during infancy, with Buena dedicating a song to her on the Sugababes album Three. In March 2005, Buena gave birth to her daughter Tahlia with her then-partner Jay, who is six years her senior. In an interview with The Philippine Star in 2007, Buena explained that " [Tahlia] means morning dew. I found that name in the Internet and I think it's Hebrew". Following the birth of her daughter, Buena suffered with postnatal depression, which she has stated that she was unaware of for "two years", before seeking treatment.

In September 2014, Buena was declared to be bankrupt by a High Court judge. In 2020, she criticised the media for not covering the fact that she instantly paid off her £100,000 tax debts when she was made aware of the administrative error made by her accountants. Buena is a supporter of the LGBTQ+ community, which in a 2023 interview with Vogue Philippines, she described as "always keeping her booked", and "without getting all those bookings, I would've probably have given up".

== Legacy ==
In 2004, British music producer Brian Higgins of Xenomania, in an interview with The Guardian, described Buena as "undoubtedly the finest female singer this country has produced in years - for me the closest comparison is Dusty Springfield". According to Vogue Philippines, Buena has been "routinely lauded by the industry and the press as the best British singer of her generation", being "a husky-voiced crooner who brings intimate conviction to every line she sings". In 2015, Billboard included Buena's song "Real Girl" on their list of "Girl Group Solo Songs: The 10 Best (Non-Beyonce) Singles of the Modern Era", stating that "[Buena] was at her most confident [on "Real Girl"], with a cool sample flip of Lenny Kravitz's "It Ain't Over 'Til It's Over."

In 2019, The Guardian ranked Buena number two on their list of the best girl band members of all time, second to American singer Beyoncé, stating "As the [Sugababes] lineups changed and their sound grew more commercial, she remained the group's anchor, her lived-in voice adding grit to romcom-sized ballads "Too Lost in You" or "Stronger", and a genuine sadness to the anti-bullying anthem 'Ugly'". In a 2022 interview with Mixmag discussing "Song 4 Mutya (Out of Control)", Tom Findlay of Groove Armada described Buena as having "one of the best UK pop voices of all time" and "the ability to combine pop with a real edge". "Song 4 Mutya (Out of Control)" has been referred to as a "gay anthem" by Dazed magazine.

== Discography ==
- Real Girl (2007)

== Filmography ==
=== Television ===
Year	Title	Role	Notes	Ref
1994	Barrymore	Herself	1 episode	
2008	Alan Carr's Celebrity Ding Dong	Herself	1 episode	
2009	Shooting Stars	Herself	1 episode	
2009	Celebrity Big Brother	Herself	15 episodes (walked)	
2014	Fake Reaction	Herself	1 episode	
2018	Celebs Go Dating	Herself	1 episode	
2018	Just Tattoo of Us	Herself	1 episode	
2019	Celebrity Coach Trip	Herself	20 episodes (winner)	
2019	Hypothetical	Herself	1 episode	
2020	Don't Hate the Playaz	Herself	1 episode	
2022	Celebrity Juice	Herself	1 episode	
2024	Celebrity MasterChef	Herself	3 episodes (eliminated)	
2025	RuPaul's Drag Race UK	Herself / Guest Judge	1 episode	
2026	The Great Stand Up to Cancer Bake Off	Herself	1 episode (winner)	

== Awards and nominations ==
Award	Year	Category	Nominee(s)	Result	Ref.
BMI London Awards	2005	Pop Award	"Hole in the Head"	Won	
BT Digital Music Awards	2002	Artist of the Year	Sugababes	Nominated	
Boisdale Music Awards	2019	Best Soul Artist	Herself	Nominated	
Brit Awards	2001	British Single of the Year	"Overload"	Nominated	
Brit Awards	2003	British Group	Sugababes	Nominated	
Brit Awards	2003	British Dance Act	Sugababes	Won	
Brit Awards	2003	British Album of the Year	Angels with Dirty Faces	Nominated	
Brit Awards	2004	British Group	Sugababes	Nominated	
Brit Awards	2005	British Single of the Year	"In the Middle"	Nominated	
Brit Awards	2008	British Single of the Year	"Real Girl"	Shortlisted	
Capital FM Awards	2001	Best Kept Secret	Sugababes	Won	
Disney Channel Kids Awards	2004	Best Single	"Hole in the Head"	Won	
Disney Channel Kids Awards	2004	Best Female	Sugababes	Nominated	
Elle Style Awards	2002	Music Star Award	Sugababes	Won	
Glamour Awards	2025	Women of the Year	Sugababes	Won	
Ivor Novello Awards	2004	Most Performed Work	"Hole in the Head"	Nominated	
Ivor Novello Awards	2026	Best Song Musically and Lyrically	"Weeds"	Nominated	
MOBO Awards	2002	Best UK Act	Sugababes	Nominated	
MOBO Awards	2003	Best UK Act	Sugababes	Nominated	
MOBO Awards	2007	Best UK Newcomer	Herself	Nominated	
MOBO Awards	2024	Impact Award	Sugababes	Won	
MTV Europe Music Awards	2002	Best UK & Ireland Act	Sugababes	Nominated	
Music Week Awards	2022	Catalogue Marketing Campaign	Sugababes	Nominated	
Music Week Women in Music	2023	Inspirational Artist	Sugababes	Won	
NME Awards	2001	Best R&B/Soul Act	Sugababes	Nominated	
Pop Factory Awards	2002	Best Pop Act	Sugababes	Nominated	
Popjustice £20 Music Prize	2003	Best British Pop Single	"Round Round"	Nominated	
Popjustice £20 Music Prize	2004	Best British Pop Single	"Hole in the Head"	Nominated	
Popjustice £20 Music Prize	2008	Best British Pop Single	"Song 4 Mutya (Out of Control)"	Nominated	
Popjustice £20 Music Prize	2013	Best British Pop Single	"Flatline"	Nominated	
Q Awards	2002	Best Track	"Freak Like Me"	Won	
Rolling Stone UK Awards	2024	Best Live Act	Sugababes	Nominated	
Smash Hits Poll Winners Party	2000	Best New Band	Sugababes	Nominated	
Smash Hits Poll Winners Party	2002	Best Band on Planet Pop	Sugababes	Nominated	
Smash Hits Poll Winners Party	2002	Best UK Band	Sugababes	Nominated	
Smash Hits Poll Winners Party	2002	Best Single	"Round Round"	Nominated	
Smash Hits Poll Winners Party	2002	Best Album	Angels with Dirty Faces	Won	
Smash Hits Poll Winners Party	2005	Best Album	Taller in More Ways	Nominated	
Smash Hits Poll Winners Party	2005	Best Single	"Push the Button"	Nominated	
Smash Hits Poll Winners Party	2005	Best Video	"Push the Button"	Nominated	
Smash Hits Poll Winners Party	2005	Best UK Band	Sugababes	Nominated	
TMF Awards	2003	Best Pop International	Sugababes	Nominated	
TMF Awards	2003	Best Website	Sugababes	Nominated	
Top of the Pops Awards	2002	Best Pop Act	Sugababes	Nominated	
Top of the Pops Awards	2005	Best Single	"Push the Button"	Won	
