= Real Girl (song) =

2007 single by Mutya Buena

Single by Mutya Buena

from the album Real Girl
- B-side: "Naive"
- Released: 28 May 2007
- Genre: R&B
- Length: 3:29
- Label: Fourth and Broadway
- Songwriters: Lenny Kravitz; Niara Scarlett; Matt Ward; Dean Gillard
- Producers: Matt Ward; Dean Gillard

Mutya Buena singles chronology
"This Is Not Real Love" (2006)	"Real Girl" (2007)	"Song 4 Mutya (Out of Control)" (2007)

Alternative cover
- UK CD 2 cover

"Real Girl" is a song by English singer Mutya Buena, written by Lenny Kravitz, Niara Scarlett, Matt Ward and Dean Gillard. It includes a sample of Kravitz's "It Ain't Over 'Til It's Over". The song was produced by Matt Ward and Dean Gillard for Buena's debut album, Real Girl, and was released as the first single from the album on 28 May 2007 in the United Kingdom. In Australia, the song was released on 16 June 2007.

"Real Girl" debuted and peaked at number two on the UK singles chart on 3 June 2007, held off the top spot by Rihanna's "Umbrella", and it also reached the top 10 in Finland, the Netherlands, and Slovakia. It was shortlisted at the 2008 BRIT Awards for Best British Single. The track was up against Buena's former bandmembers Sugababes, as well as Leona Lewis, Kate Nash and Take That.

== Music video ==
The music video premiered on 3 April 2007, and on Australian music channels on 18 May.

It shows Buena laying on a bed, writing and looking at pictures in what appears to be a scrapbook. One of the pictures comes to life and a close-up of the scene is shown. It includes Buena taking pictures and partying with a couple of friends. Her sister Dalisay makes a cameo appearance in the clip. As the second part of the chorus kicks in, she is shown hanging out in shops and taking pictures. When the second verse starts, she is in a room seemingly filled with candles. She is then seen singing and wearing a white dress in a totally new background with pictures on the wall. As Buena sings the bridge, many pictures are shown, most notably of Buena wearing a necklace that says "real". She is wearing a short black dress, as seen on the single cover, and singing when the second chorus starts. People are shown dancing as she sings the bridge. As the video closes, various photos of Buena and her friends are seen.

== Track listing ==
UK CD single 1

1. "Real Girl" (Original Mix) – 3:29
2. "Naive" (Recorded at 'The Engine Room') – 3:07

UK CD single 2

1. "Real Girl" (Original Mix) – 3:29
2. "Real Girl" (Moto Blanco Remix) – 7:24
3. "Real Girl" (Primary 1's Real Girls In Another World Mix) – 7:23
4. "Real Girl" (Duncan Powell Mix) – 5:58
5. "Real Girl" (Video) – 3:29

== Charts ==
=== Weekly charts ===
Chart (2007)	Peak position
Australia (ARIA)	59
Austria (Ö3 Austria Top 40)	46
Belgium (Ultratip Bubbling Under Flanders)	3
Belgium (Ultratip Bubbling Under Wallonia)	12
Croatia International Airplay (HRT)	2
Czech Republic Airplay (ČNS IFPI)	53
Denmark (Tracklisten)	28
Europe (Eurochart Hot 100)	7
Finland (Suomen virallinen lista)	6
Germany (GfK)	40
Hungary (Rádiós Top 40)	12
Hungary (Dance Top 40)	38
Ireland (IRMA)	25
Italy (FIMI)	18
Netherlands (Dutch Top 40)	6
Netherlands (Single Top 100)	9
Scottish Singles Sales (Official Charts)	3
Slovakia Airplay (ČNS IFPI)	2
Switzerland (Schweizer Hitparade)	53
UK Singles (Official Charts)	2
UK Hip Hop/R&B (Official Charts)	2

=== Year-end charts ===
Chart (2007)	Position
Hungary (Rádiós Top 40)	78
Netherlands (Dutch Top 40)	53
Netherlands (Single Top 100)	97
UK Singles (OCC)	71

== Certifications ==
Region	Certification	Certified units/sales
United Kingdom (BPI)	Silver	200,000^{‡}
^{‡} Sales+streaming figures based on certification alone.
