= Red Dress (Sugababes song) =

2006 single by Sugababes

Single by Sugababes

from the album Taller in More Ways
- B-side: "I Bet You Look Good on the Dancefloor"
- Released: 6 March 2006
- Studio: Eden (London, England)
- Genre: Pop
- Length: 3:38
- Label: Island
- Songwriters: Keisha Buchanan; Mutya Buena; Heidi Range; Brian Higgins; Miranda Cooper; Tim Powell; Nick Coler; Shawn Lee; Lisa Cowling; Bob Bradley
- Producers: Brian Higgins; Xenomania

Sugababes singles chronology
"Ugly" (2005)	"Red Dress" (2006)	"Follow Me Home" (2006)

Music video
- "Red Dress" on YouTube

"Red Dress" is a song by British girl group Sugababes from their fourth studio album, Taller in More Ways (2005). The group's members wrote the song in collaboration with its producers, the British songwriting and production team Xenomania, based on the perception that women must expose their body to be noticed. "Red Dress" was released in the United Kingdom on 6 March 2006 as the album's third single, and is the first to feature vocals by Amelle Berrabah, following the departure of Mutya Buena in December 2005. The Sugababes performed a cover of the Arctic Monkeys' song "I Bet You Look Good on the Dancefloor" as the single's B-side.

The song is an uptempo pop record that contains a sample from "Landslide", a Northern soul recording by Tony Clarke. It received positive reviews from critics, who commended its composition and Xenomania's contribution in particular. "Red Dress" peaked at number four on the UK Singles Chart, number seven on the Netherlands' Dutch Top 40 chart, and inside the top twenty on the singles charts of Ireland, New Zealand and Norway. The song's music video was directed by Tim Royes in January 2006 and features the group's members in red dresses. The Sugababes performed the single as part of the set lists for their Taller in More Ways, Overloaded: The Singles Collection and Change tours, and at the Liverpool Summer Pops and Oxegen Festival music festivals.

For the single release, the song was re-recorded to feature vocals from Berrabah. The single version also features some re-recorded vocals from Buchanan and Range.

== Background and composition ==
Sugababes – "Red Dress"
A sample of the chorus of "Red Dress", which consists of keyboards, bass and guitars and features a girl power theme.

"Red Dress" was written by the Sugababes—Keisha Buchanan, Mutya Buena and Heidi Range—in collaboration with Brian Higgins, Miranda Cooper, Tim Powell, Nick Coler, Shawn Lee, Lisa Cowling, and Bob Bradley, for the group's fourth studio album Taller in More Ways (2005). According to Range, the song was inspired by the perception that women must expose their body to be noticed. It was produced by Higgins and Xenomania, who also produced the album track "Ace Reject". "Red Dress" was mixed by Jeremy Wheatley and Powell with assistance from Richard Edgeler, and programmed by Powell and Higgins. The accompanying keyboards for the track were provided by Powell, Higgins, Tim Larcombe and Jon Shave. The bass was provided by Bradley, while the guitars were provided by Coler and Lee. "Red Dress" was recorded by Dario Dendi at Eden Studios, London, with assistance from Chris Poulter and Zoe Smith.

"Red Dress" is an uptempo pop song with elements of funk. Its instrumentation consists of keyboards, bass and guitars. The song's main riff is sampled from "Landslide", a Northern soul recording by Tony Clarke. "Red Dress" features two choruses, as well as verses that are reminiscent of "Rapture" by American pop band Blondie. Talia Kraines of BBC noted that the song has a "foot-tapping" vibe to it. "Red Dress" features a girl power theme, and is lyrically encourage women to use their sexuality to gain power over men. The Sugababes repeatedly sing the line "Cause I'm cooler than the red dress" during the beginning of the song and in the first chorus. Ross Hoffman of AllMusic noted that "Red Dress" is evocative of Xenomania's "frisky" productions for British girl group Girls Aloud.

== Release ==
On 21 December 2005 it was announced that Buena had left the Sugababes. Amelle Berrabah was revealed as her replacement one day later. As a result of the line-up change, Taller in More Ways was re-released to feature Berrabah's vocals on three tracks, which included "Red Dress", "Gotta Be You" and "Follow Me Home". "Red Dress" was subsequently chosen as the third single from the album. Buena later revealed that she had been uncomfortable with the original version of the song after recording it, clarifying that she "absolutely hated" it. Upon hearing the new version with Berrabah, she became "quite happy they did it." The song was released as a CD single and digital download on 6 March 2006 by Island Records. It is featured on the Sugababes' greatest hits album, Overloaded: The Singles Collection (2006), and the soundtrack for the 2006 film It's a Boy Girl Thing. The Sugababes confirmed in January 2006 that the B-side to "Red Dress" would be a cover version of Arctic Monkeys' debut single "I Bet You Look Good on the Dancefloor", which replaced the group's 2005 single "Push the Button" at number one on the UK Singles Chart. Upon the recording of the B-side, the Sugababes said: "When our bosses asked us to think of covers for the B-side, we knew which song we would all love to do." Ben Thompson of The Observer praised Berrabah's "bluesy rasp" as a novelty, while Jimmy Draper of Time Out wrote: "It transforms the punky rave-up into a disco stomper that could make even the staunchiest pop-hater get up and dance".

== Reception ==
=== Critical response ===
"Red Dress" received positive reviews from music critics. Stuart McCaighy of This Is Fake DIY described the song as "top of the range pop", and considered it an example that Xenomania "don't keep all their best songs for Girls Aloud." Peter Robinson of The Observer called the track a "thumping tour de force from Xenomania", and noted that it "flirts vivaciously with pop songwriting convention". A journalist from Virgin Media regarded "Red Dress" as an "irresistibly funky effort from the amorphous trio and their producers". AllMusic critic K. Ross Hoffman praised the bassline sampled from Tony Clarke's "Landslide", while Fiona Edwards of Digital Spy applauded the song's bass, beats, and chorus. Nick Southall of Stylus Magazine described the song as an "up-tempo floor-filler" with a "maximalist stomp". Writing for The Daily Telegraph, Joe Muggs praised "Red Dress" as a dancefloor hit; similarly, Digital Spy critics Nick Levine and David Balls considered it one of the group's most danceable singles. A journalist from The Scotsman characterised the track as "mechanically groovy", while a Birmingham Mail critic described it as "a stomping anthem with attitude-drenched verses and killer chorus". Alexis Petridis of The Guardian characterised "Red Dress" as a "brilliant, immaculately written pop song". However, Andrew Mueller of the same publication called it "a lazy and rather too obvious retread" of the group's 2004 single, "In the Middle".

=== Chart performance ===
"Red Dress" debuted at number four on the UK Singles Chart in the issue dated 18 March 2006 with 18,210 copies sold. It was the highest-ranked debut for that week. Taller in More Ways subsequently became the first album by the Sugababes to produce three UK top-five hits. "Red Dress" spent ten weeks on the chart and has sold 100,000 copies in the country, ranking as the group's fourteenth best-selling single in the UK. The song peaked at number 4 on the UK Radio Airplay Chart on 25 March 2006, with an audience of 58.14 million. The song debuted and peaked at number twelve on the Irish Singles Chart. "Red Dress" appeared on the Dutch Top 40 chart at number nine, and peaked at number seven the following week for two non-consecutive weeks. It was the chart's 66th best-performing single of 2006. The single reached the top twenty on the charts in Denmark and Norway, and the top forty on the charts in Belgium (Flanders), Germany, Hungary, and Switzerland. It reached number 41 on the Austrian Singles Chart, and number 61 on the Czech Singles Chart. The song's performance throughout Europe allowed it to chart on the European Hot 100 Singles chart, where it peaked at number fourteen. "Red Dress" debuted and peaked at number 22 on the Australian Singles Chart, where it charted for twelve weeks. The single peaked at number sixteen on the New Zealand Singles Chart and was the group's third consecutive top-twenty hit in the country. A writer from the Coventry Evening Telegraph noted that the line-up change did not affect the song's commercial performance.

== Promotion ==
=== Music video ===
Amelle Berrabah, Heidi Range and Keisha Buchanan wearing red dresses in the music video for "Red Dress".

The accompanying music video for "Red Dress" was directed by Tim Royes and filmed in January 2006. Berrabah revealed details about the music video during an interview that was published on the group's official website, saying: "We're shooting the vid this week with director Tim Royce. We're really looking forward to it as there are going to be lots of costume changes. It's going to have a catwalk show theme with lots of mad outfits – very over the top and extravagant – we can't wait!" Royes went on to direct the music video for Sugababes' single "Easy" in the same year. The Sugababes wore endorsed hosiery in scenes for the video as part of their endorsement with Pretty Polly.

The video begins with close-up shots of Berrabah, Buchanan and Range; all three are wearing red dresses, while Berrabah is also wearing a black mask. Buchanan drops two large, blue feathers on the floor and begins strutting. Berrabah later removes her mask and is shown lying on a red chair. The next scene shows all three members on a fluffy, white couch in hosiery; Range, Buchanan and Berrabah are wearing blue, pink and white tops, respectively. The trio begin strutting together in a linear motion, resembling a catwalk. Range is shown on a bubble chair, and later on a red floor, resting her leg on a disco ball. Throughout the video, the Sugababes continue to strut in red dresses, corresponding with the song's theme. The video ends with Range, Buchanan and Berrabah posing with their hands on their hips. The music video for "Red Dress" earned the Sugababes a 2006 Music Vision Award nomination. The video peaked at number two on the UK TV airplay chart for three weeks.

=== Live performances ===
The Sugababes performed "Red Dress" in Turin, Italy, in February 2006 for Top of the Pops at the Winter Olympics. To promote the song's release, they performed it on 6 March 2006 at the HMV store on Oxford Street, London. The single appeared in the set list for the group's Taller in More Ways tour in 2006, and served as the shows' encore in conjunction with "Push the Button". According to Craig Hope of Chronicle Live, the song "came amid a sea of manic applause". "Red Dress" was featured in the set list for their 2007 tour in support of Overloaded: The Singles Collection. The Sugababes performed the single at the Aintree Pavilion in July 2007 as part of the Liverpool Summer Pops music event. It was the opening song of the gig, and the trio was backed by a five-piece band. The single was performed on 14 September 2007 during their gig at indig02, a live club for smaller music events. Nick Levine of Digital Spy described the performance as "one of the night's pulsating highlights".

The Rockamerica remix of "Red Dress", which is a mashup with Frankie Goes to Hollywood's 1984 single "Two Tribes", was included on the set list for the Sugababes' Change Tour in 2008 and in subsequent live performances. Corresponding with the title of the song, the trio wore red, cellophane dresses for the performance. Berrabah named the outfit one of her favourites to wear during the tour. "Red Dress" was performed at the 2008 Oxygen Festival as part of a set list which included numerous of the group's previous singles. In June 2009, the band performed "Red Dress" at the Cannock Chase Forrest as part of a 75-minute show, and at Canterbury, Kent as the thirteenth song on the set list. "Red Dress" was one of many songs that the group performed on 10 July 2009 at the Riverside Ground in County Durham, England. The fourth line-up of the Sugababes, consisting of Range, Berrabah and Jade Ewen, performed the single in November 2010 at the Yas Hotel in Abu Dhabi, as part of a set list. The trio played the song in September 2011 during their gig at London's nightclub, G-A-Y, in which they wore coordinating, pastel rubber outfits.

The song was performed on the Sugababes UK & Europe Tour in 2022 and the Sugababes '25 Tour, much to the surprise of Sugababes fans, due to Buchanan and Buena both stating that they hated singing the song. For these performances, the song was changed back to its original arrangement; albeit with the drums switching to half-time during the choruses.

== Formats and track listings ==
- UK CD1 / European CD Single
1. "Red Dress" (radio edit) – 3:37
2. "I Bet You Look Good on the Dancefloor" – 2:47
- UK CD2 / European CD Maxi
1. "Red Dress" – 3:38
2. "Red Dress" (Cagebaby remix) – 5:08
3. "Red Dress" (Dennis Christopher vocal mix) – 7:16
4. "Red Dress" (video)
- Australian CD
1. "Red Dress" – 3:38
2. "I Bet You Look Good on the Dancefloor" – 2:47
3. "Red Dress" (Cagebaby remix) – 5:08
4. "Red Dress" (Dennis Christopher vocal mix) – 7:16
5. "Red Dress" (video)
- Digital EP
1. "Red Dress" (radio edit) – 3:37
2. "Red Dress" (Cagedbaby remix) – 5:08
3. "Red Dress" (Dennis Christopher vocal mix) – 7:16

== Credits and personnel ==
Credits are adapted from the liner notes of Overloaded: The Singles Collection.

Recording

- Recorded by Dario Dendi at Eden Studios, London
  - Assisted by Chris Poulter and Zoe Smith

Personnel

- Songwriting – Keisha Buchanan, Mutya Buena, Heidi Range, Brian Higgins, Miranda Cooper, Tim Powell, Nick Coler, Shawn Lee, Lisa Cowling, Bob Bradley
- Production – Brian Higgins, Xenomania
- Mixing – Jeremy Wheatley, Tim Powell
  - Mixing (assistant) – Richard Edgeler
- Keyboards – Tim Powell, Brian Higgins, "Rolf" Larcombe, Jon Shave
- Programming – Tim Powell, Brian Higgins
- Bass – Bob Bradley
- Guitars – Nick Coler, Shawn Lee

== Charts ==
=== Weekly charts ===
Weekly chart performance for "Red Dress"
Chart (2006)	Peak position
Australia (ARIA)	22
Austria (Ö3 Austria Top 40)	41
Belgium (Ultratop 50 Flanders)	35
Czech Republic Airplay (ČNS IFPI)	61
Denmark Airplay (Tracklisten)	14
European Hot 100 (Billboard)	14
Germany (GfK)	27
Hungary (Dance Top 40)	22
Ireland (IRMA)	12
Netherlands (Dutch Top 40)	7
Netherlands (Single Top 100)	10
New Zealand (Recorded Music NZ)	16
Norway (VG-lista)	17
Romania (Romanian Top 100)	51
Scottish Singles Sales (Official Charts)	2
Switzerland (Schweizer Hitparade)	31
UK Singles (Official Charts)	4
UK Airplay (Music Week)	4
Ukraine Airplay (TopHit)	180

=== Year-end charts ===
Year-end chart performance for "Red Dress"
Chart (2006)	Position
Netherlands (Dutch Top 40)	66
UK Singles (OCC)	102
UK Airplay (Music Week)	35
