= Gotta Be You (Sugababes song) =

Song by Sugababes

from the album Taller in More Ways
- Recorded: 2005
- Studio: D.A.R.P. Studios, Atlanta; Home Recordings, London, England
- Genre: Crunk&B
- Length: 3:40
- Label: Island
- Songwriters: Tricky Stewart; Penelope Magnet; Terius Nash
- Producer: Dallas Austin

"Gotta Be You" is a song by English girl group Sugababes from their fourth studio album, Taller in More Ways (2005). It was written by Tricky Stewart, Penelope Magnet and Terius Nash, while Dallas Austin produced the song. There are two versions of the song, one with vocals by founding member Mutya Buena, and another featuring Amelle Berrabah's vocals, Buena's replacement. "Gotta Be You" is a crunk&B song that lyrically discuss reacting to judgements created by the media. Several music critics noted similarities between the song and "Try Again" by Aaliyah. Upon the release of the album, "Gotta Be You" garnered mixed reviews from critics.

== Writing and recording ==
"Gotta Be You" was written by Tricky Stewart, Penelope Magnet and Terius Nash, and produced by American singer and producer Dallas Austin, who produced four other tracks from Taller in More Ways (2005), including its singles "Push the Button" and "Ugly". The song's engineering process was completed by Rick Shepphard, while the recording engineers were Graham Marsh (producer), Ian Rossiter and Owen Clark. The track was mixed by Jeremy Wheatley for 365 Artists at TwentyOne Studios in London; this was assisted by Richard Edgeler. Austin provided the song's drums and keys, while the guitar and bass guitar were provided by Tony Reyes.

On 21 December 2005, it was announced that group member Mutya Buena had left the Sugababes. Amelle Berrabah was soon announced as her replacement. As a result of the group line-up change, "Gotta Be You", along with two other tracks, "Red Dress" and "Follow Me Home", was re-recorded to feature vocals by Berrabah and the removal of vocals by Buena. All three tracks were featured in a re-issued version of Taller in More Ways that was released in March 2006.

== Composition and lyrics ==
"Gotta Be You"
A 25 second sample of "Gotta Be You", featuring vocals by Amelle Berrabah.

"Gotta Be You" is a crunk&B song that lasts for three minutes and 40 seconds. Ben Hogwood of musicOMH described it as an "electric piece of club R&B". According to group member Keisha Buchanan, the Sugababes are the first British band to incorporate the American sound in their music. Kitty Empire of The Observer called it "brooding R&B" and noted its reminiscence of "Try Again" by American R&B singer, Aaliyah. Similarly, K. Ross Hoffman of Allmusic wrote that "Gotta Be You" "treads melodically close to the song", in which he described the latter as "majestic". Another critic, Nick Southall from Stylus Magazine, wrote that it is "disarmingly close" to "Try Again".

Buchanan explained the song's concept and lyrical interpretation during a track by track analysis of the album on the group's official website, saying: "This song is about reacting to the press when they slag you off, about how they judge you. When we heard the song we loved it. To be honest, any publicity is good publicity whether it's positive or negative, and it's taken us a while to get that. When the press write something negative and something that's untrue, it's hard to look at that in a positive way. We could really relate to the song."

== Critical reception ==
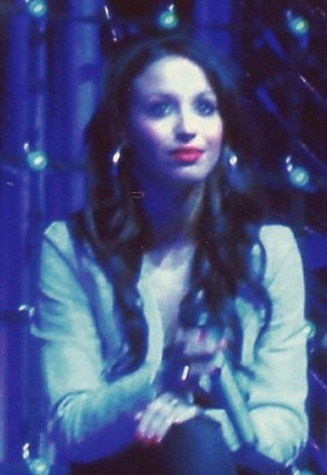
"Gotta Be You" was re-recorded to feature the vocals by Amelle Berrabah (pictured).

Upon the release of Taller in More Ways, "Gotta Be You" garnered generally mixed reviews from music critics. According to Alexis Petridis of The Guardian, Austin "adds a light, but none the less thrilling dusting of monotonal crunk-influenced synthesised honking" to the song. Petridis elaborated that this is "about as far as the album ventures into the realms of hos and playas, fuckin' the atmosphere or otherwise." Ben Hogwood of musicOMH gave a favorable review; he described it as a "dancefloor anthem in the making and surely a future single".

Talia Kraines of the BBC was critical of "Gotta Be You", calling it an "annoying" and "dull r'n'b-lite" track. Hoffman of Allmusic was also unfavorable of the song, writing that it "pillages less successfully" compared to other tracks from the album. He elaborated that despite a "passable foundation of synth-fuzz R&B with trendy tabla-esque skittering", the song "can't help but pale by comparison" to "Try Again". Alex Roginski of The Sydney Morning Herald criticised the songwriting as "flat". According to Joe Muggs of The Daily Telegraph, "Gotta Be You" "feels like a deliberate attempt to woo the US market".

== Credits and personnel ==
Recording

- Recorded at D.A.R.P. Studios, Atlanta & Home Recordings, London.

Personnel

- Songwriting – Tricky Stewart, Penelope Magnet, Terius Nash
- Production – Dallas Austin
- Engineering – Rick Shepphard
- Midi and Sound design – Rick Shepphard
- Recording engineer (assistant): Graham Marsh (producer), Ian Rossiter, Owen Clark
- Mixing – Jeremy Wheatley for 365 Artists at TwentyOne Studios, London.
- Mixing (assistant) – Richard Edgeler
- Drums and keys – Dallas Austin
- Guitar and bass guitar – Tony Reyes

Credits adapted from the liner notes of Taller in More Ways, Island Records.
