= Gotta Be You =

Gotta Be You may refer to:

- "Gotta Be You" (2NE1 song), a 2014 song by 2NE1
- "Gotta Be You" (3T song), a 1996 song by 3T
- "Gotta Be You" (One Direction song), a 2011 song by One Direction
- "Gotta Be You" (Sugababes song), a 2005 song by Sugababes

== See also ==
- "It's Gotta Be You", a 2016 song by Isaiah Firebrace.
