= Taller in More Ways =

2005 studio album by Sugababes

- 2005 cover with Mutya Buena

Studio album by Sugababes
- Released: 10 October 2005
- Recorded: September 2004 – July 2005
- Studios: Eden Studios, Frou Frou Central, Home Recordings, Metropolis (London), DARP Studios (Atlanta)
- Genres: Dance-pop; crunk; R&B
- Length: 45:35
- Label: Island
- Producers: Dallas Austin; Cameron McVey; Jony Rockstar; Guy Sigsworth; Xenomania

Sugababes chronology
| Three (2003) | Taller in More Ways (2005) | Overloaded: The Singles Collection (2006) |

Alternative cover
- 2006 cover featuring Amelle Berrabah

Singles from Taller in More Ways
- 1. "Push the Button" Released: 23 September 2005; 2. "Ugly" Released: 5 December 2005; 3. "Red Dress" Released: 6 March 2006; 4. "Follow Me Home" Released: 5 June 2006

Taller in More Ways is the fourth studio album by British girl group Sugababes, released by Island Records on 10 October 2005. It was primarily produced by Dallas Austin and Jony Rockstar, with additional production from Cameron McVey, Xenomania and Guy Sigsworth. The title of the album was inspired by a line in the album's second single, "Ugly".

The album was preceded by its lead single "Push the Button", which peaked atop the UK Singles Chart, while its second single "Ugly" also achieving commercial success. Founding member Mutya Buena left the Sugababes in December 2005 and was replaced by Amelle Berrabah. As a result, Taller in More Ways was re-released in March 2006 with the addition of a new song, "Now You're Gone", and three re-recorded tracks featuring the vocals of Berrabah: "Gotta Be You", "Follow Me Home" and "Red Dress", with "Red Dress" and "Follow Me Home" becoming and third and fourth single off of Taller in More Ways respectively.

Upon release, Taller in More Ways received generally favourable reviews from music critics. It topped the UK Albums Chart, becoming the group's first domestic number one album. It was certified 2× Platinum by the British Phonographic Industry (BPI). Additionally, it reached the top ten in Ireland, Switzerland, the Netherlands and Austria. To promote the album, the group went on the Taller in More Ways Tour in 2006.

In April 2025, the album was released on vinyl, for the first time, as part of the 2025 Record Store Day.

== Background ==
"Hole in the Head", the number one single from the Sugababes' third studio album Three (2003), was released in the United States during July 2004. During this time, the Sugababes revealed that they would meet with producers in the US to work on their fourth studio album. In August 2004, the Sugababes released "Caught in a Moment", the fourth and final single from Three, and also confirmed that recording for the group's fourth album had commenced. During their break between the autumn of 2004 and summer of 2005, speculation arose about the band's future, which included rumours of a greatest hits album being released and that the group would later split. Band member Heidi Range expressed her distaste with the media speculation, saying: "You know what? At first it would make us angry, then we'd laugh it off and now we don't even pay any attention to it. The tabloids have been saying we're about to split since I joined the band four years ago and I've no idea where it all comes from."

== Composition and lyrics ==
"It's our best album, at least 30 to 40 times better than the last one! There's a track called 'Follow Me Home' which is a step up from 'Stronger' and one called 'Red Dress' which moves on from 'Round Round'. Every track is different and is very diverse including a flavour of RnB crunk."

— Mutya Buena commenting on the album during an interview published on the group's official website.

Taller in More Ways is predominantly a pop record, but also draws influences from electropop and R&B. Priya Elan of The Guardian described the album as a "titanic pop experimentation". Buena stated during an interview that each track on the album is different and diverse. The mood of the album ranges from uptempo pop numbers to slower, downtempo ballads.

The album opens with "Push the Button", an uptempo pop, electropop and electronic song. Instrumentation consists of computer beats and electronics. The song was inspired by a limerance between Buchanan and an artist who collaborated with Austin, and is lyrically about a woman's sexual frustration of being unnoticed by a man.

The next track is "Gotta Be You", a crunk and R&B number that runs through a "monotonal crunk-influenced synthesised honking". The song is lyrically interpreted as reacting to judgements created by the press. It received several comparisons to "Try Again" by Aaliyah.

The third track is "Follow Me Home", a downtempo and romantic R&B ballad, instrumentatally accompanied by of keyboards, a guitar, beats and bass. The romantic song was inspired by Buena's daughter and is lyrically about protecting your loved one.

The fourth track on the album is "Joy Division", which draws influences from dub and nu metal. K. Ross Hoffman of AllMusic described it as a "breezy, ska-punk-tinged" track. The song's is accompanied by keyboards, a guitar, beats and bass, and features the Sugababes singing lines such as "Boy do I turn you round / Isn't this profound". Lyrically, "Joy Division" is about sleazy men; according to Range, "My verse is about a guy who tries to chat you up and conveniently forgets the fact that he's got a wife and kids".

"Red Dress" serves as the fifth track on the album; it is an uptempo pop song that features two choruses. Its instrumentation is composed of keyboards, bass and guitars, while the main riff samples the Northern soul song "Landslide" by Tony Clarke. "Red Dress" features a theme of girl power, and is lyrically about a woman who uses her sexuality to gain power over men.

The sixth track of Taller in More Ways is the midtempo pop rock ballad "Ugly", consisting of acoustic guitars "buoyed by peripheral detail". Its lyrical content is related to self-esteem and body-image concerns; the song received comparisons to "Beautiful" by American recording artist Christina Aguilera and "Unpretty" by American girl group TLC.

"It Ain't Easy", the album's seventh track, is an electro and R&B song backed by a guitar riff, drums and keys. It is reminiscent of that heard on "Personal Jesus" by Depeche Mode. Lyrically, "It Ain't Easy" is about the Sugababes as people and balancing their lives with their careers.

The album's eighth track, "Bruised", contains a repetitive "ta-na-na" backing vocal and is lyrically about a tempestuous relationship. Buchanan revealed that the song is about being in an unhealthy relationship, saying: "Every time they come close to you, you get bruised".

The ninth track of the album is a cover of Animotion's new wave single, "Obsession". Hoffman described it as "sugary synth pop". The song contains "glittering" chord progressions of a 1980s nightclub. According to Talia Kraines of BBC, the cover is an "almost exact reworking" of the original.

This is followed by the progressive electropop track "Ace Reject", lyrically inspired by dysfunctional relationships. Buchanan spoke of the song's concept and meaning, saying: "It's about the fact that we break up and make up and we don't know why."

The UK bonus track, "Better", features an "ooh-ooh-ooh" backing vocal and is lyrically about overcoming one's problems. The song was compared to "Thank You" by Jamelia.

The album's twelfth and closing track is "2 Hearts", an acoustic-driven power ballad that incorporates dark wave and European electropop. The song's instrumentation consists of guitars, horns, beats, bass, percussion and strings. It also features a string grandeur similar to that of Hybrid. The song is reminiscent of "Grace Under Pressure" by Elbow.

== Songs ==
According to Simon Price of The Independent, "It Ain't Easy" is reminiscent of "Rock Is Dead" by Marilyn Manson. Alex Roginski of The Sydney Morning Herald wrote that the song "utilises electro clash for a grinding foray into R&B." K. Ross Hoffman of AllMusic noted that the song "pits a menacingly swung, twangy guitar riff", which according to him is "lifted so blatantly" from Depeche Mode's song, "Personal Jesus". Buchanan spoke of the song's lyrical content and meaning, saying: "It's basically about us as people. It's not easy being where we are now, trying to keep a balance between normality and doing this. When you're content within yourself, you should know how you are, and people around us know what we're like."

Alexis Petridis of The Guardian named it better than the album's lead single, "Push the Button", while also describing it as "Depeche Mode's 'Personal Jesus' rewritten with its existential angst replaced by the travails of teen romance." The Observer's Peter Robinson also noted a similarity between the two songs, writing that the track "breezily pays homage to Depeche Mode's 'Personal Jesus'". He suggested it was one of the album's best tracks. Hoffman wrote that "it's a wonder Martin Gore doesn't get a writing credit" in the song, "against a martial strut and agitated double-time group vocals." Rick Fulton of Daily Record regarded it as one of the album's highlights. However, Ben Hogwood of musicOMH acknowledged that although the song features "nervy vocals" from Buchanan, it takes "much of its source material" from Goldfrapp's song "Train", which according to him is "complete with an unsuccessful bridge passage."

Sugababes performed the song at the Clyde Auditorium in Glasgow, Scotland on 20 March 2006, as part of their UK tour to promote Taller in More Ways. An editor for The Scotsman described the song as a "Goldfrapp-matching" track to "Obsession", and named the performance one of the "best points" of the gig.

"Gotta Be You" is a crunk&B song. Ben Hogwood of musicOMH described it as an "electric piece of club R&B". According to group member Keisha Buchanan, the Sugababes are the first British band to incorporate the American sound in their music. Kitty Empire of The Observer called it "brooding R&B" and noted its reminiscence of "Try Again" by American R&B singer, Aaliyah. Similarly, K. Ross Hoffman of AllMusic wrote that "Gotta Be You" "treads melodically close to the song", in which he described the latter as "majestic". Another critic, Nick Southall from Stylus Magazine, wrote that it is "disarmingly close" to "Try Again".

Buchanan explained the song's concept and lyrical interpretation during a track by track analysis of the album on the group's official website, saying: "This song is about reacting to the press when they slag you off, about how they judge you. When we heard the song we loved it. To be honest, any publicity is good publicity whether it's positive or negative, and it's taken us a while to get that. When the press write something negative and something that's untrue, it's hard to look at that in a positive way. We could really relate to the song."

According to Alexis Petridis of The Guardian, Austin "adds a light, but none the less thrilling dusting of monotonal crunk-influenced synthesised honking" to the song. Petridis elaborated that this is "about as far as the album ventures into the realms of hos and playas, fuckin' the atmosphere or otherwise." Ben Hogwood of musicOMH gave a favorable review; he described it as a "dancefloor anthem in the making and surely a future single".

Talia Kraines of the BBC was critical of "Gotta Be You", calling it an "annoying" and "dull r'n'b-lite" track. Hoffman of AllMusic was also unfavorable of the song, writing that it "pillages less successfully" compared to other tracks from the album. He elaborated that despite a "passable foundation of synth-fuzz R&B with trendy tabla-esque skittering", the song "can't help but pale by comparison" to "Try Again". Alex Roginski of The Sydney Morning Herald criticised the songwriting as "flat". According to Joe Muggs of The Daily Telegraph, "Gotta Be You" "feels like a deliberate attempt to woo the US market".

== Critical reception ==
Professional ratings
Review scores
| Source | Rating |
|---|---|
| AllMusic | 4/5 stars |
| Entertainment Ireland | 3/5 stars |
| Evening Standard | 3/5 stars |
| The Guardian | 3/5 stars |
| The Independent | 3/5 stars |
| The Observer | 5/5 stars |
| Q | 3/5 stars |
| The Scotsman | 2/5 stars |
| Stylus Magazine | B+ |
| Yahoo! Music | 7/10 |

Taller in More Ways received generally favourable reviews from music critics, who praised its strong pop songwriting, coherence, and standout tracks, though some noted a few weaker moments and a lack of innovation. Peter Robinson of The Observer, gave the album 5 out of 5 stars, summarising it as "the cool yet commercial pop queens put a spring in Peter Robinson's step." Yahoo! Music critic Anna Britten found that the album was "as much, and as little, as you would expect. Sugababes don't break ground – they just walk all over it," while Andy Gill from The Independent "by some distance their best effort yet." In his review for The Evening Standard, David Smyth noted a "coherence running through these 12 sleek, funky tracks that means even the inevitable filler doesn't feel out of place." K. Ross Hoffman of AllMusic awarded the album 4 out of 5 stars, labelling it "among their strongest" and favouring "the simple yet effective electro-pop club ditty "Push the Button" [and] even better in that category [the] monstrously funky "Red Dress"," as well as "Follow Me Home" and "Ugly," calling them two "aptly pitched inspirational mini-epics." Hoffman was less favourable about the final three cuts, saying they "fail to leave much of an impression."

Alexis Petridis of The Guardian remarked that "you get the impression that they would be happier making R&B." In conclusion, however, he stated that "the album's strike rate is far higher than you might expect from a manufactured pop act's fourth album; it avoids the obvious pitfalls and its highpoints are genuinely high," giving the album 3 out of 5 stars. Nick Southall from Stylus Magazine gave the album a B+, concluding it as "not the best album in the world or even of the year, not obscurantist schizeclecto meta-pop like Annie or M.I.A. or loaded down with po-mo pop.cult. signifiers like Girls Aloud, it doesn't impart a skewed existential narrative like Britney, but Taller in More Ways is absolutely bursting with tunes, and as such it's hard to resist." Joe Muggs from The Daily Telegraph called Taller in Many Ways "another triumphant pop album [that] shows no sign of spoiling their run of chart successes." While he felt that "there are perhaps one too many slow-to-mid-tempo attempts to appear "grown up" [...] thankfully, especially on the Austin-produced up-tempo tracks, the Sugababes' bad attitude is present and correct." Sydney Morning Herald editor Alex Roginski remarked that some of the writing on the album was "flat," but found that while "if it's not quite as street smart as its makers intended, Taller in Many Ways is still a spirited record paving a fresh pop pathway for the reborn babes."

The album was ranked number 23 on Observer Music Monthly's Top 100 Albums list in 2005.

== Commercial performance ==
Taller in More Ways became a commercial success. On 22 October 2005, the album debuted at number one on the UK Albums Chart with sales of 65,781, becoming the group's first album to top the chart in their native UK. The album also became the group's highest first-week sales. The Sugababes achieved a chart double when "Push the Button" spent a third week at number one while the album debuted at number one. In its ninth week on the chart, Taller in More Ways jumped from number 21 to number 9 on sales of 95,035, almost 30,000 more than its opening week of sales. By December 2005, in just two months of sales, the album had sold almost 400,000 copies in the UK alone. Taller in More Ways was certified 2× Platinum by the British Phonographic Industry (BPI), denoting shipments of 600,000 copies of the album. By November 2006, over a year following its release, Taller in More Ways had sold approximately 860,000 copies in the UK. By October 2008, the album had sold approximately 900,000 copies in the UK alone. Taller in More Ways debuted at number eight on the Irish Albums Chart, and peaked at number seven the following week. It was certified 2× Platinum by the Irish Recorded Music Association (IRMA), indicating shipments of 20,000 copies.

Taller in More Ways debuted and peaked at number five in Austria and logged a total of 18 weeks in the chart, becoming the Sugababes' best-performing album in the country. It was certified Gold by the International Federation of the Phonographic Industry (IFPI), indicating sales of 10,000 copies of the album. The album debuted at number 12 and reached number six on the Swiss Albums Chart; it spent 29 weeks on the chart and was certified Gold by the IFPI, denoting sales of 15,000 copies. In the Netherlands, the album debuted and peaked at number 10 and also logged 29 weeks in the chart. Taller in More Ways reached number 23 in Sweden, number 30 in Norway, and number 36 on the Flanders chart in Belgium. In Denmark, it reached number 32 and was certified Gold by the IFPI, denoting shipments of 10,000 copies. The album peaked at number 11 in Germany and was certified Gold by the Bundesverband Musikindustrie (BVMI), denoting shipments of 100,000 copies. Taller in More Ways also achieved commercial success in Oceania. It debuted at number 36 on the New Zealand Albums Chart and peaked at number 16 seven weeks later, and returned to its peak position in its ninth week on the chart. The album was certified Gold by the Recorded Music NZ (RMNZ), denoting shipments of 7,500 copies. Taller in More Ways reached number 67 in Australia.

In April 2025, the album was released on vinyl for the first time, as part of that year's Record Store Day; the album debuted at number 38 on the UK Vinyl Albums chart.

== Track listing ==
Taller in More Ways track listing
| No. | Title | Writer(s) | Producer(s) | Length |
|---|---|---|---|---|
| 1. | "Push the Button" | Keisha Buchanan; Mutya Buena; Heidi Range; Dallas Austin | Austin | 3:39 |
| 2. | "Gotta Be You" | Christopher Stewart; Penelope Magnet; Terius Nash | Austin | 3:40 |
| 3. | "Follow Me Home" | Buchanan; Buena; Range; Jony Lipsey; Karen Poole; Jeremy Shaw | Jony Rockstar | 3:58 |
| 4. | "Joy Division" | Buchanan; Buena; Range; Lipsey; Cameron McVey | Rockstar | 3:59 |
| 5. | "Red Dress" | Buchanan; Buena; Range; Brian Higgins; Miranda Cooper; Tim Powell; Nick Coler; Shawn Lee; Lisa Cowling; Bob Bradley | Higgins; Xenomania | 3:38 |
| 6. | "Ugly" | Austin | Austin | 3:51 |
| 7. | "It Ain't Easy" | Austin | Austin | 3:05 |
| 8. | "Bruised" | Buchanan; Buena; Range; Guy Sigsworth; Cathy Dennis | Sigsworth | 3:04 |
| 9. | "Obsession" | Holly Knight; Michael Des Barres | Austin | 3:52 |
| 10. | "Ace Reject" | Buchanan; Buena; Range; Cooper; Higgins; Powell | Higgins; Xenomania | 4:15 |
| 11. | "Better" (UK only) | Buchanan; Buena; Range; Peter Biker; Karsten Dahlgaard; Colin Thrope | Biker; Delgardo | 3:44 |
| 12. | "2 Hearts" | Buchanan; Buena; Range; Lipsey; McVey | Rockstar | 4:52 |
| Total length: | | | | 45:35 |

Taller in More Ways – 2006 reissue
| No. | Title | Writer(s) | Producer(s) | Length |
|---|---|---|---|---|
| 13. | "Now You're Gone" | Amelle Berrabah; Buchanan; Range; Pete Kirtley; Tim Hawes; Niara Scarlett | Kirtley; Hawes | 3:55 |

Notes and sample credits

- ^{^[a]} denotes vocal producer
- "Gotta Be You", "Follow Me Home" and "Red Dress" were re-recorded on the 2006 re-issue following Buena's departure from the group, with new member Amelle Berrabah recording the lyrics that were originally sung by Buena. The re-recorded tracks also have brief differences in musical arrangement, and the re-issue exclusive track "Now You're Gone" features Berrabah as well.

== Charts ==
=== Weekly charts ===
2005 weekly chart performance for Taller in More Ways
| Chart (2005) | Peak position |
|---|---|
| Australian Albums (ARIA) | 67 |
| Austrian Albums (Ö3 Austria) | 5 |
| Belgian Albums (Ultratop Flanders) | 36 |
| Danish Albums (Hitlisten) | 32 |
| Dutch Albums (Album Top 100) | 10 |
| European Albums (Billboard) | 5 |
| German Albums (Offizielle Top 100) | 11 |
| Irish Albums (IRMA) | 7 |
| New Zealand Albums (RMNZ) | 16 |
| Norwegian Albums (VG-lista) | 30 |
| Scottish Albums (Official Charts) | 1 |
| Swedish Albums (Sverigetopplistan) | 23 |
| Swiss Albums (Schweizer Hitparade) | 6 |
| UK Albums (Official Charts) | 1 |

2025 weekly chart performance for Taller in More Ways
| Chart (2025) | Peak position |
|---|---|
| UK Vinyl Albums (OCC) | 38 |

=== Year-end charts ===
2005 year-end chart performance for Taller in More Ways
| Chart (2005) | Position |
|---|---|
| UK Albums (OCC) | 22 |

2006 year-end chart performance for Taller in More Ways
| Chart (2006) | Position |
|---|---|
| UK Albums (OCC) | 87 |

== Certifications ==
Certifications for Taller in More Ways
| Region | Certification | Certified units/sales |
|---|---|---|
| Austria (IFPI Austria) | Gold | 15,000^{*} |
| Denmark (IFPI Danmark) | Gold | 20,000^{^} |
| Germany (BVMI) | Gold | 100,000^{^} |
| Ireland (IRMA) | 2× Platinum | 30,000^{^} |
| New Zealand (RMNZ) | Gold | 7,500^{^} |
| Switzerland (IFPI Switzerland) | Gold | 20,000^{^} |
| United Kingdom (BPI) | 3× Platinum | 900,000^{‡} |
Summaries
| Europe (IFPI) | Platinum | 1,000,000^{*} |
^{*} Sales figures based on certification alone.^{^} Shipments figures based on certification alone.^{‡} Sales+streaming figures based on certification alone.

== Taller in More Ways Tour ==
With the album released, the Sugababes announced a UK tour; it began in Sheffield on 17 March 2006, and finished in London on 10 April 2006.

=== Tour dates ===
| Date | City | Country | Venue |
|---|---|---|---|
| 17 March 2006 | Sheffield | England | Sheffield City Hall |
| 18 March 2006 | Liverpool | England | Philharmonic Hall |
| 20 March 2006 | Glasgow | Scotland | Clyde Auditorium |
| 23 March 2006 | Newcastle | England | Newcastle City Hall |
| 25 March 2006 | Manchester | England | Manchester Apollo |
| 27 March 2006 | Hull | England | Hull City Hall |
| 28 March 2006 | Nottingham | England | Nottingham Royal Concert Hall |
| 30 March 2006 | Bristol | England | Colston Hall |
| 31 March 2006 | Plymouth | England | Plymouth Pavilions |
| 1 April 2006 | Bournemouth | England | Bournemouth International Centre |
| 3 April 2006 | Brighton | England | Brighton Centre |
| 4 April 2006 | Ipswich | England | Regent Theatre (Ipswich) |
| 6 April 2006 | Reading | England | Rivermead |
| 7 April 2006 | Cardiff | Wales | Cardiff International Arena |
| 8 April 2006 | Birmingham | England | National Indoor Arena |
| 10 April 2006 | London | England | Hammersmith Apollo |

=== Set list ===
Act 1:

- "Round Round"
- "Freak Like Me"
- "It Ain't Easy"
- "Gotta Be You"

Act 2:

- "Shape/Stronger"
- "Too Lost in You"
- "Run for Cover"
- "I Bet You Look Good on the Dancefloor"
- "Overload"
- "Obsession"
- "Caught in a Moment"
- "Ugly"
- "Follow Me Home"
- "Hole in the Head"

Encore:

- "Red Dress"
- "Push the Button"
