= Ovalia Egg Chair =

Chair designed by Henrik Thor-Larsen

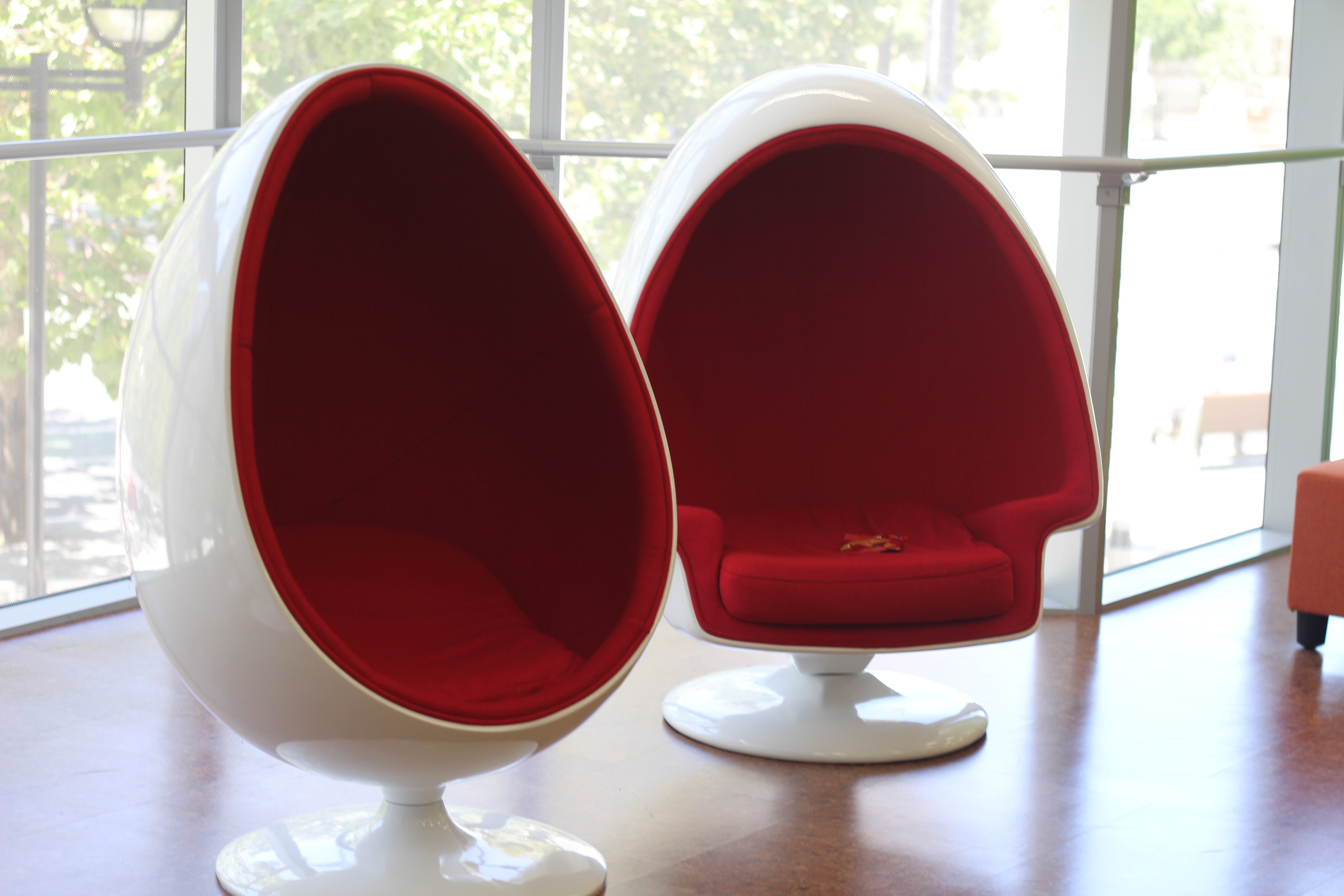
- Designer: Henrik Thor-Larsen
- Date: 1968
- Materials: Shell of glass fibre-reinforced polyester painted shiny white, fabric is wool / nylon with cushions in polyester and synthetic padding
- Height: 130 cm
- Width: 90 cm

The Ovalia Egg Chair was designed by Danish industrial designer Henrik Thor-Larsen and first displayed in 1968. It resembles Eero Aarnio's Ball Chair, but has narrower proportions. It featured in the films Men in Black and Men in Black II.
