= Follow Me Home =

Follow Me Home may refer to:

- Follow Me Home (album), a 2011 album by Jay Rock
- Follow Me Home (film), a 1996 film by Peter Bratt
- "Follow Me Home" (song), a 2006 song by Sugababes
- "Follow Me Home", a 1978 song by Dire Straits from Communiqué
