= Ball Chair =

Chair design by Eero Aarnio

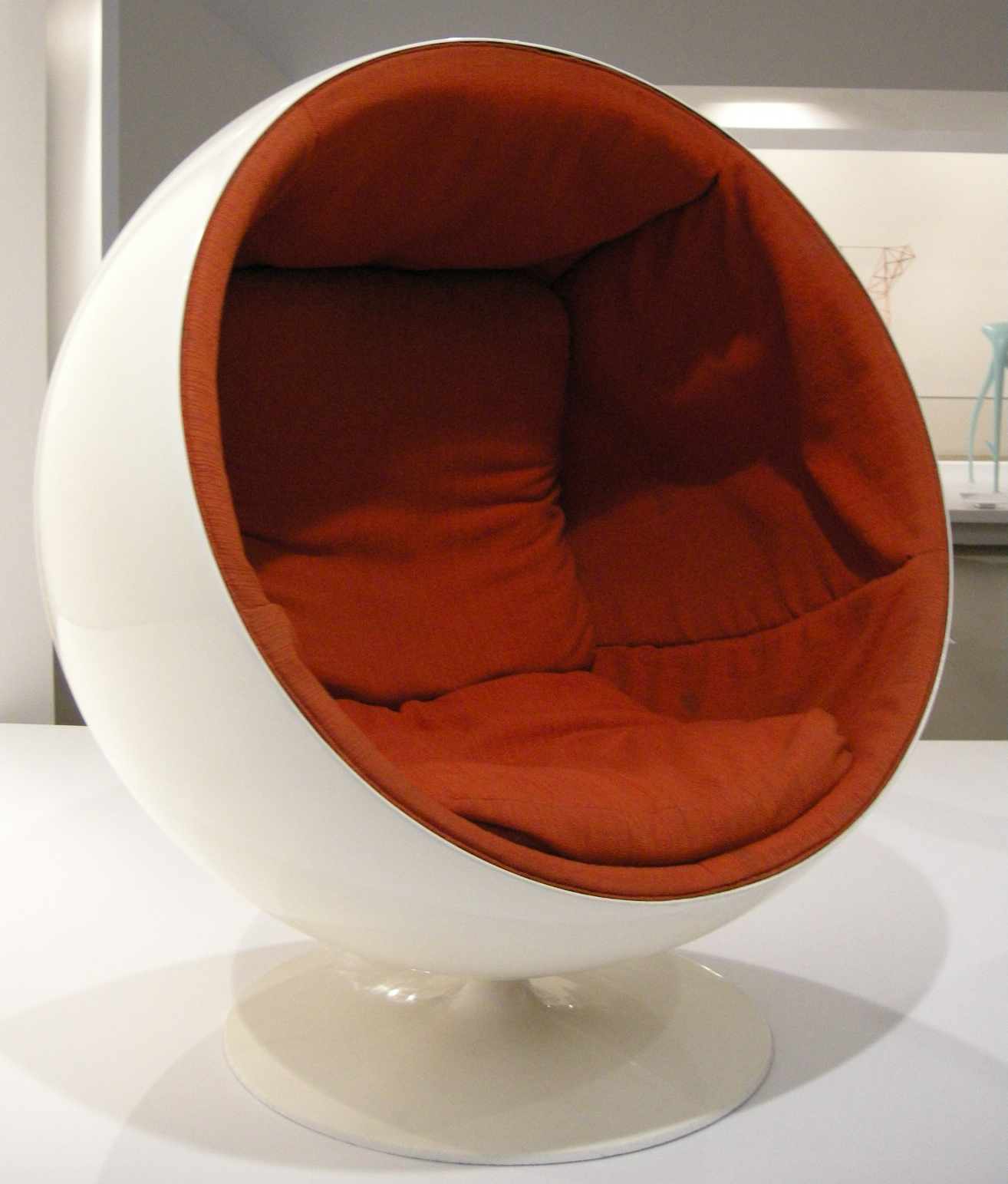
- Eero Aarnio's Ball Chair
- Designer: Eero Aarnio
- Date: 1963
- Made in: Finland
- Materials: Acrylic frame. Steel swivel pedestal. Fabric or leather inner.
- Style / tradition: Modernist
- Height: 47.25 in (120.0 cm)
- Width: 41.25 in (104.8 cm)
- Depth: 38.2 in (97 cm)

The Ball Chair was designed by Finnish furniture designer Eero Aarnio in 1963. The Ball Chair is also known as the globe chair and is famous for its unconventional shape. It is considered a classic of industrial design. More recent versions have increased the overall size and added features, including music speakers and MP3 player integration.

== History ==
According to the chair's designer, Eero Aarnio:

The idea of the chair was very obvious. We had moved to our first home and I had started my free-lance career in 1962.

We had a home but no proper big chair, so I decided to make one, but some way a really new one.

After some drawing I noticed that the shape of the chair had become so simple that it was merely a ball. I pinned the full scale drawing on the wall and sat in the chair to see how my head would move when sitting inside it. Being the taller one of us I sat in the chair and my wife drew the course of my head on the wall. This is how I determined the height of the chair. Since I aimed at a ball shape, the other lines were easy to draw, just remembering that the chair would have to fit through a doorway.

After this I made the first prototype myself using an inside mould, which has been made using the same principle as a glider fuselage or wing. I covered the plywood body mould with wet paper and laminated the surface with fiberglass, rubbed down the outside, removed the mould from inside, had it upholstered and added the leg. In the end I installed the red telephone on the inside wall of the chair. The naming part of the chair was easy, the BALL CHAIR was born.

— Eero Aarnio

== In popular culture ==
The ball chair has been used in films to evoke the futuristic style of the 1960s, or to suggest the villainy of a person who sits shadowed within its depths. Examples include:

- The Prisoner (1967)
- Moon Zero Two (1969)
- Tommy (1975)
- Dazed and Confused (1993)
- Mars Attacks! (1996)
- Men in Black (1997)

The ball chair also appears on the cover of the fourth volume of the manga Spy × Family, with Bond, the Pyrenean Mountain Dog owned by the main characters, sitting on it.

A Clockwork Orange (1971) featured a scene with an egg-shaped sort of ball chair futon.

For the cover of American singer Jennette McCurdy's self-titled debut album, she is pictured in a pink ball chair.

== See also ==
- List of chairs
- Bubble Chair
- Ovalia Egg Chair
