= Eero Aarnio =

Finnish industrial designer (born 1932)

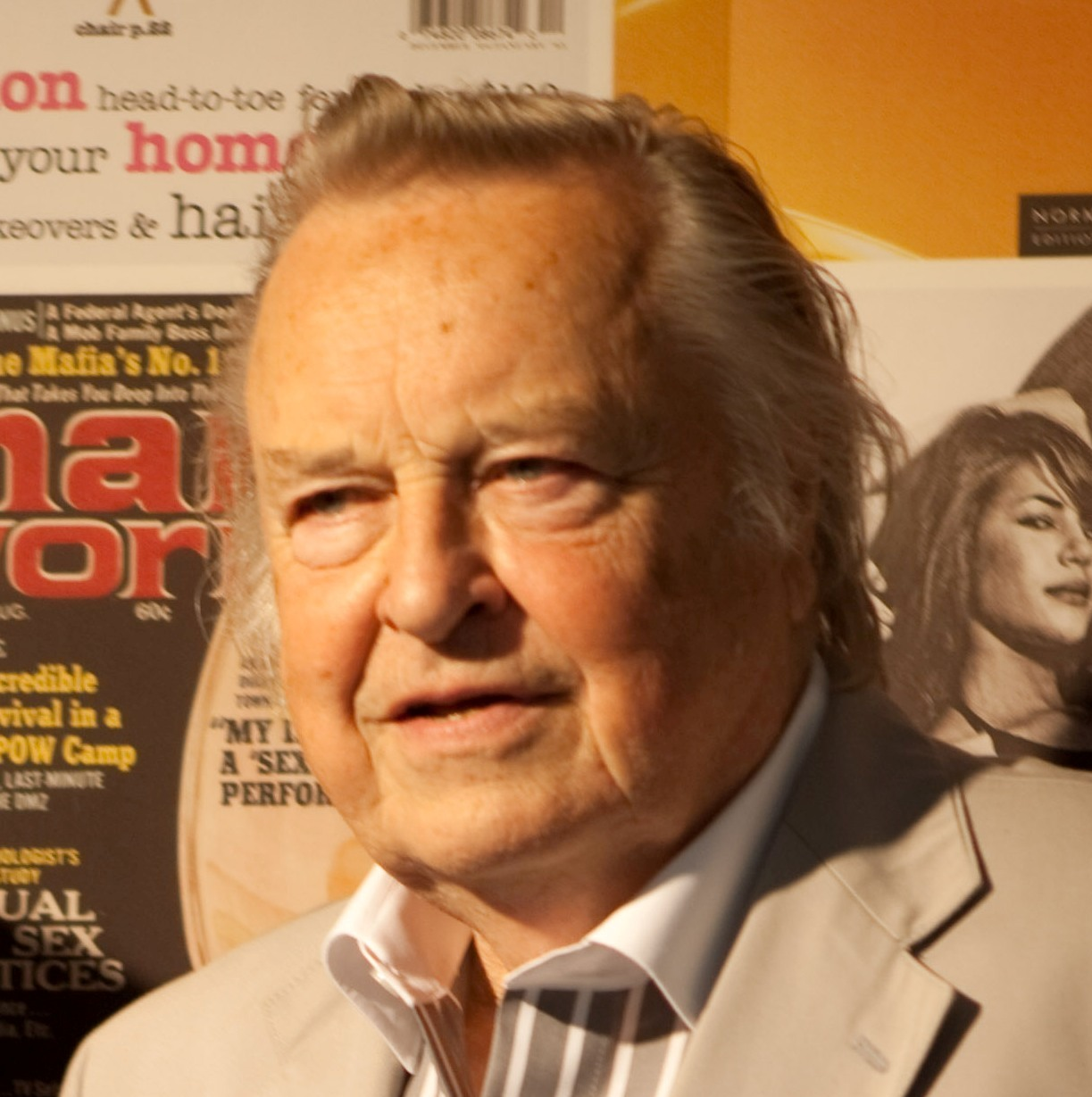
- Born: 21 July 1932
- Education: Aalto University School of Arts, Design and Architecture
- Occupation: Designer, furniture designer
- Website: eeroaarnio.com

Eero Aarnio (born 21 July 1932) is a Finnish designer, noted for his innovative furniture designs in the 1960s, such as his plastic and fibreglass chairs. He was born in Helsinki.

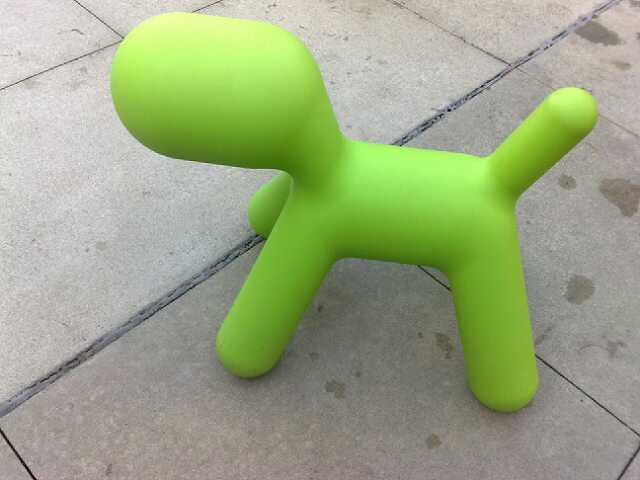
Puppy toy by Eero Aarnio at the Googleplex, 2008

== Life and career ==
Aarnio studied architecture at the Institute of Industrial Arts in Helsinki and graduated in 1960. He started his own office in 1962. The following year, he introduced his Ball Chair, a hollow sphere on a stand, open on one side to allow a person to sit within. The Ball Chair was introduced to the international public at the Asko stand at the Cologne furniture fair in 1966. The similar Bubble Chair was clear and suspended from above. Other innovative designs included his Pastil Chair (a beanbag-like molded armchair), and Tomato Chair (a seat molded between three supporting spheres). His Screw Table, as the name suggests, had the appearance of a flat head screw driven into the ground. He was awarded the American Industrial Design award in 1968.

Aarnio's designs were an important aspect of 1960s popular culture, and could often be seen as part of sets in period science-fiction films. Because his designs used very simple geometric forms, they were ideal for such productions.

Eero Aarnio continues to create new designs, including toys and furniture for children. He was awarded the Compasso d'Oro in 2008 for a design called Trioli, a combination rocking horse and child-sized chair which is part of a collection for Magis.

Many of Aarnio's original designs are today manufactured by Eero Aarnio Originals, which was established in 2016.

In Tite Kubo's manga series Bleach, the character Aaroniero Arruruerie is named after Eero Aarnio.

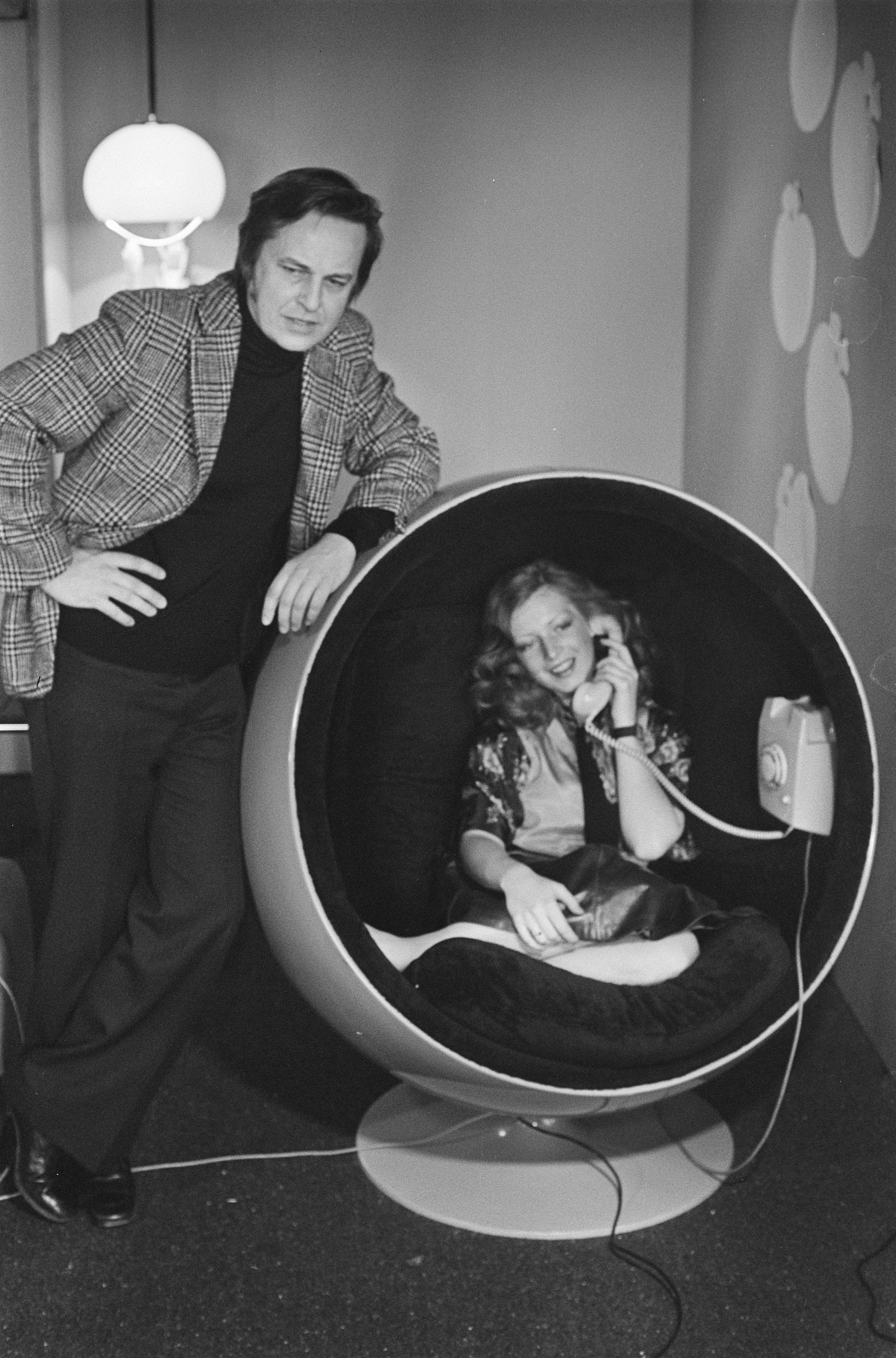
Eero Aarnio pictured with a modified version of his Ball chair (c. 1975)
