= Follow Me Home (song) =

Single by Sugababes

from the album Taller in More Ways
- B-side: "Living for the Weekend"
- Released: 5 June 2006
- Recorded: 2005
- Studio: Metropolis (London, England)
- Genre: Electropop; R&B
- Length: 3:58
- Label: Island
- Songwriters: Keisha Buchanan; Mutya Buena; Heidi Range; Jonathan Lipsey; Karen Poole; Jeremy Shaw
- Producer: Jony Rockstar

Sugababes singles chronology
"Red Dress" (2006)	"Follow Me Home" (2006)	"Easy" (2006)

Music video
- "Follow Me Home" on YouTube

"Follow Me Home" is a song by British girl group the Sugababes, released as the fourth single from their fourth studio album, Taller in More Ways (2005). The pop and R&B ballad was written by band members Keisha Buchanan, Mutya Buena and Heidi Range, with Jony Rockstar, Karen Poole and Jeremy Shaw. The producer, Rockstar, developed the idea of a close person as its inspiration. Buena wrote a verse about her daughter, while Buchanan wrote a verse based on her close friend. The song was released as the album's fourth single on 5 June 2006 and contains vocals from Amelle Berrabah in replacement of Buena's, who left the band in December 2005.

"Follow Me Home" received mixed reviews from critics. Although its instrumentation and the group's vocals were praised, the song was criticised as tedious and uninspiring. The single reached the top forty in Ireland and the United Kingdom, and also charted in Romania, Slovakia, and on the European Hot 100 singles chart. The music video for "Follow Me Home" was directed by Tony Tremlett and filmed in Prague, the Czech Republic. It features the Sugababes in a winter environment and contains various scenes of the group in a large house. The Sugababes performed "Follow Me Home" at the O2 ABC Glasgow, the NIA Academy and on Top of the Pops.

== Development and composition ==
"Follow Me Home"
A 25 second sample of "Follow Me Home" featuring a "string grandeur" from Welsh producers, Hybrid.

"Follow Me Home" was written by the Sugababes—Keisha Buchanan, Mutya Buena, and Heidi Range—in collaboration with Jonathan Lipsey, Karen Poole, and Jeremy Shaw, for the group's fourth studio album, Taller in More Ways (2005). Lipsey developed the idea of a close person as the song's inspiration. Buena wrote the first verse based upon her daughter Tahlia, who was born in March 2005. While writing the verse, she pondered questions such as 'What would you say to her if she was ever in trouble?', and 'How would you say, I'll always be there for you?'. Buena wanted people to interpret the verse in different ways, and stated that the lyrics came naturally. Buchanan drew inspiration from her close friend when she wrote the other verse. Lipsey produced the song under his production name Jony Rockstar. "Follow Me Home" was mixed and engineered at Metropolis Studios by Tom Elmhirst and Richard Wilkinson, respectively.

"Follow Me Home" is an electropop and R&B ballad. Stuart Heritage described it as an "R&B-tinged ballad". Instrumentation consists of keyboards, a guitar, beats and bass, which were provided by Shaw, Rockstar and Cameron McVey. According to Alex Roginski of Sydney Morning Herald, the song is "fleshed out with the string grandeur" of Welsh producers Hybrid, and channels European electropop music. The main concept of "Follow Me Home" is romance, and the song's lyrical content is about protecting your loved one. During the chorus, the Sugababes sing: "I won't walk away / I'll stand by your side / I'm here for you / For the rest of our lives".

== Release and reception ==
In December 2005, Buena left the Sugababes due to "personal reasons", and was replaced by Amelle Berrabah in the same month. Some tracks on Taller in More Ways were subsequently re-recorded to feature Berrabah's vocals in replacement of Buena's; these included "Gotta Be You", "Follow Me Home" and "Red Dress". Buena expressed her disappointment with the re-recording of "Follow Me Home", saying: "My verse was talking about my daughter, it was personal." The song was announced as the fourth and final single from Taller in More Ways, and was released as a CD single and digital download on 5 June 2006. The CD single contains the radio edit of the song in addition to two remixes. The digital release features a cover of English band Hard-Fi's single "Living for the Weekend".

=== Critical response ===
"Follow Me Home" received mixed reviews from critics. K. Ross Hoffman of AllMusic described it as an "aptly pitched inspirational mini-epic", while Stylus Magazine's Nick Southall complimented the song's "luscious, romantic strings." Talia Kraines of BBC noted the song as having a near-level standard of the group's 2003 single, "Too Lost in You". QX gave the song seven out of ten stars, writing: "With this film themed track they’re staying true to their roots and retain their position as leaders amidst the all-girl band rankings". Stuart Heritage of Hecklerspray wrote that the song "benefits from some lovely strings and gorgeous, sultry vocals", although admitted that the single is not as exciting as the album's previous ones. Daily Record's Rick Fulton described the song as one of the group's more thoughtful tracks, but admitted that it lacks "bite". He applauded the Soul Seekerz Vocal Mix version as "breathing life" into it. Alexis Petridis of The Guardian criticised the song as tedious and stated that it "is every bit as gripping as new parents foisting their baby photos on you". Linda McGee of RTÉ.ie considered it "nothing special".

=== Commercial performance ===
"Follow Me Home" debuted and peaked at number 32 on the UK Singles Chart in the issue dated 17 June 2006. The following week, the song dropped ten places to number 42, and in its third and last week on the chart, it fell to number 72. It is the group's lowest-charting single in the UK, and one of their lowest-selling singles. The song achieved more success on the Irish Singles Chart, where it peaked at number 25 and spent four weeks on the chart. The song debuted at number 88 on the Romanian Top 100 singles chart, and peaked at number 64 the following week. "Follow Me Home" achieved minor success on the Slovak Singles Chart, where it peaked at number 93. The single's performance throughout Europe allowed it to chart on the European Hot 100 singles chart, peaking at number 91.

== Promotion ==
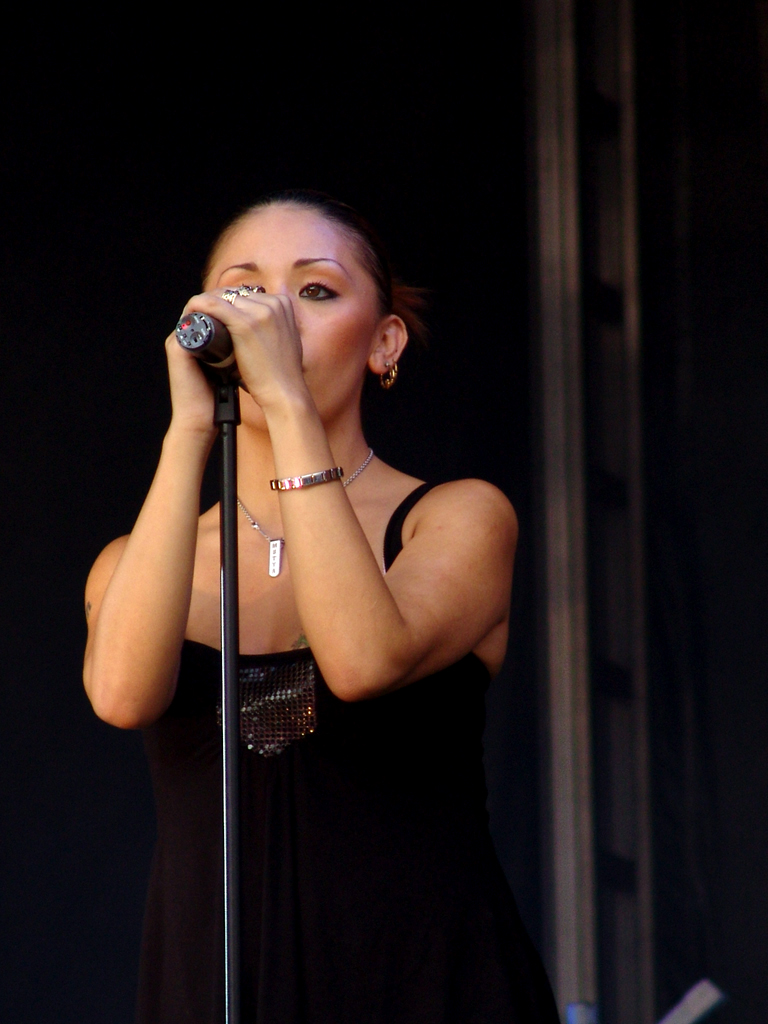
Mutya Buena publicly expressed her dissatisfaction with the video.

=== Music video ===
The music video for "Follow Me Home" was directed by Toby Tremlett, who collaborated with the group on the video for their single "Ugly". Filming of the video took place in Prague, the Czech Republic, and most scenes were filmed in a large house. It is set in winter time and features the Sugababes wearing winter clothing such as thick coats and scarves. The video was released onto the iTunes Store on 23 May 2006 and is featured on the song's CD release. The video opens with a scene of an alcohol bottle and a glass next to it. It then cuts to a scene of Berrabah on a couch, while follow-up scenes show Buchanan against a wall and Range on a bed.

An elderly man is shown by a pool located in the house, while a young girl in a swimsuit is on the other side of it. Another elderly man enters a room in the house where there is another girl. Throughout the video, various scenes of older men and younger women appear. Towards the end of the video, Berrabah, Buchanan and Range are shown standing outside in the dark. A car stops next to the trio and they enter it. In the last scene, an elderly man watches by as the car drives off. Avril Cadden from the Sunday Mail praised the video as "great". Former group member Buena expressed her dissatisfaction with it, saying: "I just saw a bunch of perverted men and paedophile guys". The video reached number eight on the UK TV airplay chart.

=== Live performances ===
The Sugababes performed "Follow Me Home" in October 2005 at the O2 ABC Glasgow, where they played to a crowd of 300 competition winners to promote the release of Taller in More Ways. The song was included in the set list for the group's Taller in More Ways tour. Gurdip Thandi from the Birmingham Mail described their performance at Birmingham's NIA Academy as "polished". In June 2006, following its release as a single, the group performed "Follow Me Home" on Top of the Pops.

== Track listings and formats ==
- CD1 single
1. "Follow Me Home" (Radio Edit) – 3.23
2. "Red Dress" (Kardinal Beats Remix) – 3.48
3. "Follow Me Home" (Soul Seekerz Vocal Mix) – 6.53
4. "Follow Me Home" (Video) – 3.23
- CD2 single / digital download
1. "Follow Me Home" (Amelle Mix) – 3:59
2. "Living for the Weekend" (Live Radio 1 Session) – 3:12

== Credits and personnel ==
Credits are adapted from the liner notes of Taller in More Ways.

Recording

- Recorded and mixed at Metropolis Studios, London

Personnel

- Songwriting – Keisha Buchanan, Mutya Buena, Heidi Range, Jonathan Lipsey, Karen Poole, Jeremy Shaw
- Production – Jony Rockstar
- Mixing – Tom Elmhirst
- Engineering – Richard Wilkinson
- Keyboards and guitar – Jeremy Shaw
- Beats – Jony Rockstar
- Bass – Cameron McVey

== Charts ==
Weekly chart performance for "Follow Me Home"
Chart (2006)	Peak position
European Hot 100 (Billboard)	91
Ireland (IRMA)	25
Romania (Romanian Top 100)	64
Slovakia Airplay (ČNS IFPI)	93
UK Singles (OCC)	32
UK Airplay (Music Week)	24
