= Bubble chair =

Chair designed by Eero Aarnio in 1968

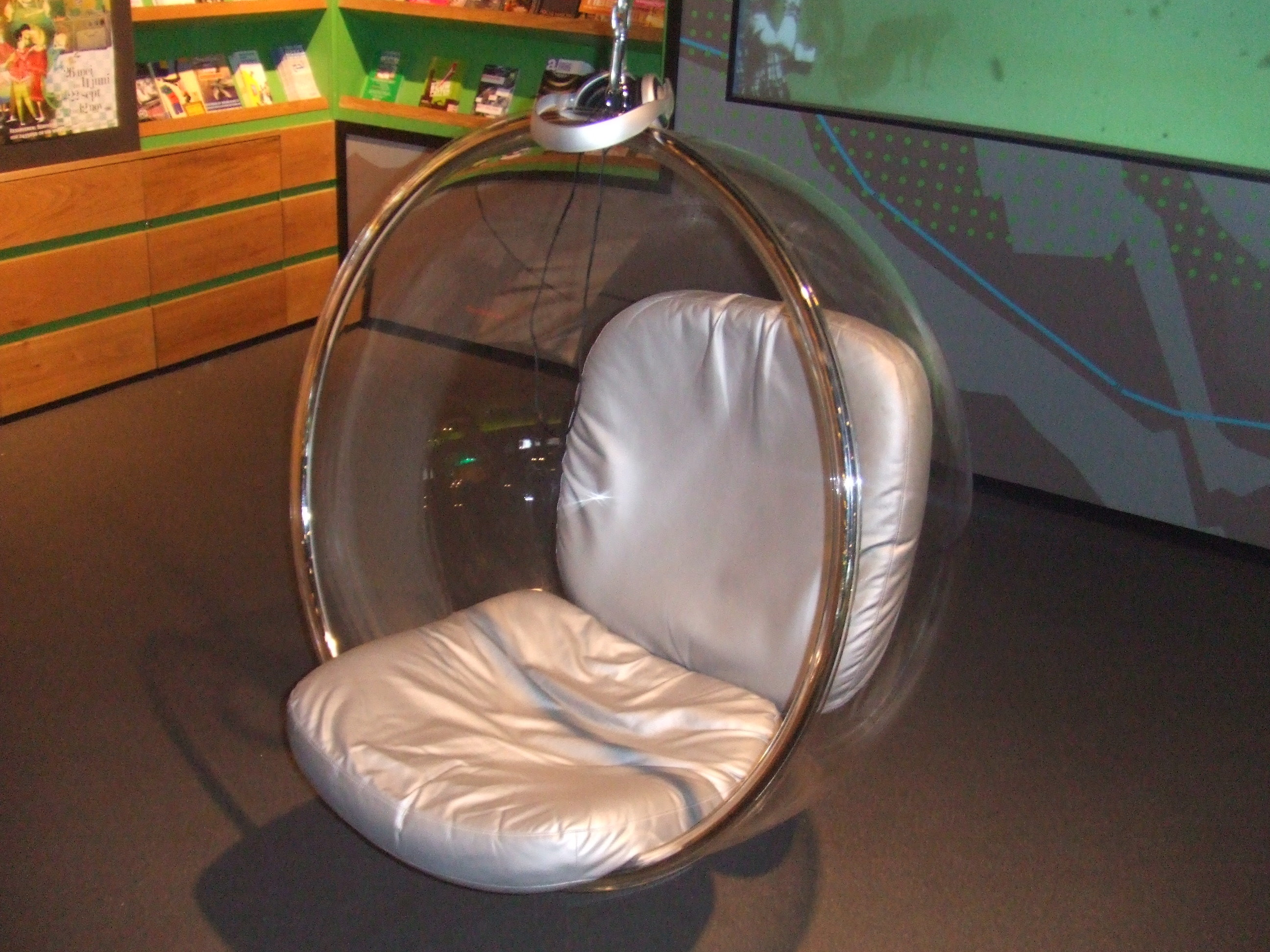
- Designer: Eero Aarnio
- Date: 1968
- Made in: Finland
- Materials: Steel, acrylic, fabric, leather
- Style / tradition: Modernist

The bubble chair was designed by Finnish furniture designer Eero Aarnio in 1968. It is based on his Ball Chair. The main difference is that the Bubble Chair is attached to the ceiling with a chain, while being made of transparent material which lets the light inside from all directions. The acrylic is heated and blown into a round shape, similar to a soap bubble, within a solid steel frame. It's about an industrial design classic and has advanced the usage of plastics in furniture design. The chair is considered modernist or Space Age in design and is often used to symbolize the 1960s period.

== In popular culture ==
In the 2005 Star Trek: Enterprise episode "The Aenar", it was used in the Aenar city.

== See also ==
- List of chairs
- Ball Chair
- Philippe Starck, designer of the Bubble Club Armchair and Sofa
