= Push the Button (Sugababes song) =

2005 single by Sugababes

Single by Sugababes

from the album Taller in More Ways
- B-side: "Favourite Song"; "Like the Weather"
- Released: 23 September 2005
- Recorded: 2005
- Studio: DARP (Atlanta, Georgia); Home (London, England)
- Genre: Electropop; R&B
- Length: 3:36
- Label: Island
- Songwriters: Dallas Austin; Keisha Buchanan; Mutya Buena; Heidi Range
- Producer: Dallas Austin

Sugababes singles chronology
"Caught in a Moment" (2004)	"Push the Button" (2005)	"Ugly" (2005)

Music video
- "Push the Button" on YouTube

"Push the Button" is a song recorded by English girl group the Sugababes for their fourth studio album Taller in More Ways (2005). Composed by Dallas Austin and the Sugababes, it was inspired by an infatuation that group member Keisha Buchanan developed with another artist. Musically, the song is an electropop and R&B song with various computer effects. It was released as the lead single from Taller in More Ways on 23 September 2005, by Island Records.

"Push the Button" received positive reviews from music critics, who praised its conception and production, with some naming it one of the best pop singles of the 2000s. Becoming one of the group's most commercially successful releases, the song peaked at number one in Austria, Ireland, New Zealand, and the United Kingdom, and reached the top five across Europe and in Australia. It was nominated for Best British Single at the 2006 Brit Awards.

Matthew Rolston directed the accompanying music video for "Push the Button", which was filmed in Shepherd's Bush, London and features the Sugababes flirting with three men in a lift. The group performed the song at numerous festivals and events, such as Oxegen 2008 and the V Festival 2008.

Joy Anonymous released a UK garage remix of the song re-titled "Joy (Push the Button)" on 22 December 2023, with the Sugababes also being credited. The partially re-recorded version includes new vocals from original group members Mutya Buena and Siobhán Donaghy.

== Development and concept ==
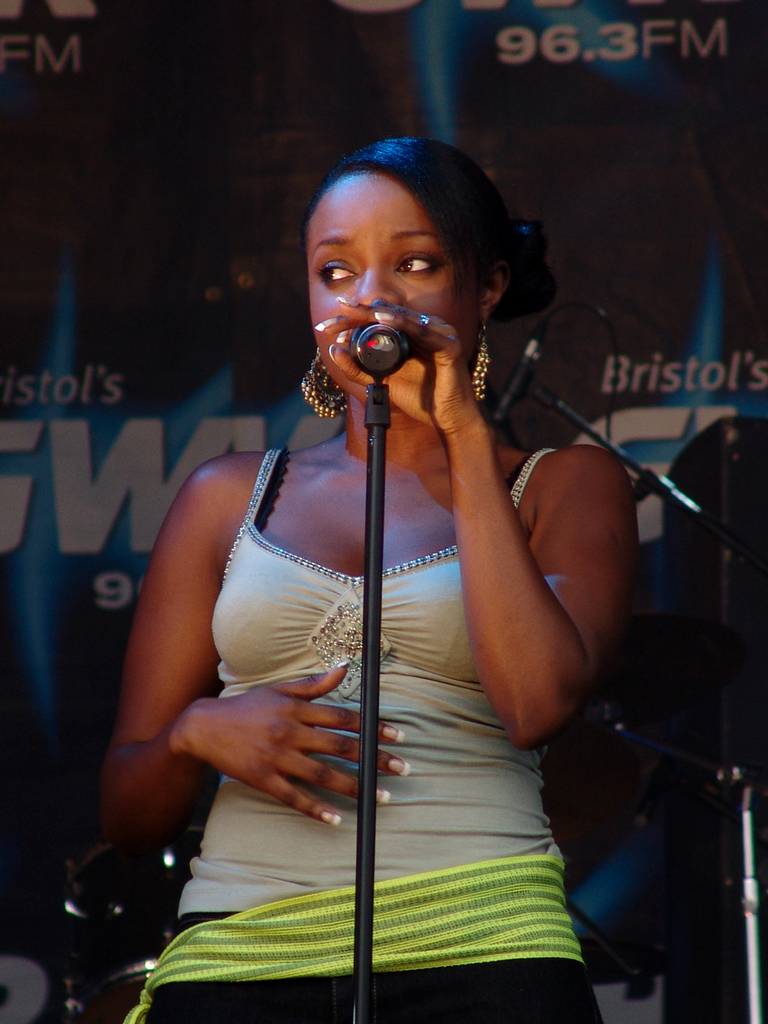
"Push the Button" was inspired by a crush that Keisha Buchanan developed with another artist.

Development of "Push the Button" began while the Sugababes travelled to the United States to work on their fourth studio album, Taller in More Ways (2005). American producer and songwriter Dallas Austin collaborated with the group during the album's initial stages of development. He visited London to work with them, although the group later travelled to the US and stayed with him at his mansion in Atlanta, Georgia. Austin wrote five tracks for the album, including "Push the Button", which he composed in collaboration with the Sugababes. According to group member Heidi Range, the song was "the very last thing" completed for the album.

"Push the Button" was conceptualised after group member Keisha Buchanan developed an infatuation with another artist who was collaborating with Austin. Buchanan told Jess Cartner-Morley of The Guardian that she made advances towards the man, but he was unaware of her intentions: "I really liked this guy, so I'd be like, there's this good movie coming out, you know, dropping hints. And he'd be like, that movie sounds great, let me know what it's like if you go see it. I knew he liked me too but he just wasn't getting what I was trying to say." Austin advised Buchanan to tell the man to "push that button" or she would eventually move on. In a video on her songwriting experiences posted onto her YouTube channel in July 2020, Buchanan said that Austin teased her relentlessly about her crush after an outing by rapping and playing the keyboard; she then returned his bantering and the song instantly developed from there. She also said that Austin encouraged her to imagine she was speaking directly to her crush for the spoken word middle-8 section, and she improvised her speech from there.

Mutya Buena, another member of the Sugababes, clarified Buchanan's encounter with the artist to Hot Press magazine's Jackie Hayden, saying: "We all knew there was something going on between them at the time, but we try to give each other space." She described "Push the Button" as a song "with meaning and real life references", and characterised it as having a "street vibe". Austin produced the song, which was recorded at DARP Studios in Atlanta & Home Recordings, London. "Push the Button" was mixed by Jeremy Wheatley at TwentyOne Studios, London, in collaboration with Richard Edgeler. Rick Shepphard engineered the song.

== Composition and lyrics ==
"Push the Button"
A 23-second audio sample of "Push the Button", which combines electropop with American R&B, as noted by Joe Muggs of The Daily Telegraph.

"Push the Button" is an uptempo electropop and R&B song. AllMusic's K. Ross Hoffman called it an "electropop club ditty", while Joe Muggs of The Daily Telegraph noted that Austin's production combines "raucous" electropop with "slick" American R&B. According to the digital sheet music published by Hal Leonard Corporation, "Push the Button" was composed in the key of A-flat major using common time, with a fast-paced tempo of 126 beats per minute. The song's instrumentation is composed of drums, keys, a guitar and a bass guitar.

The production consists of various computer beats and electronic effects. The song contains an ascending bridge incorporated into the chorus, which consists of the lines: "If you're ready for me boy / You'd better push the button and let me know / Before I get the wrong idea and go." Lyrically, the song is about a woman's sexual frustration of being unnoticed by a man. Joe Macare of Stylus Magazine described Buena's delivery of the lyric "my sexy ass" as "carefree", and noted that the lyrics adapt an "idiosyncratic approach" to the English language. Musically, "Push the Button" received comparisons to the sound of pop group ABBA.

== Release and reception ==
"Push the Button" was announced as the lead single from Taller in More Ways in August 2005. Island Records released it as a CD single and digital download on 26 September 2005 with an accompanying B-side titled "Favourite Song", composed by the Sugababes, Cameron McVey, and Jony Lipsey. An extended play was released, featuring a DJ Prom remix of the song, and the B-side "Like the Weather", which was written by the Sugababes, Cathy Dennis, and Guy Sigsworth. "Push the Button" is included on the Sugababes' greatest hits album, Overloaded: The Singles Collection.

"Push the Button" received positive reviews from many critics. Linda McGee from RTÉ.ie commended the song's beat and melody, and named it the album's best track. The song received a similar response from K. Ross Hoffman of AllMusic, who noted it as one of the album's highlights, and praised its simplicity and effectiveness. The Guardian's Alexis Petridis considered the melody as "sweet and addictive as Smarties", while Kitty Empire of the same publication wrote that the track's "surface simplicity masks a hook that won't let go". Writing for Daily Record, reporter John Dingwall regarded the song as "enormously catchy and retro sounding".

A journalist from the Liverpool Daily Post characterised "Push the Button" as "another edgy stomper" and said that it capitalises on the Sugababes' "streetwise credentials and individual vocal strengths". Observer Music Monthly described the song's lyrics as "perfect pop" and recognised it as one of 2005's best singles. The song is a "ray of melodic sunshine" according to Rafael Behr of The Observer, who lauded its catchiness. Jerusalem Post critic Harry Rubenstein described "Push the Button" as an "infectious Abba-esque soundscape". Paul Taylor from the Manchester Evening News called it one the album's best moments and highlighted Austin's contribution. A writer for Virgin Media praised his production of the song, in addition to its chorus, but criticised the Sugababes' performance as "lacklustre".

== Commercial performance ==
"Push the Button" debuted on the Irish Singles Chart on 29 September 2005 at number two. The song topped the chart for the next three weeks, and was the group's first number-one single in Ireland. "Push the Button" entered the UK Singles Chart on 2 October 2005 at number one, a position it held for three consecutive weeks. It became the Sugababes' fourth single to reach number one in the UK. During the song's third week on the chart, the Sugababes were simultaneously number one on the UK's singles, albums, and download chart. "Push the Button" had sold 1,070,000 units in the UK as of March 2025, and is the Sugababes' second highest-selling single in Britain behind "About You Now".

"Push the Button" entered the Austrian Singles Chart at number one, and remained in the position for five weeks. The song peaked at number two on the German Singles Chart, and was the third most-played British track on German radio in 2005. It was the country's 86th most successful single of the 2000s. The single peaked at number two in Belgium (Flanders), Hungary, Norway, and Romania, and reached number three in the Czech Republic, Denmark, and Switzerland. The song peaked at number three on the Dutch Top 40 chart for six consecutive weeks, and spent two weeks at number four on the Swedish Singles Chart.

"Push the Button" debuted at number 24 on the Australian Singles Chart in the issue dated 30 October 2005. After weeks of fluctuating on the chart, the song peaked at number three on 15 January 2006. It became the Sugababes' most successful single in Australia. The single was certified platinum by the Australian Recording Industry Association (ARIA), denoting shipments of 70,000 copies. "Push the Button" entered the New Zealand Singles Chart on 14 November 2005 at number five, and peaked at number one on 23 January 2006 for three consecutive weeks. It was the group's first number-one single on the chart, and was certified gold by the Recording Industry Association of New Zealand, indicating sales of 7,500 copies.

== Music video ==
The music video for "Push the Button" was directed by American director Matthew Rolston, who collaborated with the Sugababes on the videos for their singles "Hole in the Head" and "In the Middle", and was produced by Lindsay Turnham for Exposure Films. It was filmed in Shepherd's Bush, London, in July 2005. The men who appear in the video are models and dancers, and were selected based on their dancing ability. Buena described the video as "really cheeky" and stated that it "turned out really great in the end". Some clips were removed from the final product because of their sexual content, although Buchanan admitted that she wanted it to be more suggestive.

The video features Range, Buchanan and Buena emerging from a lift onto separate floors of a tall building, the lift having been called by unsuspecting men. Range arrives on the floor of the first man (Emrhys Cooper), described by Buena as 'Mr Shy Guy', and the two begin flirting with each other. Buchanan opens the lift door to see, the second man, 'Mr Too Cool' and Buchanan is shown flirting and dancing with him. Buena emerges from the lift to find 'Mr Perfect', the third man. Buena takes his folded umbrella and throws it away, and soon begins flirting with him.

"There were a few short scenes when my shorts rode up too high and I have lots of young relations and young friends and I didn’t want them to think I was making a stripper video or a porn video so I had those bits cut out."

— Mutya Buena commenting on the video's sexual scenes.

Towards the end of the video, Range bends over 'Mr Shy Guy' in a seductive manner, Buchanan pushes 'Mr Too Cool' to the floor, and Buena gives 'Mr Perfect' a lap dance. The Sugababes are shown dancing in the lift throughout the video. Daily Mirror's Gavin Martin wrote that they "throw caution aside and present themselves as voracious maneaters" in the video. He compared Buchanan's dancing to that of American girl group Destiny's Child in the video for their single "Bootylicious". Madeline Crisp of the same publication described the Sugababes as having a "60s look". The video peaked at number one on the UK TV Airplay chart for two consecutive weeks. In Australia, the clip reached number three on Rage's top 50 video countdown.

== Live performances ==
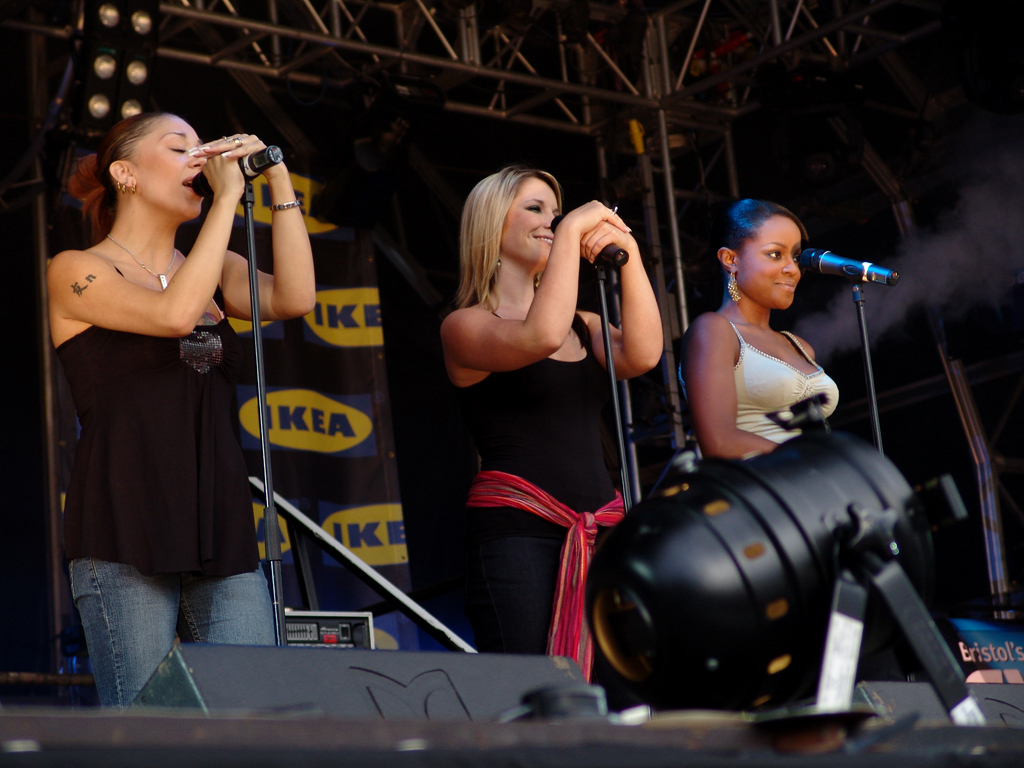
The Sugababes performed "Push the Button" at the Oxegen and V festivals.

The Sugababes travelled to Turin, Italy, in February 2006 and performed "Push the Button" for Top of the Pops at the Winter Olympics. The song was included in the set list of the group's 2006 tour in support of Taller in More Ways. The single was performed on 3 October 2006 at the 100 Club on Oxford Street, London, as part of the album launch for Overloaded: The Singles Collection. It was the gig's closing performance, and, according to a critic from MTV UK, "got everyone bopping to its bonkers, techno beat". The group performed "Push the Button" at London's G-A-Y nightclub in November 2006, wearing PVC clothing and rubber gear. The single appeared in the set list of the group's 2008 Change Tour. They performed the song on 1 June 2008 at Princes Street Gardens, Edinburgh as part of the Vodafone Live Music tour; David Pollock of The Scotsman suggested that it was one of the show's standouts.

The Sugababes performed "Push the Button" on 27 June 2008 in Hyde Park, London as part of Nelson Mandela's 90th birthday concert. They performed the single in July 2008 at the Oxegen Festival. A journalist from NME magazine wrote that it drew "one of the biggest crowds" at the event. A rock version was performed at the 2008 V Festival in Essex, England. The group played the song on 28 August 2008 at the Bridlington Spa as part of a gig, and at the 2008 Q Awards at The Forum, London, beginning with the synthesizer intro from "Won't Get Fooled Again" by British band The Who. "Push the Button" was one of the singles they performed at St Osyth's entertainment centre, The Venue, on 7 March 2009. The group performed it on 10 July 2009 at the Riverside Ground in County Durham, England, as part of a set list. Buchanan performed the song on 19 July 2011 at the Jacques Townhouse, as part of a set list that included the group's debut single "Overload", in addition to her solo tracks. Range and her dancing partner Andrei Lipanov skated to "Push the Button" during their appearance on the seventh series of Dancing on Ice.

== Recognition and popular culture ==
Andy Kellman of AllMusic described "Push the Button" as one of the most "clever and suggestive" pop singles of the 2000s, while Cameron Adams of the Herald Sun similarly highlighted it as one of the decade's best pop releases. In October 2008 Nick Levine of Digital Spy called the song one of the best pop singles of the 21st century. Buchanan named it among her favourites from the group's career, citing its representation of pop music "in a different light". "Push the Button" ranked 42nd on Stylus Magazine's list of 'Top 50 Singles of 2005', and 70th on The Daily Telegraph's list of '100 songs that defined the Noughties'. The song earned the Sugababes a BRIT Award nomination at the 2006 BRIT Awards for Best British Single, but lost to Coldplay's "Speed of Sound". It was one of the most played songs on British radio in 2005, and became the UK's 68th most popular song on radio of the 2000s.

"Push the Button" has been referenced several times in popular culture. The song was featured in a commercial for Tassimo coffee machines, which led to an increase in the product's sales, as well as airings of the commercial across Europe and in the United States. English band Starsailor performed a live cover version of the song as the B-side to their 2006 single "This Time". It was also covered by English hip hop duo Dan le sac vs Scroobius Pip, who performed it at the 2008 Bestival. Lynsey Haire of eFestivals wrote that the performance "went down especially well with the audience". "Push the Button" was included in the playlist for the opening ceremony of the London 2012 Summer Olympics. Firefighters in Staffordshire, England, performed a cover version, although the lyrics were modified to encourage the public to regularly test the smoke alarms in their homes. The video was promoted through YouTube, and was viewed more than 140,000 times. Peter Dartford, the chief fire officer for Staffordshire Fire and Rescue Service said:

We're continually trying new and innovative ways to get the message out there, about the importance of having smoke alarms and checking them on a regular basis, but a lot of people still aren't listening. Hopefully they will now after hearing this song and watching the video – you just can't help but listen to the words and laugh at the video.

== Track listings ==
- UK CD1 & European CD single / digital download
1. "Push the Button" – 3:38
2. "Favourite Song" – 3:46
- Digital EP & UK CD2 / European Maxi single
1. "Push the Button" – 3:38
2. "Like the Weather" – 3:45
3. "Push the Button" (DJ Prom Remix) – 8:14
4. "Push the Button" (video) – 3:37
- Digital single – acoustic version
1. "Push the Button" (Acoustic Version) – 3:25
- Digital single – Psycho Radio remix version
1. "Push the Button" (Psycho Radio Remix) – 8:04

== Credits and personnel ==
Credits are adapted from the liner notes of Taller in More Ways.

Recording

- Recorded at DARP Studios (Atlanta, Georgia) and Home Recordings (London, England)

Personnel

- Songwriting – Dallas Austin, Mutya Buena, Keisha Buchanan, Heidi Range
- Production – Dallas Austin
- Engineering – Rick Sheppard
- Recording engineering (assistant) – Graham Marsh, Ian Rossiter, Owen Clark
- Mixing – Jeremy Wheatley
- Mixing (assistant) – Richard Edgeler
- Drums – Dallas Austin
- Keys – Dallas Austin
- Guitar – Tony Reyes
- Bass guitar – Tony Reyes

== Charts ==
=== Weekly charts ===
Weekly chart performance for "Push the Button"
Chart (2005–2006)	Peak position
Australia (ARIA)	3
Austria (Ö3 Austria Top 40)	1
Belgium (Ultratop 50 Flanders)	2
Belgium (Ultratop 50 Wallonia)	33
Czech Republic Airplay (ČNS IFPI)	3
Denmark (Tracklisten)	3
European Hot 100 Singles (Billboard)	1
Finland (Suomen virallinen lista)	8
France (SNEP)	17
Germany (GfK)	2
Global Dance Songs (Billboard)	33
Greece (IFPI)	18
Hungary (Dance Top 40)	4
Hungary (Rádiós Top 40)	2
Hungary (Single Top 40)	9
Ireland (IRMA)	1
Italy (FIMI)	11
Netherlands (Dutch Top 40)	3
Netherlands (Single Top 100)	3
New Zealand (Recorded Music NZ)	1
Norway (VG-lista)	2
Romania (Romanian Top 100)	2
Scottish Singles Sales (Official Charts)	1
Slovakia Airplay (ČNS IFPI)	92
Sweden (Sverigetopplistan)	4
Switzerland (Schweizer Hitparade)	3
UK Singles (Official Charts)	1
UK Airplay (Music Week)	1

=== Year-end charts ===
2005 year-end chart performance for "Push the Button"
Chart (2005)	Position
Australia (ARIA)	71
Austria (Ö3 Austria Top 40)	5
Belgium (Ultratop 50 Flanders)	19
European Hot 100 Singles (Billboard)	10
Germany (Media Control GfK)	19
Hungary (Rádiós Top 40)	82
Ireland (IRMA)	10
Netherlands (Dutch Top 40)	7
Netherlands (Single Top 100)	8
New Zealand (RIANZ)	31
Romania (Romanian Top 100)	100
Russia Airplay (TopHit)	188
Sweden (Hitlistan)	21
Switzerland (Schweizer Hitparade)	37
UK Singles (OCC)	10
UK Airplay (Music Week)	13

2006 year-end chart performance for "Push the Button"
Chart (2006)	Position
Australia (ARIA)	45
Austria (Ö3 Austria Top 40)	56
European Hot 100 Singles (Billboard)	55
Germany (Media Control GfK)	37
Hungary (Dance Top 40)	34
Hungary (Rádiós Top 40)	4
Romania (Romanian Top 100)	60
Switzerland (Schweizer Hitparade)	58
UK Singles (OCC)	143
UK Airplay (Music Week)	25

=== Decade-end charts ===
2000s decade-end chart performance for "Push the Button"
Chart (2000–2009)	Position
Germany (Official German Charts)	86
Netherlands (Dutch Top 40)	50

== Certifications ==
Certifications and sales for "Push the Button"
Region	Certification	Certified units/sales
Australia (ARIA)	Platinum	70,000^{^}
Austria (IFPI Austria)	Gold	15,000^{*}
Denmark (IFPI Danmark)	Platinum	8,000^{^}
France	—	24,843
Germany (BVMI)	Gold	150,000^{^}
New Zealand (RMNZ)	2× Platinum	60,000^{‡}
Sweden (GLF)	Platinum	20,000^{^}
United Kingdom (BPI)	2× Platinum	1,200,000^{‡}
^{*} Sales figures based on certification alone.^{^} Shipments figures based on certification alone.^{‡} Sales+streaming figures based on certification alone.

== Release history ==
Release dates and formats for "Push the Button"
Region	Date	Format(s)	Label(s)	Ref.
Germany	23 September 2005	CD	Universal Music	
United Kingdom	26 September 2005	CD; digital download (EP); maxi CD	Island	
Germany	30 September 2005	Maxi CD	Universal Music	
Australia	17 October 2005	Maxi CD	Universal Music	
France	20 March 2006	CD	AZ	

== See also ==
- List of UK Singles Chart number ones of the 2000s
- List of number-one hits of 2005 (Austria)
- List of number-one singles from the 2000s (New Zealand)
- List of number-one singles of 2005 (Ireland)
