= Tony Clarke (singer) =

American singer-songwriter (1940–1971)

Background information
- Also known as: Tall Tonio
- Born: April 13, 1940; New York City, U.S.
- Died: August 28, 1971 (aged 31) Detroit, Michigan, U.S.
- Genres: Soul
- Occupations: Musician, singer, songwriter
- Instrument: Vocals
- Years active: 1959–1971
- Label: Chess

Tony Clarke (April 13, 1940 – August 28, 1971) was an American soul singer and songwriter. His most famous tracks include "The Entertainer" and "Landslide".

== Early life and career ==
Clarke, born in New York City, was raised in Detroit by his mother, Thelma. His birthname has often been cited as either "Ralph Thomas Williams", "Ralph Ferguson", or "Ralph Clarke". His father was of Sicilian background. He attended Northwestern High School in Detroit before getting married at the age of 16. He performed as a singer and made his first recordings for the small Stepp label in the late 1950s, his first single being "Ten Reasons" / "Hot-Rod-Car" in 1959 under the name "Tall Tonio". His next single, released three years later under the name Tony Clarke and released under the Fascination label, was "Cry" / "Love Must Be Taboo". He wrote the songs "Pushover" and "Two Sides to Every Story", hits for Etta James, with Billy Davis.

In 1963, Clarke wrote "Pushover" with Billy Davis for Etta James. Clarke moved to Chess Records in 1964. and had his first chart entry the same year with "(The Story of) Woman, Love and a Man", which reached No. 88 on the R&B chart. He had more success with his own song, "The Entertainer", which hit No. 10 R&B and No. 31 Pop in the U.S. in 1965. In 1966, he moved from Detroit to Hollywood, and secured a small part in the film They Call Me Mister Tibbs!. His last single released before his death, "Ghetto Man" / "Love Power", was released under Chicory records in 1970. This record was released on Chicory records. Clarke's 1968 record (They Call Me) A Wrong Man / I Can't Wait Until I See My Babys Face was backed by The Monticellos. Many of Clarke's records featured other famous Detroit rhythm and blue singers. His 1988 reissue of I Had A Talk With My Man / The Entertainer, featured Mitty Collier on I Had A Talk With My Man (the original release year is unknown). His first and only Extended play, reissued posthumously in 1990, featured Chris Kenner. By the late 1960s, Clarke's relationship with his wife became unstable. He was fatally shot by his estranged wife when he broke into her house in Detroit. It was said that Clarke tried to attack her with a tire jack. The shooting was ruled to have been self-defense.

== Legacy ==
After his death, his popularity saw a resurgence in the 1970s on the United Kingdom's Northern soul scene particularly with his recordings of “The Entertainer” and "Landslide". The Entertainer has been sampled twice: first in "N.I.C.E. Guy" by Scha Dara Parr in 1990, and next in "Aqui Para Frank V" by Proper Dos in 1992. A compilation album entitled "The Rare And The Rest" was posthumously released in 1997. Clarke's records are rare to come across in the modern day, and most of his records can sell for over $1,000. On October 4, 2015, Clarke was inducted into the National Rhythm & Blues Music Hall of Fame in Detroit, Michigan. The event was held at the Charles H. Wright Museum of African-American History.

== Discography ==
=== Albums ===
| Year | Title | Label |
|---|---|---|
| 1997 | The Rare And The Rest | Marginal |

=== Extended plays (EP) ===
| Year | Songs | Label |
|---|---|---|
| 1990 | Something You Got / This Heart Of Mine / Red Dress / Everyday I Have To Cry | Ripete |

=== Singles (Tall Tonio) ===
| Year | Name | Label |
|---|---|---|
| 1959 | Ten Reasons / Hot-Rod-Car | Stepp |

=== Singles (Tony Clarke) ===
| Year | Name | Label |
|---|---|---|
| 1962 | Cry / Love Must Be Taboo | Fascination |
| 1962 | (The Story Of) Woman, Love And A Man Part 1 / (The Story Of) Woman, Love And A Man Part 2 | Fascination |
| 1964 | Ain't Love Good - Ain't Love Proud / Coming Back Strong | Chess |
| 1965 | Joyce Elaine / You're A Star | Chess |
| 1965 | Landslide / You Made Me A V.I.P. (Very Important Person) | Chess |
| 1965 | The Entertainer / This Heart Of Mine | Chess |
| 1965 | Poor Boy / This Fugitive Kind | Chess |
| 1968 | (No Conception) No Sense Of Direction / (They Call Me) A Wrong Man | M-S |
| 1968 | (They Call Me) A Wrong Man / I Can't Wait Until I See My Babys Face | |
| 1969 | The Entertainer / Ain't Love Good - Ain't Love Proud | Chess |
| 1970 | Ghetto Man / Love Power | Chicory |

=== Singles (posthumous) ===
| Year | Name | Label |
|---|---|---|
| 1972 | The Entertainer / (The Story Of) Woman, Love And A Man | Chess |
| 1974 | Landslide / The Entertainer | Chess |
| 1988 | I Had A Talk With My Man / The Entertainer | |
| 1989 | Landslide / We're Gonna Make It | Ripete |
| 2013 | Love Must Be Taboo / Willie Knows How | Outta Sight |

=== Singles (release year unknown) ===
| Name | Label |
|---|---|
| Jeanette / Landslide | Chess |
| I Had A Talk With My Man / The Entertainer | Collectables |
| This Heart Of Mine / The Entertainer | Checker |
| The Entertainer / Got My Mojo Workin' | Ripete |
| The Entertainer / Selfish One | Eric |
