= Ugly (Sugababes song) =

2005 single by Sugababes

Single by Sugababes

from the album Taller in More Ways
- B-side: "Come Together"; "Future Shokk!"
- Released: 5 December 2005
- Recorded: DARP (Atlanta, Georgia); Home Recordings (London, England)
- Genre: Pop rock
- Length: 3:50
- Label: Island
- Songwriter: Dallas Austin
- Producer: Dallas Austin

Sugababes singles chronology
"Push the Button" (2005)	"Ugly" (2005)	"Red Dress" (2006)

Music video
- "Ugly" on YouTube

"Ugly" is a song by British girl group Sugababes from their fourth studio album, Taller in More Ways (2005). Written and produced by Dallas Austin, inspiration for the song was conceptualised in the midst of reading negative comments about members of the band. The song released on 5 December 2005 in the United Kingdom as the second single from the album. "Ugly" is a midtempo pop rock ballad that contains lyrics about personality and body-image issues. It received comparisons to "Unpretty" by girl group TLC and "Beautiful" by Christina Aguilera. "Ugly" is the band's final single released under the second line up of Sugababes, after original member Mutya Buena departed the group on 21 December 2005.

"Ugly" garnered positive reviews from music critics, many of whom praised the emotional and empowering concept behind it. The song peaked at number three on the UK Singles Chart. It achieved international commercial success, where it reached the top five in Denmark and New Zealand, and the top-ten the Czech Republic, Finland, Hungary, Ireland, the Netherlands and Norway. The song's accompanying music video is set in a warehouse in New York City, and features people of different ages and races showcasing their talents. The Sugababes have performed the song at the V Festival in both 2006 and 2008, and at the Indig02 in London, all of which received positive reviews from critics. "Ugly" has been used in schools within Wales to promote diversity and eliminate prejudice.

== Background and development ==
"Ugly" was written and produced by Dallas Austin for the Sugababes' fourth studio album, Taller in More Ways. Paul Sheehy, Doug Harms, Graham Marsh and Ian Rossiter served as the assistant recording engineers for the song. "Ugly" was mixed by Jeremy Wheatley for 365 Artists at TwentyOne Studio, London. Tony Reyes provided the accompanying guitar and bass guitar for the track, while the drums and keys were provided by Austin. "Ugly" was recorded at DARP Studios, at Atlanta & Home Recordings, London.

During an interview with Jess Cartner-Morley of The Guardian, the Sugababes revealed that Austin wrote the song after reading "the cuttings file he was sent about the band". Keisha Buchanan, one of the group's members, elaborated upon this: "All the rubbish and nasty stuff that's been written about us, calling us the Sugalumps, that sort of thing." The title of the song's parent album, Taller in More Ways, was inspired by a line in "Ugly", which reads: "I grew taller than them in more ways / But there'll always be one who will say / Something bad to make them feel great".

== Composition and theme ==
"Ugly"
A 27 second audio sample of the song, containing lyrics about body-image issues.

"Ugly" is a midtempo pop rock ballad that has a length of three minutes and fifty-three seconds. The song was composed in the key of C major using common time with a tempo of 117 beats per minute. The Sugababes' vocal range on the song span from the lower note of G_{3} to the higher note of E_{5}. Instrumentation consists of a guitar, bass guitar, drums and keys. Nick Southall of Stylus Magazine noted that the song incorporates acoustic guitars "buoyed by peripheral detail".

K. Ross Hoffman of Allmusic described "Ugly" as a "towering ballad" with romantic and body-image issues. The song received numerous comparisons to "Unpretty" by American girl group TLC, another track composed by Austin. Group member Heidi Range compared the song's lyrics to "Beautiful", a song performed by American recording artist Christina Aguilera. Harry Rubenstein of The Jerusalem Post also noted that the song is reminiscent of both "Unpretty" and "Beautiful". The lyrical content makes reference to feeling ugly from having different eyes and hair, in addition to being shorter than other people.

== Release and response ==
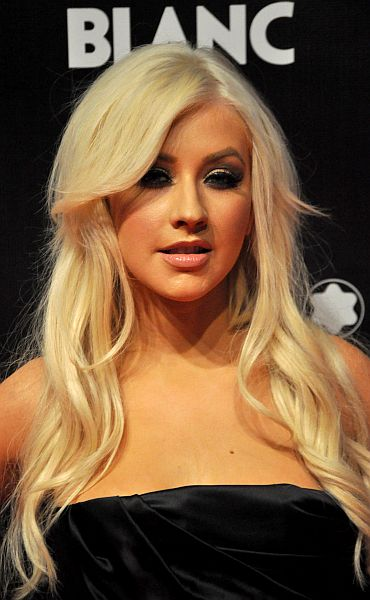
"Ugly" received comparisons to "Beautiful" by Christina Aguilera.

"Ugly" was released as a CD single in the United Kingdom on 5 December 2005, containing the radio edit of the song, and "Come Together". The extended play version of "Ugly" was released on the same day and contains the album version of the song, a B-side titled "Future Shokk!", a Desert Eagle Discs remix, and a Suga Shaker Vocal Mix. On 9 December 2005, "Ugly" was released as a CD single in Germany, which contains the same tracks on the extended play release, in addition to the single's music video. In Australia, Island Records released the song as a CD single on 16 January 2006.

"Ugly" garnered generally positive reviews from music critics. Phil Udell of Hot Press regarded it as a "classy, catchy pop tune with a human heart". Peter Robinson of The Observer felt that the track was one of the album's standouts, stating that it "immediately hits on the Sugababes' core values", which according to him are "cool, but so unswervingly radio-friendly that it would hardly be out of place as this year's Children in Need single". Talia Kraines of BBC described "Ugly" as a "ballad full of true Sugababes attitude". K. Ross Hoffman of AllMusic considered the track as an "aptly pitched inspirational mini-epic", and a writer for The Liverpool Daily Post & Echo characterised it as an "empowering anthem". Nick Southall of Stylus Magazine called it "vastly superior self-help pop" and "lovingly produced". However, Ben Hogwood of musicOMH thought the song was unconvincing, while Alex Roginski of Sydney Morning Herald criticized the songwriting as "flat".

== Chart performance ==
"Ugly" entered the UK Singles Chart at number three on 11 December 2005 ― for the week ending dated 17 December 2005 ― with sales of 21,107, becoming the Sugababes' second consecutive top-three single and their tenth top ten hit overall. The song spent four weeks in the chart's top-ten and 20 weeks on the chart overall. "Ugly" had sold 170,000 copies in the UK and ranks as the group's seventh best-selling single in the country as of 2010, and has since been certified silver for sales of over 200,000 units. "Ugly" debuted and peaked at number seven on the Irish Singles Chart, becoming the Sugababes' sixth top ten single in Ireland. The song peaked at number four in Denmark, becoming the Sugababes' fourth top-five single in the country. "Ugly" also reached number seven in Hungary and the Netherlands, earning the Sugababes their fourth top ten hit in the former and their seventh one in the latter respectively.

"Ugly" also became a commercial success in many other European countries. The single number eight in the Czech Republic and Finland, and number nine in Norway. In Belgium, the song reached numbers eight and 13 on the Wallonia Ultratip and Flanders Ultratop charts, respectively. "Ugly" attained top-twenty positions in Austria, Sweden and Switzerland; it charted at number 26 in Germany and number 68 in Slovakia. "Ugly" also achieved success outside of Europe. In New Zealand, it entered the chart at number seven and peaked at number five two weeks later, becoming the Sugababes' second consecutive top-five single in the country and their fourth one overall. It remained in the chart for 16 weeks. In Australia, "Ugly" debuted at number 16 and peaked at number 13 on its fourth week on the chart, becoming their second-best performing single in the country.

== Music video ==
The accompanying music video for "Ugly" was directed by Toby Tremlett and filmed on 1 November 2005. It is set in a warehouse in New York City that is used for people who are taking part in an audition. It begins with a yellow taxi driving on a New York City road with apartment complexes. As the song begins, Buena sings her verse while looking into a mirror, and other people in the warehouse begin to hold up signs of the song's lyrics. During the chorus, they begin to showcase their talents such as dancing and juggling. Buchanan's verse features her sitting on a staircase; during this part, a child holds up a sign reading "short" while a woman carries a sign saying "loneliness". As Range sings the bridge, she is leaning on a wall in the warehouse while more people begin dancing. When Sugababes sing the chorus again, they dance with the people who also begin to show other talents, including instrumentation and magic tricks. As the video ends, a row of people hold up signs containing one word from the song's lyrics, "people are all the same", and then another message "don't be afraid to be you", with Buchanan, Buena and Range holding each letter of the last word.

The version of the song used for the video is slightly different than both the album version and the radio edit; it cuts the chorus between Buchanan's verse and Range's bridge in half like the radio edit; but retains the longer intro and fade-out outro from the album version, albeit with an additional ad-lib from Buena as the final chorus fades out part-way through.

== Live performances and school usage ==
Sugababes performed "Ugly" at the V Festival in 2006 as part of a set list, which included "Hole in the Head", "Red Dress" and "Push the Button". In 2008, they performed the song at the same event in the JJB Champion Arena, as part of a set list which included Push the Button and About You Now. The performance received positive reviews, with a reviewer from MTV UK calling it "a highlight of our festival in the JJB Arena". In August 2007, former group member Mutya Buena, who left the band shortly following the single's release, performed the song at the V Festival in Chelmsford. On 18 September 2007, Sugababes performed an acoustic version of "Ugly" at the Indig02 as part of a set list, which included such songs as "Freak Like Me", "Round Round", "In the Middle", "Red Dress" and "Too Lost In You". Nick Levine of Digital Spy felt the performance "proves that no member's a slacker in the trilling department".

In March 2006, it was announced by The Commission for Racial Equality Croeso initiative that the Sugababes would take part in supporting diversity and opposing injustice in Wales. The group allowed all schools located in Wales to use "Ugly" as part of an assembly, in which the schools can use the same resources provided by the Croeso initiative.

== Track listings and formats ==
- UK CD1 / European CD Single
1. "Ugly" (Radio Edit) - 3:02
2. "Come Together" - 3:52
- UK CD2 / International Maxi CD
1. "Ugly" (Album Version) - 3:50
2. "Future Shokk!" - 4:05
3. "Ugly" (The Desert Eagle Discs Remix) - 4:13
4. "Ugly" (Suga Shaker Vocal Mix) - 5:42
5. "Ugly" (Enhanced Video) - 3:50

== Personnel ==
- Songwriting – Dallas Austin
- Production – Dallas Austin
- Mixing – Jeremy Wheatley, Richard Edgeler
- Engineering – Rick Sheppard
- Engineering (assistant recording) – Doug Harms, Graham Marsh (producer), Ian Rossiter, Paul Sheehy Guitar
- Instruments – Dallas Austin, Tony Reyes

== Charts ==
=== Weekly charts ===
Weekly chart performance for "Ugly"
Chart (2005–2006)	Peak position
Australia (ARIA)	13
Austria (Ö3 Austria Top 40)	14
Belgium (Ultratip Bubbling Under Wallonia)	8
Belgium (Ultratop 50 Flanders)	13
Czech Republic Airplay (ČNS IFPI)	8
Denmark (Tracklisten)	4
Denmark Airplay (Tracklisten)	3
European Hot 100 Singles (Billboard)	11
Finland (Suomen virallinen lista)	8
Germany (GfK)	26
Greece (IFPI)	38
Hungary (Rádiós Top 40)	7
Hungary (Dance Top 40)	14
Ireland (IRMA)	7
Netherlands (Dutch Top 40)	7
Netherlands (Single Top 100)	13
New Zealand (Recorded Music NZ)	5
Norway (VG-lista)	9
Scottish Singles Sales (Official Charts)	4
Slovakia Airplay (ČNS IFPI)	68
Sweden (Sverigetopplistan)	18
Switzerland (Schweizer Hitparade)	19
UK Singles (Official Charts)	3
UK Airplay (Music Week)	1
Ukraine Airplay (TopHit)	136
Ukraine Airplay (TopHit) Suga Shaker vocal mix	167

=== Year-end charts ===
2005 year-end chart performance for "Ugly"
Chart (2005)	Position
UK Singles (OCC)	72

2006 year-end chart performance for "Ugly"
Chart (2006)	Position
Australia (ARIA)	88
Belgium (Ultratop 50 Flanders)	90
European Hot 100 Singles (Billboard)	82
Hungary (Rádiós Top 40)	48
Netherlands (Dutch Top 40)	65
UK Airplay (Music Week)	45

== Certifications ==
Certifications and sales for "Ugly"
Region	Certification	Certified units/sales
United Kingdom (BPI)	Silver	200,000^{‡}
^{‡} Sales+streaming figures based on certification alone.

== Release history ==
Release dates and formats for "Ugly"
Region	Date	Format(s)	Label(s)	Ref.
United Kingdom	5 December 2005	CD; digital download (EP); maxi CD	Island	
Germany	9 December 2005	Maxi CD	Universal Music	
Germany	16 December 2005	CD	Universal Music	
Australia	16 January 2006	Maxi CD	Universal Music	
