= Run for Cover (Sugababes song) =

2001 Sugababes song

Single by Sugababes

from the album One Touch
- B-side: "Don't Wanna Wait"
- Released: 9 April 2001
- Studio: Bear (London)
- Genre: Pop
- Length: 3:47
- Label: London
- Songwriters: Jony Lipsey; Cameron McVey; Paul Simm; Siobhán Donaghy; Mutya Buena; Keisha Buchanan
- Producers: Cameron McVey; Jony Rockstar; Paul Simm

Sugababes singles chronology
"New Year" (2000)	"Run for Cover" (2001)	"Soul Sound" (2001)

Music video
- "Run for Cover" on YouTube

Professional ratings
Review scores
Source	Rating
NME	4/5 stars

"Run for Cover" is a song by British girl group Sugababes. Group members Siobhan Donaghy, Keisha Buchanan, and Mutya Buena wrote the song with Jony Lipsey, Cameron McVey, and Paul Simm for the band's debut album, One Touch (2000). It was released as the album's third single on 9 April 2001 and reached the top 30 in Germany and the top 20 on the UK Singles Chart.

== Song information ==
The song was produced by Lipsey, McVey and Simm. It received strong reviews from music critics. The track was described as one of the group's darkest and most haunting singles to date at the time of the album's release. The lyrics describe escaping from the reality and harshness of the world, possibly an abusive relationship (you never seem to wonder/how much you make me suffer). It was released as the third single from the group's debut album,` One Touch in April 2001 and sold 64,242 copies. It charted at number 13 on the UK Singles Chart.

== Music video ==
The music video was directed by Jamie Morgan (musician) and features the Sugababes on a night out in London across a number of different locations one of which was Westbourne Grove and another being Ladbroke Grove inbetween shots inside the back of a car and ends with a fade to black cut.

== Live performances ==
At its peak charting at number 13 in the singles chart, they performed it on Top of the Pops in 2001.

== Legacy ==
=== One Touch 20th Anniversary Edition ===
On 11 May 2021, the Sugababes released a reworking of "Run for Cover" featuring singer MNEK.

== Track listings ==
UK CD single
No.	Title	Writer(s)	Producer(s)	Length
1.	"Run for Cover"	Cameron McVey; Paul Simm; Jonathan Lipsey; Keisha Buchanan; Mutya Buena; Siobhán Donaghy	McVey; Jony Rockstar; Simm	3:47
2.	"Don't Wanna Wait"	Ron Tom; Donald McLean	Tom; Don-E	4:42
3.	"Run for Cover" (Zero Gravity Suga and Spice mix)	McVey; Simm; Lipsey; Buchanan; Buena; Donaghy	McVey; Rockstar; Simm; Zero Gravity^{[a]}	5:51

UK cassette single and European CD single
No.	Title	Writer(s)	Producer(s)	Length
1.	"Run for Cover"	McVey; Simm; Lipsey; Buchanan; Buena; Donaghy	McVey; Rockstar; Simm	3:47
2.	"Don't Wanna Wait"	Tom; McLean	Tom; Don-E	4:42

UK DVD single
No.	Title	Writer(s)	Producer(s)	Length
1.	"Run for Cover" (full video)	McVey; Simm; Lipsey; Buchanan; Buena; Donaghy	McVey; Rockstar; Simm
2.	"Overload" (Nick Faber mix audio track)	Buchanan; Buena; Donaghy; McVey; Rockstar; Felix Howard; Simm	McVey; Rockstar; Simm; Nick Faber^{[a]}
3.	"Extracts from the videos of 'Overload' and 'New Year'"

Australian CD single
No.	Title	Writer(s)	Producer(s)	Length
1.	"Run for Cover"	McVey; Simm; Lipsey; Buchanan; Buena; Donaghy	McVey; Rockstar; Simm	3:47
2.	"Run for Cover" (J-Walk remix)	McVey; Simm; Lipsey; Buchanan; Buena; Donaghy	McVey; Rockstar; Simm; J-Walk^{[a]}	4:44
3.	"Run for Cover" (Zero Gravity Suga and Spice mix)	McVey; Simm; Lipsey; Buchanan; Buena; Donaghy	McVey; Rockstar; Simm; Zero Gravity^{[a]}	5:51
4.	"Don't Wanna Wait"	Tom; McLean	Tom; Don-E	4:42

Notes

- ^{^a} denotes additional producer(s)

== Charts ==
=== Weekly charts ===
Chart (2001)	Peak position
Australia (ARIA)	36
Australian Urban (ARIA)	17
Austria (Ö3 Austria Top 40)	38
Europe (Eurochart Hot 100)	37
Germany (GfK)	28
Ireland (IRMA)	35
Netherlands (Dutch Top 40)	33
Netherlands (Single Top 100)	49
New Zealand (Recorded Music NZ)	49
Scotland Singles (OCC)	17
Switzerland (Schweizer Hitparade)	36
UK Singles (OCC)	13
UK Airplay (Music Week)	17

=== Year-end charts ===
Chart (2001)	Position
UK Singles (OCC)	196

== Release history ==
Region	Version	Date	Format(s)	Label(s)	Ref.
United Kingdom	Original	9 April 2001	CD; cassette; DVD	London	
Australia	Original	18 June 2001	CD	London	
Australia	Original	3 September 2001	DVD	London	
United Kingdom	Remaster	11 May 2021	Digital download	London	
