= Soul Sound =

Single by Sugababes

from the album One Touch
- Released: 16 July 2001
- Studio: Matrix Recording Studios; (London, UK)
- Genre: Pop rock; R&B
- Length: 4:30 (album version); 3:53 (radio edit)
- Label: London
- Songwriter: Charlotte Edwards
- Producer: Ron Tom

Sugababes singles chronology
| "Run for Cover" (2001) | "Soul Sound" (2001) | "Freak like Me" (2002) |

Music video
- "Soul Sound" on YouTube

"Soul Sound" is a song by British girl group Sugababes from their debut studio album One Touch (2000). It was written by Charlotte Gordon Cumming during a trip to Kenya, Africa, where she was inspired to compose it based on her experiences there. Produced by Ron Tom, "Soul Sound" is a pop song featuring guitar and bass instrumentation. It was released in the United Kingdom on 16 July 2001 as the album's fourth and final single. Critics praised the song for the group's demeanour although some regarded it as inferior in comparison to the album's other tracks.

To promote the song, a music video was directed by Max & Dania; it features the Sugababes in an apartment where their souls are released by the music. The trio performed "Soul Sound" at Manchester Ampersand and at the London Notre Dame Hall. The song became the group's lowest-charting single at the time, peaking at number thirty on the UK Singles Chart, and remains one of their lowest-selling singles to date. It was the final single that they released through London Records. It was also their last single to feature original member Siobhán Donaghy, who left the group shortly after the song's release, until the original group members reformed as Mutya Keisha Siobhan (later regaining the Sugababes name) in 2011.

== Background and composition ==
"I hung out with the girls for a year while they recorded their album. I was shocked by how young they were. But they were lovely and it was really interesting for me to watch them grow and develop as artists. I am so pleased and proud to be able to say I was a part of that. Ideally that's what I want to be able to do. I like performing but what would please me more is just to write songs and see other people covering them."

— Charlotte Gordon Cumming.

"Soul Sound" was written by the Scottish musician Charlotte Gordon Cumming during her trip to Kenya. Her inspiration to write the song stemmed from Africa, a continent which she visited frequently with her family as a child. According to Cumming, "In Africa I feel extremely alive, but also very small. The song was the essence of how I felt: seeing the beauty and horror of a place, and going into a heightened state." She elaborated, "My songs are all about who I am and what I am feeling, which is why they can take so much out of me to perform—and I always feel a lot when I go to Africa".

Cumming had spent a year with the Sugababes while they recorded their debut studio album One Touch (2000); according to the Daily Record, the trio's management were desperate for them to sing "Soul Sound". The song was produced by Ron Tom, who mixed and programmed it in collaboration with Mark Frank. Individuals who provide backing vocals on the song include Xavier Barnet and the Kenyan-born British singer Lamya. "Soul Sound" was recorded at the Matrix Recording Studios in London, England.

"Soul Sound" is a pop record that experiments with pop-rock balladry. The song features guitar and bass instrumentation. John Mulvey of NME characteristed the song as having "tasteful slippery beats, tasteful acoustic guitars, [and] the usual indolent harmonies". The song's lyrics immediately begin with a sense of decision through the line "I Touch the sky", and largely focus on the enjoyment of life.

== Reception ==
=== Critical ===
"Soul Sound" received mixed to positive reviews from critics. The Sunday Mirror's Ian Hyland rated the song nine out of ten stars and described it as "[p]ure class from the ever-smiling teens". According to AllMusic's Dean Carlson, "Soul Sound" is a representation that "the jitters of youth are [on One Touch] though tempered by shrewd ambition and a clever and unpredictable production aesthetic". John Mulvey of NME stated that while the song lacked the quality of the trio's debut single "Overload", it "is pretty good nevertheless". He elaborated, "the best thing about Sugababes is how they sound like they really can't be arsed with anything, let alone any of this pop star business [...] Enough with the dance routines and shit-eating grins—does this mean total lack of enthusiasm's the way forward for teen pop?" Stylus Magazine writer Scott Plagenhoef described the single as "marvelous lilting [and] hopeful", while Stephen Robinson from Hot Press was less favourable and criticised the song's pop-rock experimentation, which according to him "doesn't work quite so well". Neil Western of the South China Morning Post felt that "Soul Sound", along with the album's title track, "lack sparkle".

=== Commercial ===
The song was released in the United Kingdom on 16 July 2001 as the fourth and final single from One Touch. Upon release, it debuted and peaked at number thirty on the UK Singles Chart, the group's lowest-charting single in the United Kingdom at the time. In the UK, "Soul Sound" is one of the group's lowest-selling singles to date. Unlike the previous singles from One Touch, "Soul Sound" failed to make an impact on the Irish Singles Chart. The song earned the Sugababes a 2001 MTV Awards nomination for Best European Single.

== Promotion ==
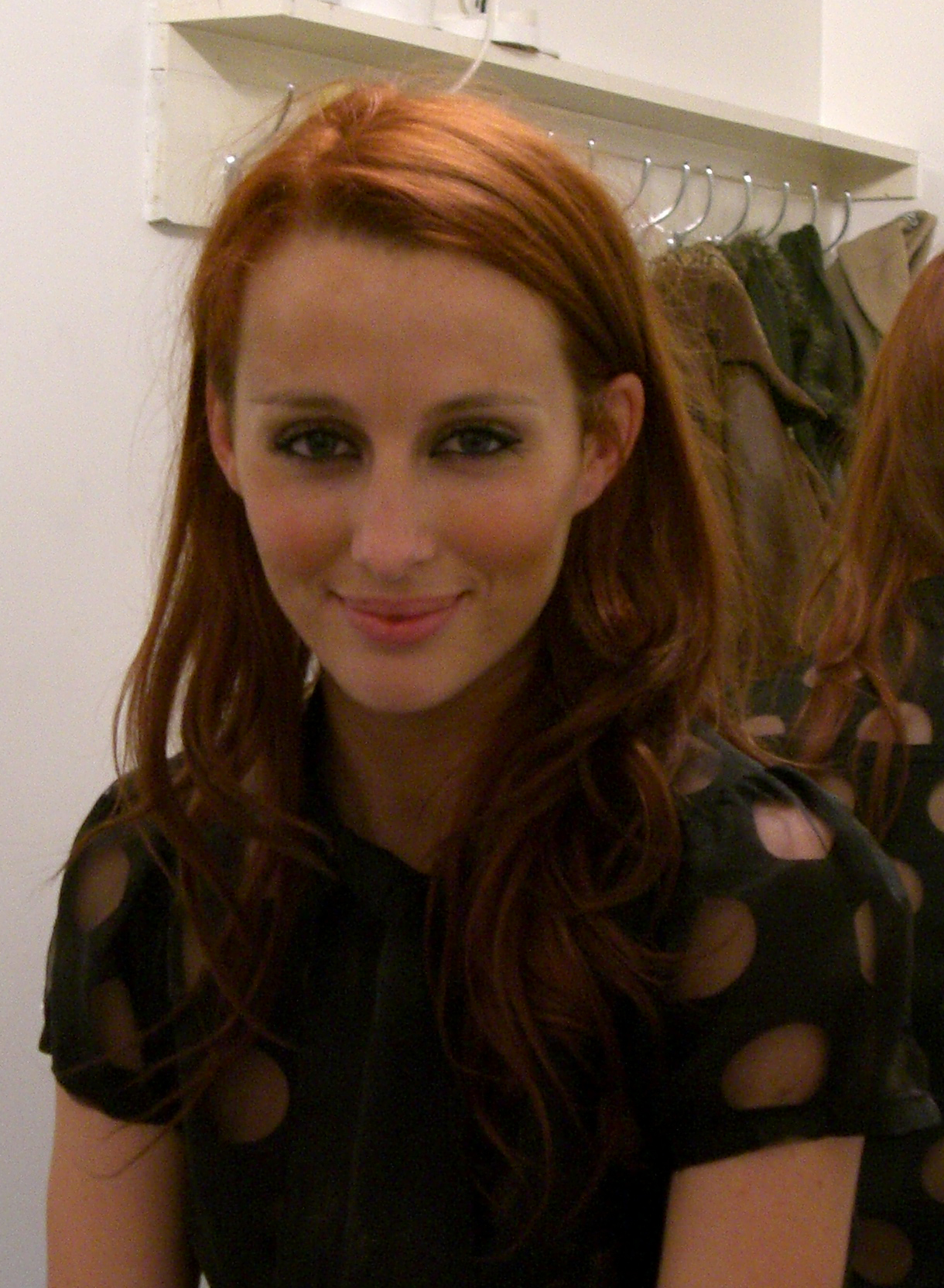
Shortly following the release of "Soul Sound", Donaghy left the group, which was later dropped by London Records.

=== Music video ===
The accompanying music video for "Soul Sound" was directed by Max & Dania and filmed in London. Band member Siobhán Donaghy stated that around the time of the video's filming, her and the other group members were not performing as a group frequently: "It's been fairly quiet recently, but it usually is between singles. The other two have been doing their exams, and I have been doing some interviews for newspapers and magazines abroad. Apart from the video for 'Soul Sound' we have not been doing too much together." During the video, the group's members are featured in an apartment and are seated on couches and chairs. The plot involves their inner souls being released by the music, while outside in the neighbourhood the music takes control of other people's lives and causes their souls to be lifted too. The video was included on the CD release of "Soul Sound".

In a 2020 interview on Clara Amfo's "This City" podcast, Keisha Buchanan recalled that during the filming of the video, the group had their first true "music industry" moment, where she felt the record label executives were trying to mould the group into something it was not. "We were told, you've got to smile, you've got to be more smiley [in this video]. When I look at that moment, that was the start of trying to be controlled. Whereas, up until that point, we were... just being ourselves. I remember them saying, you guys need to be more approachable. The more voices that were coming in, the more it was about needing to smile more." Donaghy chimed in: "I didn't love the Soul Sound video, probably for that very reason."

=== Live performances ===
The Sugababes played "Soul Sound" on 27 March 2001 at Manchester Ampersand, in conjunction with many of the album's tracks such as "Overload" and "Run for Cover". This was their second-ever live performance, which was sponsored by NME. Donaghy commented,

We were very lucky that the tour was done in conjunction with NME, and it meant that we were playing to an older audience. We never set out to appeal to under-10s, because of the kind of stuff we listened to ourselves. If we manage to incorporate even a hint of that in our own music, we should appeal to quite an adult audience. We were all very nervous at all the gigs, but that was just because we were so worried about it going well.

According to Kitty Empire of NME, during the performance, "'Soul Sound' [grew] lovelier with every croon of its chorus". Later that month, the trio performed the song at London's Notre Dame Hall as part of a set list. The Guardian's John Aizlewood commented that during its performance, the group "[created] a tidal wave of melody".

== Impact ==
The group's members were dissatisfied with the release of "Soul Sound" as a single, because they wanted to venture into an R&B sound whereas their record label London Records pushed them into a more pop direction. Soon after the song's release, Donaghy left the group and was replaced by former Atomic Kitten member Heidi Range, making it the last Sugababes single to feature her vocals. Further, the sales of One Touch and its last three singles, "New Year", "Run for Cover" and "Soul Sound", failed to meet the expectations of London Records and the group was subsequently dropped. Buchanan has stated that the song's release and subsequent commercial underperformance was a positive experience because, saying: "Everything happens for a reason and it looks like it has all worked out". "Soul Sound" was featured in the 2001 film Summer Catch, which stars such actors as Freddie Prinze Jr. and Jessica Biel.

== Track listings ==
CD1 single
| No. | Title | Writer(s) | Producer(s) | Length |
|---|---|---|---|---|
| 1. | "Soul Sound" | Charlotte Edwards; Sam Harley | Ron Tom | 3:53 |
| 2. | "Run for Cover" (Acoustic Radio One Session) | Cameron McVey; Paul Simm; Jonathan Lipsey; Keisha Buchanan; Mutya Buena; Siobhán Donaghy | John Pearson | 3:34 |
| 3. | "Soul Sound" (Acoustic Radio One Session) | Edwards; Harley | Pearson | 4:35 |
| 4. | "Soul Sound" (Video) |

CD2 single
| No. | Title | Writer(s) | Producer(s) | Length |
|---|---|---|---|---|
| 1. | "Soul Sound" (Soulchild Remix) | Edwards; Harley | Tom; Damien Mendis^{[a]}; Stuart Bradbury^{[a]} | 5:00 |
| 2. | "Soul Sound" (Medway City Heights Mix) | Edwards; Harley | Tom; Medway City Heights^{[a]} | 7:29 |
| 3. | "Soul Sound" (Joey Negro Club Mix) | Edwards; Harley | Tom; Dave Lee^{[a]} | 7:02 |

Cassette single
| No. | Title | Writer(s) | Producer(s) | Length |
|---|---|---|---|---|
| 1. | "Soul Sound" (Soulchild Remix) | Edwards; Harley | Tom; Mendis^{[a]}; Bradbury^{[a]} | 5:00 |
| 2. | "Soul Sound" (Medway City Heights Mix) | Edwards; Harley | Tom; Medway City Heights^{[a]} | 7:29 |

Notes

- ^{^a} denotes additional producer(s)

== Credits and personnel ==
Recording

- Recorded at Matrix Recording Studios, London, England

Personnel

- Songwriting – Charlotte Edwards
- Production – Ron Tom
- Mixing – Mark Frank, Ron Tom
- Guitar – Andrew Smith
- Lead guitar – Ron Tom
- Bass – Pino Palladino
- Backing vocals – Lamya, Xavier Barnet
- Programming – Ron Tom
- Additional programming – Mark Frank

Credits are taken from the liner notes of One Touch, courtesy of London Records.

== Charts ==
| Chart (2001) | Peak position |
|---|---|
| UK Singles (Official Charts Company) | 30 |
