= One Touch (Sugababes album) =

2000 studio album by Sugababes

Studio album by Sugababes
- Released: 27 November 2000
- Recorded: 2000
- Studios: Bear Studios, Eastcote Studios, EMI Studios, Matrix Studios, Mayfair Studios (London)
- Genres: Pop; soul; R&B
- Length: 48:20
- Label: London
- Producers: Don-E; Carl McIntosh; Cameron McVey; Jony Rockstar; Matt Rowe; Paul Simm; Luke Smith; Ron Tom; Paul Watson

Sugababes chronology
One Touch (2000)	Angels with Dirty Faces (2002)

Singles from One Touch
- 1. "Overload" Released: 11 September 2000; 2. "New Year" Released: 18 December 2000; 3. "Run for Cover" Released: 9 April 2001; 4. "Soul Sound" Released: 16 July 2001

One Touch is the debut studio album by British girl group Sugababes. It was released by London Records in the UK on 27 November 2000, and the following month in most other European territories. Recorded while members Mutya Buena, Keisha Buchanan, and Siobhán Donaghy were still in school, the album's sound was heavily shaped by Cameron McVey, who encouraged the group's songwriting and creative involvement. McVey handled the majority of the production alongside Jony Rockstar and Paul Simm, with additional contributions from Ron Tom, Carl McIntosh, Don-E, and others.

The album received strong critical acclaim, with reviewers praising the young Sugababes members for their mature songwriting, vocals, and blend of R&B, pop, and soul influences. Commercially, One Touch had a slow start in the United Kingdom but later peaked at number 26 and earned a Gold certification from the British Phonographic Industry (BPI). It also achieved top ten success in German-speaking Europe and reached the top 20 in New Zealand, but sales still fell below London Records' expectations, resulting in the termination of the group's recording deal in late 2001.

One Touch produced four singles, including "Overload", "New Year", "Run for Cover", and "Soul Sound," with "Overload" becoming a major hit all over Europe and earning the band a Brit Award nomination. Following the release of "Soul Sound," Donaghy left Sugababes and was replaced by Heidi Range, who appeared on the group's later releases. In 2021, having previously reunited as Sugababes before, Buena, Buchanan, and Donaghy released a special 20th anniversary edition of One Touch, which went on to reach a new peak of number 18 on the UK Albums Chart.

== Background ==
Sugababes were established in 1998 by Ron Tom, who also managed All Saints, alongside Sarah Stennett and First Access Entertainment. At the time, Mutya Buena and Siobhán Donaghy, aged just 12 and 13 respectively, were attending the same primary school and had each been signed as solo artists to Tom. However, after performing at the same industry showcase, they chose to collaborate. During a studio session, Buena brought along her close friend Keisha Buchanan, and the trio quickly took shape. Tom saw potential in their diverse looks and likened them to the United Colors of Benetton, deciding they should form a group. Initially called the Sugababies, their name was soon changed to Sugababes upon signing with London Records, aiming to present a more grown-up image.

Production of their debut album took place while Buchanan, Buena, and Donaghy were still at school. Typically, the group members would leave school around midday to attend studio sessions that often lasted until late afternoon, after which they would return home briefly to change into their school uniforms before heading back to school for the following day. Recording sessions were sometimes conducted concurrently, with the group alternating between two studio rooms to work on different songs. Although London Records introduced them to a range of producers, it was Cameron McVey who significantly influenced the album’s tone and creative identity and encouraged the group to begin writing their own lyrics. He also encouraged the members to begin writing their own lyrics by initially providing them with a backing track and instructing them to write freely over it. This approach sparked their interest in contributing creatively during songwriting sessions. Their early writing process was largely stream-of-consciousness, drawing on personal themes such as daily experiences, relationships, and emotions. McVey would later refine and structure their ideas into cohesive lyrics. This collaborative method ultimately led to the group receiving co-writing credits on nearly every track of the album.

== Promotion ==
The album was promoted through four singles released between 2000 and 2001, with the release order varying between the United Kingdom and other international markets. The lead single, "Overload," was released in September 2000 and became the band's breakthrough release. The song achieved significant commercial success, peaking at number 6 on the UK Singles Chart and reaching the top 30 in several other markets, including Australia, Austria, Ireland, the Netherlands, New Zealand, and Switzerland. It received a Silver certification from the British Phonographic Industry (BPI) and a Gold certification from the Bundesverband Musikindustrie (BVMI) in Germany.

In the United Kingdom and Ireland, the second single released from the album was "New Year" in fall 2000. The song peaked at number 12 in Scotland and the United Kingdom, while also reaching number 25 on the Irish Singles Chart, but was not issued as a single in other territories. For international markets outside the UK and Ireland, "Run for Cover" served as One Touch's second single. released in 2001, the track achieved broader international chart success, reaching number 13 on the UK Singles Chart and charting in Australia, Austria, Germany, Ireland, the Netherlands, New Zealand, and Switzerland. Fourth and final single, "Soul Sound," did not achieve significant chart positions in the listed territories but reached the top 30 in the United Kingdom.

== Critical reception ==
Professional ratings
Review scores
Source	Rating
AllMusic	3.5/5 stars
Drowned in Sound	4/5 stars
Entertainment Ireland	4/5 stars
The Guardian	4/5 stars
The Independent	4/5 stars
New York Post	2.5/4 stars
Pitchfork	7.3/10
The Sunday Herald	4/5 stars
Sunday Mirror	9/10
Yahoo! Music	9/10

The album received rave reviews, with critics applauding the girls, who were all only 15/16 years old at the time, for writing and singing songs that were considered to be unusually mature for their age. Betty Clarke from The Guardian called One Touch a "fantastic album that encapsulates the sound of young America with enough style, attitude and originality to mesmerise." Tim Perry from The Independent wrote that "it's about time a half-decent pure-pop album got released, and over a dozen songs that jump playfully between upbeat R&B, poppy soul and groove-laden ballads, these three London schoolgirls have achieved it. What's more, they can actually sing. Listen and weep, Spice Girls: this is the future." Similarly Sunday Mirror's Ian Hyland commented on the album: "All Saints can go off and have their babies. The future of funky British R'n'B is safe." David Brinn from Jerusalem Post noted that "the Sugababes are the latest contender for the girl-group throne, and the London teen trio's opening shot, One Touch, proves that they're one step ahead of the pack."

Andy Strickland, writing for Yahoo! Music called One Touch "just magnificent. Sugababes sing like angels – angels who've earned their wings listening to TLC and SWV not the Spice Girls." He concluded, "at the risk of giving them the musical equivalent of shin-splints by putting them in the first team too early, this record announces the arrival of potentially one of the most important new groups for many years." Dean Carlson from AllMusic praised the album, awarding it three and a half out of five stars and describing it as "everything a post-Spice Girls teen pop debut should be—discreet, adolescent, and as unstudied as a late-night phone call about boys." Entertainment Ireland found that "although the Sugababes name makes them sound like another slice of pop fluff, these new kids on the R'n'B block are actually much more interesting than that. Their [...] debut album shows a maturity and musical proficiency that many of their peers might envy. Their blend of cool, laid-back soul is distinguished by mature vocals, accomplished arrangements and oblique lyrics." Drowned in Sound editor James Kimmitt wrote that One Touch "smelled of authenticity" and praised the Sugababes for "remarkably mature and sophisticated songs" that made it "the finest collection of pop-songs released this year by a new artist."

== Commercial performance ==
Released on 27 November 2000 in the United Kingdom, One Touch debuted at number 77 on the UK Albums Chart, selling 5,510 copies. After several weeks of fluctuating chart positions, it made its final chart appearance of its initial run on 17 February 2001 at number 76. The album re-entered the chart two months later at number 71 and eventually reached its peak position of number 26 two weeks afterwards. One Touch reached Silver status in the United Kingdom on 8 December 2000 and was certified Gold by the British Phonographic Industry (BPI) on 19 January 2001, denoting shipments of 100,000 copies of the album. By October 2007, UK sales were estimated at approximately 220,000 copies, rising to 226,000 chart sales by September 2021. On 8 October 2021, One Touch re-entered the UK Albums Chart at number 18 following its 20th anniversary reissue, marking a new peak. The same week, it also entered the top 10 of the Scottish Albums Chart for the first time, peaking at number nine.

Elsewhere, One Touch debuted at number nine on the Austrian Albums Chart and rose to a peak of number six the following week, holding that position for two consecutive weeks. It remained on the chart for a total of 16 weeks. In Germany, the album reached number seven on the German Albums Chart and spent 19 weeks on the chart overall. In Switzerland, One Touch peaked at number eight on the Swiss Albums Chart, a position it held for two weeks, and charted for 17 weeks in total. In Australia, the album debuted at number 86 on 6 August 2001 before re-entering at number 63 two weeks later, which ultimately became its peak position. It performed more strongly in New Zealand, where it entered the chart at number 31 on 19 August 2001 and climbed to number 16 the following week. One Touch also peaked at number 55 on the Irish Albums Chart.

== Impact ==
Despite achieving moderate commercial success, reaching Gold status in the United Kingdom and faring even better in German-speaking Europe, One Touch initially fell short of the commercial expectations set by London Records, the group's record label. Sales were regarded as disappointing by label executives, and the group was subsequently dropped from London Records in autumn 2001, making One Touch their only release under the imprint. Before the record deal had officially concluded, Siobhán Donaghy departed from the group during a promotional tour of Japan and was replaced by former Atomic Kitten member Heidi Range. At the time, Donaghy stated that she wished to pursue a career in fashion, although she later revealed that she had been suffering from clinical depression during this period. Reports also suggested that internal tensions within the group contributed to her departure. Her exit marked the end of the group's original line-up, making One Touch the only album featuring the original members until Donaghy's reunion with Buchanan and Buena in 2011, followed by the release of The Lost Tapes in 2022.

In later years, One Touch gained recognition as an influential release within the group's catalogue. In a 2009 interview, Mutya Buena described the album as the group’s best work and stated that she continued to listen to it. Donaghy has also referred to the album as being "ahead of its time," reflecting its later reassessment by critics and fans as an early example of the group's distinctive blend of R&B, pop, and electronic influences. In 2011, the original members reunited under the name Mutya Keisha Siobhan, later returning to performing as Sugababes after regaining the rights to the group name in 2019. To celebrate its 20th anniversary, a special edition of One Touch was released on 1 October 2021 after being delayed from its original 2020 release due to the COVID-19 pandemic. The reissue was accompanied by a remix of "Run for Cover" by MNEK. Following the anniversary reissue, One Touch reached a new peak of number 18 on the UK Albums Chart.

== Track listing ==
One Touch track listing
No.	Title	Writer(s)	Producer(s)	Length
1.	"Overload"	Keisha Buchanan; Mutya Buena; Siobhán Donaghy; Felix Howard; Cameron McVey; Paul Simm; Jonathan Lipsey	McVey; Jony Rockstar; Simm	4:35
2.	"One Foot In"	Paul Watson; Sonia Cupid; Luke Smith; Donaghy; Buchanan; Buena	Watson; Smith	3:25
3.	"Same Old Story"	John Temis; Matt Rowe; Donaghy; Buchanan; Buena	Matt Rowebottom	3:03
4.	"Just Let It Go"	Temis; Rowe; Donaghy; Buchanan; Buena	Rowebottom	5:01
5.	"Look at Me"	Lipsey; Howard; Simm; Donaghy; Buchanan; Buena	McVey; Rockstar; Simm	3:58
6.	"Soul Sound"	Charlotte Edwards; Sam Harley; Ron Tom	Tom	4:30
7.	"One Touch"	Don-E; Tom	Don-E; Tom	4:20
8.	"Lush Life"	Tom; Carl McIntosh	Tom; McIntosh	4:28
9.	"Real Thing"	John Temis; Rowe; Donaghy; Buchanan; Buena	Rowebottom	4:04
10.	"New Year"	McVey; Lipsey; Howard; Rowe; Donaghy; Buchanan; Buena	McVey; Rockstar; Simm	3:51
11.	"Promises"	McVey; Lipsey; Howard; Simm; Donaghy; Buchanan; Buena	McVey; Rockstar; Simm	3:17
12.	"Run for Cover"	Lipsey; Simm; McVey; Donaghy; Buchanan; Buena	McVey; Rockstar; Simm	3:47

Japanese bonus track
No.	Title	Writer(s)	Producer(s)	Length
13.	"Don't Wanna Wait"	Don-E; Tom	Don-E; Tom	4:42

=== 20 year anniversary edition ===
The 2021 20 year anniversary edition consists of two discs, the first being a remaster of the original album and its B-sides. The second disc includes new remixes from contemporary producers and previously unreleased alternate versions. "Always Be the One" appears on streaming as track 20 on disc 1, but appears as track 1 on disc 2 on the 2CD version. "Little Lady Love" (Original Mix) and "Little Lady Love" (About 2 Remix) have been swapped on both streaming and CD.

20 year anniversary edition – disc one
No.	Title	Writer(s)	Producer(s)	Length
1.	"Overload"	Buchanan; Buena; Donaghy; Howard; McVey; Simm; Lipsey	McVey; Rockstar; Simm	4:35
2.	"One Foot In"	Watson; Cupid; Smith; Donaghy; Buchanan; Buena	Watson; Smith	3:25
3.	"Same Old Story"	Themis; Rowe; Donaghy; Buchanan; Buena	Rowe	3:03
4.	"Just Let It Go"	Themis; Rowe; Donaghy; Buchanan; Buena	Rowe	5:01
5.	"Look at Me"	Lipsey; Howard; Simm; Donaghy; Buchanan; Buena	McVey; Rockstar; Simm	3:58
6.	"Soul Sound"	Edwards; Harley	Tom	4:30
7.	"One Touch"	Don-E; Tom	Don-E; Tom	4:20
8.	"Lush Life"	Tom; McIntosh	Tom; McIntosh	4:28
9.	"Real Thing"	Themis; Rowe; Donaghy; Buchanan; Buena	Rowe	4:04
10.	"New Year"	McVey; Lipsey; Howard; Rowe; Donaghy; Buchanan; Buena	McVey; Rockstar; Simm	3:51
11.	"Promises"	McVey; Lipsey; Howard; Simm; Donaghy; Buchanan; Buena	McVey; Rockstar; Simm	3:17
12.	"Run for Cover"	Lipsey; Simm; McVey; Donaghy; Buchanan; Buena	McVey; Rockstar; Simm	3:47
13.	"Don't Wanna Wait"	Don-E; Tom	Don-E; Tom	4:43
14.	"Sugababes on the Run"	Lucas Secon; Don-E; Tom	Lucas; Don-E	3:34
15.	"Forever"	Themis; Rowe; Donaghy; Buchanan; Buena	Rowe	2:56
16.	"Little Lady Love" (About 2 Remix)	McVey; Lipsey; Simm; Donaghy; Buchanan; Buena	McVey; Rockstar; Simm; Remix Produced by; About 2	5:05
17.	"Sometimes"	Themis; Rowe; Clarkson; Donaghy; Buchanan; Buena	Rowe	3:27
18.	"This Is What You Need" (demo)	Tom	Tom	3:52
19.	"Girls' Nite Out" (demo)	McVey; Lipsey; Donaghy; Buchanan; Buena	McVey; Rockstar; Simm	3:49
20.	"Always Be the One" (demo)	Tom	Tom	5:18

20 year anniversary edition – disc two
No.	Title	Writer(s)	Production / Remix	Length
1.	"Run for Cover" (MNEK Remix)	Lipsey; Simm; McVey; Donaghy; Buchanan; Buena	MNEK	3:33
2.	"Overload" (Majestic Remix)	Buchanan; Buena; Donaghy; Howard; McVey; Simm; Lipsey	Majestic	4:59
3.	"Same Old Story" (Blood Orange Remix)	Temis; Rowe; Donaghy; Buchanan; Buena	Dev Hynes	3:48
4.	"Overload" (Metronomy vs Tatyana Remix)	Buchanan; Buena; Donaghy; Howard; McVey; Simm; Lipsey	Metronomy & Tatyana	4:21
5.	"Just Let It Go" (2001 version)	Themis; Rowe; Donaghy; Buchanan; Buena		4:54
6.	"Look at Me" (alternative mix)	Lipsey; Howard; Simm; Donaghy; Buchanan; Buena		4:51
7.	"Real Thing" (alternative version)	Themis; Rowe; Donaghy; Buchanan; Buena		3:33
8.	"Soul Sound" (alternative version)	Edwards; Harley	McVey; Simm	5:07
9.	"One Touch" (C.R.E.A.M. Remix)	Don-E; Tom	Remixed by Charles	4:02
10.	"New Year" (non Christmas version)	McVey; Lipsey; Howard; Rowe; Donaghy; Buchanan; Buena		3:53
11.	"Promises" (acoustic mix)	McVey; Lipsey; Howard; Simm; Donaghy; Buchanan; Buena		3:06
12.	"Little Lady Love" (original mix)	McVey; Lipsey; Simm; Donaghy; Buchanan; Buena	McVey; Rockstar; Simm	3:38
13.	"Overload" (Ed Case Remix)	Buchanan; Buena; Donaghy; Howard; McVey; Simm; Lipsey	Remixed by Ed Case	4:49
14.	"Run for Cover" (G4orce All Things Nice Dub)	Lipsey; Simm; McVey; Donaghy; Buchanan; Buena	Remix & Additional Production by G4orce	4:29
15.	"Real Thing" (2-Step Radio Mix)	Themis; Rowe; Donaghy; Buchanan; Buena	Remixed by Jimmy T & Themis	3:09

20 year anniversary edition – Amazon exclusive bonus disc
No.	Title	Writer(s)	Producer(s)	Length
1.	"The Other Side" (demo)	Howard; Aslan; Cheema	McVey; Rockstar; Simm	4:06
2.	"All Around the World" (demo)	Tom	Tom	3:47
3.	"One Touch" (alternative mix)	Don-E; Tom	Don-E; Tom	4:48
4.	"One Foot In" (alternative mix)	Watson; Cupid; Smith; Donaghy; Buchanan; Buena	Watson; Smith	3:30
5.	"Sugababes on the Run" (alternative mix)	Secon; Don-E; Tom	Lucas; Don-E; Additional Production & Mix; McVey; Simm	3:46
6.	"Soul Sound" (Medway City Heights Edit)	Edwards; Harley	Tom	4:30

== Charts ==
=== Weekly charts ===
2001 weekly chart performance for One Touch
Chart (2001)	Peak position
Australian Albums (ARIA)	63
Austrian Albums (Ö3 Austria)	6
German Albums (Offizielle Top 100)	7
Irish Albums (IRMA)	55
New Zealand Albums (RMNZ)	16
Scottish Albums (Official Charts)	40
Swiss Albums (Schweizer Hitparade)	8
UK Albums (Official Charts)	26
UK R&B Albums (Official Charts)	3
European Albums (Eurotipsheet)	59

2021 weekly chart performance for One Touch
Chart (2021)	Peak position
Scottish Albums (Official Charts)	9
UK Albums (Official Charts)	18
UK Independent Albums (Official Charts)	1

=== Year-end charts ===
Year-end chart performance for One Touch
Chart (2001)	Position
German Albums (Offizielle Top 100)	86
UK Albums (OCC)	157

== Certifications ==
Certifications of One Touch
Region	Certification	Certified units/sales
United Kingdom (BPI)	Gold	226,000

== Release history ==
One Touch release history
Region	Date	Edition(s)	Label
United Kingdom	27 November 2000	Standard	London
Austria	11 December 2000	Standard	London
Germany	11 December 2000	Standard	London
Switzerland	11 December 2000	Standard	London
Ireland	25 January 2001	Standard	London
Italy	March 2001	Standard	London
New Zealand	March 2001	Standard	London
United States	30 June 2001	Standard	London
Canada	30 June 2001	Standard	London
Australia	August 2001	Standard	London
Japan	22 August 2001	Standard	Warner Music Japan
Various	1 October 2021	20 Year Anniversary edition	London
