= The Lost Tapes (Sugababes album) =

2022 studio album by Sugababes

Studio album by Sugababes
- Released: 24 December 2022
- Recorded: November 2011 – June 2013 (original recordings); November – December 2022 (additional)
- Genres: Dance-pop; soul; R&B
- Length: 50:41
- Label: Self-released

Sugababes chronology
| Sweet 7 (2010) | The Lost Tapes (2022) | Sugababes (2027) |

The Lost Tapes is the eighth studio album by British girl group Sugababes, which was self-released on 24 December 2022. The album was recorded between 2011 and 2013, when the original lineup reformed under the name Mutya Keisha Siobhan (MKS), however it remained unreleased due to most of the tracks being leaked. The deluxe version, which included an additional three tracks, was released on 31 December 2022.

The album was released for digital download and onto streaming services, after which it charted at number 150 on the UK Albums Chart, and number 13 on the UK Independent Albums Chart. Following their one-off show at the O2 Arena in September 2023, the album reached a new peak of number 7 on the UK Independent Albums Chart, as well as charting at number 23 on the Scottish Albums Chart. It was issued on vinyl for the first time that same month, with a limited number of copies available.

== Background ==
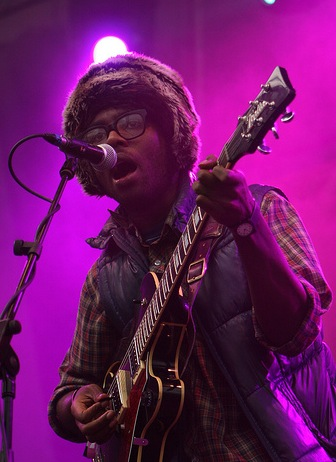
British artist Dev Hynes (pictured) produced and co-wrote "Flatline".

In 2009, the line-up of the Sugababes featured Keisha Buchanan, Heidi Range and Amelle Berrabah, who were gearing up for the release of their seventh album Sweet 7 in early 2010. However, prior to the album's release, Buchanan left the group in September 2009, and she was subsequently replaced by Jade Ewen. Shortly after original member Mutya Buena won the legal rights to use the name Sugababes under Class 16 of the EU Trademark Act, both Buena and Buchanan individually tweeted about recording in the studio. Buchanan said she was in the studio with "two other females" and British rapper Professor Green, while Buena separately tweeted "Tunnnnnnnnne! What a banger. I could pee myself with excitment lol but I won't. [sic]" Both Buena and Buchanan denied that they were in the studio together and said that they were not working on music for the Sugababes, with Buena saying: "No track [with] keisha or professor G he was around tha studio. im jus workin on my stuff @ tha moment. [sic]" Despite this, Scottish singer-songwriter Emeli Sandé confirmed to MTV UK that she had written new songs for Buena, Buchanan and Siobhán Donaghy, saying: "Yes, that is true. I've written for the original line-up of the Sugababes, which I'm very happy about because I just loved them when they first came out. I loved their sound, it was so cool. It was very different, so I'm happy to kind of be involved in what started the whole Sugababes journey. It sounds amazing." The Lost Tapes is the second Sugababes album to feature the original lineup, after 2000's One Touch.

In April 2012, it was reported that the line-up had signed a £1 million record deal with Polydor Records. In July 2012, it was officially confirmed that the group had reformed under the name Mutya Keisha Siobhan and were writing songs for a new album under Polydor. The group enlisted Naughty Boy, MNEK, Sia and Shaznay Lewis as collaborators for the album. Speaking of working with the group, MNEK said, "I'd just turned 17 when Felix Howard messaged me to say that the original Sugababes are singing together again and I want you to write with them'. I wasn't gonna say no was I [sic]". According to the singer-producer, the song "Today" was supposed to be the first single. MNEK also worked on "Drum" and the song "Boys" with Richard "Biff" Stannard.

The album's original title was reportedly The Sacred Three, named after the group's comeback concert tour. A song originally recorded for the album, "Love in Stereo", went on to be recorded by Bananarama for their album In Stereo (2019). In June 2016, Siobhán Donaghy stated that the album was expected to be released in 2017. In August 2017 Buchanan said in an interview that the group were working on new material after their previous work was leaked online. Amongst the first songs to leak was a version of the song "Back in the Day", which sampled the song of the same name by Ahmad in February 2015. A year later, in late 2016, eight several other songs from the album, which was in varying degrees of completion, were leaked, including: "Boys", "Love in Stereo", "Today", "No Regrets", "Summer of '99", "Too in Love", "I'm Alright" and "Drum". Another song, "Burn Out" also leaked, which was later reclaimed by its writer Tom Aspaul. The group had also uploaded a song called "Lay Down in Swimming Pools", which sampled the Kendrick Lamar song "Swimming Pools (Drank)" to their SoundCloud account at the end of a studio session with Dev Hynes. This song would later be re-recorded with new vocals and new instrumental to become The Lost Tapes' song "I Lay Down".

In January 2023, Buchanan posted a behind-the-scenes vlog from December 2022 onto her YouTube channel, which detailed a recording session in which she did the backing vocals to the song "Beat is Gone". During the vlog, she explained that while she was re-recording one of her verses, she discovered that many of the group's backing vocals were now missing from several tracks due to a partial loss of the original session files, prompting the group to begin re-recording the vocals in preparation for the album's release. In a video posted to her YouTube channel in March 2023, Buchanan said that the album originally did not have a title until she suggested The Lost Tapes as a title. She also stated that the group were unable to include "Too in Love" on the album because it had already been purchased and subsequently used by another artist by the time the group were in a position to release The Lost Tapes.

== Music and lyrics ==
The album includes '80s-inspired pop, which is most present on the single "Flatline", initially released in June 2013, pop rock influences as seen on "Summer of '99" and ''Boys'', and elements of breakbeat, which is notable on songs such as "Today".

The song "Boys" features on the album, of which a short a cappella clip was uploaded on Buchanan's YouTube account in January 2013. The clip quickly attracted attention, surpassing 100,000 views. The same day, Popjustice released a three-second clip of the studio version of the single, calling it "simply amazing". A handful of the songs included on the album, namely "I'm Alright", "Love Me Hard", "Today" and "No Regrets", were previously performed by the trio at their first official headline gig at the Scala nightclub on 1 August 2013. "Flatline" and "Today" were amongst the songs performed throughout their various festival performances and headline tour in 2022.

== Promotion and release ==
"Flatline" was originally released on 6 September 2013 under the Mutya Keisha Siobhan name through Polydor Records. The single was re-released on 9 June 2022 independently under the Sugababes name. The Sugababes announced the surprise release of The Lost Tapes on social media, stating "We wrote this album almost 8 years ago and for various reasons it didn't get an official release, so it's with great pride that The Lost Tapes is available now on all streaming platforms". The group confirmed that they had released the album independently, and were in control of its rollout.

=== Tour ===
Sugababes UK & Europe Tour
- Tour by Sugababes
- Location: England; Scotland; Wales
- Associated album: The Lost Tapes
- Start date: 16 October 2022
- End date: 20 September 2023
- Legs: 2
- No. of shows: 21
- Supporting act: Kara Marni

Sugababes concert chronology
- The Sacred Three Tour (2013); Sugababes UK & Europe Tour (2022–2023); Australia Tour (2024–2025)

Though not formally announced to promote The Lost Tapes, the Sugababes went on tour across the UK and some countries in Europe in October and November 2022 and September 2023. The group performed songs spanning nearly all of the line-ups and were supported by London singer Kara Marni. The setlist also included songs "Today" and "Love Me Hard" from The Lost Tapes, which at the time of the tour were officially unreleased. According to Buchanan, former Sugababes members Range and Berrabah were supporting the group from afar.

==== Set list ====
The set list is taken from Norwich show at the Nick Rayns LCR, it is not intended to represent every date of the tour.

1. "Push the Button"
2. "Red Dress"
3. "Hole in the Head"
4. "Too Lost in You"
5. "Flatline"
6. "2 Hearts"
7. "Today"
8. "Ugly"
9. "Love Me Hard"
10. "Stronger"
11. "Same Old Story" (Interlude)
12. "Overload"
13. "Garage Medley"
14. "Flowers" (Sweet Female Attitude cover)
15. "Round Round"
16. "Freak Like Me"
17. "About You Now"

== Commercial performance ==
After five days of tracking, The Lost Tapes debuted at number 150 on the UK Albums Chart following its digital-only release, with 1,108 album-equivalent units. Additionally, the album debuted at number two on the UK Album Downloads Chart and at number 13 on the UK Independent Albums Chart. After the deluxe version of the album was released, the tracks "Back to Life", "Only You" and "Breathe Me" charted at numbers 49, 58 and 62, on the UK Singles Downloads Chart on 6 January 2023.

Following its limited release on CD and vinyl in September 2023, The Lost Tapes charted at number 5 on the UK Official Record Store chart, number 8 on the UK Official Vinyl Albums Chart, number 13 on the Official Physical Albums Chart, number 14 on the Official Albums Sales Chart and rose to number 7 on the UK Independent Albums Chart.

== Track listing ==
The Lost Tapes – Standard edition
| No. | Title | Writer(s) | Length |
|---|---|---|---|
| 1. | "Drum" | Keisha Buchanan; Siobhán Donaghy; Uzoechi Emenike | 3:34 |
| 2. | "Flatline" | Buchanan; Mutya Buena; Donaghy; Devonte Hynes | 3:53 |
| 3. | "Love Me Hard" | Buchanan; Donaghy; Iain James; Richard "Biff" Stannard | 3:42 |
| 4. | "Summer of '99" | Donaghy; Jim Eliot; Shaznay Lewis | 3:58 |
| 5. | "Boys" | Buchanan; Donaghy; Emenike; Ash Howes; Lewis; Stannard | 3:05 |
| 6. | "Metal Heart" | Buchanan; Buena; Donaghy; Cameron McVey; Paul Simm | 4:25 |
| 7. | "Beat Is Gone" | Buchanan; Donaghy; Wayne Hector; Howes; Stannard | 4:29 |
| 8. | "No Regrets" | Buchanan; Hugo Chegwin; Harry Craze; Donaghy; Ben Harrison; Felix Howard; James; Luke Juby | 4:01 |
| 9. | "Today" | Buchanan; Buena; Gifty Dankwah; Donaghy; Emenike | 3:42 |
| 10. | "Victory" | Mitch Allan; Buchanan; Donaghy; Jason Evigan; Sia Furler | 3:12 |
| 11. | "I'm Alright" | Seton Daunt; Donaghy; Bradford Ellis; Howes; James; Stannard | 4:04 |
| 12. | "I Lay Down" | Buchanan; Donaghy; Simm; McVey | 4:08 |
| 13. | "Back in the Day" | Buchanan; Buena; Donaghy; James Murray; Mustafa Omer | 4:23 |
| Total length: | | | 50:41 |

The Lost Tapes – Digital deluxe edition bonus tracks
| No. | Title | Writer(s) | Length |
|---|---|---|---|
| 14. | "Back to Life" | Tunde Babalola; Buchanan; Buena; Donaghy; Ed Drewett; Darren Lewis | 3:34 |
| 15. | "Breathe Me" | Dan Carey; Mikkel Eriksen; Furler; Tor Erik Hermansen | 4:17 |
| 16. | "Only You" | Buchanan; Buena; Donaghy; Howes; Stannard | 4:11 |
| Total length: | | | 62:43 |

Notes

- "Back in the Day" interpolates the song of the same name by Ahmad.
- "Breathe Me" is a cover of the song of the same name by Sia, written by Sia and Dan Carey.

== Charts ==
Chart performance for The Lost Tapes
| Chart (2022–2023) | Peak position |
|---|---|
| Scottish Albums (Official Charts) | 23 |
| UK Albums (Official Charts) | 150 |
| UK Album Downloads (Official Charts) | 2 |
| Record Store Chart (Official Charts) | 5 |
| UK Independent Albums (Official Charts) | 7 |
| Vinyl Albums (Official Charts) | 8 |

== Release history ==
The Lost Tapes release history
| Region | Date | Format(s) | Edition(s) | Label | Ref. |
|---|---|---|---|---|---|
| Various | 24 December 2022 | Digital download; streaming | Standard | Self-released | |
| Various | 31 December 2022 | Digital download; streaming | Deluxe | Self-released | |
| Various | 15 September 2023 | LP | Standard | Self-released | |
