= A Little Sound =

English musician and TikToker (born 1999)

- Born: Abigail Kate Morgan; 17 February 1999 (age 27); Taunton, England
- Origin: Bristol
- Genre: Drum and bass
- Occupations: Singer; songwriter; social media personality
- Label: Ministry of Sound
- Member of: Born on Road
- Website: www.alittlesound.uk

Abigail Kate Morgan (born 17 February 1999), known professionally as A Little Sound, is an English drum and bass musician, songwriter and DJ. She won Best Vocalist at the Drum&BassArena Awards 2022 and Best Vocalist & Best Female DJ at the Drum & Bass Awards 2024.

== Life and career ==
=== Early life and releases ===
Abigail Kate Morgan was born on 17 February 1999 and was raised in Taunton. She spent a year studying at a university in Chichester before moving to Bristol to study at the city's British and Irish Modern Music Institute. She started writing songs when she was ten, and uploading covers of popular acoustic and country songs to her YouTube channel "A Little Sound" when she was eleven, which she then started annotating with drum and bass after finding her tracks weren't attracting views. One cover version, of "Reality" by Lost Frequencies, attracted 100,000 views, which brought her to the attention of Kanine; Morgan would feature on two records by them, "Face Away" on 25 October 2019, and "Back In Time" on 21 February 2020.

On 28 February 2020, she featured on Gray's "Fallen"; she and Gray would work together again on 4 November 2022's "Memories". On 3 June 2020, she featured on Technimatic's "Lakota", which she wrote about meeting her boyfriend at Lakota, and recorded just before the March 2020 UK lockdown. The song has been streamed more than 5,000,000 times. On 5 August 2022 she featured on their "Confide"; she came to their attention after they saw her cover of their "Parallel". On 17 August 2020, she and DJ Gaw and Selecta J-Man released "Rum & Lime"; she and DJ Gaw would later release "Feels Wrong" on 20 August 2021, and on 6 January 2023 she and Inja featured on Mandidextrous and Selecta J-Man's "Hold Your Rhythm", from Boomtown's "Chapter One: The Gathering"'s closing ceremony.

=== Later releases ===
On 1 September 2020 she featured on Shapes' "Our Time". On 18 November 2020, she featured on Annix's "Overload"; she and Annix would later release "Kaleidoscope" on 22 June 2021. On 27 November 2020 she featured on Levela's "Moving Forward". On 5 March 2021, she and Sonic Rain released "Stuck in the Mindset", and on 28 May 2021, she and Zero released "Sorry 4 Skanking". On 25 June 2021, Paul T & Edward Oberon released "Wake Up" with A Little Sound, and on 20 August 2021 she and Low:r released "Be There". On 7 January 2022, she and Vibe Chemistry featured on an Allstars MIC, a fortnightly DnB Allstars series; she would on 9 June 2023 feature on the official remix of Rudimental, Charlotte Plank and Vibe Chemistry's "Dancing is Healing".

On 4 February 2022, she and Document One released "Back To Me", and on 22 April 2022 she and Kleu released "Something Bout U". On 9 September 2022, she featured on Friction's "Weed & Wine (Relax, Rewind)". On 1 November 2022, she released her début solo single, "Breathe"; she would later release "The Other Side" with Dr. Meaker on 4 November 2022, and the EP A Little Sound on 4 November 2022, which included "Memories", "Breathe" and "The Other Side". On 8 December 2022, she won Best Vocalist at the Drum&BassArena Awards 2022.

On 30 August 2024, she released the single "Situation" alongside group Sugababes, which interpolates their earlier track "Overload". She wrote the track during a session with Billen Ted and Katy Tiz, and was moved to use the hook after Ted began humming its melody. The Sugababes added their harmonies during a subsequent session.

On 21 February 2025, A Little Sound released the single "Area Code". On 2 April 2025, she released "Final Breath", a single in collaboration with artist Subtronics, taken from the latter's EP Fibonacci Part 1: Oblivion. She released the single "Override" on 22 April 2025.

== Artistry ==
Her early references were Gabrielle Aplin, Red Hot Chili Peppers, Hannah Montana, The Prodigy, and Gorillaz, though her early YouTube videos were inspired by Miley Cyrus. She was introduced to drum and bass after watching Chase & Status perform, and decided to become a drum and bass vocalist after seeing Anne-Marie perform with Rudimental at Boardmasters 2016. Morgan is a member of Born on Road, a Bristol-based music collective of drum and bass musicians co-founded by Kelvin 373 and Aries in late 2012.

== Discography ==
=== Extended plays ===
List of extended plays, with selected details
Title	Details
A Little Sound EP	Released: 4 November 2022; Label: Copyright Control, Born on Road; Format: Digital download, streaming

=== Singles ===
List of singles as lead artist, showing year released and originating album
Title	Year	Album
"Face Away" (with Kanine)	2019	Non-album singles
"Back in Time" (with Kanine)	2020	Non-album singles
"Fallen" (with Gray)	2020	Non-album singles
"Lakota" (with Technimatic)	2020	Non-album singles
"Rum & Lime" (with DJ Gaw & Selecta J-Man)	2020	Non-album singles
"Our Time" (with Shapes)	2020	Non-album singles
"Overload" (with Annix)	2020	Non-album singles
"Moving Forward" (with Levela)	2020	Non-album singles
"Stuck in the Mindset" (with Sonic Rain)	2021	Non-album singles
"Sorry 4 Skanking" (with Zero)	2021	Non-album singles
"Kaleidoscope" (with Annix)	2021	Non-album singles
"Wake Up" (with Paul T & Edward Oberon)	2021	Non-album singles
"Be There" (with Low:r)	2021	Non-album singles
"Feels Wrong" (with DJ Gaw)	2021	Non-album singles
"Allstars MIC" (feat. DnB Allstars)	2022	Non-album singles
"Back to Me" (with Document One)	2022	Non-album singles
"Something Bout U" (with Kleu)	2022	Non-album singles
"Back In Time" (with Kanine)	2022	Non-album singles
"Twilight" (with Gray)	2022	Non-album singles
"Confide" (with Technimatic)	2022	Non-album singles
"Weed & Wine (Relax, Rewind)" (with Friction)	2022	Non-album singles
"Breathe"	2022	Non-album singles
"Memories"	2022	A Little Sound EP
"The Other Side"	2022	A Little Sound EP
"Missing You" (with Hedex)	2023	Non-album singles
"Back to Back (B2B)"	2023	Non-album singles
"Escape the Lights" (feat. Disrupta)	2024	Non-album singles
"Can't Walk Away" (with 49th & Main)	2024	Non-album singles
*"Situation" (with Sugababes)	2024	Non-album singles
"Area Code" (feat. S.P.Y & CMD/CTRL)	2025	Non-album singles
"Final Breath" (with Subtronics)	2025	Non-album singles
"Override"	2025	Non-album singles
