= New Year (song) =

2000 single by Sugababes

Single by Sugababes

from the album One Touch
- B-side: "Forever"; "Little Lady Love"; "Sugababes on the Run"
- Released: 18 December 2000
- Studio: Bear (London, England)
- Genre: Pop; R&B
- Length: 3:50
- Label: London
- Songwriters: Cameron McVey; Jony Lipsey; Felix Howard; Matt Rowe; Sugababes
- Producers: Cameron McVey; Jony Rockstar; Paul Simm

Sugababes singles chronology
"Overload" (2000)	"New Year" (2000)	"Run for Cover" (2001)

Music video
- "New Year" on YouTube

"New Year" is a song by British girl group the Sugababes, released as the second single from their debut studio album One Touch (2000). The song was written by group members Siobhán Donaghy, Mutya Buena and Keisha Buchanan in collaboration with Cameron McVey, Jony Lipsey, Felix Howard and Matt Rowe, and produced by McVey, Lipsey and Paul Simm. "New Year" is a pop and R&B ballad with influences of soul and alternative rock. It features acoustic instrumentation, and the lyrics describe the experience of breaking up on Christmas Day.

Critics praised the song for its seasonal nature and the group's performance. Upon release, it charted at number twelve in the United Kingdom and number twenty-five in Ireland. To promote the song, a music video was directed by Alex Hamming and filmed in London. On 31 December 2012 the trio performed "New Year" at a New Year's Eve party in London, under their new group name Mutya Keisha Siobhan.

== Background and release ==
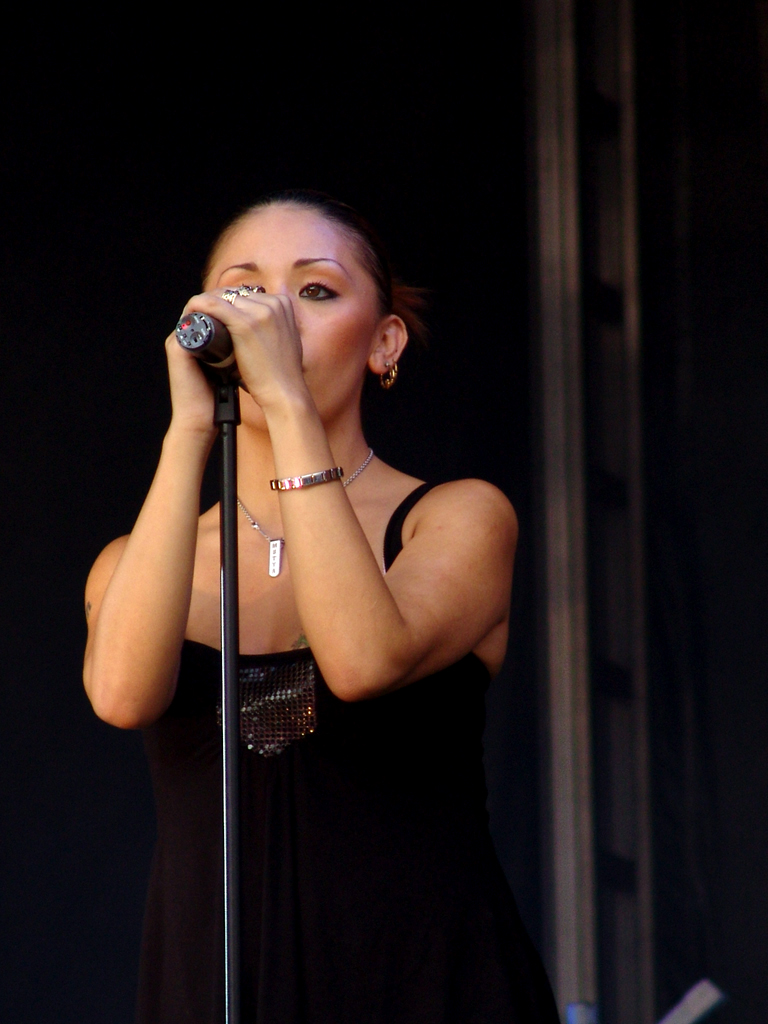
Mutya Buena (pictured) formed the Sugababes with Siobhán Donaghy and Keisha Buchanan in 1998.

British girl group the Sugababes were formed in 1998 by Siobhán Donaghy, Mutya Buena and Keisha Buchanan. Donaghy and Buena first met during an a cappella gig, where they heard each other sing and later performed a duet. The duo decided to work together on a new song, and while they were in the studio, Buchanan came to visit her friend Buena. Donaghy's manager, Ron Tom, concluded that the trio were to join as a band, known as the Sugababes. They later signed to London Records and began writing songs for their debut album One Touch.

"New Year" was written by the group's members in collaboration with Cameron McVey, Jony Lipsey, Matt Rowe and Felix Howard. The song was produced by McVey, Lipsey and Paul Simm. It was recorded and engineered by Goetz Botzenhardt at Bear Studios, and mixed by its producers at Metropolis Studios. London Records released "New Year" in the United Kingdom on 18 December 2000 as the second single from One Touch. Two B-sides were featured on the first CD single: "Forever" and "Sugababes on the Run". On the second CD, a B-side titled "Little Lady Love" was included. "New Year" was omitted from the group's greatest hits album Overloaded: The Singles Collection.

== Composition and lyrics ==
"New Year" is a midtempo pop and R&B ballad with influences of soul and alternative rock. It contains acoustic instrumentation in the form of beats, bass, strings, guitar and keys, and features tight production juxtaposed with the group's harmonious vocals. Writers for the BBC characterised the song as having "a melodic swagger" reminiscent of All Saints' earlier work, and a "classy arrangement [...] boosted by an infectiously splashy drumbeat and stabs of acoustic guitar". "New Year" features a seasonal theme, focussing on the holiday of Christmas, which is referenced in the song's lyrics. It is about the experience of a breakup on Christmas Day. According to Betty Clarke of The Guardian, "New Year" "tells [a tale] of festive fumblings to Last Christmas", and through lines such as "I'm older than my years, drowning in my tears" the Sugababes are shown singing with insight.

== Reception ==
=== Critical ===
The song was raved by critics. A journalist from the BBC wrote that the single as "lives up to the hype" and praised the inclusion of lyrics about Christmas as "without sounding remotely contrived". The Sunday Herald's Samuel McGuire interpreted "New Year" as a "mellow [and] dewy-eyed" song that will "undoubtedly cement [the Sugababes'] 'new All Saints' tag early in 2001". Eva Simpson of the Daily Mirror gave a positive review, writing: "Taken from outstanding debut album One Touch, this soulful track is head and shoulders above other festive releases. A must for Christmas stockings." Yahoo Music's Andy Strickland stated that while "New Year" is not as "wired or skewed" as the group's debut single "Overload", it is a representation of the group members' vocal abilities. Hot Press writer Stephen Robinson praised the song as "a shameless attempt at a January hit", while Peter Robinson called it the group's best ballad. In December 2012 Bernadette McNulty of The Daily Telegraph picked it out as one of the newspaper's favourite Christmas songs:

A relentless tearjerker from the pouty North London teenagers off their debut album. Sneakily giving the song a title that makes it last throughout the festive season, this updates old school girl-group harmonies from Christmas classics by the likes of the Ronettes with a clunky drum beat.

=== Commercial ===
Because of its release around Christmas time, media outlets considered "New Year" to be a contender for the 2000 Christmas number one. In the issue dated 30 December 2000 the song debuted and peaked at number twelve on the UK Singles Chart, where it charted for nine weeks. By early 2010, it had sold approximately 85,000 copies in the United Kingdom and was the group's eighteenth highest-selling single there. "New Year" reached number twenty-five on the Irish Singles Chart, where it appeared for five weeks.

== Promotion ==
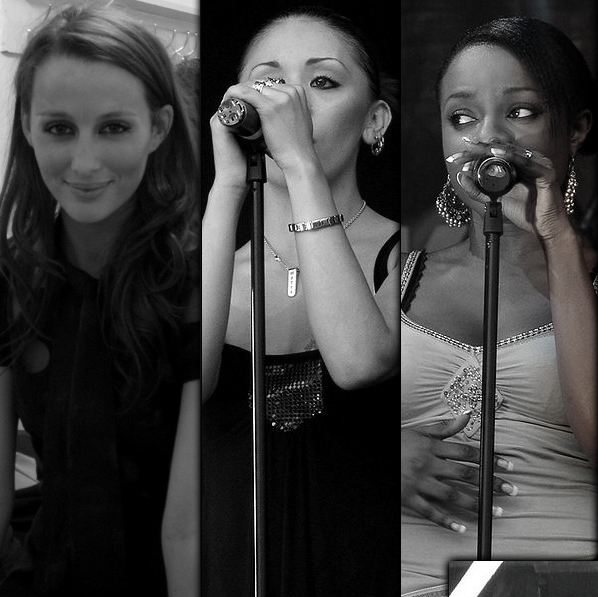
From left to right: Siobhán Donaghy, Mutya Buena, Keisha Buchanan.

=== Music video ===
To promote "New Year", a music video was directed by Alex Hamming and filmed in London, England. It was included on the song's CD release. The video is mainly black-and-white, but also features shades of pink and blue. During the video, the group's members sing in front of a white background, while computer graphics such as snow, letters and butterflies appear throughout. Other features in the video include a bird cage, stars and a calendar. Donaghy, Buena and Buchanan are shown both individually and collectively in the video; in some clips they are seated on chairs and against walls. The Daily Telegraph's Bernadette McNulty described their appearance in the clips, writing: "The original trio sulk their way through the video in boot-cut jeans and smudged eyeliner".

=== Live performances ===
The Sugababes performed "New Year" on 15 December 2000 broadcast of TFI Friday. In October 2011, news outlets began to report that the original members of the Sugababes would reform. In July 2012, it was officially confirmed that they had reformed under the name Mutya Keisha Siobhan. The trio played their first gig together in over ten years on 31 December 2012 at a New Year's Eve party held in London. "New Year" was the second song on the set list, which also included their songs "Overload" and "Freak like Me", and a cover version of Rihanna's single "Diamonds".

== Cover versions ==
The song was covered by Welsh indie pop band the Darling Buds and released as a digital single on Oddbox Records on 15 December 2018.

== Track listings ==
UK CD1
No.	Title	Writer(s)	Producer(s)	Length
1.	"New Year"	Cameron McVey; Jonathan Lipsey; Felix Howard; Matt Rowe; Keisha Buchanan; Mutya Buena; Siobhán Donaghy	McVey; Jony Rockstar; Paul Simm	3:50
2.	"Sugababes on the Run"	Ron Tom; Donald McLean; Lucas Secon	Secon; Don-E	3:34
3.	"Forever"	Rowe; John Themis; Buchanan; Buena; Donaghy	Rowe	2:55

UK CD2
No.	Title	Writer(s)	Producer(s)	Length
1.	"New Year"	McVey; Lipsey; Howard; Rowe; Buchanan; Buena; Donaghy	McVey; Rockstar; Simm	3:50
2.	"Little Lady Love" (About 2 remix)	McVey; Lipsey; Simm; Buchanan; Buena; Donaghy	McVey; Rockstar; Simm; About 2^{[a]}	5:06
3.	"New Year" (Protest mix)	McVey; Lipsey; Howard; Rowe; Buchanan; Buena; Donaghy	McVey; Rockstar; Simm; Protest^{[a]}	4:10
4.	"New Year" (video)

UK cassette single
No.	Title	Writer(s)	Producer(s)	Length
1.	"New Year"	McVey; Lipsey; Howard; Rowe; Buchanan; Buena; Donaghy	McVey; Rockstar; Simm	3:50
2.	"Forever"	Buchanan; Buena; Donaghy; Rowe; Themis	Rowe	2:55

Notes

- ^{^a} denotes additional producer(s)

== Credits and personnel ==
Credits are adapted from the liner notes of One Touch.

Recording

- Recorded by Goetz Botzenhardt at Bear Studios, London, England

Personnel

- Songwriting – Cameron McVey, Jony Lipsey, Matt Rowe, Felix Howard, Sugababes
- Production – Cameron McVey, Jony Rockstar, Paul Simm
- Mixing – Cameron McVey, Jony Rockstar, Paul Simm
- Mix engineer – Goetz Botzenhardt
- Programming – Jony Rockstar
- Beats – Jony Rockstar
- Bass – Jony Rockstar
- Strings – Matt Rowe
- Guitar – Jeremy Shaw
- Wurlitzer – Paul Simm
- Keys – Cameron McVey

== Charts ==
Chart (2000)	Peak position
Europe (Eurochart Hot 100)	49
Ireland (IRMA)	25
Scottish Singles Sales (Official Charts)	12
UK Singles (Official Charts)	12
UK Airplay (Music Week)	8
