= Kara Marni =

English singer and songwriter (born 1998)

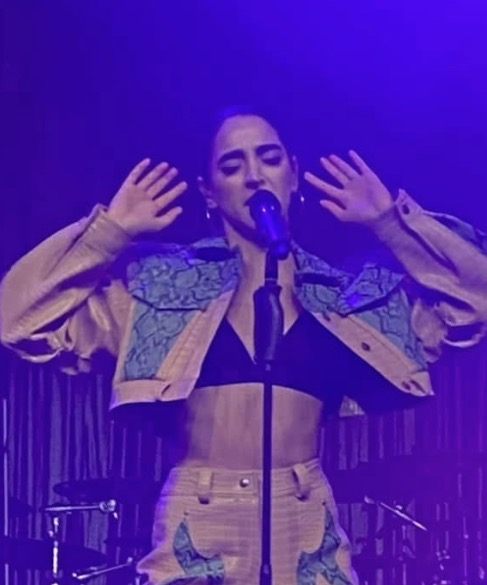
- Marni in 2022

Background information
- Born: Antonia Maria Karamani; 21 May 1997 (age 29); East Finchley, London, England
- Genres: Soul; R&B; pop
- Occupations: Singer; songwriter
- Years active: 2017–present
- Label: Access Records

Antonia Maria Karamani (born 21 May 1997), known professionally as Kara Marni, is an English singer and songwriter. After uploading various covers of songs on YouTube, she was signed to Access Records and released her debut extended-play, Love Just Ain’t Enough, in 2018. She released follow up EPs titled No Logic and State of Mine in 2019 and 2021, respectively, as well as releasing further singles and featuring on those of other artists.

== Early life ==
Antonia Maria Karamani was born on 21 May 1997 in East Finchley, London. She is of Greek Cypriot descent. She has a twin sister Katerina, and a brother. Marni began singing aged three and developed an interest in music from a young age. She described "the first time [she] heard Minnie Riperton's "Lovin' You" on the school run. As soon as [she] got home [she] was asking for that CD, playing it on [her] broken fuchsia pink CD player." Marni had a shed at the bottom of her garden with a piano and recording equipment in where she would practice music. She went on to enroll at the BRIT School, however later dropped out because she found that "the competitiveness was quite toxic".

== Career ==
=== 2017–2020: Love Just Ain't Enough and No Logic ===
After Marni began uploading covers of songs on YouTube, she was discovered and subsequently signed by Access Records in 2017, releasing covers including "Nothing Even Matters", "No Ordinary Love" and "Wish I Didn't Miss You". She released her single "Golden" in September that year, which featured on her debut extended play, Love Just Ain't Enough, (2018). That same month, she was the support act on the European leg of Rita Ora's the Girls Tour. She also released a further single, "Move", as well as a cover of "My Love Is Your Love" by Whitney Houston. She also featured on a song titled "Changes" alongside Nitin Sawhney for the Netflix film Mowgli: Legend of the Jungle. In October 2019, Marni released her second extended play, No Logic. In 2020, she collaborated on the song "Young Heart" with rapper Russ. Marni then went on to perform at various festivals including Glastonbury, Wireless, Reading and Leeds and the Isle of Wight Festival.

=== 2021–present: State of Mine and further singles ===
In April 2021, Marni released a single "Twisted Fantasy", which was described by Clash magazine as "soulful club music at its best". In September 2021, Marni released her third extended play State of Mine, which featured her song "Trippin", which interpolates the hook of the song "1 Thing" by Amerie. Marni later performed the song live on Sunday Brunch. In November 2022, Marni supported the Sugababes on their UK & Europe Tour. In 2023, she released a cover of Elvis Presley's "Can't Help Falling in Love" and a further single, "I Got Problems". In 2024, she released the singles "Wild, Young & Free", "Wasteman" and "Love You Left Behind". In 2025, she released the single "Love Bomb", which peaked at number 19 on the UK Singles Sales Chart. She also featured on the Professor Green song "On My Way" alongside Zdot. In 2027, she is set to release the single "Nun Club".

== Artistry and influences ==
Marni has described her sound as "soul and R&B, with sprinklings of pop." She has described some of her influences as Aretha Franklin, Minnie Riperton, Chaka Khan, Roberta Flack, Amy Winehouse, Nina Simone, Diana Ross, Donna Summer, Nao, Lauryn Hill, Erykah Badu, Patti Labelle, H.E.R., SZA, Ray BLK and Mahalia. Marni's songs have been described as "[revamping] the sounds of early 00s R&B [that] showcase her talent in writing compelling and heartfelt songs".

== Discography ==
=== Extended plays ===
List of extended plays, with release details
| Title | Details |
|---|---|
| Love Just Ain't Enough | Released: 10 May 2018; Label: Access Records; Formats: Digital download, streaming |
| No Logic | Released: 11 October 2019; Label: Access Records; Formats: Digital download, streaming |
| State of Mine | Released: 17 September 2021; Label: Access Records; Formats: Digital download, streaming |

=== Singles ===
==== As lead artist ====
List of singles as lead artist, showing year released, peak chart positions and album name
| Title | Year | Peak chart positions | Album |
| Title | Year | UK Sales | Album |
|---|---|---|---|
| "Nothing Even Matters" (feat. XanVolo) | 2017 | — | Non-album singles |
| "No Ordinary Love" | 2017 | — | Non-album singles |
| "Wish I Didn't Miss You" | 2017 | — | Non-album singles |
| "Golden" | 2017 | — | Love Just Ain't Enough |
| "Curve" | 2018 | — | Love Just Ain't Enough |
| "Love Just Ain't Enough" | 2018 | — | Love Just Ain't Enough |
| "All or Nothing" | 2018 | — | Love Just Ain't Enough |
| "Gullible" | 2018 | — | Love Just Ain't Enough |
| "L Word" | 2018 | — | Love Just Ain't Enough |
| "Selfish" | 2018 | — | Love Just Ain't Enough |
| "Move" | 2018 | — | Non-album singles |
| "My Love Is Your Love" | 2018 | 93 | Non-album singles |
| "Lose My Love" | 2019 | — | No Logic |
| "Opposite" | 2019 | — | No Logic |
| "Caught Up" | 2019 | — | No Logic |
| "All Night Pt. 1" | 2019 | — | No Logic |
| "No Logic" | 2019 | — | No Logic |
| "Lay Your Blame" | 2019 | — | No Logic |
| "All Night Pt. II" | 2019 | — | No Logic |
| "Young Heart" (feat. Russ) | 2020 | — | State of Mine |
| "Close" | 2020 | — | State of Mine |
| "Trippin" | 2021 | — | State of Mine |
| "Sick of Me" | 2021 | — | State of Mine |
| "2nd Nature" | 2021 | — | State of Mine |
| "Motive" | 2021 | — | State of Mine |
| "Over You" (feat. Toni Ramiti) | 2021 | — | State of Mine |
| "Twisted Fantasy" | 2021 | — | Non-album singles |
| "Can't Help Falling in Love" | 2023 | — | Non-album singles |
| "I Got Problems" | 2023 | — | Non-album singles |
| "Hyperfocused" | 2024 | — | Non-album singles |
| "Wild, Young & Free" | 2024 | 30 | Non-album singles |
| "Wasteman" | 2024 | 17 | Non-album singles |
| "Love You Left Behind" | 2024 | 62 | Non-album singles |
| "Love Bomb" | 2025 | 19 | Non-album singles |
| "Nun Club" | 2027 | — | Non-album singles |
"—" denotes a recording that did not chart or was not released in that territory.

==== As featured artist ====
List of singles as a featured artist, showing year released and album name
| Title | Year | Album |
|---|---|---|
| "Changes" (Nitin Sawhney featuring Kara Marni) | 2018 | Non-album singles |
| "On My Way" (Professor Green featuring Zdot and Kara Marni) | 2025 | Non-album singles |
