= Budde =

Budde is a surname of German origin. Notable people with the surname include:

- Brad Budde (b. 1958), American professional football player
- Christoph Budde (1963–2009), German football player
- Ed Budde (1940–2023), American professional football player
- Elmar Budde (1935–2025), German musicologist
- Gustav Henrik Andreas Budde-Lund (1846–1911), Danish zoologist
- Jonas Budde (1644–1710), Danish-Norwegian army officer
- Jöns Budde (c. 1435–1495), Finnish Franciscan friar
- Kai Budde (1979–2026), German professional Magic: The Gathering player
- Karl Budde (1850–1935), German theologian
- Katrin Budde (b. 1965), German politician
- Mariann Budde (b. 1959), diocesan bishop of the Episcopal Diocese of Washington, D.C.
- Ryan Budde (b. 1979), American professional baseball player
- Theo Budde (1889–1959), Dutch jeweller, preservationist, and poet
- Vincens Budde (1660–1729), Norwegian army officer
