= Felix Howard =

Songwriter, record producer, and publisher (born 1973)

- Born: 14 January 1973 (age 53)
- Occupations: Songwriter, producer, A&R and publisher
- Years active: 1985–present
- Spouse: Andrea Lewis (m. 2021)
- Children: 2

Felix Howard (born 14 January 1973) is a British songwriter, record producer, A&R and publisher.

== Early life ==
Howard's father was music agent Anthony "Tony" Howard, whose aunt was married to trumpeter Eddie Calvert.

A model as a child, Felix Howard was photographed by Jamie Morgan and styled by Ray Petri for the cover of The Face magazine. During the 1980s, Howard appeared in music videos for several singles, including Sting's "Russians" in 1985, Madonna's "Open Your Heart" in 1986. Howard also appeared in the Mantronix video for "Got to Have Your Love" and in the Nick Kamen video for "Each Time You Break My Heart".

== Career ==
His songwriting credits include working alongside Amy Winehouse, Sia, The Sugababes among many others. In 2007, he joined EMI Publishing as an A&R manager and signed Calvin Harris, Lana Del Rey, MNEK, James Vincent McMorrow, Tinchy Stryder, Sam Sparro, Hurts, Beverley Knight, Tom Jones, and many others.

In 2008, Howard was made VP, A&R at EMI and in 2009 he was made head of A&R EMI UK and Europe Creative.

After leaving EMI before the Sony merger, Howard went on to consult for Daniel Lieberberg at Universal Records and was involved with the Klangkarussell album and signed Lewis Capaldi with Lieberberg.

Previously, Howard was director of A&R for the US division of Budde Publishing in Los Angeles. He worked at Method Management in an A&R role. In December 2020, Howard joined BMG as director A&R (New Recordings) in London. At BMG, Howard worked with Gabrielle, Ultra Nate, Katie Melua, Louis Tomlinson, Zak Abel and Lady Blackbird. He joined Kassner Music Publishing in 2025 as Head of A&R.

== Personal life ==
As a child, Howard had systemic-onset juvenile idiopathic arthritis and was a patient at Great Ormond Street Hospital under Barbara Ansell. He has vitiligo and what he has called "a number of extremely tiresome and dull auto immune illnesses". Howard has two children. He has said that the musician Roy Harper is his children's "biological grandfather". He supports Chelsea FC.

== Selected discography ==
=== Songwriting credits ===
Year	Artist	Song	Album	Notes
2000	Sugababes	"Overload"	One Touch	
2002	Sugababes	"Stronger"	Angels with Dirty Faces	
2002	Sia	'Blow it All Away"	Healing Is Difficult	
2002	Holly Valance	"Hush Now"	Footprints	
2003	Sugababes	"Million Different Ways"	Three	
2003	Sugababes	"In the Middle'	Three	
2003	Lene	"Up in Smoke"	Play with Me	
2003	Amy Winehouse	"You Sent Me Flying"/"Cherry"	Frank	Also backing vocals, producer, engineer
2003	Kylie Minogue	"You Make Me Feel"	Body Language	
2004	Sia	"Numb"	Colour the Small One	Also guitar
2004	Beverley Knight	"Straight Jacket"	Affirmation	
2006	Amy Winehouse	"Close to the Front"	Back to Black	
