= Siobhán Donaghy =

British singer and songwriter (born 1984)

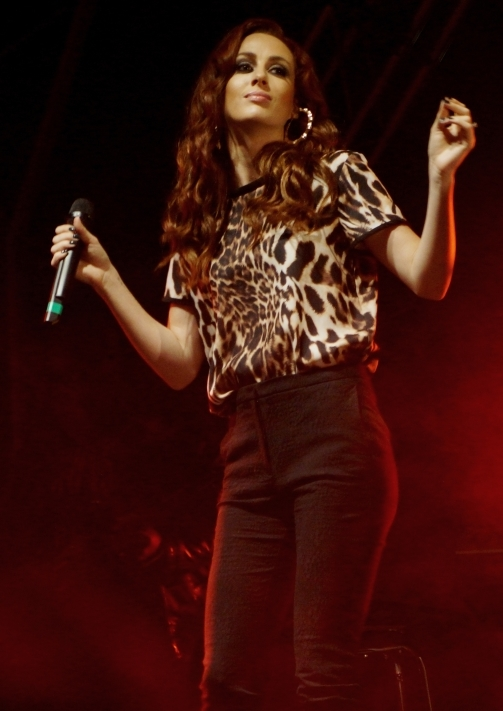
- Donaghy performing in 2013
- Born: Siobhán Emma Donaghy; 14 June 1984 (age 42); Eastcote, London, England
- Occupations: Singer; songwriter
- Years active: 1998–present
- Spouse: Chris McCoy (m. 2013)
- Children: 2
- Musical career
- Genres: R&B; pop; electropop; trip hop
- Instrument: Vocals
- Labels: London; Polydor; Parlophone
- Member of: Sugababes

Siobhán Emma Donaghy (born 14 June 1984) is a British singer and songwriter best known as a founding member of the girl group Sugababes. Donaghy left Sugababes in 2001 and released her debut solo album, Revolution in Me, in 2003. Her second studio album, Ghosts, was released in 2007 and met critical acclaim.

In 2012, Donaghy and her former colleagues Mutya Buena and Keisha Buchanan confirmed their reunion. The original trio were not able to release music under the name Sugababes as it was still owned by the management company. They instead released music under the new name Mutya Keisha Siobhan, until they secured the legal rights to the Sugababes name again in 2019.

== Early life ==
Siobhán Emma Donaghy was born on 14 June 1984 in Eastcote to Irish parents and has two sisters, Beibhinn and Róisín. The latter works as her make-up artist.

== Career ==
=== 1997–2001: Early career and Sugababes ===
Donaghy signed her first management contract at age 12 with Ron Tom, who at the time also managed British group All Saints. Donaghy said she was unsure if she wanted to be a singer at this point. Although her mother was supportive, her father was hesitant about his 12-year-old daughter signing contracts in the music industry. Soon after, Tom also signed Mutya Buena as a solo artist, and the pair performed an a cappella concert together at an industry showcase. Donaghy and Buena later began recording music together with British producer Don-E, with Buena eventually inviting her friend Keisha Buchanan to a recording session. Tom suggested the trio form a band called Sugababes. He paired the group together after likening their appearance to a commercial campaign from Italian fashion brand Benetton, noting the different ethnicity of each member.

Sugababes signed to London Records, and Donaghy was 16 when their first single, "Overload", was released in 2000. The song was nominated for a Brit Award for British Single of the Year, sold over 231,000 copies in the UK as of 2021, and was a top five hit on several international charts. Their debut album, One Touch, was primarily produced by Cameron McVey, and was certified gold by the British Phonographic Industry, selling over 226,000 in the UK. The album produced three more top thirty singles in the UK: "New Year", "Run for Cover" and "Soul Sound".

"It was just never good. Right from the start. We just didn't get on. We ignored each other and went about our business. It was very much a working relationship and we couldn't even work at that. You know all those photos of us refusing to smile? I was just really unhappy and I couldn't be arsed."

— Donaghy on her working relationship with Sugababes member Keisha Buchanan, in an interview with The Guardian in 2003.

Tensions between Donaghy and her colleagues were reported by numerous publications over the course of the promotional tour for One Touch. Donaghy said she and Buchanan "had nothing in common at all, and we went on not to get on. She was Mutya's friend, so I ended up being the odd one out." Buchanan and Buena reportedly invented their own coded language to exclude Donaghy from conversations, and allegedly bullied her out of the group. Donaghy refused to comment on these details, "because people know what happened". She acrimoniously exited Sugababes in August 2001 during a tour of Japan. According to the group, Donaghy "excused herself to go to the toilet" and never returned, instead flying back to her home in England; Donaghy said she and Buchanan had a "falling out" while in Japan. She later said she was "pushed out" of the group and accused Buchanan of bullying, saying: "It was clear that there was someone in that band who never wanted me in it and that's Keisha. She never wanted me in that band and made my life a living hell."

Buchanan has denied all accusations of bullying other members of Sugababes. She and Buena described a culture of intimidation within the group instigated by their former manager and a producer.

=== 2001–2003: Revolution in Me ===
Following her departure from Sugababes, Donaghy said she had panic attacks and a nervous breakdown, saying she would have been "happy never to work again." She was prescribed anti-depressants, and was diagnosed with clinical depression. London Records dropped the band but opted to retain Donaghy's contract as a solo artist. The band's manager, Ron Tom, then sued Donaghy for breach of contract. She said she spent all the money she earned as a member of the band fighting the lawsuit. Several months later, Donaghy embarked on a holiday to Ibiza where she coincidentally met Johnny Lipsey, the producer who had created several tracks on One Touch. Lipsey reintroduced Donaghy to Cameron McVey, who invited her to record at his home studio in Eastcote. Around this time, Sugababes replaced Donaghy with former Atomic Kitten singer Heidi Range and had a UK number one single with "Freak like Me". Donaghy said: "If I'd still been in that band, I wouldn't have given a fuck that I was number one."

McVey suggested to Donaghy that writing new material could be therapeutic, and she began composing material alongside a new team of songwriters. Prior to the release of any material, she performed a series of concerts under the alias Shanghai Nobody, an anagram of her name, including a performance at Dublin Castle in Camden Town. "Nothing but Song" was released as a white label promotional 7" vinyl single in March 2003. For the release of her first commercial single in June, "Overrated", she reverted to her given name. The song was a top twenty hit on the UK Singles Chart, peaking at number 19. Her second single, "Twist of Fate", followed in September, peaking at number 52 in the UK.

Her debut album, Revolution in Me, was released on 29 September 2003. Several of its songs contain lyrics dealing with Donaghy's time as a member of Sugababes, and incorporate lyrical themes of predestination, alienation, exploring life, and searching for support. The album was primarily produced by McVey, his son Marlon McVey, and Marlon's Mattafix bandmate Preetesh Hirji. It also features production contributions from Matt Kent, Silvio Pacini, Neil Pearson, and Jody Street. The album peaked at number 117 on the UK Albums Chart. "Iodine" was scheduled to be released as the album's third single in December. However, Donaghy parted ways with London Records soon after the album was issued, alongside most of her previous collaborators, who left the label soon after it was absorbed by Warner Music Group. "Iodine" was instead released as a free download on her website, where she announced she was working on her second studio album independently.

=== 2005–2010: Ghosts and Rent Remixed ===
In 2005, Donaghy appeared as a vocalist on the Mattafix album Signs of a Struggle, and on the Morcheeba album The Antidote. That same year, she worked with producer James Sanger at his villa in northern France on material for her second album. His mother died prior to production, and he had developed an addition to heroin. However, Donaghy said these issues helped make the material more emotive. Sanger entered drug rehabilitation twice during the album's recording. Upon completion, Donaghy commended his sobriety, saying he has "completely changed his life now". She also praised him for inspiring her to become a better musician, saying he taught her how to play keyboard instruments and synthesizers such as the Electribe, Nord Lead 3, Moog, and Rhodes.

Ghosts was released in June 2007. Donaghy and Sanger recorded five of its songs before she was signed to a record deal. Parlophone financed the completion of the record when she signed with the label in 2006. The album features additional production from Marius de Vries. Its lyrics deal with themes of depression, independence, lost love, and survival. Floria Sigismondi created the album cover. She and Donaghy discussed concepts for the artwork for several months. The photoshoots took place at a disused theatre in Los Angeles, and required a crew of 100 people. Ghosts was preceded by the title track and "Don't Give It Up" as a two-track 12-inch promotional single in February. The latter song was given a wider release as the lead single in April, and peaked at number 45 in the UK. The second single, "So You Say", was released in June 2007, and peaked at number 76. Both songs peaked within the top forty of the Scottish Singles Chart.

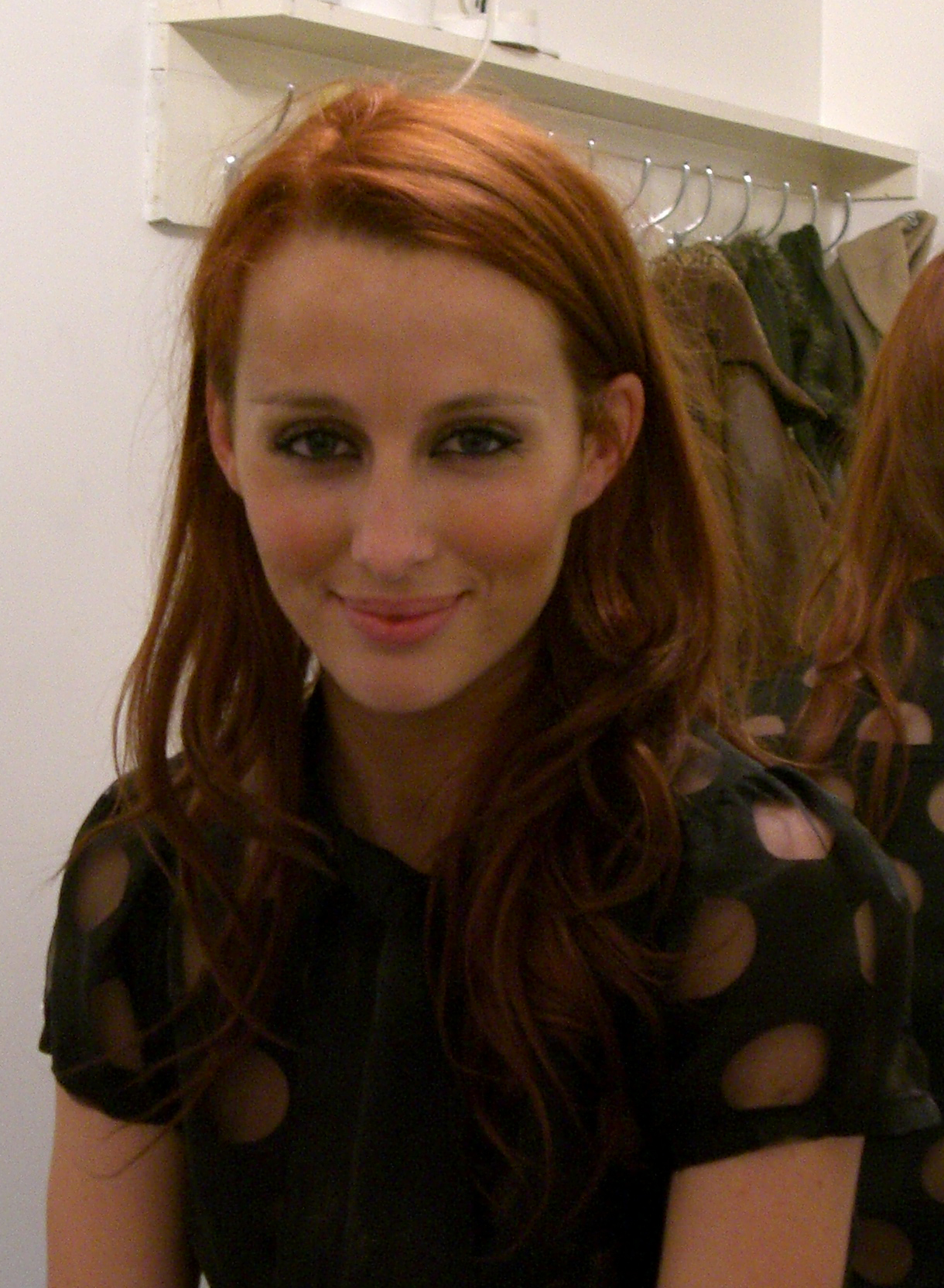
Donaghy backstage at Rent Remixed in 2007

The album peaked at number 92 in the UK. Physical copies of Ghosts suffered from a manufacturing error; another musician's work was mistakenly printed on CD versions of the album. Donaghy said this error impacted the record's commercial performance, as stores immediately withdrew it from circulation when customers informed them of the error and refused to restock it when the issue was corrected several weeks later. Sanger said its commercial performance was also hampered by "bad timing", noting its release coincided with a hostile takeover of EMI by Guy Hands. He said the takeover caused a "crisis of leadership in the whole EMI group of companies, including Parlophone Records."

Donaghy joined the cast of Rent Remixed less than two months after Ghosts was released. A new version of Rent created by William Baker and Steve Anderson, the production ran at the Duke of York's Theatre in London's West End from October 2007, closing the following February. She postponed a tour and turned down work commitments related to Ghosts in order to join the production, where she portrayed Mimi.

In a January 2009 interview with We7, Donaghy said she would not release another solo album. She said: "At this point in time I have no further plans to undertake another record of my own. Ultimately, the true nature of the business side of the music industry is enough to keep me away. Nonetheless, if I find myself in the future bursting with ideas and experiences I feel the need to share through music, I will be back." In June 2009, she featured on the Square1 single "Styfling", which was produced by Revolution in Me collaborator Silvio Pacini. Later that year, she said she "had the break" she wanted from the industry and was currently working on new music, but was unsure when it would be finished. She contributed vocals to "Sounds Like a Plan", a song on This Day: World Hepatitis Day, a charity album released on May 19, 2010, in aid of World Hepatitis Day. The song was recorded with Cameron McVey's band CirKus, which also features his wife Neneh Cherry.

=== 2010–2016: Forming Mutya Keisha Siobhan ===
In March 2010, it was reported Donaghy's former colleague Mutya Buena was pursuing legal rights to the Sugababes name. Buena was doing it by herself and only listed Donaghy's and Buchanan's names on the documentation to register the Sugababes name with the European Union's trademark office OHIM.

In October 2011, several news outlets reported the original line-up of Sugababes would reform. In January 2012, further circulations that the group would reunite were sparked, after both Buena and Buchanan tweeted that they were in the studio with "two other females" and British rapper Professor Green. However, Buena later denied this on Twitter, saying: "No track [with] keisha or professor G he was around tha studio. im jus workin on my stuff @ tha moment. (sic)" Despite this, Scottish singer-songwriter Emeli Sandé confirmed to MTV UK that she had written new songs for Buena, Buchanan and Donaghy, saying: "Yes, that is true. I've written for the original line-up of the Sugababes, which I'm very happy about because I just loved them when they first came out. I loved their sound, it was so cool. It was very different, so I'm happy to kind of be involved in what started the whole Sugababes journey. It sounds amazing." In April 2012, it was reported that the line-up had signed a £1 million record real with Polydor Records. In June 2012, Donaghy confirmed on Twitter that new music would be released, saying: "the soonest it'll be is in 2 weeks. The latest is 10 weeks."

In July 2012, it was officially confirmed the group had re-formed under the name Mutya Keisha Siobhan and were writing songs for a new album under Polydor. The group attended the 2012 Summer Olympics opening ceremony on 27 July 2012 and posted pictures on their official Instagram page, marking Buena, Buchanan and Donaghy's first public appearance together in 11 years. On 6 August the group confirmed they had written two songs with Shaznay Lewis, former member of All Saints. The next day, Siobhan Donaghy tweeted "With the girls in the studio. I think the album is finished!!!" before adding "Whoop!" In an interview with Popjustice in August 2012 Donaghy stated she had no interest in releasing any more solo material, saying she felt her 2007 album Ghosts was her best work and did not see why she needed to release any more material and that she was completely focused on MKS. An album was confirmed by Donaghy in 2016 to be released in early 2017, however this never materialised.

=== 2019–present: Touring and The Lost Tapes ===
In February 2019, Mutya Buena confirmed a leak of the demos resulted in the album being postponed. Donaghy has a writing credit on the Bananarama song "Love in Stereo" along with Keisha Buchanan, a song originally written for the Mutya Keisha Siobhan album. In August 2019, Donaghy, Buena and Buchanan reunited for a cover of Sweet Female Attitude's "Flowers", produced by DJ Spoony, as part of his album Garage Classical. The trio is credited as Sugababes, making it the first time since 2001 that Donaghy had performed under the name. Sugababes headlined the second day of June 2022's "Mighty Hoopla" festival in Herne Hill, London. On 20 May 2022, it was announced the band would be supporting Westlife on their Dublin leg. They will make a number of further appearances at music festivals over the summer, including Glastonbury, Portsmouth's Victorious Festival and the Margate Pride Festival.

On 3 June 2022, the 2013 Mutya Keisha Siobhan single "Flatline" was re-released under the Sugababes name. Sugababes announced their 17-date headlining tour, their first tour in nine years, on 23 June 2022, starting on 16 October 2022 in Bristol and concluding on 7 November 2022 in Glasgow. In October 2022, it was announced that the band would support Take That at BST Hyde Park on 1 July 2023 alongside The Script. They later released The Lost Tapes, an album consisting of previously unreleased material. In March 2023, Donaghy appeared as a special guest on 'Spinning Plates', a podcast series presented by Sophie Ellis Bextor.

On 8 December 2023, a 20th-anniversary edition of Revolution in Me was released with a vinyl pressing for the first time. The release was preceded by the release of an album out-take, "Pop Illusion", as a promotional single.

== Personal life ==
From 2006 to 2011 she worked as a model booker in London.

Donaghy married Chris McCoy in 2013. They have a son, born in 2017. and a daughter, born in 2020. She is a cousin of Irish Gaelic footballer player, Kieran Donaghy.

== Discography ==
- Revolution in Me (2003)
- Ghosts (2007)

== Tours ==
=== Sugababes ===
- Sacred Three Tour (2013)
- Sugababes UK Tour (2022)
- Sugababes Australian Tour (2023)
- Sugababes Australian Tour (2024)
- Sugababes 25 (2025)

=== Other shows ===
- One Night Only at the O2 (2023)
- Parklife (2024)

=== Supporting act ===
- Westlife – The Wild Dreams Tour (2022)
- Take That – Live at Hyde Park (2023)

== Awards and nominations ==
Award	Year	Category	Nominee(s)	Result	Ref.
Brit Awards	2001	British Single of the Year	"Overload"	Nominated	
Capital FM's Awards	2001	Best Kept Secret	Sugababes	Won	
NME Awards	2001	Best R&B/Soul Act	Sugababes	Nominated	
Popjustice £20 Music Prize	2013	Best British Pop Single	"Flatline"	Nominated	
Smash Hits Poll Winners Party	2000	Best New Band	Sugababes	Nominated	

== Theatre appearances ==
Year	Production	Role	Theatre
2007 / 2008	Rent	Mimi	Duke of York's Theatre, London
