= Charlotte Gordon Cumming =

British musician

- Born: Charlotte Gordon Cumming; 2 February 1958 (age 68); Scotland
- Occupation: Musician
- Spouse: Nicholas Evans
- Children: 2

Charlotte Gordon Cumming (born 2 February 1958) is a British contemporary singer-songwriter and music producer. She wrote the Sugababes hit "Soul Sound", which was nominated for the MTV Best European Single Award in 2001. In 2005, the song was covered by Indonesian singer Joy Tobing on her album Rise and was recorded by Cumming on her album Mindwalking.

Cumming is the daughter of clan chief Sir William Gordon-Cumming, 6th Baronet, and Elizabeth, daughter of Major General (William) Robert Norris Hinde.

Cumming is influenced by artists such as Paul Simon, Peter Gabriel and Sinéad O'Connor, though she has developed her own modern blend of Celtic melodies and African rhythms.

In 1984, she married Michael Edwards and was later married to novelist Nicholas Evans, author of The Horse Whisperer, until his death in August 2022.

In September 2008, while at her brother's estate in Forres, Moray, Cumming, her husband, her brother, and her sister-in-law ate poisonous Cortinarius speciosissimus mushrooms, which had been misidentified as an edible species. Several of the group experienced kidney failure as a result. Cumming remained on kidney dialysis while seeking alternative medicine treatments until 2012 when she had a kidney transplant.
