= Lakota (club) =

Nightclub in Bristol, England

Coordinates: 51.46319°N 2.58952°W

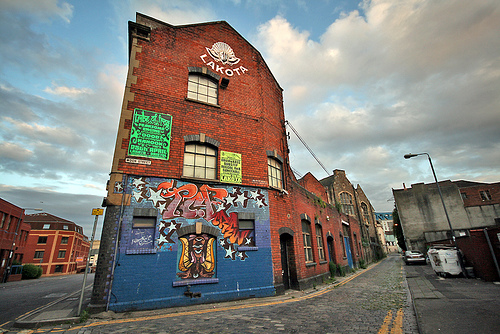
The Lakota nightclub and Moon Street.

Lakota is a nightclub situated off Stokes Croft, Bristol. The building is the only remaining part of the Stokes Croft Brewery and is part of the Stokes Croft Conservation Area. It is considered to be a local landmark by the Bristol City Council and was "once deemed in the early nineties as one of the most famous clubs in the country outside London".

== History ==
Lakota was initially set up by George Leonards and Martin Woolford, aka Merv, who also owned the Moon Club, which had been on the part of the site since 1986. The Burgess family owned the Tropic Club, which was situated on Stokes Croft. The club opened in 1989 and was immediately critically acclaimed. In 1990 the bank decided to call in receivers to sell the club as the mortgage rate rose to 15% and the club couldn't meet the repayments. Bentleigh and Marti Burgess decided to raise the money to purchase the clubs from the receivers. After a fierce bidding war between them and Piers Adams (of Mahiki - celebrity hangout) and Christian Arden (of Po-na-na), they eventually purchased the club using money they had raised from venture capitalists.

During the late nineties, Lakota became one of the country's most famous clubs, and the Burgess family expanded the empire to include a record company, merchandise shop and DJ agency. Lakota firmly put Bristol on the clubbing map as a thriving centre for club culture and helped move the city on from its reputation as a laidback city of 'mellow vibes'. Lakota hosted all the Superstar DJs, such as Carl Cox, Danny Rampling, Sasha, John Digweed, Todd Terry, Roger Sanchez, Paul Oakenfold, Judge Jules and LTJ Bukem.

At the turn of the century, Lakota, like all of the other superclubs, suffered from a massive drop in trade and over the next few years, it seemed to lose its way as it tried to stick to its house roots as well as dabble with new and other underground music such as a garage, reggae and two-step. Since 2006 the club has regained ground by collaborating with young promoters to put on a series of drum and bass, hardcore, dub-step, psytrance and techno nights. A new generation of Bristol clubbers seems to have fallen in love with it again.

Lakota again gained national publicity in March 2008 when plans were announced to demolish it and nearby club Clockwork. A Facebook campaign was launched to save it, and over 7,000 clubbers joined this campaign and made a heroic appeal. However, their efforts planning permission was granted by Bristol City Council. Lakota was set to be demolished in early 2011, and in its place, a small bar and restaurant were planned as part of the planned development. However, due to negative public reactions and petitions, it was decided it would carry on running as a nightclub venue.
