= Keisha Buchanan =

British singer and songwriter (born 1984)

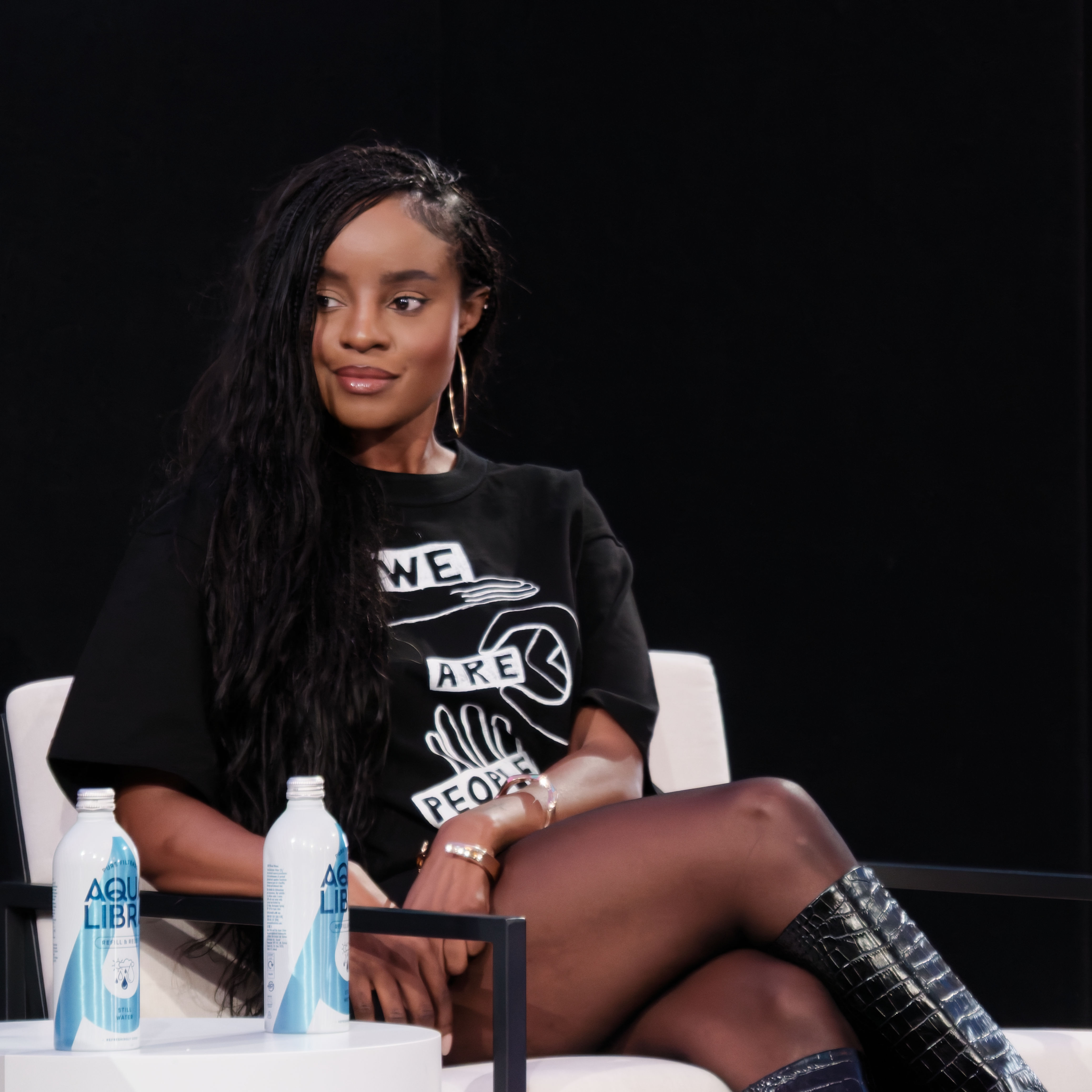
- Buchanan in 2026
- Born: Keisha Kerreece Fayeanne Buchanan; 30 September 1984 (age 41); Westminster, London, England
- Occupations: Singer; songwriter
- Years active: 1998–present
- Musical career
- Genres: Pop; R&B
- Instrument: Vocals
- Label: London Records Polydor Parlophone Roc Nation
- Member of: Sugababes

Keisha Kerreece Fayeanne Buchanan (/ˈkiːʃə/ KEE-shə; born 30 September 1984) is a British singer and songwriter and a founding member of the girl group Sugababes alongside Mutya Buena and Siobhán Donaghy. With Sugababes, she has had six number-one singles and two number-one studio albums, making them one of the most successful-charting British pop acts of the 21st century. Buchanan was fired from the group in September 2009 and was replaced by Jade Ewen, but returned to the group in 2012 with the original line-up.

In 2012, she and her former Sugababes bandmates Buena and Donaghy confirmed their reunion. The original trio was not able to release music under the name Sugababes as it was still being used by the then-current members of the group. Instead they released music under the name Mutya Keisha Siobhan before securing the legal rights to the Sugababes name in 2019. In 2026, she won the seventh series of The Masked Singer.

== Early life ==
Keisha Kerreece Fayeanne Buchanan was born on 30 September 1984 in Westminster, to parents of Jamaican descent. She first met and befriended future Sugababes member Mutya Buena in primary school. She recognised her from an appearance on a talent contest TV show presented by Michael Barrymore. The two also attended Kingsbury High School together. Buchanan is a Christian.

== Career ==
=== 1998–2009: Sugababes ===
In May 1998, Siobhán Donaghy and Mutya Buena, both aged 13, had been signed as solo artists, but decided to work together after performing at the same showcase. While working in the studio, Buena invited her best friend Keisha Buchanan to watch them. Manager Tom decided the three girls were to be a trio, likening their different appearances to the United Colors of Benetton campaign. Originally dubbed The Sugababies, the group tweaked its name to Sugababes when signed by London Records to give a more mature image.

The group's debut single, "Overload", peaked at number 6 on the UK Singles Chart in 2000 and was nominated for a BRIT Award for Best Single. The group co-wrote most of the tracks on debut album One Touch with the help of All Saints producer Cameron McVey. One Touch peaked at number 26 on the UK Albums Chart. The album produced three more top-40 hits—"New Year", "Run for Cover" and "Soul Sound". The sales of One Touch did not meet London Records' expectations, and they dropped the group in 2001. The album was later certified gold by the BPI and had sold 220,000 copies in the UK by 2008 according to Music Week.

During a Japanese promotional tour in August 2001, Donaghy left the group. She stated initially she wanted to pursue a fashion career, but was eventually diagnosed with clinical depression amid reports of in-fighting amongst the group's members. Donaghy later stated she was forced out of the group by Buchanan and called Buchanan the "first bully" in her life. Former Atomic Kitten member Heidi Range was announced as Donaghy's replacement.

Having already started work on a second album with new member Range, the trio looked for a new record label, eventually signing to Island Records. Their first single on the new label, "Freak like Me", scored the group their first UK number 1 single. Follow-up single "Round Round" also debuted on top of the UK Singles Chart and peaked at number 2 in Ireland, the Netherlands and New Zealand. Both singles were certified silver by the BPI. On the back of the success of the singles, the group's second album, Angels with Dirty Faces, debuted at number 2 on the UK Albums Chart and was later certified triple platinum, selling almost a million copies in the UK alone. It is to date their highest-selling album. In the UK, the third single from the album, a ballad titled "Stronger", gained the girls their third consecutive top ten hit in their native country. The track was released as a double-A side with "Angels with Dirty Faces" in the UK, the latter song chosen as the theme tune to The Powerpuff Girls Movie. A fourth single, the Sting-sampling "Shape", made the top ten in the Netherlands and Ireland in early 2003.

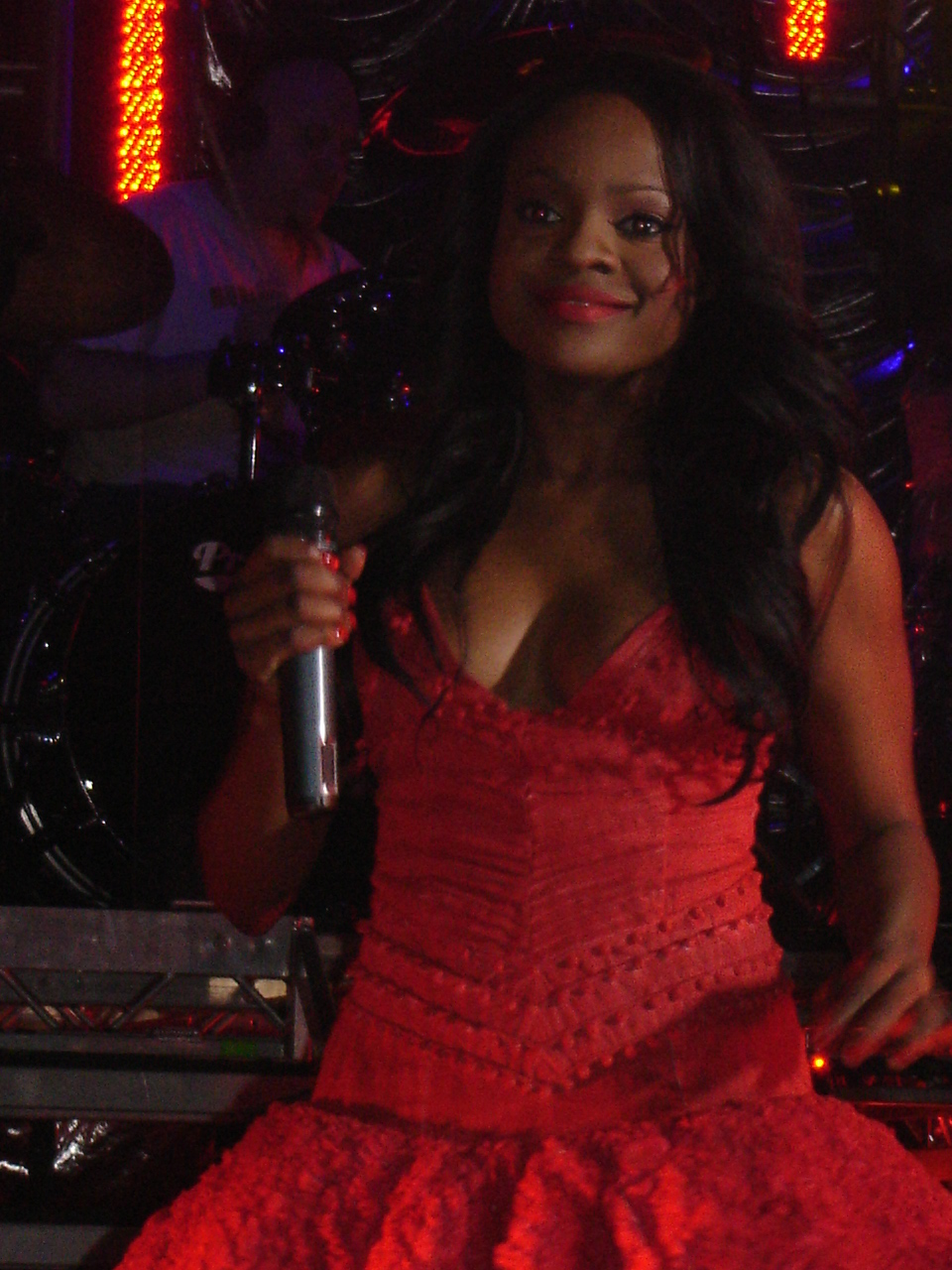
Buchanan performing at the Hammersmith Apollo in April 2005

The group's third album, Three, was released in late 2003 and reached number 3 on the UK Albums Chart, earning the group a BRIT Award nomination for Best Album. Certified double platinum, it has sold 855,000 copies to date. The album was preceded by lead single "Hole in the Head", which became the group's third UK number 1 single. It also reached number 2 in Ireland, the Netherlands and Norway, and became the Sugababes' first (and to date only) single to chart in the United States, reaching number 96 on the Billboard Hot 100. Follow-up single "Too Lost in You" appeared on the soundtrack to the film Love Actually and went top ten in Germany, the Netherlands, Norway and the UK. The album's third single, "In the Middle", was released in 2004 and garnered the group another BRIT Award nomination for Best Single; like its successor, the ballad "Caught in a Moment", it went to number 8 on the UK Singles Chart. In 2004, the trio sang on Band Aid 20's remake of "Do They Know It's Christmas?", which went to number 1 in the UK in December.

Around this time, the group's perceived "moodiness", alleged backstage catfights, and press junket tantrums were tabloid fodder in Britain. They were surrounded by continuous rumours of in-fighting within the group and constant split reports. Rumours suggested that Buchanan and Buena had bullied Range, although Range herself repeatedly denied such allegations; Buena later admitted that she "just didn't talk to her" when she first joined. Buchanan claimed there was only one serious fallout between herself and Range during a 2004 gig in Dublin, regarding Britney Spears' "Toxic".

After a hiatus, the Sugababes released their thirteenth single, "Push the Button", in October 2005. The song debuted at number 1 in the UK and remained in the position for three consecutive weeks. It also peaked at number one in Ireland, Austria and New Zealand, and reached the top three across Europe and in Australia. Certified silver in the UK, it was later nominated at the BRIT Awards for Best Single. Parent album Taller in More Ways became the group's first UK number 1 album. The group was number 1 on the singles, album, airplay and download charts simultaneously, making them the first girl group to achieve such a feat. Taller in More Ways was certified double platinum in the UK.

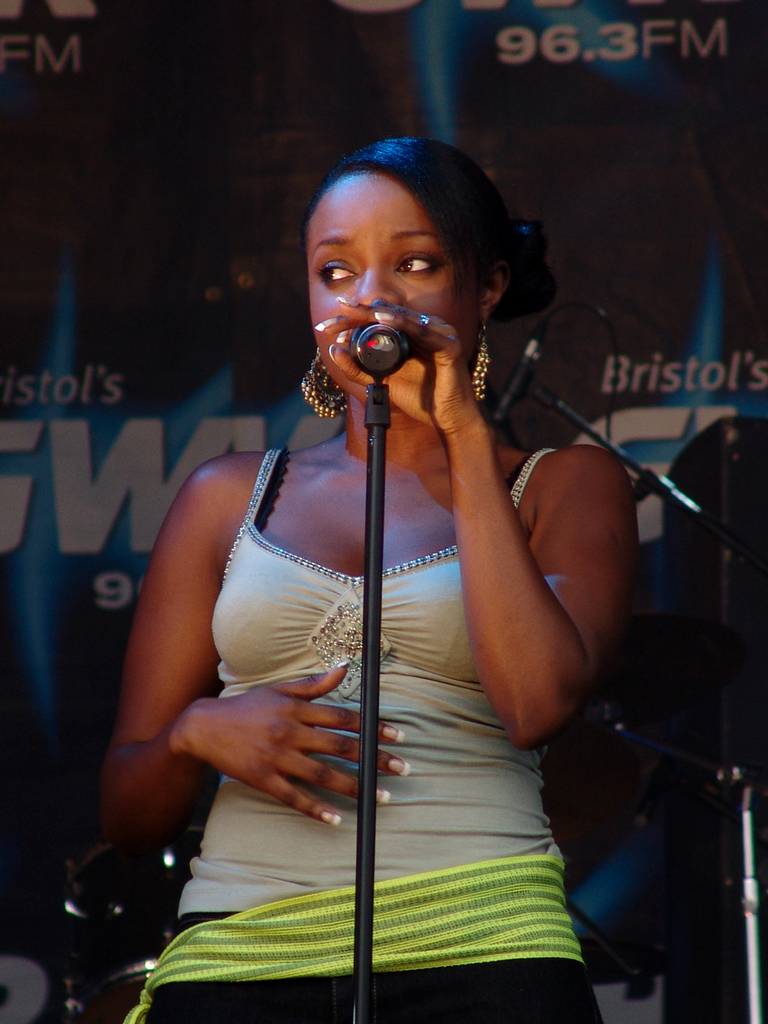
Buchanan performing with the second-line up of the Sugababes

Following an apparent illness that prevented Buena from promoting follow-up single "Ugly", it was announced on 21 December 2005 that Buena had left Sugababes. According to an announcement on their official website, Buena's decision was based purely on personal reasons following the birth of her daughter. Amelle Berrabah joined the Sugababes in late December 2005, having been chosen by the group's management to replace Buena.

The third single from Taller in More Ways was a re-recorded version of "Red Dress", which was released in early 2006, and gave Sugababes their third consecutive top-five hit from the album, entering the UK Singles Chart at number 4. Berrabah re-recorded three of the album's twelve tracks and co-wrote a new song with Buchanan and Range named "Now You're Gone". The tracks appeared on a re-release of Taller in More Ways that reached number 18 on the UK Albums Chart. The fourth and final single from Taller in More Ways was "Follow Me Home", released only in the UK in June, where it charted at number 32.

In mid-2006, the group recorded two new tracks for their first greatest hits collection, titled Overloaded: The Singles Collection. The lead single from the compilation, "Easy", peaked at number 8 on the UK Singles Chart, whilst the compilation album, released in November 2006, peaked at number 3. The album, certified platinum by the BPI, has sold 598,000 copies. In March 2007, Sugababes collaborated with fellow British girl group Girls Aloud for their eighteenth single, a cover of the song "Walk This Way" by Aerosmith. The track was released as the official single for Comic Relief. "Walk This Way" became the group's fifth UK number-one single.

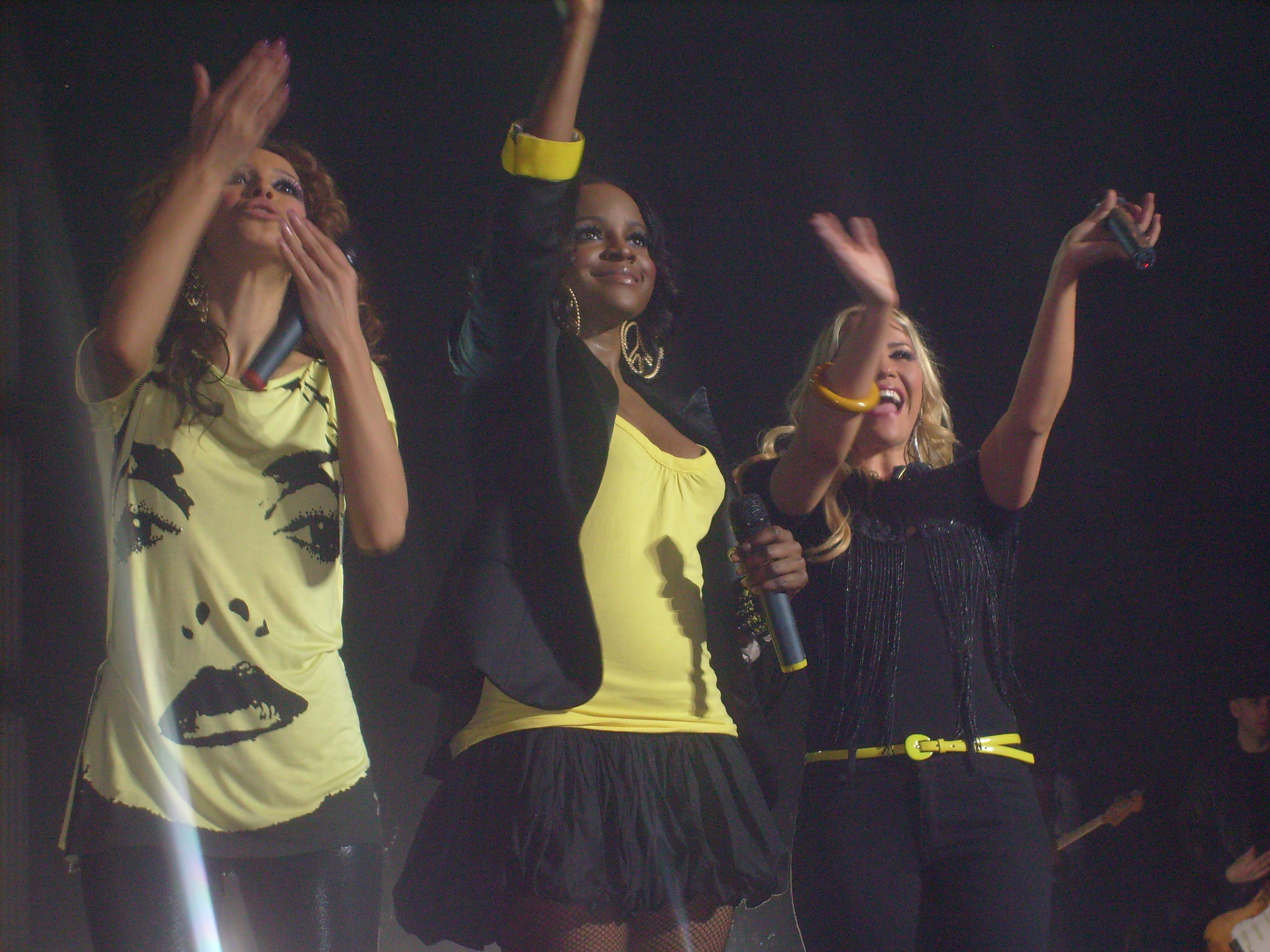
Buchanan performing with the third Sugababes line-up on the Change Tour in April 2008, their largest scale tour to date.

Following their Greatest Hits Tour, Sugababes released Change, their fifth studio album and the first to feature Berrabah on all tracks. "About You Now" was released as the album's lead single in September 2007. The song became the group's sixth UK number-one hit and first Hungarian chart-topper. It remained atop the UK Singles Chart for four weeks. "About You Now" was nominated for a 2008 BRIT Award for Best British Single and is to date their highest-selling single, with sales standing at almost 500,000 copies. In the 2009 edition of the Guinness Book of World Records, "About You Now" was listed as the "first track by a British pop act to top the singles chart solely on downloads". The song was also named as the "biggest chart mover to the number one position in the UK".

In October 2007, Change became the group's second UK number-one album. For the second time, the group topped the singles, album and download charts simultaneously. The album's title track "Change" was released as the second single in December 2007 and peaked at number 13 in the UK. The album sold 494,000 copies in the UK and was certified platinum. The third and final single from Change was "Denial", which reached number 15. From March to May 2008, Sugababes travelled the UK on the 30-show Change Tour, their biggest tour to date.

Following the Change Tour, Sugababes returned to the studio to write and record tracks for their sixth studio album, Catfights and Spotlights. It was reported producer Timbaland had approached Sugababes to work on their sixth album, but, due to time restrictions, a collaboration did not occur. "Girls", the lead single from Catfights and Spotlights, was released in October 2008. The single peaked at number 3 in the UK, making it their first lead single since One Touch not to reach number 1. The album peaked at number 8 in the UK Albums Chart. Its second and final single, "No Can Do", was released in December and peaked at number 23 in the UK. In January 2009, the Performing Right Society named Sugababes the fourth-hardest-working band of 2008 due to the number of concerts they had performed during that year.

After the release of "No Can Do", the group announced that there would be no 2009 tour in support of Catfights and Spotlights so they could focus on writing and recording material for their seventh studio album. Sugababes travelled to the United States to work on their seventh studio album, Sweet 7. In April 2009, Sugababes signed a contract with Jay-Z's label Roc Nation, resulting in working with high-profile producers. The lead single from Sweet 7, "Get Sexy", debuted at number 2 on the UK Singles Chart in September 2009.

On 21 September 2009, it was officially announced Buchanan had exited the group, resulting in Sugababes retaining none of its original members. Buchanan was replaced by former-Eurovision entrant Jade Ewen. Buchanan revealed on Twitter that it was not her decision to leave, resulting in some journalists describing her as having been "sacked".

I'm sad to say that I am no longer a part of the Sugababes ... Although it was not my choice to leave, it's time to enter a new chapter in my life ... I would like to state that there were no arguments, bullying or anything of the sort that lead [sic] to this. Sometimes a breakdown in communication and lack of trust can result in many different things.

— Keisha Buchanan, September 2009

Critics and fans reacted very negatively to the news, and British broadsheet The Guardian ran an article named "Why the Sugababes' show can't go on without Keisha". Digital Spy ran an article called "Keisha Buchanan, We Salute You" in which they thanked her for her contribution to "incredible pop songs". However, it has been claimed by Berrabah and Range that they played no role in the ousting of Buchanan. Both women have claimed to have quit Sugababes themselves only to find their group's management decided they would follow them, rather than find two new members for Buchanan.

On 1 July 2011, Buchanan approached the subsequent line-up of Sugababes at the Barclaycard Wireless festival in London, where the girls were reported to have a "tear-eyed" reunion and put the past behind them. It was the first time in two years that Buchanan had seen former bandmates Heidi Range and Amelle Berrabah. It was also the first time Buchanan had officially met her 'replacement' Jade Ewen.

=== 2009–2011: Solo career ===
She features on the song "Far Away" from Jay Sean's UK edition of All or Nothing. Following her departure from the Sugababes, Buchanan began recording her debut studio album. According to Newsbeat, the album had been mostly produced by Future Cut. American producer Dallas Austin, who largely contributed to Sugababes' fourth studio album, Taller in More Ways, was also confirmed to feature on the album. Buchanan revealed that she had recorded 50 tracks for the album as of August 2011. She stated during an interview for Newsbeat: "...there is no particular musical direction, it's just a vibe". During an interview for Metro, Buchanan explained what people could expect from the album, saying: "I wanted to showcase my vocals and I want to inspire people. It's a very honest album. Hopefully people will get to know me a bit more. There's a tongue-in-cheek vibe. It's got an international sound and I want my peers to like it. I don't want to hear myself on the radio and cringe, which can happen sometimes." Buchanan also revealed details about the album's sound and direction during an interview with Very, saying: "It's raw, it's fresh. I think a lot of people would be quite shocked. It's not the typical direction people might expect from me." The album was initially supposed to be released in 2011, however according to Buchanan, "every time we lock down there's always someone else who wants to work with me." In June 2011, Buchanan performed songs at Jacques Townhouse in London, which was her first solo performance. Buchanan also appeared in the video for D'banj's single "Oliver Twist" in April 2012. However, Buchanan later left Island Records to reunite with her former colleagues Siobhan and Mutya, so her solo album was shelved and cancelled.

=== 2011–2019: Mutya Keisha Siobhan ===
In October 2011, several news outlets reported the original line-up of Sugababes were going to re-form. In January 2012, further speculation that the group were going to reunite was sparked, after both Buena and Buchanan tweeted they were in the studio with "two other females" and British rapper Professor Green. However, Buena later denied this on Twitter, saying: "No track [with] keisha or professor G he was around tha studio. im jus workin on my stuff @ tha moment. (sic)" Despite this, Scottish singer-songwriter Emeli Sandé confirmed to MTV UK that she had written new songs for Buena, Buchanan and Donaghy, saying: "Yes, that is true. I've written for the original line-up of the Sugababes [sic], which I'm very happy about because I just loved them when they first came out. I loved their sound, it was so cool. It was very different, so I'm happy to kind of be involved in what started the whole Sugababes journey. It sounds amazing." In April 2012, it was reported the line-up had signed a £1 million record real with Polydor Records. In June 2012, Donaghy confirmed on Twitter that new music was going to be released, saying: "the soonest it'll be is in 2 weeks. The latest is 10 weeks."

In July 2012, the group reformed under the name Mutya Keisha Siobhan and were writing songs for a new album under Polydor. The group attended the 2012 Summer Olympics opening ceremony on 27 July 2012 and posted pictures on their official Instagram page, marked Buena's, Buchanan's and Donaghy's first public appearance together in eleven years. On 6 August the group confirmed they had written two songs with Shaznay Lewis, former member of All Saints. The next day, Siobhan Donaghy tweeted "With the girls in the studio. I think the album is finished!!!" before adding "Whoop!".

=== 2019–present: Touring and The Lost Tapes ===
Behind the scenes, the members of MKS worked to regain control of the Sugababes name. Buena gained some merchandising rights in 2011, and Buchanan registered the trademark in the U.S. in 2015. After winning full control, the group reformed under the Sugababes banner in 2019. They released the single "Flowers" in October 2019, a cover of the Sweet Female Attitude hit from 2000. "Flowers" was a collaboration between Sugababes and DJ Spoony, and was included on Spoony's album Garage Classical.

In May 2020, Buchanan launched her own vlogging channel on YouTube, speaking on her professional and personal experiences past and present.

During 2022, Buchanan appeared at various festivals with Sugababes, embarked on a headline tour and released The Lost Tapes, an album consisting of their 2013 single "Flatline" and previously unreleased material.

In December 2023, Buchanan took part in the 2023 Christmas Special of Strictly Come Dancing, partnering with Gorka Márquez. In 2026, Buchanan won the seventh series of The Masked Singer as "Moth".
