= Theo Budde =

Theo Cornelis Budde (28 August 1889 in Ootmarsum - 8 August 1959 ) was a watchmaker, jeweler and antique dealer, as well as a poet who left a legacy in his hometown.

Theo Budde was instrumental in establishing tourism in the well preserved medieval town of Ootmarsum. This remains the largest form of income for the local economy. He recognised the value of the old buildings, the original layout of the streets, and the many traditions that had survived the changing times. He was an active member of the Twensen Schrieversboond (the Twents writers guild). He loved Ootmarsum and wrote many poems about it.

As a watchmaker, jeweler and antique dealer, his son Theo Budde and his wife Rie Veldboer continued the business. After her death, the business was sold to Ton Schulten and the Budde house currently contains a luxury shoe shop. The garden is use for sculpture exhibition around the old water well that still exist.

== Legacy ==
After his death in 1959, Budde's poems were published under the title; ‘ne gapse vol’ (a handful). They were republished at the celebration of the 110th anniversary of his birth in August 1999. His poems are still recited at the various tourist and local activities in Ootmarsum, and there is seldom a new book published about this historic town without a mention of his name, a line or the full text of one of his poems. Together with like-minded people in town he formed a core group that kept alive important traditions such as vloggelen at Easter (a procession of people holding hands and singing two religious traditional Eastern songs while walking through town through farm house and certain buildings) during, for example, the difficult times of war.
