= Overload (Sugababes song) =

2000 single by Sugababes

Single by Sugababes

from the album One Touch
- B-side: "Lush Life"
- Released: 11 September 2000
- Studio: Mayfair (London, UK)
- Genre: Pop; R&B
- Length: 4:35
- Label: London
- Songwriters: Keisha Buchanan; Mutya Buena; Siobhán Donaghy; Felix Howard; Cameron McVey; Jony Lipsey; Paul Simm
- Producers: Cameron McVey; Jony Rockstar; Paul Simm

Sugababes singles chronology
"Overload" (2000)	"New Year" (2000)

Audio sample
- file; help

Music video
- "Overload" on YouTube

"Overload" is a song by British girl group Sugababes, released as their debut single. It was issued on 11 September 2000 through London Records as the lead single from the group's debut studio album, One Touch (2000). At the time, the group consisted of Siobhán Donaghy, Mutya Buena and Keisha Buchanan. It was co-produced and co-written by British songwriters and producers Paul Simm, Felix Howard, Jony Rockstar and Cameron McVey. The general theme of the song involves a teenage girl's crush towards a boy and her finding the situation difficult to manage.

The song was listed at 432 on Pitchfork Media's Top 500 songs of the 2000s. It received an overwhelmingly positive reception from music critics. The song features on the soundtrack to the 2001 film High Heels and Low Lifes, directed by Mel Smith, and the 2002 film 40 Days and 40 Nights, directed by Michael Lehmann. The song was nominated for "Best British Single" at the 2001 BRIT Awards and later inspired the title of the group's greatest hits compilation Overloaded: The Singles Collection. English indie pop band Bastille covered the song for the soundtrack of the 2015 film Kill Your Friends. In August 2024, the Sugababes collaborated with A Little Sound on the single "Situation", which interpolates the chorus from "Overload", alongside new lyrics for verses. The song was produced by Billen Ted and Kove.

== Background ==
"Overload" was co-written by group members Keisha Buchanan, Mutya Buena, and Siobhán Donaghy, alongside Felix Howard and the song's co-producers Cameron McVey, Paul Simm and long-time Sugababes contributor Jony Rockstar. The track fuses together styles of soul and hip-hop and features contributions of numerous instruments, including: drum, bass, keyboard, electric guitar and horns.

== Composition ==
"Overload" is a pop and R&B song with elements of soul and hip hop. Amy Raphael of The Observer described it as a "smoothly produced, seductive R&B track". According to the digital sheet music published by EMI, the song is written in the key of F♯ Phrygian dominant using common time, at a tempo of 125 beats per minute. The Sugababes' vocal range in the song spans from the lower note of F♯_{3} to the higher note of G_{5}. The song's chorus line, "Train comes, I don't know its destination", is sung in doubled octaves by Siobhán Donaghy (high) and Keisha Buchanan (low). Matthew Horton of Virgin Media noted that the song contains "huffling beats, honeyed vocals and surf guitar".

== Critical reception ==
"Overload" received universal critical acclaim from music critics. NME regarded the song's quality as "hauntingly infectious", and praised the track as irresistible and radio-friendly. The Portland Mercury also considered the song irresistible, and applauded its "snappy pop harmonies" and "jazzy dance beats". Sydney Morning Herald called the track "disarmingly sophisticated". Cameron Adams of Herald Sun wrote that "Overload" is one of the group's "finest moments", and reflected upon this as to why the song does not resemble those released by other girl groups. The Observer's Kitty Empire called the song a "brilliant" hit with "unexpected class", and cited it as the starting point of the Sugababes' "course to stardom".

Digital Spy considered "Overload" one of the best debut singles by a British girl group, whilst it also made NME's Year End Top 10 Singles for the year of 2000. Pitchfork included it at number 432 on their Top 500 Tracks of the Decade list in 2009. In October 2011, NME placed it at number 51 on its list "150 Best Tracks of the Past 15 Years". In 2014 they included it at number 493 on their list of the "500 Greatest Songs of All Time".

== Chart performance ==
"Overload" entered the UK Singles Chart at number six on 23 September 2000. The following week, it dropped to number nine for two consecutive weeks, and eventually spent a further five weeks on the chart. "Overload" has sold approximately 160,000 copies in the United Kingdom, ranking it as their ninth best-selling single. In Ireland, "Overload" debuted at number 25 and reached its peak of number 15 five weeks later. It was the group's only single from the One Touch era to reach the top-twenty in Ireland. "Overload" entered the singles chart in Austria at number 34 on 21 January 2001, and later reached number three for two consecutive weeks, spending an additional three weeks in the chart's top-ten. It became the group's second-best performing single in Austria to-date.

In Germany, "Overload" debuted at number four and reached number three two weeks later. The song managed to spend six weeks in the chart's top-ten, and was certified Gold by the Bundesverband Musikindustrie, denoting shipments of 250,000 copies of the single. "Overload" reached number five in Switzerland and spent 29 weeks on the chart. In Norway, "Overload" debuted at number 17 and held the position for three consecutive weeks; it reached a peak position of number 12 in its fourth week on the chart. The single attained top-twenty in the Netherlands and top-forty positions in the Flanders and Wallonia regions of Belgium. The song reached number 21 in Sweden and spent 17 weeks on the chart. "Overload" also became a commercial success in New Zealand, where it peaked at number two. In Australia, the song peaked at number 27 for two non-consecutive weeks.

== Music video ==
The music video for "Overload" was directed by Phil Poynter and filmed in London, England in August 2000. The video has no plot and is known for its fresh and simplistic style, a theme that they would continue in their early videos. It features the group in a variety of ever-changing outfits, singing the song in front of a plain white background, either by themselves or together as a group.

== Track listings ==
CD maxi single
No.	Title	Writer(s)	Producer(s)	Length
1.	"Overload" (Original Edit)	Keisha Buchanan; Mutya Buena; Siobhán Donaghy; Felix Howard; Cameron McVey; Paul Simm; Jonathan Lipsey	McVey; Jony Rockstar; Simm	4:35
2.	"Lush Life"	Ron Tom; Carl McIntosh	Tom; McIntosh	4:41
3.	"Overload" (Capoeira Remix – Vocal Version)	Buchanan; Buena; Donaghy; Howard; McVey; Simm; Lipsey	McVey; Rockstar; Simm; Capoeira Twins^{[a]}	8:06
4.	"Overload" (Instrumental)	Buchanan; Buena; Donaghy; Howard; McVey; Simm; Lipsey	McVey; Rockstar; Simm	4:19

UK CD single
No.	Title	Writer(s)	Producer(s)	Length
1.	"Overload" (Original Edit)	Buchanan; Buena; Donaghy; Howard; McVey; Simm; Lipsey	McVey; Rockstar; Simm	4:35
2.	"Lush Life"	Tom; Carl McIntosh	Tom; McIntosh	4:41
3.	"Overload" (Instrumental)	Buchanan; Buena; Donaghy; Howard; McVey; Simm; Lipsey	McVey; Rockstar; Simm	4:19

Notes

- ^{^a} denotes additional producer(s)

== Charts ==
=== Weekly charts ===
Chart (2000–2001)	Peak position
Australia (ARIA)	27
Australian Urban (ARIA)	9
Austria (Ö3 Austria Top 40)	3
Belgium (Ultratop 50 Flanders)	38
Belgium (Ultratop 50 Wallonia)	32
Europe (Eurochart Hot 100)	14
Germany (GfK)	3
Greece (IFPI)	2
Hungary (Mahasz)	3
Iceland (Íslenski Listinn Topp 40)	4
Ireland (IRMA)	15
Netherlands (Dutch Top 40)	14
Netherlands (Single Top 100)	20
New Zealand (Recorded Music NZ)	2
Norway (VG-lista)	12
Scottish Singles Sales (Official Charts)	10
Sweden (Sverigetopplistan)	21
Switzerland (Schweizer Hitparade)	5
UK Singles (Official Charts)	6
UK Airplay (Music Week)	3

=== Year-end charts ===
Chart (2000)	Position
Netherlands (Dutch Top 40)	97
UK Singles (OCC)	120
UK Airplay (Music Week)	39

Chart (2001)	Position
Austria (Ö3 Austria Top 40)	26
Europe (Eurochart Hot 100)	92
Germany (Media Control)	48
Switzerland (Schweizer Hitparade)	69

== Certifications ==
Region	Certification	Certified units/sales
Germany (BVMI)	Gold	250,000^{^}
United Kingdom (BPI)	Silver	231,000
^{^} Shipments figures based on certification alone.

== Release history ==
Region	Date	Format(s)	Label(s)	Ref.
United Kingdom	11 September 2000	12-inch vinyl; CD; cassette	London	
Australia	5 February 2001	CD	London	

== "Situation" ==
"Situation"

Single by A Little Sound and Sugababes
- Released: 30 August 2024
- Length: 2:52
- Label: Ministry of Sound
- Songwriters: McVey; Buchanan; Donaghy; Buena; Howard; Lipsey; Simm; A Little Sound; Katy Tiz
- Producers: Billen Ted; Kove

A Little Sound singles chronology
"Can't Walk Away" (2024)	"Situation" (2024)

Sugababes singles chronology
"When the Rain Comes" (2023)	"Situation" (2024)	"Jungle" (2025)

Visualiser video
- "Situation" on YouTube

"Situation" is a song by English drum and bass musician and TikToker A Little Sound and English girl group Sugababes that interpolates the chorus from the Sugababes' debut 2000 single "Overload" while the verses consist of new lyrics. The song was produced by Billen Ted and Kove.

A Little Sound stated, "I was in a session with Billen Ted and incredible writer Katy Tiz when we realised the chord progression reminded us of something. Billen Ted started humming the melody to 'Overload', and from then, we decided it would be stupid not to give it a go. Katy and I wrote verses to complement the hook, and before we knew it, Sugababes really liked what we'd done and were keen to jump on it with us [...] It took one more studio session to get the girls' harmonies on top of the track, and then we were set for an official release."

=== Music video ===
An official visualiser, filmed on 21 August 2024, was released on the same day as the single's release. The video begins with A Little Sound waiting at a bus stop for the Sugababes, before being joined by them after which they are seen on board a night bus. They each switch places and move around the bus during the video, which is sped up.

=== Charts ===
==== Weekly charts ====
Weekly chart performance
Chart (2024)	Peak position
Latvia Airplay (TopHit)	45
New Zealand Hot Singles (RMNZ)	38
UK Singles Sales (Official Charts Company)	84

==== Monthly charts ====
Monthly chart performance
Chart (2024)	Peak position
Latvia Airplay (TopHit)	55

=== Release history ===
Release history
Region	Date	Format	Label	Ref(s).
Various	30 August 2024	Digital download; streaming	Ministry of Sound Recordings	
