= Don-E =

British soul singer

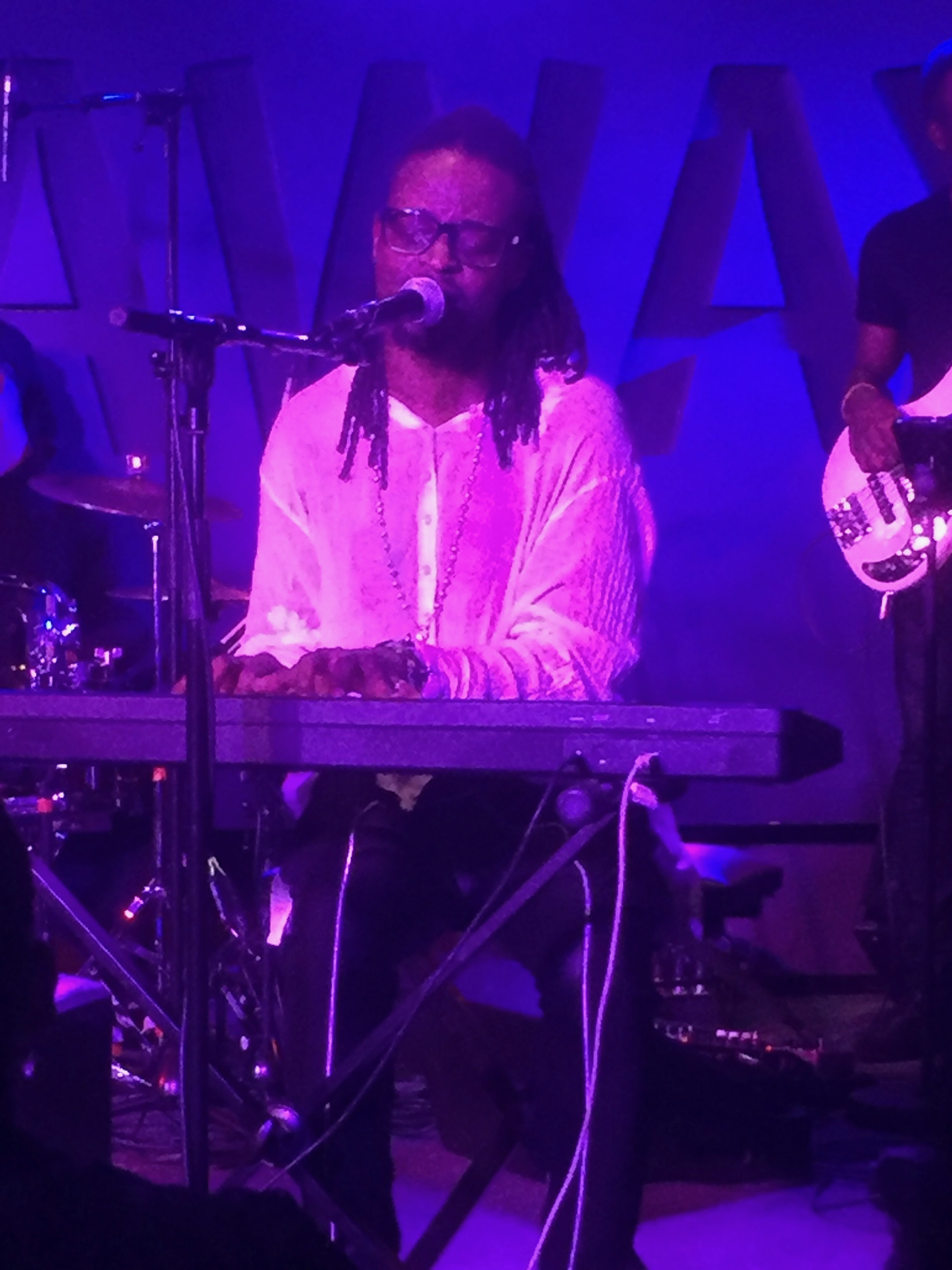

Background information
- Born: Donald McLean; Brixton, London, England
- Genres: Neo soul, soul
- Occupations: Singer, songwriter, musician, record producer
- Instruments: Vocals, keyboards, guitar, drums
- Years active: 1992–present
- Labels: Island, Dome Records
- Website: donmusic.co.uk

Don-E (born Donald McLean, in Brixton, London, England) is a British soul singer, songwriter, musician and producer. Don-E is most well known for his début single, "Love Makes the World Go Round" which reached No. 18 in the UK Singles Chart in 1992.

== Career ==
Don-E's interest in music began when his father, a South London pastor, gave him a home-made guitar for his fifth birthday. After taking an interest in his parents' collection of gospel and soul, he moved onto funk, reggae, jazz and pop.

Whilst still only 19, Don-E was signed to Island Records and recorded his debut, Unbreakable, which was released in 1992 shortly after the summer hit, "Love Makes the World Go Round" scaled the international charts. Don-E wrote and produced the album, as well as providing the majority of the instrumentation. UK 'urban jazz' guitarist Ronny Jordan played on two of the album tracks.

Following the lack of chart success of his second recording, Changing Seasons, Don-E left Island Records to focus on writing and production for a number of artists in the UK and US. It's during this period Don-E was briefly signed to D'Angelo's record label, along with former Jamiroquai member Stuart Zender, who together recorded an album under the name Azur. Among the tracks, Don-E and Zender recorded "So Cold" with D'Angelo playing the Fender Rhodes parts – the track later featuring officially on Don-E's Natural.

Don-E eventually returned to recording as a solo artist, releasing Try This in 2005 through leading black music label, Dome Records. The album features a duet with British R&B peer, Omar.

It was not until the release of his fourth major recording, Natural in 2008, that Don-E began to gain recognition in the music press once more, aided by the inclusion of some of Britain's top black female performers – all of whom Don-E had previously worked with in the studio. Natural featured vocals from ex-Sugababes, Keisha Buchanan and Mutya Buena, plus a duet with Kele Le Roc.

Don-E is a regular member of Grace Jones's band, playing keyboard throughout her Hurricane tour.

The first of Don-E's two-part Ladies Night collection was released in 2012, and showcased a number of up-and-coming British black female vocalists. He joined Peter Gabriel's touring band for the i/o tour in 2023.

== Discography ==
=== Studio albums ===
- Unbreakable (1992)
- Changing Seasons (1995)
- Try This (2005)
- Natural (2008)
- Ladies Night Part 1 (2012)
- Little Star (2013)
- Future Rare Grooves (2014)
- Future Rares 2 (2015)
- 30 (2023)

=== EPs ===
- Sex-E Soul EP (2011)

=== Singles ===
Year	Song	UK
1992	"Love Makes the World Go Round"	18
1992	"Peace in the World"	41
1992	"Oh My Gosh"	—
1993	"Crazy"	—
1995	"Rhythm of Life"	—
1995	"Fakin' the Funk"	82
1996	"Call Me"	—
1998	"Delicious" (with Deni Hines)	52
"—" denotes releases that did not chart.
