= Paul Simm =

English musician and composer

Paul Simm (born 20th century) is an English musician, composer and record producer, known for his work with Amy Winehouse, the Sugababes and Neneh Cherry.

== Biography ==
Paul Simm took up piano aged five and mostly self-taught, by eleven was performing regular gigs in his hometown Birmingham.

He later took up trumpet and was subsequently approached by David Hinds of Steel Pulse, to play and arrange horns for Grammy Award-nominated album Victims.

After relocating to London Simm developed a career as a session musician playing & touring with artists such as Carleen Anderson, Pops Staples, Mica Paris, Baby D, Charles & Eddie and MC Solaar whist simultaneously working in various studios as a sound engineer

Eventually taking to the studio full-time, he worked on All Saints' debut album and co-wrote and co-produced tracks for the Sugababes, including BRIT Award-nominated single "Overload".

Simm co-wrote Siobhán Donaghy's top-20 debut single "Overrated" and has written and produced tracks for Amy Winehouse, Neneh Cherry, Mutya Buena, G. Love, Groove Armada, Beverley Knight, Tom Jones and Lana Del Rey amongst others.

In 2002, Simm and co-writers McVey, Lipsey and Howard were awarded writing credits by ASCAP for the song "Make Over", which appeared on Christina Aguilera's Stripped album, following claims that it borrowed heavily from Sugababes' song "Overload". The track was originally credited as having been written solely by Aguilera and Linda Perry

Simm has composed for commercials including work for Gucci, Bottega Veneta and Virgin.

== Virgin Souls ==
Simm is a member of band Virgin Souls, along with Cameron McVey, Silvio Pacini and Neil Pearson. The band was signed by Pete Tong to London Records with album 162 released in September 2003.

== Other work ==
Production and co-writes on album Kitten Feel by Bethia Beadman

Co-production and co-writes on tracks "I Lay Down" and "Metal Heart" on Sugababes' The Lost Tapes.

Co-writes on tracks for Neneh Cherry albums Blank Project and Broken Politics.

Co-wrote "Good Life", recorded by artist G.Love and released on album Sugar
