= List of songs recorded by Sugababes =

List of songs recorded by British girl band Sugababes

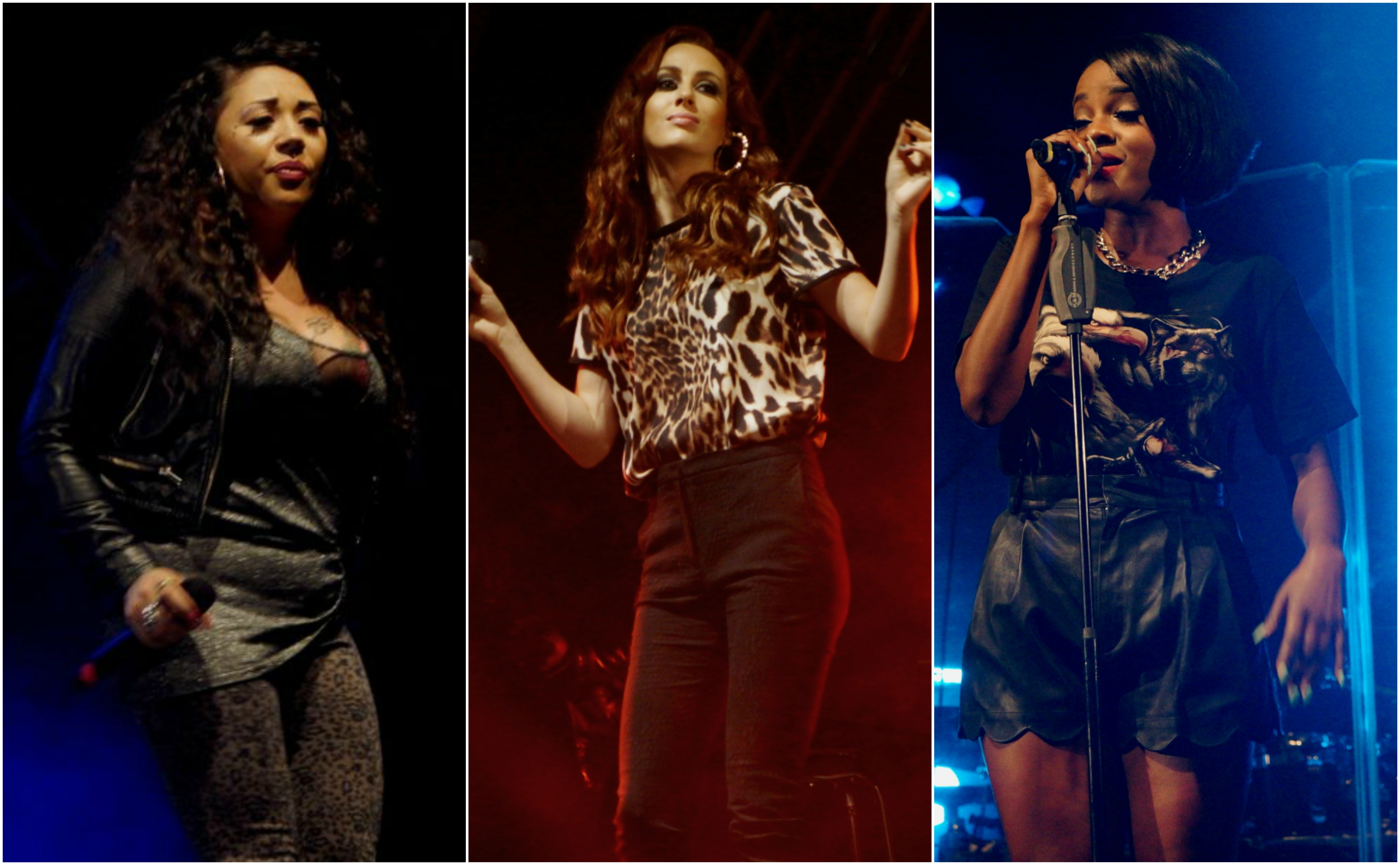
Left to right: Mutya Buena, Siobhán Donaghy and Keisha Buchanan, performing on The Sacred Three Tour, 2013.

This is a list of songs recorded by the British girl group Sugababes.

== Songs ==
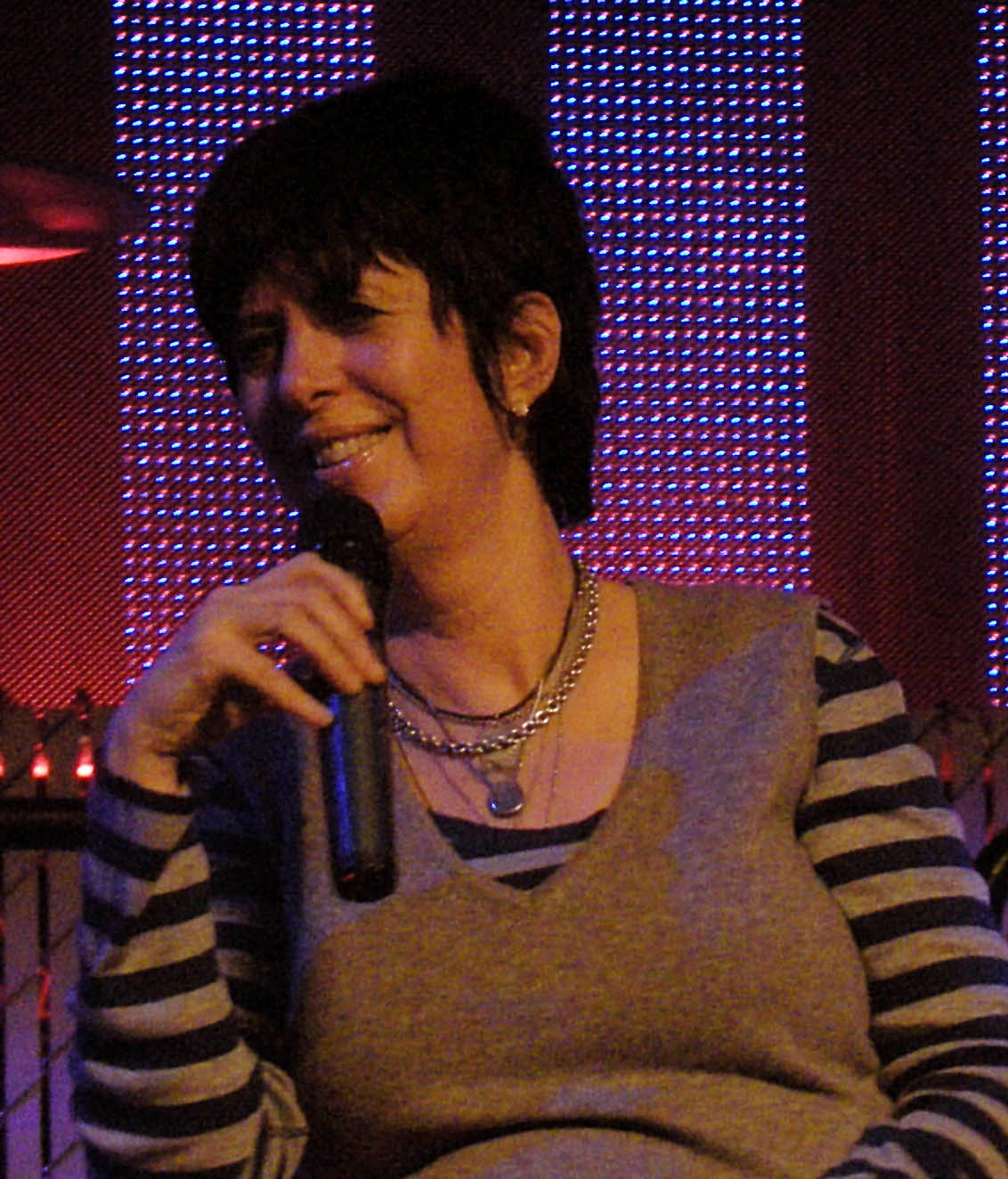
Diane Warren solely composed the Sugababes' 2003 ballad "Too Lost in You".

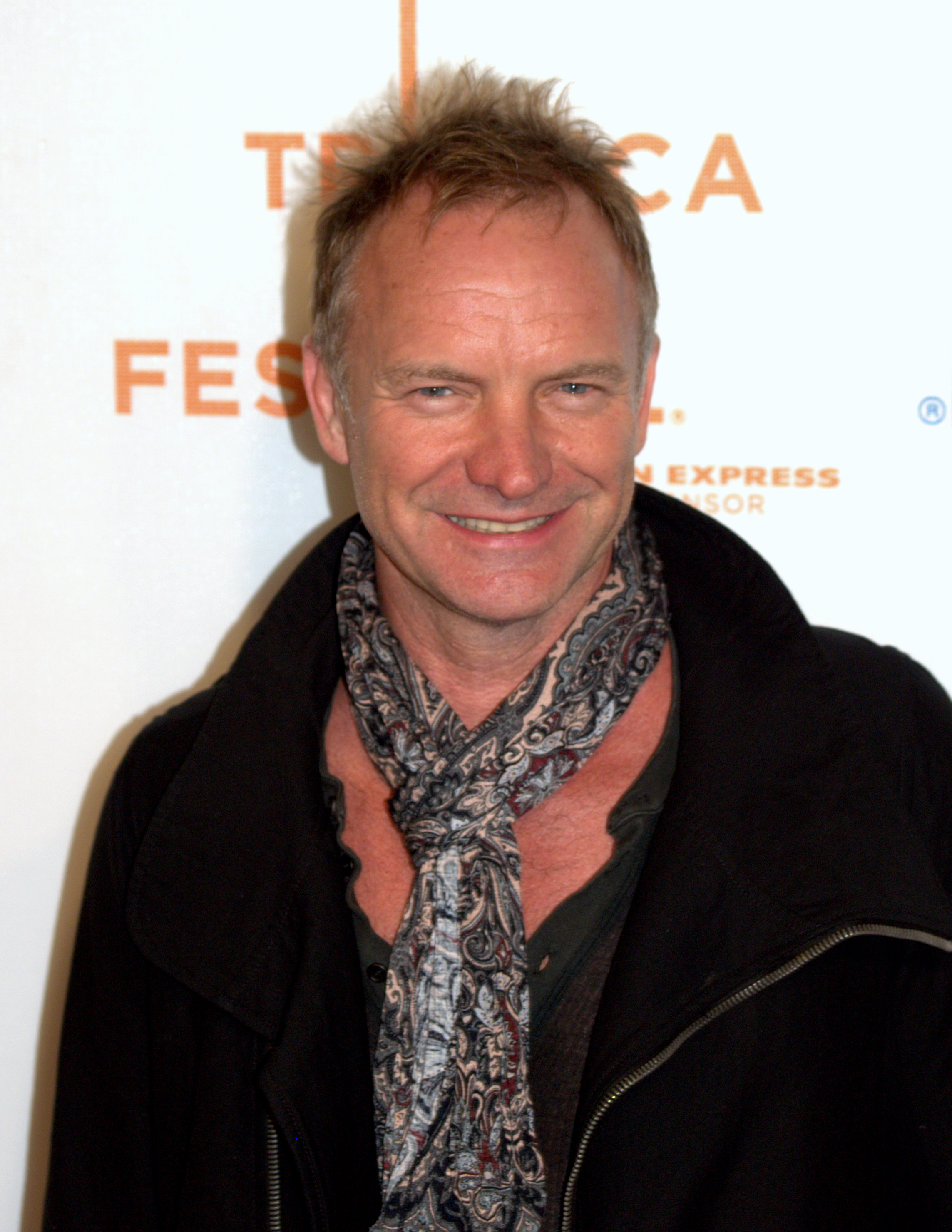
The band's single "Shape" incorporates a sample of Sting's recording "Shape of My Heart".

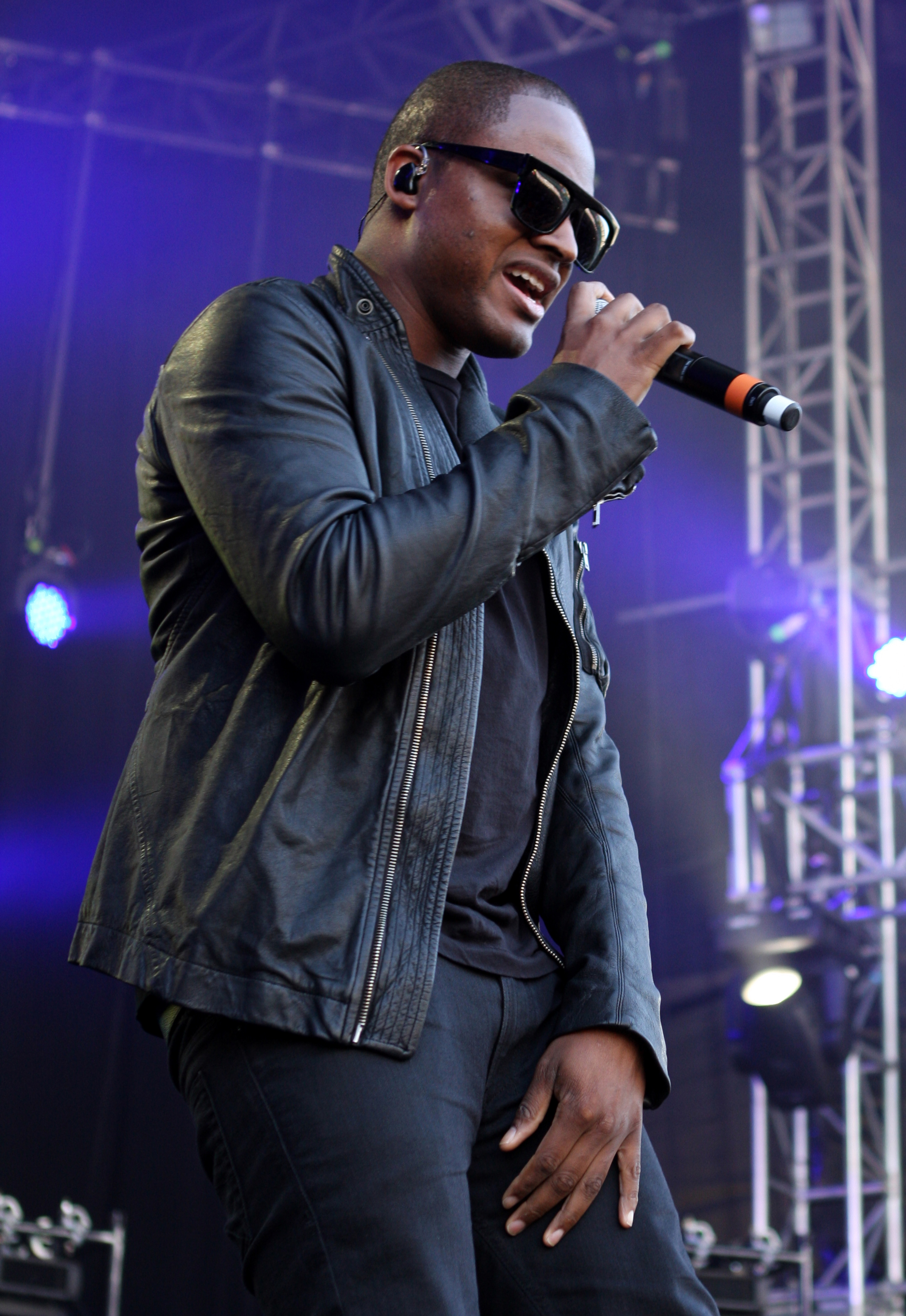
Taio Cruz collaborated with the Sugababes on the song "She's Like a Star", which he wrote and produced.

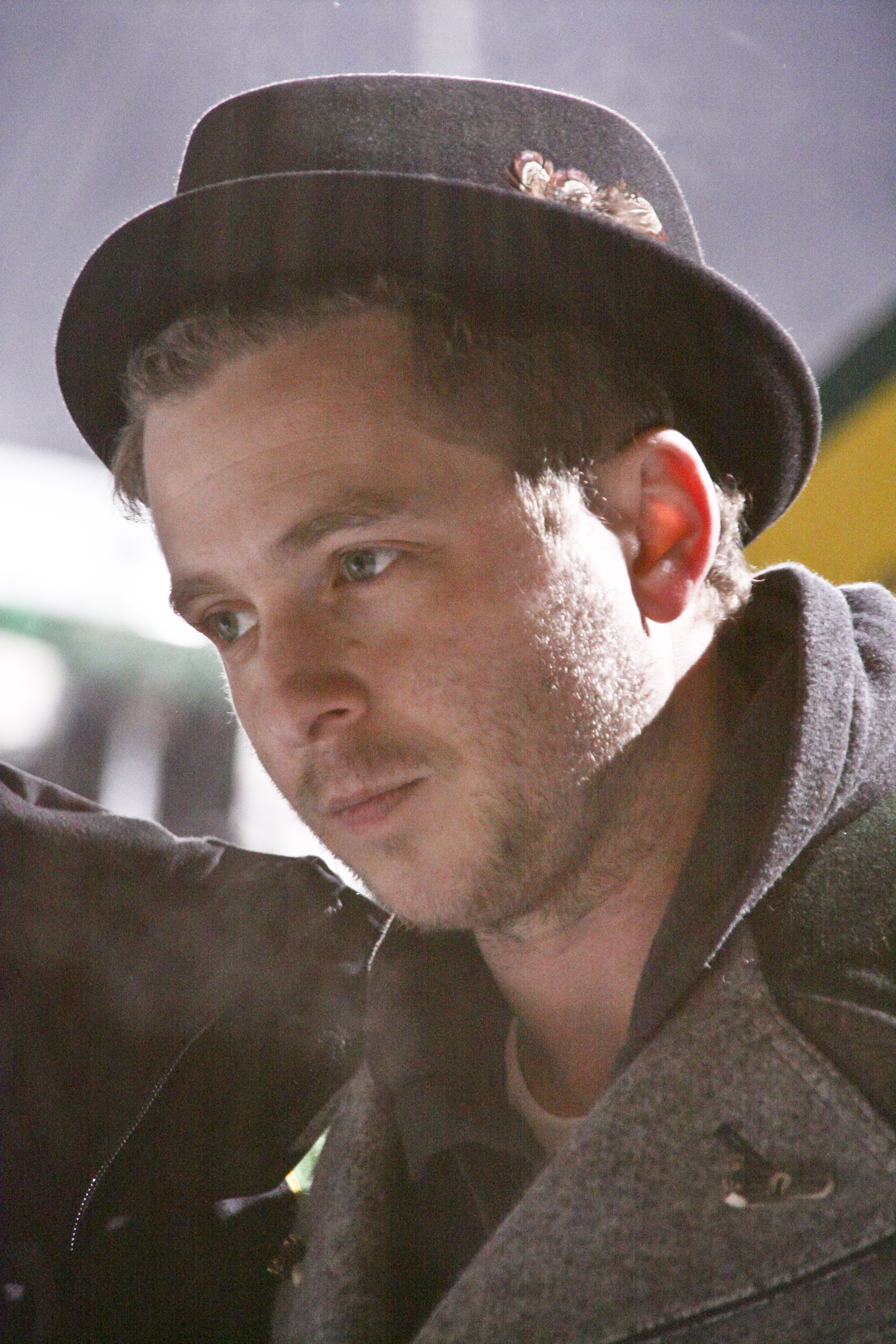
Ryan Tedder co-wrote "Thank You for the Heartbreak" for the group's seventh studio album Sweet 7.

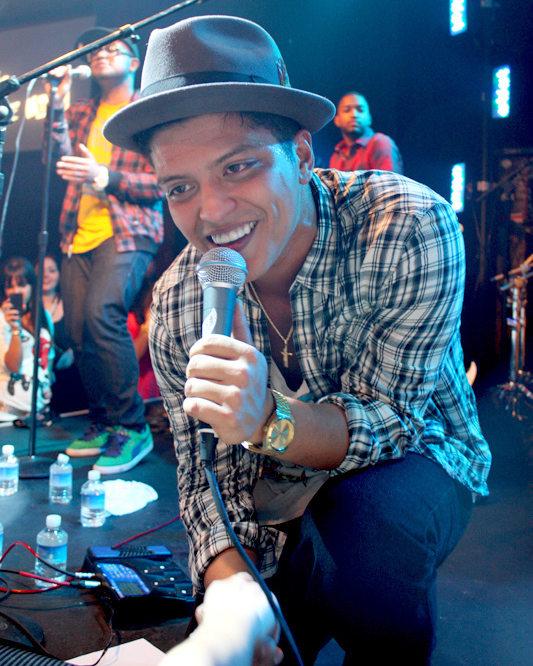
Bruno Mars co-wrote several of the band's tracks, including the singles "Get Sexy" and "Wear My Kiss".

Key
†	Indicates single release
#	Indicates promotional single release

Song	Writer(s)	Release	Year	Ref.
"2 Hearts"	Keisha Buchanan; Mutya Buena; Jony Lipsey; Cameron McVey; Heidi Range	Taller in More Ways	2005	
"3 Spoons of Suga"	Amelle Berrabah; Keisha Buchanan; Jony Lipsey; Karen Poole; Heidi Range; Jeremy Shaw	Change	2007	
"About a Girl" †	Nadir Khayat; Makeba Riddick	Sweet 7	2009	
"About You Now" †	Cathy Dennis; Lukasz Gottwald	Change	2007	
"Ace Reject"	Keisha Buchanan; Mutya Buena; Miranda Cooper; Brian Higgins; Tim Powell; Heidi Range	Taller in More Ways	2005	
"Angels with Dirty Faces" †	Bob Bradley; Brian Higgins; Gray; Heidi Range; Keisha Buchanan; Miranda Cooper; Mutya Buena; Tim Powell	Angels with Dirty Faces	2002	
"Back Down"	Amelle Berrabah; Keisha Buchanan; Heidi Range; Tony Reyes; Alonzo Stevenson	Change	2007	
"Back in the Day"	Keisha Buchanan; Mutya Buena; Siobhán Donaghy; James Murray; Mustafa Omer	The Lost Tapes	2022	
"Back to Life"	Tunde Babalola; Keisha Buchanan; Mutya Buena; Siobhán Donaghy; Ed Drewett; Darren Lewis	The Lost Tapes	2022	
"Back When"	Dallas Austin; Gary White	Change	2007	
"Beat Is Gone"	Keisha Buchanan; Siobhán Donaghy; Wayne Hector; Ash Howes; Richard Stannard	The Lost Tapes	2022	
"Betcha by Golly, Wow"	Thom Bell; Linda Creed	Radio 1 Established 1967	2007	
"Better"	Peter Biker; Keisha Buchanan; Mutya Buena; Karsten Dahlgaard; Heidi Range; Colin Thorpe	Taller in More Ways	2005	
"Beware"	Klas Åhlund; Amelle Berrabah	Catfights and Spotlights	2008	
"Blue"	Robin Boult; Robbie Bronniman; Keisha Buchanan; Mutya Buena; Howard Jones; Heidi Range	Angels with Dirty Faces	2002	
"Boys"	Keisha Buchanan; Siobhán Donaghy; Uzoechi Emenike; Ash Howes; S. Lewis; Richard Stannard	The Lost Tapes	2022	
"Breathe Easy"	Mutya Buena; Craig Dodds	"Freak like Me"	2002	
"Breathe Me"	Dan Carey; Mikkel Eriksen; Sia Furler; Tor Erik Hermansen	The Lost Tapes	2022	
"Bruised"	Keisha Buchanan; Mutya Buena; Cathy Dennis; Heidi Range; Guy Sigsworth	Taller in More Ways	2005	
"Buster"	Keisha Buchanan; Miranda Cooper; Mutya Buena; Brian Higgins; Tim Larcombe; Shawn Lee; Edele Lynch; Heidi Range	Three	2003	
"Can We Call a Truce"	Klas Åhlund; Keisha Buchanan; Deanna; Alex Purple	Catfights and Spotlights	2008	
"Caught in a Moment" †	Keisha Buchanan; Mutya Buena; Jony Lipsey; Karen Poole; Heidi Range; Marius de Vries	Three	2003	
"Change" †	Amelle Berrabah; Keisha Buchanan; Lars Halvor Jensen; Martin Michael Larsson; Heidi Range; Niara Scarlett	Change	2007	
"Colder in the Rain"	Keisha Buchanan; Mutya Buena; Tom Elmhirst; Felix Howard; Jony Lipsey; Heidi Range; Jeremy Shaw	"Ugly"	2005	
"Come Together"	John Lennon; Paul McCartney	"Ugly"	2005	
"Conversation's Over"	Keisha Buchanan; Mutya Buena; Tom Elmhirst; Jony Lipsey; Karen Poole; Heidi Range	Three	2003	
"Crash & Burn"	Marcus John Bryant; Jonas Jeberg; Nakisha Smith	Sweet 7	2010	
"Denial" †	Vanessa Brown; Amelle Berrabah; Keisha Buchanan; Elliot Malloy; Heidi Range; Flex Turner	Change	2007	
"Disturbed"	Dawn Joseph; Michael Scherchen; Naomi Striemer	"In the Middle"	2004	
"Do They Know It's Christmas?" † (Band Aid 20)	Bob Geldof; Midge Ure	Charity record	2004	
"Don't Look Back"	Smokey Robinson; Ronald White	"Girls"	2008	
"Don't Wanna Wait"	Donald McLean; Ron Tom	"Run for Cover"	2001	
"Down Down"	Keisha Buchanan; Mutya Buena; Stuart Crichton; Heidi Range; Hannah Robinson; Guy Sigsworth	"Too Lost in You"	2003	
"Drum"	Keisha Buchanan; Siobhán Donaghy; Uzoechi Emenike	The Lost Tapes	2022	
"Easy" †	George Astasio; Amelle Berrabah; Keisha Buchanan; Jason Pebworth; Heidi Range	Overloaded: The Singles Collection	2006	
"Every Heart Broken"	Klas Åhlund	Catfights and Spotlights	2008	
"Favourite Song"	Keisha Buchanan; Mutya Buena; Jony Lipsey; Cameron McVey; Heidi Range	"Push the Button"	2005	
"Flatline" (Note: Initially released in 2013, "Flatline" was credited to the Sugababes instead of Mutya Keisha Siobhan when it was added back to streaming platforms in 2022.)	Keisha Buchanan; Mutya Buena; Siobhán Donaghy; Devonte Hynes	The Lost Tapes	2013	
"Flowers" (DJ Spoony featuring Sugababes)	Mike Powell; Martin Green	Garage Classical	2019	
"For Once in My Life"	Ron Miller; Orlando Murden	My Inspiration	2009	
"Forever"	Keisha Buchanan; Mutya Buena; Siobhán Donaghy; Matt Rowe; John Themis	"New Year"	2001	
"Freak like Me" †	George Clinton; William Collins; Eugene Hanes; Loren Hill; Gary Numan; Marc Valentine	Angels with Dirty Faces	2002	
"Freedom" #	Kyle Abrahams; George Astasio; Peter Ighile; Rowan Martin; Jason Pebworth; Jon Shave; Mariah Young-Jones	—N/a	2011	
"Future Shokk!"	Keisha Buchanan; Mutya Buena; Mary-Ann Morgan; Heidi Range; Lucas Secon	"Ugly"	2005	
"Get Sexy" †	Fred Fairbrass; Richard Fairbrass; Philip Lawrence; Ari Levine; Rob Manzoli; Bruno Mars	Sweet 7	2009	
"Ghost" †	Keisha Buchanan; Mutya Buena; Siobhán Donaghy; Wayne Hector; Jon Shave	Sugababes	2026	
"Girls" †	Keisha Buchanan; Nicole Jenkinson; Anna McDonald; Allen Toussaint	Catfights and Spotlights	2008	
"Give It to Me Now"	Crystal Johnson; Reggie Perry	Sweet 7	2010	
"Good to Be Gone"	Amelle Berrabah; George Astasio; Heidi Range; Jason Pebworth; Keisha Buchanan	Overloaded: The Singles Collection	2006	
"Gotta Be You"	Penelope Magnet; Terius Nash; Christopher Stewart	Taller in More Ways	2005	
"Groove Is Going On"	Mutya Buena	"Round Round"	2002	
"Hanging on a Star"	George Astasio; Keisha Buchanan; Geeki; Jason Pebworth; Jon Shave	Catfights and Spotlights	2008	
"Hole in the Head" †	Keisha Buchanan; Mutya Buena; Nick Coler; Miranda Cooper; Brian Higgins; Tim Powell; Heidi Range; Niara Scarlett	Three	2003	
"I Bet You Look Good on the Dancefloor"	Alex Turner	"Red Dress"	2006	
"I Can't Take It No More"	Amelle Berrabah; Keisha Buchanan; Heidi Range; Jony Rockstar; Jeremy Shaw	"Change"	2007	
"I Lay Down"	Keisha Buchanan; Siobhán Donaghy; Cameron McVey; Paul Simm	The Lost Tapes	2022	
"I'm Alright"	Seton Daunt; Siobhán Donaghy; Bradford Ellis; Ash Howes; Iain James; Richard Stannard	The Lost Tapes	2022	
"In Recline"	Amelle Berrabah; Keisha Buchanan; Cathy Dennis; Heidi Range; Jony Rockstar	"About You Now"	2007	
"In the Middle" †	Michael Bellina; Keisha Buchanan; Mutya Buena; Miranda Cooper; Lisa Cowling; Phil Fuldner; Brian Higgins; Shawn Lee; Heidi Range; Niara Scarlett; Andre Tegler	Three	2003	
"It Ain't Easy"	Dallas Austin	Taller in More Ways	2005	
"Joy Division"	Keisha Buchanan; Mutya Buena; Jony Lipsey; Cameron McVey; Heidi Range	Taller in More Ways	2005	
"Jungle" †	Keisha Buchanan; Mutya Buena; Siobhán Donaghy; Wayne Hector; Anya Jones; Jon Shave	Sugababes	2025	
"Just Don't Need This"	Keisha Buchanan; Mutya Buena; Howard Jones; Jony Lipsey; Heidi Range; Jeremy Shaw	Angels with Dirty Faces	2002	
"Just Let It Go"	Mutya Buena; Keisha Buchanan; Siobhán Donaghy; Matt Rowe; John Themis	One Touch	2000	
"Killer"	Seal Henry Samuel; Adam Tinley	"Shape"	2003	
"Like the Weather"	Keisha Buchanan; Mutya Buena; Cathy Dennis; Heidi Range; Guy Sigsworth	"Push the Button"	2005	
"Little Lady Love"	Keisha Buchanan; Mutya Buena; Siobhán Donaghy; Jony Lipsey; Cameron McVey; Paul Simm	"New Year"	2000	
"Little Miss Perfect"	Mikkel Eriksen; Tor Erik Hermansen; Claude Kelly	Sweet 7	2010	
"Look at Me"	Keisha Buchanan; Mutya Buena; Siobhán Donaghy; Felix Howard; Jony Lipsey; Cameron McVey; Paul Simm	One Touch	2000	
"Love Me Hard"	Keisha Buchanan; Siobhán Donaghy; Iain James; Richard Stannard	The Lost Tapes	2022	
"Lush Life"	Cameron Macintosh; Ron Tom	One Touch	2000	
"Maya"	Keisha Buchanan; Mutya Buena; Craig Dodds; Heidi Range; Guy Sigsworth	Three	2003	
"Mended By You"	Heidi Range; Keisha Buchanan; Jony Lipsey; Karen Poole; Jeremy Shaw	Change	2007	
"Metal Heart"	Keisha Buchanan; Mutya Buena; Siobhán Donaghy; Cameron McVey; Paul Simm	The Lost Tapes	2022	
"Million Different Ways"	Keisha Buchanan; Mutya Buena; Stuart Crichton; Craig Dodds; Felix Howard; Heidi Range; Guy Sigsworth	Three	2003	
"More Than a Million Miles"	Keisha Buchanan; Mutya Buena; Thomas Boll Christensen; Mary-Ann Morgan; Heidi Range; Lucas Secon	Angels with Dirty Faces	2002	
"My Love Is Pink" †	Keisha Buchanan; Nick Coler; Miranda Cooper; Lisa Cowling; Brian Higgins; Tim Powell; Heidi Range	Change	2007	
"Nasty Ghetto"	Keisha Buchanan; Mutya Buena; Linda Perry; Heidi Range	Three	2003	
"Never Gonna Dance Again"	Keisha Buchanan; Nick Coler; Miranda Cooper; Lisa Cowling; Brian Higgins; Tim Powell; Heidi Range	Change	2007	
"New Year" †	Keisha Buchanan; Mutya Buena; Siobhán Donaghy; Felix Howard; Jony Lipsey; Cameron McVey; Matt Rowe	One Touch	2000	
No Can Do †	George Astasio; Vanessa Brown; Jason Pebworth; Jon Shave	Catfights and Spotlights	2008	
"No Man, No Cry"	Keisha Buchanan; Mutya Buena; Craig Dodds; Heidi Range	Angels with Dirty Faces	2002	
"No More You"	Mikkel Eriksen; Tor Erik Hermansen; Shaffer Smith	Sweet 7	2010	
"No Regrets"	Keisha Buchanan; Hugo Chegwin; Harry Craze; Siobhán Donaghy; Ben Harrison; Felix Howard; Iain James; Lucas Juby	The Lost Tapes	2022	
"Nothing's as Good as You"	Klas Åhlund; Keisha Buchanan	Catfights and Spotlights	2008	
"Now You're Gone"	Amelle Berrabah; Keisha Buchanan; Tim Hawes; Pete Kirtley; Heidi Range; Niara Scarlett	Taller in More Ways	2005	
"Obsession"	Michael Des Barres; Holly Knight	Taller in More Ways	2005	
"One Foot In"	Keisha Buchanan; Mutya Buena; Sonia Cupid; Siobhán Donaghy; Luke Smith; Paul Watson	One Touch	2000	
"One Touch"	Ron Tom	One Touch	2000	
"Only You"	Keisha Buchanan; Mutya Buena; Siobhán Donaghy; Ash Howes; Richard Stannard	The Lost Tapes	2022	
"Open the Door"	Keisha Buchanan; Cathy Dennis; Lukasz Gottwald; Heidi Range	Change	2007	
"Overload" †	Keisha Buchanan; Mutya Buena; Siobhán Donaghy; Jony Lipsey; Cameron McVey; Paul Simm	One Touch	2000	
"Please Can I Talk?" (Jools Holland featuring Sugababes)	Jools Holland	Friends 3	2004	
"Promises"	Keisha Buchanan; Mutya Buena; Siobhán Donaghy; Felix Howard; Jony Lipsey; Cameron McVey; Paul Simm	One Touch	2000	
"Push the Button" †	Dallas Austin; Keisha Buchanan; Mutya Buena; Heidi Range	Taller in More Ways	2005	
"Real Thing"	Keisha Buchanan; Mutya Buena; Siobhán Donaghy; Matt Rowe; John Themis	One Touch	2000	
"Red Dress" †	Bob Bradley; Keisha Buchanan; Mutya Buena; Nick Coler; Miranda Cooper; Lisa Cowling; Brian Higgins; Shawn Lee; Tim Powell; Heidi Range	Taller in More Ways	2005	
"Round Round" †	Keisha Buchanan; Mutya Buena; Nick Coler; Miranda Cooper; Lisa Cowling; Brian Higgins; Shawn Lee; Tim Powell; Heidi Range; Niara Scarlett	Angels with Dirty Faces	2002	
"Run for Cover" †	Keisha Buchanan; Mutya Buena; Siobhán Donaghy; Jony Lipsey; Cameron McVey; Paul Simm	One Touch	2000	
"Santa Baby" †	Joan Javits; Philip Springer; Tony Springer	—N/a	2009	
"Same Old Story"	Keisha Buchanan; Mutya Buena; Siobhán Donaghy; Matt Rowe; John Themis	One Touch	2000	
"Shake It"	Beverley Clarke; Karl Gordon; Vicky O'Neill; Gareth Young	"Easy"	2006	
"Shape" †	Sting; Craig Dodds; Dominic Miller	Angels with Dirty Faces	2002	
"She's a Mess"	Philip Lawrence; Ari Levine; Bruno Mars	Sweet 7	2010	
"She's like a Star" (Taio Cruz featuring Sugababes and Busta Rhymes)	Taio Cruz	Catfights and Spotlights; Departure	2008	
"Shook" †	Keisha Buchanan; Mutya Buena; Siobhán Donaghy; Anya Jones; Jon Shave	Sugababes	2025	
"Side Chick"	Klas Åhlund; Keisha Buchanan; Alex Purple	Catfights and Spotlights	2008	
"Sing" (Annie Lennox featuring Various Artists)	Annie Lennox	Songs of Mass Destruction	2007	
"Situation's Heavy"	Keisha Buchanan; Mutya Buena; Gary Cooper; Brian Higgins; Tim Larcombe; Shawn Lee; Edele Lynch; Heidi Range	Three	2003	
"Someone in My Bed"	Bob Bradley; Keisha Buchanan; Mutya Buena; Miranda Cooper; Lisa Cowling; Brian Higgins; Niara Scarlett	"Too Lost in You"	2003	
"Stronger" †	Keisha Buchanan; Mutya Buena; Felix Howard; Heidi Range; Jony Rockstar; Marius de Vries	Angels with Dirty Faces	2002	
"Sometimes"	Keisha Buchanan; Mutya Buena; Felix Howard; Jony Lipsey; Heidi Range; Marius de Vries	Three	2003	
"Soul Sound" †	Charlotte Edwards; Sam Harley; Ron Tom	One Touch	2000	
"Sound of Goodbye"	Steve Booker; Keisha Buchanan; Karen Poole	Catfights and Spotlights	2008	
"Spiral" (William Orbit featuring Sugababes and Kenna)	Kenna; Keisha Buchanan; Mutya Buena; Karen Poole; Heidi Range; William Orbit	Hello Waveforms	2006	
"Spiralling"	Tom Chaplin; Richard Hughes; Jesse Quin; Tim Rice-Oxley	"No Can Do"	2008	
"Summer of '99"	Siobhán Donaghy; Jim Eliot; Shaznay Lewis	The Lost Tapes	2022	
"Sunday Rain"	Amelle Berrabah; Steve Booker; Keisha Buchanan; Karen Poole; Heidi Range	Catfights and Spotlights	2008	
"Sugababes on the Run"	Donald McLean; Lucas Secon; Ron Tom	"New Year"	2000	
"Supernatural"	Michelle Bell; Christian Karlsson; Pontus Winnberg	Angels with Dirty Faces	2002	
"Surprise"	Cathy Dennis; Lukasz Gottwald	Change	2007	
"Sweet & Amazing (Make It the Best)"	Rob Allen; Mikkel Eriksen; Tor Erik Hermansen; Martin Kleveland; Bernt Stray	Sweet 7	2010	
"Switch"	Keisha Buchanan; Mutya Buena; Felix Howard; Henrick Jonback; Frederick Odesjo; Heidi Range; Nina Woodford	Angels with Dirty Faces	2002	
"Teardrops"	Cecil Womack; Linda Womack	Island Life: 50 Years of Island Records	2009	
"Thank You for the Heartbreak"	Mikkel Eriksen; Tor Erik Hermansen; Claude Kelly; Ryan Tedder	Sweet 7	2010	
"This Ain't a Party Thing"	Keisha Buchanan; Mutya Buena; Felix Howard; Jony Lipsey; Heidi Range	"Hole in the Head"	2003	
"Today"	Keisha Buchanan; Mutya Buena; Gifty Dankwah; Siobhán Donaghy; Uzoechi Emenike	The Lost Tapes	2022	
"Too Lost in You" †	Diane Warren	Three	2003	
"Twisted"	Keisha Buchanan; Mutya Buena; Miranda Cooper; Brian Higgins; Tim Larcombe; Shawn Lee; Edele Lynch; Heidi Range	Three	2003	
"Ugly" †	Dallas Austin	Taller in More Ways	2005	
"Unbreakable Heart"	Klas Åhlund; Max Martin	Catfights and Spotlights	2008	
"Undignified"	Amelle Berrabah; Keisha Buchanan; Tom Nichols; Heidi Range; Flex Turner	Change	2007	
"Victory"	Mitch Allan; Keisha Buchanan; Siobhán Donaghy; Jason Evigan; Sia Furler	The Lost Tapes	2022	
"Virgin Sexy"	Keisha Buchanan; Mutya Buena; Mary-Ann Morgan; Heidi Range; Lucas Secon	Angels with Dirty Faces	2002	
"Wait for You"	Fernando Garibay; Philip Lawrence; Bruno Mars	Sweet 7	2010	
"Walk This Way" † (Sugababes vs. Girls Aloud)	Joe Perry; Steven Tyler	Charity record	2007	
"We Could Have It All"	Keisha Buchanan; Mutya Buena; Craig Dodds; Johnny Dollar; Felix Howard	Three	2003	
"Wear My Kiss" †	Carlos Battey; Steven Battey; Fernando Garibay; Philip Lawrence; Bruno Mars	Sweet 7	2010	
"Weeds" †	Keisha Buchanan; Mutya Buena; Tove Burman; Siobhán Donaghy; Sam Harper; Anya Jones; Jon Shave; Jeff Young	Sugababes	2025	
"Whatever Makes You Happy"	Keisha Buchanan; Gary Cooper; Stuart Crichton; Craig Dodds; Pete Martin	Three	2003	
"When the Rain Comes" †	Mutya Buena; Keisha Buchanan; Siobhán Donaghy; Iain James; George Moore	—N/a	2023	
"Who"	Bob Bradley; Keisha Buchanan; Mutya Buena; Miranda Cooper; Brian Higgins; Heidi Range; Niara Scarlett	"Hole in the Head"	2003	
"You on a Good Day"	Klas Åhlund; Keisha Buchanan	Catfights and Spotlights	2008	

== See also ==
- Sugababes discography
