= Sugababes '25 Tour =

2025 concert tour by the Sugababes

Sugababes '25
- Tour by Sugababes
- Promotional poster
- Location: Europe
- Start date: 8 April 2025
- End date: 2 May 2025
- No. of shows: 16

Sugababes concert chronology
- Australia Tour (2024–2025); Sugababes '25 (2025); Sugababes 2027 UK Tour (2027)

Sugababes '25 was the ninth concert tour by English girl group Sugababes, with 16 shows taking place in Europe throughout April and May 2025. The tour followed the group's four-date Australian tour which took place between December 2024 and January 2025. The tour has been described by the group as "our biggest-ever UK and European tour".

The tour commenced on 8 April 2025 in Leeds, England, and concluded on 2 May of the same year, in Milan, Italy. The opening shows received generally positive reviews, with critics praising the group for their vocal ability, energy and unity.

== Background ==
The Sugababes are an English girl group composed of Mutya Buena, Keisha Buchanan and Siobhán Donaghy, formed in 1998. The lineup changed three times before returning to the original lineup in 2011 under the name Mutya Keisha Siobhan. The group released one single under the name Mutya Keisha Siobhan, "Flatline" in 2013, which became a moderate hit, and planned to release an album which was later scrapped due to most of the material being leaked. Since re-claiming the Sugababes name in 2019, the group have released their eighth studio album The Lost Tapes (2022), which contained "Flatline" and the leaked songs recorded almost ten years prior.

The group's previous tours have been mostly constricted to theatres as they opted for a more intimate setting, such as the 30-show Change Tour (2008), which to date is their longest yet. In September 2023, the group played their first concert at the O2 Arena in London, dubbed as "One Night Only", which sold-out and received positive reviews. They followed this with a slot on the Glastonbury Festival's West Holts stage in June 2024, which drew unprecedented crowd numbers, and a headlining set at Manchester Pride in August 2024. Following these successes, the Sugababes announced a large-scale tour on 22 October 2024, featuring arena shows in the UK and Ireland, and a mix of theatre and arena shows in Europe, with tickets going on pre-sale on 25 October 2024.

Commenting on the tour, the Sugababes stated: "The last few years have been an absolute blast, and we can’t wait to hit the road together next spring! Wait until you see what we’ve got up our sleeve!". During an appearance on The One Show in October 2024, the group revealed that they have been working on their ninth studio album with hopes to include new music on the tour's setlist. In regard to new music, Donaghy commented: "We are working on it. We haven't got a release date just yet, but it's very close to being finished, and we're really excited about it", and that it will "hopefully be ready for the arena tour". On 13 March 2025, the group released the garage and alternative-pop single "Jungle", their first new solo material since 2023's "When the Rain Comes". In April 2025, the group released a follow-up single "Weeds".

== Critical reception ==
Reviewing the London O2 Arena show, Rolling Stone UK's Ben Jolley described the setlist as "wall-to-wall bangers", and complimented the group's vocal ability. He also praised the addition of their "earlier music videos" and "archive rehearsal footage" playing as backdrops as being a "nice touch", and noted how the group remained on their feet "throughout the entire concert", even during "softer moments like anti-bullying anthem 'Ugly'". The Daily Telegraph's Poppie Platt offered a more mixed review on the London show, complimenting the performances of their hits such as "Hole in the Head" and "Red Dress", but criticised the "plodding" "No Regrets" and "Flatline", as "failing to hype up the audience". She concluded that "it wasn't a show to set the world alight", but it "served its purpose as a fun night out complete with some fun songs". Jordan Page of The London Standard praised the group's vocal ability and "sisterhood", especially during the performances of "Flatline" and "One Touch", describing the former as being a "highlight" and showing off "their iconic vocal harmonies". He noted the group's "slight awkwardness", describing it as part of their "charm", but that they "loosened up" as the night went on, concluding that it feels "great to have the original Sugababes back again".

== Set list ==
This set list is from the concert in Leeds on 8 April 2025. It represents all concerts for the tour.

1. "Overload"
2. "Hole in the Head"
3. "In the Middle"
4. "Red Dress"
5. "Ugly"
6. "No Regrets"
7. "Flatline"
8. "Shape"
9. "Run for Cover"
10. "Lush Life"
11. "One Touch"
12. "Weeds"
13. "Too Lost in You"
14. "Stronger"
15. "Flowers"
16. "Round Round"
17. "Jungle"
18. "Freak like Me"
19. "Push the Button"
20. "About You Now"

== Tour dates ==
List of 2025 concerts
Date (2025)	City	Country	Venue
8 April	Leeds	England	First Direct Arena
10 April	London	England	The O2 Arena
11 April	Manchester	England	Co-op Live
12 April	Birmingham	England	BP Pulse Live
14 April	Cardiff	Wales	Utilita Arena
16 April	Newcastle	England	Utilita Arena
17 April	Glasgow	Scotland	OVO Hydro
19 April	Belfast	Northern Ireland	SSE Arena
20 April	Dublin	Ireland	3Arena
22 April	Antwerp	Belgium	Lotto Arena
23 April	Amsterdam	Netherlands	AFAS Live
26 April	Cologne	Germany	The Palladium
27 April	Berlin	Germany	Uber Eats Music Hall
29 April	Paris	France	Olympia Hall
30 April	Zurich	Switzerland	Halle 622
2 May	Milan	Italy	Fabrique
