= Sugababes (album) =

Studio album by Sugababes
- Released: 12 February 2027
- Length: 42:37
- Label: Sacred Three

Sugababes chronology
The Lost Tapes (2022)	Sugababes (2027)

Singles from Sugababes
- 1. "Ghost" Released: 24 September 2026; 2. "Love Language" Released: 20 November 2026

Sugababes is the upcoming ninth studio album by the English girl group Sugababes. It is set to be released on 12 February 2027, through Sacred Three. The album will contain twelve tracks, including the group's 2025 singles "Jungle", "Weeds" and "Shook". The lead single, "Ghost", was released on 24 September 2026, followed by the second single "Love Language" on 20 November. To support the album, the group will embark on a 2027 UK tour.

== Background and release ==
In 2011, the original line-up of the Sugababes reformed, consisting of Keisha Buchanan, Siobhán Donaghy, and Mutya Buena. They released the single "Flatline" in 2013, under the moniker Mutya Keisha Siobhan (MKS). In 2019, the group regained the rights to use their group name "Sugababes", after which they released their eighth studio album, The Lost Tapes (2022). It consists of leaked songs recorded between 2011 and 2013 as MKS. In 2023, the group released the single "When the Rain Comes", which was followed by the singles "Jungle", "Weeds" and "Shook" in 2025.

Sugababes is set to be released on 12 February 2027, through Sacred Three, with the Orchard handling distribution of the album. It will mark the original trio's first new material recorded under the Sugababes name in 26 years, since One Touch (2000). Commenting on the album's title, the group stated:

We’ve poured so much into the songs, the sound and every detail around it, and the more it came together, the clearer it became that there was only one thing we could call it: Sugababes. It feels unmistakably us. We've loved writing and recording this record, and we're so excited that it's finally time for people to hear it.

The album cover was shot by Liz Collins, who also shot the cover for One Touch. The album's track listing contains twelve songs, including the group's singles released in 2025. Sugababes worked with a range of collaborators on the album, including Jon Shave, Anya Jones, PRGRSHN, Simon Aldred, and George Moore.

== Promotion ==
On 22 September, the group's social media accounts were cleared, and a post featuring an image of a table and three chairs was published with a caption in Latin reading "Si me dederis ad lupos, dux eorum revertar". The phrase translates to "Throw me to the wolves and I'll return leading the pack". A countdown to 24 September was also added to their website. The album and its tracklist were announced once the countdown had concluded, along with the lead single "Ghost" being released. On November 12, the group began teasing another song, "Love Language", on their website, sharing a snippet of the track with their fan community. The song was released on 20 November.

=== Live performances ===
Sugababes performed the track "Modern Love" during various festival appearances prior to the announcement of the album, including at the Henley Festival on 11 July 2026, and Depot Live in Cardiff on 25 July. On 2 October, the group announced on their social media that they would be embarking on an "up close and personal" concert tour in March 2027 to support the album, which will feature dates in London, Manchester, Birmingham, and Glasgow. The group performed the album's lead single "Ghost" on The Graham Norton Show on 30 October.

=== Singles ===
"Ghost" was released on 24 September 2026 as the album's lead single. Its accompanying music video premiered at 17:00 BST and was directed by Thomas James. The song reached number 22 on the UK Singles Sales chart, and number nine on the UK Airplay Chart. On 20 November, "Love Language" was released to music streaming services as the album's second single.

== Track listing ==
Sugababes track listing
No.	Title	Writer(s)	Producer(s)	Length
1.	"Peace and Love"			4:02
2.	"Jungle"	Jon Shave; Anya Jones; Wayne Hector; Siobhan Donaghy; Keisha Buchanan; Mutya Buena	Shave	2:40
3.	"Ghost"	Shave; Jones; Buchanan; Buena; Donaghy; Hector	Shave	3:37
4.	"Love Language"	Shave; Jones; Donaghy; Buchanan; Buena; Craig Armstrong; Reiad Chibah	Shave; Big Softy	3:33
5.	"Modern Love"			2:53
6.	"Shook"	Shave; Jones; Buchanan; Buena; Donaghy	Shave; Big Softy	2:56
7.	"After All"			4:54
8.	"Weeds"	Shave; Jones; Buchanan; Buena; Donaghy; Sam Harper; Tove Burman; Jeff Young	Shave	3:05
9.	"Plot Twist"			3:05
10.	"Scorpio"			3:33
11.	"Ain't It Funny"			2:59
12.	"Full Circle"			5:20
Total length:				42:37

=== Notes ===
- "Love Language" is built around "Finding Beauty" (2002) by the composer Craig Armstrong.

== Release history ==
Release history
Date	Format(s)	Label	Ref.
12 February 2027	Cassette; CD; LP; music download; streaming	Sacred Three	
