= List of awards and nominations received by Sugababes =

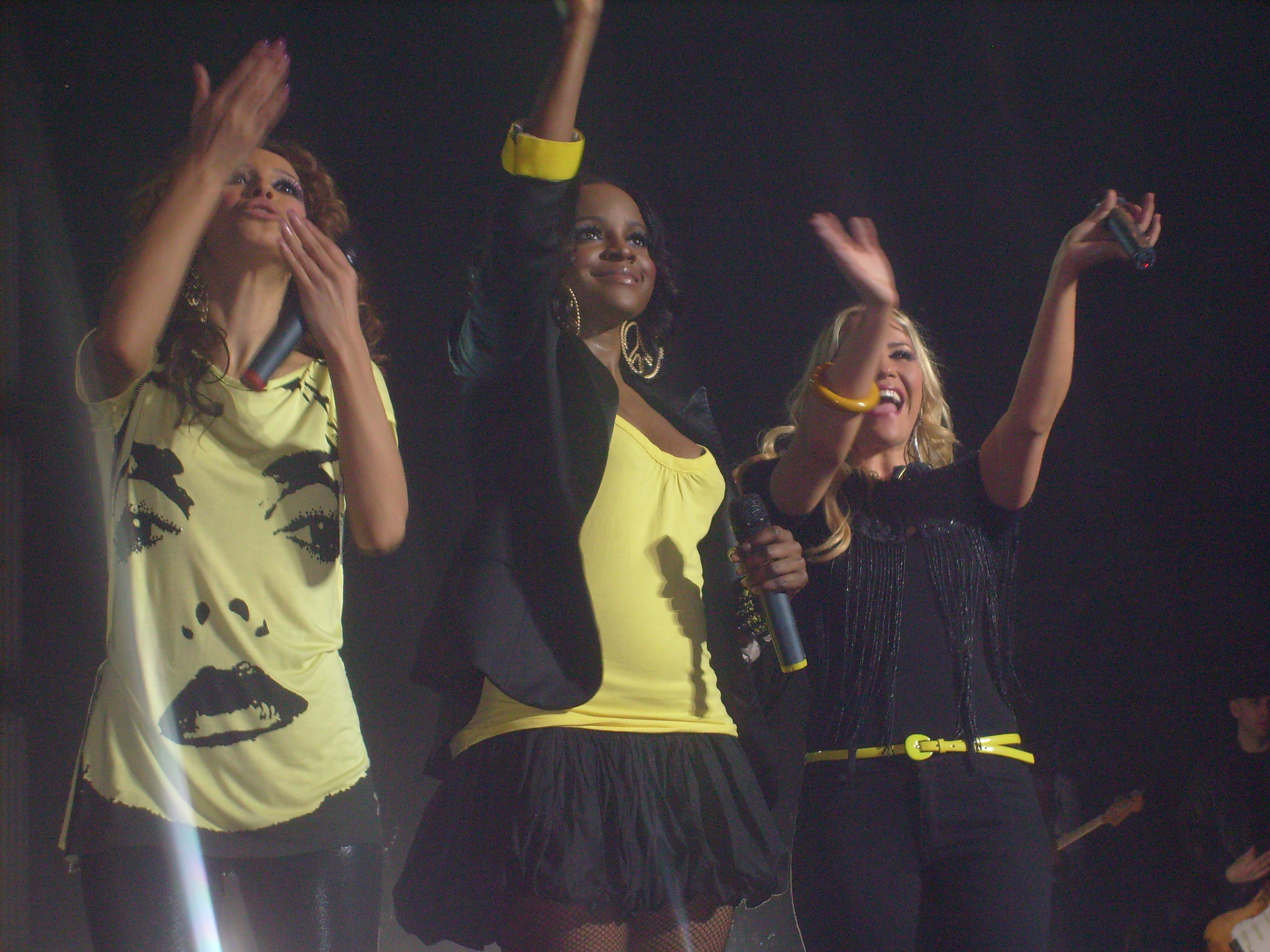
Sugababes in 2008

This is a list of awards received by the British girl group Sugababes.

== BMI Pop Awards ==
Year	Nominee / work	Award	Result
2005	"Hole in the Head"	Pop Award	Won

== Brit Awards ==
The Brit Awards are the British Phonographic Industry's annual popular music awards. Sugababes has received one award from eight nominations. Sugababes as only British Dance Act winning girl group.

Year	Recipient	Award	Result	Ref.
2001	"Overload"	British Single of the Year	Nominated	
2003	Angels with Dirty Faces	British Album of the Year	Nominated	
2003	Sugababes	British Dance Act	Won	
2003	Sugababes	British Group	Nominated	
2004	Sugababes	British Group	Nominated	
2005	"In the Middle"	British Single of the Year	Nominated	
2006	"Push the Button"	British Single of the Year	Nominated	
2008	"About You Now"	British Single of the Year	Nominated	

== Capital FM Awards ==
Year	Recipient	Award	Result	Ref.
2001	Sugababes	Best Kept Secret	Won	
2004	Sugababes	Best Live Music	Won	
2008	Sugababes	Studio 7: Live Session Award	Nominated	
2008	Sugababes	News of the World 'Fabulous Award'	Nominated	
2008	Sugababes	London's Favourite UK Band	Nominated	
2008	Change	London's Favourite UK Album	Nominated	
2008	"About You Now"	London's Favourite UK Single	Nominated	

== Cosmopolitan Ultimate Women of the Year Awards ==
Year	Recipient	Award	Result	Ref.
2008	Sugababes	Ultimate Mistresses of Music	Won	

== Disney Channel Kids Awards ==
Year	Recipient	Award	Result	Ref.
2004	"Hole in the Head"	Best Single	Won	

== Elle Style Awards ==
Year	Recipient	Award	Result	Ref.
2002	Sugababes	Music Star Award	Won	
2006	Sugababes	Music Star Award	Won	

== Eska Music Awards ==
Year	Recipient	Award	Result	Ref.
2006	Sugababes	Best World Group	Won	

== Glamour Awards ==
Year	Recipient	Award	Result	Ref.
2006	Sugababes	Band of the Year	Won	
2012	Sugababes	Band of the Year	Nominated	
2014	Mutya Keisha Siobhan	Band of the Year	Nominated	
2025	Sugababes	Women of the Year	Won	

== Ivor Novello Awards ==
Year	Nominee / work	Award	Result
2004	"Hole in the Head"	Most Performed Work	Nominated
2026	"Weeds"	Best Song Musically and Lyrically	Pending

== MOBO Awards ==
Year	Recipient	Award	Result	Ref.
2002	Sugababes	UK Act of the Year	Nominated	
2024	Sugababes	MOBO Impact Award	Won	

== MTV Europe Music Awards ==
Year	Recipient	Award	Result	Ref.
2001	"Soul Sound"	Best European Single	Nominated	
2001	Sugababes	Best UK and Ireland Act	Nominated	
2002	Sugababes	Best UK and Ireland Act	Nominated	

== Music Week Awards ==
Year	Nominee / work	Award	Result	Ref.
2022	Sugababes	Catalogue Marketing Campaign	Nominated	
2023	Sugababes	Inspirational Artist	Won	

== NME Awards ==
Year	Recipient	Award	Result	Ref.
2001	Sugababes	Best R&B/Soul Act	Nominated	

== Nickelodeon Kids' Choice Awards ==
Year	Recipient	Award	Result	Ref.
2007	Sugababes	Best Band	Nominated	

== Pop Factory Awards ==
Year	Recipient	Award	Result	Ref.
2002	Sugababes	Best Pop Act	Nominated	

== Popjustice £20 Music Prize ==
Year	Recipient	Award	Result	Ref.
2004	"Hole in the Head"	Best Pop Single	Nominated	
2006	"Push the Button"	Best Pop Single	Nominated	
2008	"About You Now"	Best Pop Single	Nominated	

== Q Awards ==
Year	Recipient	Award	Result
2002	"Freak like Me"	Best Single	Won

== Radio Forth Awards ==
Year	Recipient	Award	Result	Ref.
2009	Sugababes	Forth One Best Artist Award	Won	

== Smash Hits Poll Winners Party ==
Year	Recipient	Award	Result	Ref.
2000	Sugababes	Best New Band	Nominated	
2002	Sugababes	Best Band on Planet Pop	Nominated	
2002	Sugababes	Best UK Band	Nominated	
2002	"Round Round"	Best Single	Nominated	
2002	Angels with Dirty Faces	Best Album	Won	
2005	Taller in More Ways	Best Album	Nominated	
2005	"Push the Button"	Best Single	Nominated	
2005	"Push the Button"	Best Video	Nominated	
2005	Sugababes	Best UK Band	Nominated	

== TMF Awards ==
Year	Recipient	Award	Result
2004	Sugababes	Best International Pop Group	Won

== TOTP Awards ==
Year	Recipient	Award	Result	Ref.
2002	Sugababes	Best Pop Act	Nominated	
2005	"Push the Button"	Best Single	Won	

== Virgin Music Awards ==
Year	Recipient	Award	Result	Ref.
2007	"About You Now"	Best Track	Nominated	
2007	Sugababes	Best UK Act	Nominated	
