= Shook (Sugababes song) =

2025 song by Sugababes

Single by Sugababes
- Released: 9 July 2025
- Genre: Electropop; synth-pop
- Length: 2:56
- Label: Self-released
- Songwriters: Anya Jones; Jon Shave; Keisha Buchanan; Mutya Buena; Siobhán Donaghy
- Producers: Big Softy; Jon Shave

Sugababes singles chronology
| "Weeds" (2025) | "Shook" (2025) | "Ghost" (2026) |

Music video
- "Shook" on YouTube

"Shook" is a song by English girl group Sugababes. Written by the group, Anya Jones and Jon Shave, with production by the latter and Big Softy, it was self-released on 9 July 2025. It will be included on the group's self-titled upcoming ninth studio album, set for release in February 2027.

Described by the group as their "summer party banger", the song is an electropop and synth-pop track and was accompanied by a music video directed by Dora Paphides. Upon its release, "Shook" was well received by music critics, who praised the production value of the song, as well as the group for their harmonies and for "tapping into their core values" by "blending their trademark sound".

== Background and release ==
Following the release of "Jungle" in March 2025, the group announced during an interview with Clash magazine that more music would follow, with Mutya Buena suggesting there were "other singles that [they] were about to release". The following month, they released "Weeds", and embarked on their '25 Tour, which concluded in May.

Leading up to the release of "Shook" on 9 July 2025, the group teased the song via social media posts. Upon release, the group said: "From the moment we started writing and then putting the harmonies together, we knew it had to be a single." Released independently, distribution for the single is handled by the Orchard.

== Critical reception ==
In response to the release, DIY reviewed the song as electropop and heralded it a "surefire summer banger". In a review for Clash, Robin Murray referred to "Shook" as a "refreshing summer banger", while also referencing "femme pop energy". Dork noted the use of the group's harmonies, as well as the use of synths in its production. Philip Logan of CelebMix described the song as retro, fresh, and fierce.

== Commercial performance ==
After just two days worth of sales and streams, "Shook" debuted and peaked at number 13 on the UK Singles Sales Chart.

== Music video ==
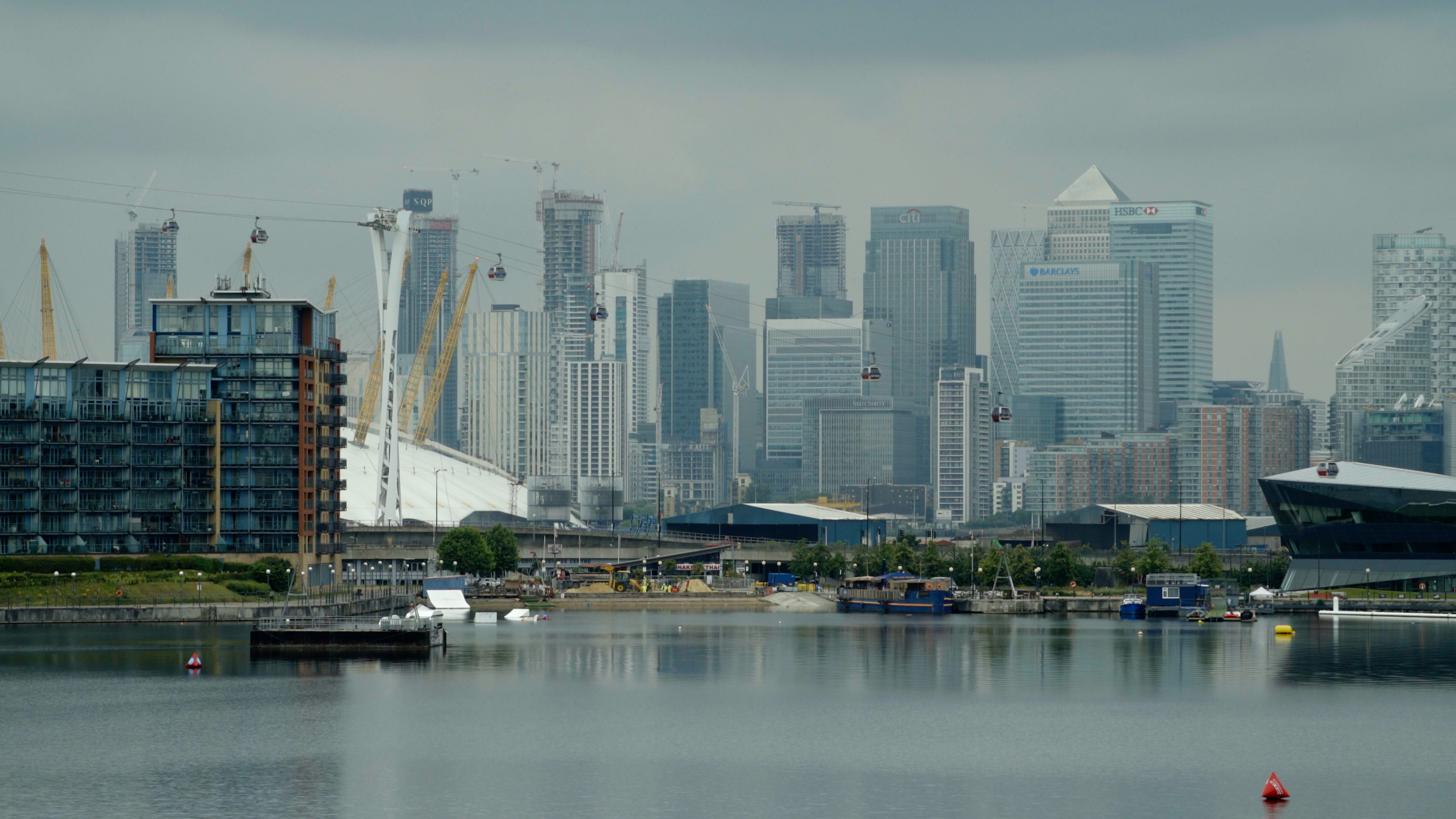
Looking west from the Royal Docks.

An accompanying music video for "Shook" was released on the same day as the single's release. Sugababes reunited with Dora Paphides, director of "Jungle" (2025), to film the video, which blends performances by the trio with "frantic lo-fi snapshots of city streets" along with a big white truck emblazoned with the Sugababes logo. Addressing her treamtment idea, Paphides declared the vehicle "more than a prop — it's a symbol. A moving monument to the band being cemented as icons. This truck barrels through the video like the band themselves: unmissable, larger-than-life, and impossible to ignore." Parts of the visuals were filmed at the Royal Docks in the London Borough of Newham, located in the London Docklands area of East London, with the Canary Wharf skyline providing a striking backdrop.

== Personnel ==
=== Musicians ===
Adapted via Tidal.

- Big Softy – producer
- Keisha Buchanan – vocals, writer
- Mutya Buena – vocals, writer
- Siobhán Donaghy – vocals, writer
- Anya Jones – writer
- Jon Shave – producer, writer

=== Music video ===
Adapted via YouTube.

- Director – Dora Paphides
- Production studio – kodemedia
- Producer – Lottie Lindsay-Beavan
- Production manager – Tara Leonard
- Production assistant – Azeen Porssa
- Head of production – Liz Dolan
- 1st AD – Rose Lucas
- 2nd AD – Billy French
- DOP – Tasha Duursma
- 1st AC – Alasdair Banes
- 2nd AC – Niels Halle
- Camera driver – Danial
- Grip – Dan Huntley
- Grip – Kieran Parkhouse
- Ronin tech – Henry Owen
- Gaffer – Christopher Broomfield
- Spark – Rob Shears
- Spark – Tina Georgieva
- Spark – Pete Musgrave
- Production designer – Hannah Knowles
- Art assist – Helena Hembrow
- Art trainee – Niamh Warren
- Runner – Billy Daisley
- Runner – Nicholas Finegan
- Runner – Emily Clayton
- Runner – Simon Semasaka
- Medic – Siu Lung Chen
- Movement director – Angelica Wolanska
- Movement assistant – Kane Klendjian
- Hair stylist – Devon Maz
- Hair stylist – Buki
- Hair stylist – Jason Goh
- Makeup – Roisin Donaghy
- Makeup – Georgina Graham
- Makeup assistant – Daniel Delgado
- Ortiz styling – Justin Hamilton
- Assistant – Lorna Lane
- Assistant – Katie Somavia
- Styling – Neil Stuart

== Charts ==
Chart performance
| Chart (2025) | Peak position |
|---|---|
| UK Singles Sales (OCC) | 13 |

== Release history ==
Release history
| Region | Date | Format | Label | Ref. |
|---|---|---|---|---|
| Various | 9 July 2025 | Digital download; streaming | Self-released | |
