= Sugababes 2027 UK Tour =

2027 concert tour by the Sugababes

- Tour by Sugababes
- Location: United Kingdom
- Associated album: Sugababes
- Start date: 16 March 2027
- End date: 27 March 2027
- No. of shows: 8

Sugababes concert chronology
- Sugababes '25 (2025); Sugababes 2027 UK Tour (2027)

The Sugababes 2027 UK Tour is the upcoming tenth concert tour by the English girl group Sugababes, with eight shows taking place in the United Kingdom throughout March 2027. The tour has been described by the group as "up close and personal", and is in support of their self-titled ninth studio album (2027). The tour will commence on 16 March 2027 in Birmingham, England, and will conclude on 27 March, in Manchester, England.

== Background ==
In September 2026, Sugababes announced their self-titled ninth studio album, set for release in February 2027, and released its lead single "Ghost". In October, the group announced an eight-date tour for March 2027, performing two consecutive shows each in Birmingham, Glasgow, London and Manchester. Commenting on the tour, the group described it as "up close and personal", and in celebration of their new album. Pre-sale access was granted to those who pre-ordered the album on 7 October, with general onsale commencing on 9 October.

== Tour dates ==
List of concerts
Date (2027)	City	Country	Venue
16 March	Birmingham	England	O_{2} Institute Birmingham
17 March	Birmingham	England	O_{2} Institute Birmingham
19 March	Glasgow	Scotland	O_{2} Academy Glasgow
20 March	Glasgow	Scotland	O_{2} Academy Glasgow
23 March	London	England	O_{2} Shepherd's Bush Empire
24 March	London	England	O_{2} Shepherd's Bush Empire
26 March	Manchester	England	Manchester Academy
27 March	Manchester	England	Manchester Academy
