= Ghost (Sugababes song) =

Single by Sugababes

from the album Sugababes
- Released: 24 September 2026
- Genre: Dance-pop
- Length: 3:37
- Label: Sacred Three
- Composers: Jon Shave; Keisha Buchanan; Mutya Buena; Siobhán Donaghy; Wayne Hector
- Producer: Jon Shave

Sugababes singles chronology
"Shook" (2025)	"Ghost" (2026)	"Love Language" (2026)

Music video
- "Ghost" on YouTube

"Ghost" is a song by the English girl group Sugababes, serving as the lead single from the group's upcoming self-titled ninth studio album. It was released on 24 September 2026, through Sacred Three. Written by the group in collaboration with Wayne Hector, and Jon Shave, who also handled production, it is a dance-pop track which lyrically explores the difficulty of letting someone go.

An associated music video was released for the song, which was directed by Thomas James. Commercially, the song reached the top ten on the UK Airplay Chart, and the top twenty-five on both the UK Singles Sales Chart and the UK Singles Downloads Chart. The group performed the song on the Graham Norton Show on 30 October 2026.

== Composition ==
"Ghost" is a dance-pop song, which lyrically was inspired by group member Siobhán Donaghy's experience of being "ghosted" by her first love. According to Attitude magazine, the song deals with "the difficulty of letting someone go while still being haunted by their presence". The song's production was intended to feel "scuzzy and imperfect", rather than over-produced, with the group believing this approach gave it additional character.

== Promotion ==
=== Music video ===
An accompanying music video for "Ghost" was filmed on location at St Giles' Church, Camberwell during the night, and was directed by Thomas James. It premiered at 17:00 BST on the evening of the song's release date. The video is themed around a funeral, where Donaghy and Buchanan are dressed in black, whilst Buena wears a red latex dress and a black fur jacket. It begins with a montage of parts of the video, before Buena begins the opening verse sat on the edge of an open grave in front of a gravestone. A funeral cortège with numerous dancers with red veils, revolving around a man who is scared and trapped alive inside a red coffin, is seen throughout the video, with the group leading the procession. In another part of the video, the dancers are seen carrying the coffin into the church. During the bridge of the song, the group are seen standing at the edge of the grave as the dancers lower the coffin into the ground. In another scene, the funeral director is seen opening her hand with a key in her palm. The video concludes with the bewildered man escaping the coffin and climbing out of the grave, by which point the group and the dancers have already left the cemetery.

=== Live performances ===
The group first performed "Ghost" as part of their setlist at the Attitude Awards on 7 October 2026. On 30 October, they performed the song on the Graham Norton Show. At Hits Radio Live on 20 November, the group performed "Ghost" as part of their setlist.

== Commercial performance ==
"Ghost" debuted at number 22 on the UK Singles Sales Chart on 2 October 2026, while reaching number 19 on the UK Singles Downloads Chart that same week. Following the group's performance of the song on the Graham Norton Show on 30 October, the song returned to its peak position on both charts for a second non-consecutive week. The song was added to BBC Radio 2's A-List Playlist for the week beginning 10 October 2026. It debuted at number nine on the UK Airplay Chart on 16 October 2026.

== Credits and personnel ==
Credits are adapted from Apple Music.

- Keisha Buchanan – vocals, vocal producer
- Siobhán Donaghy – vocals, vocal producer
- Mutya Buena – vocals, vocal producer
- Jon Shave – producer, lyrics, recording engineer, programming, keyboards
- Dylan Cooper – programming, keyboards
- Wayne Hector – lyrics
- Geoff Swan – mixing engineer
- Matt Cahill – assistant mixing engineer
- Chris Gehringer – mastering engineer
- Anya Jones – associate producer

== Charts ==
Chart performance
Chart (2026)	Peak position
UK Singles Sales (OCC)	22
UK Airplay (Radiomonitor)	9

== Release history ==
Release history
Region	Date	Format	Label	Ref.
Various	24 September 2026	Digital download; streaming	Sacred Three	
Italy	24 September 2026	Radio airplay	Sacred Three	
