= Jungle (Sugababes song) =

2025 song by Sugababes

Single by Sugababes
- Released: 13 March 2025
- Genre: House-pop; synth-pop
- Length: 2:40
- Label: Self-released
- Songwriters: Jon Shave; Anya Jones; Keisha Buchanan; Mutya Buena; Siobhán Donaghy; Wayne Hector
- Producer: Jon Shave

Sugababes singles chronology
"Situation" (2024)	"Jungle" (2025)	"Weeds" (2025)

Music video
- "Jungle" on YouTube

"Jungle" is a song by English girl group Sugababes. Written by the trio, Jon Shave, Anya Jones, and Wayne Hector and produced by Shave, it was self-released on 13 March 2025. It will be included on the group's self-titled upcoming ninth studio album, set for release in February 2027.

Lyrically, the song is about "escaping the 9-5 grind" and musically was described as a house-pop and synth-pop track. The song was accompanied by a music video directed by Dora Paphides. Upon its release, "Jungle" received praise from music critics, who compared the song to the group's early work and favoured its production.

== Background and release ==
Following the release of the Sugababes' single "When the Rain Comes" in September 2023, speculation began as to when the group would release further new musics and a possible next album. They went on to release remixed versions of their singles "Push the Button" and Round Round" with Joy Anonymous and Two Shell respectively, titled "Joy (Push the Button)" (2023) and "Round" (2024). In May 2024, the group said their upcoming ninth studio album was in its "finishing stages". They subsequently went on to release a collaborative single "Situation" alongside A Little Sound in August 2024, which interpolates the chorus from the group's debut 2000 single "Overload" and features updated lyrics.

In March 2025, while appeared on the 2025 Brit Awards, Siobhán Donaghy stated the group would be releasing new music "sooner than [people] might think". The following week on 7 March, Sugababes announced the single on social media. The song was released on 13 March, and made its debut on The Radio 2 Breakfast Show with Scott Mills. The group performed the song live the song for the first time during Comic Relief on 21 March 2025, alongside a medley of their other songs. Released independently, distribution for the single is handled by the Orchard. Musically, the song has been described as a house-pop and synth-pop number that incorporates elements of 2-step, garage and alternative pop. The group described the lyrics as being "about escaping the 9-5 grind".

== Music video ==
An accompanying music video for "Jungle" was directed by Dora Paphides and released alongside the single on 13 March. The video takes place in what is seemingly an empty warehouse and begins with a man receiving a tattoo of the Sugababes' logo, which is shown at various points throughout the video until its completion at the end. Donaghy appears first on a treadmill from inside a smaller room with blue walls, before Buchanan sings her verse surrounded by music speakers. Buena, who is wearing sunglasses whilst pieces of paper are being blown by a wind machine, subsequently performs the pre-chorus before the group are seen together performing choreography. Donaghy and Buchanan are seen walking along a runway in the style of an illuminated dance floor with white tiles as the former performs a spoken verse with harmonies from the latter. They eventually reach Buena, who repeats the pre-chorus. The group perform further choreography during the chorus and are subsequently joined by backing dancers. During the video, various objects are featured such as a water dispenser with cups and a stack of chairs floating in the air. The video was described by Thomas Atkinson of IndustryMe as "minimalistic", while also noting it "still [allowed] each member to have their moment while showcasing the wildness and fun the song itself displays".

== Reception ==
Daisy Carter of DIY magazine described "Jungle" as a "pulsing, dancefloor-ready number", adding it was a "powerhouse return" for the group. Writing for Clash magazine, Robin Murray described the song an "epic synth-pop banger" that is etched in [the group's] formidable DNA [...] also describing it as "an instant classic". Atkinson of IndustryMe reviewed the song as a "bouncy house-pop production that immediately has you hooked", as well as "a bop in every sense of the word, with great harmonies, a catchy chorus, and a track that is so much fun".

== Live performances ==
On 21 March 2025, the group performed "Jungle" for the first time, alongside a medley of their hits, at that year's Comic Relief, shown live on BBC One. On 27 March 2025, they performed the single on Ireland's The Late Late Show.

== Chart performance ==
On 21 March 2025, the single debuted at number 15 on both the UK Singles Sales and UK Singles Downloads charts; "Jungle" spent two weeks each on both charts.

== Charts ==
Chart performance
Chart (2025)	Peak position
UK Singles Sales (OCC)	15

== Release history ==
Release history
Region	Date	Format	Label	Ref.
Various	13 March 2025	Digital download; streaming	Self-released	
