= Sugababes =

English girl group

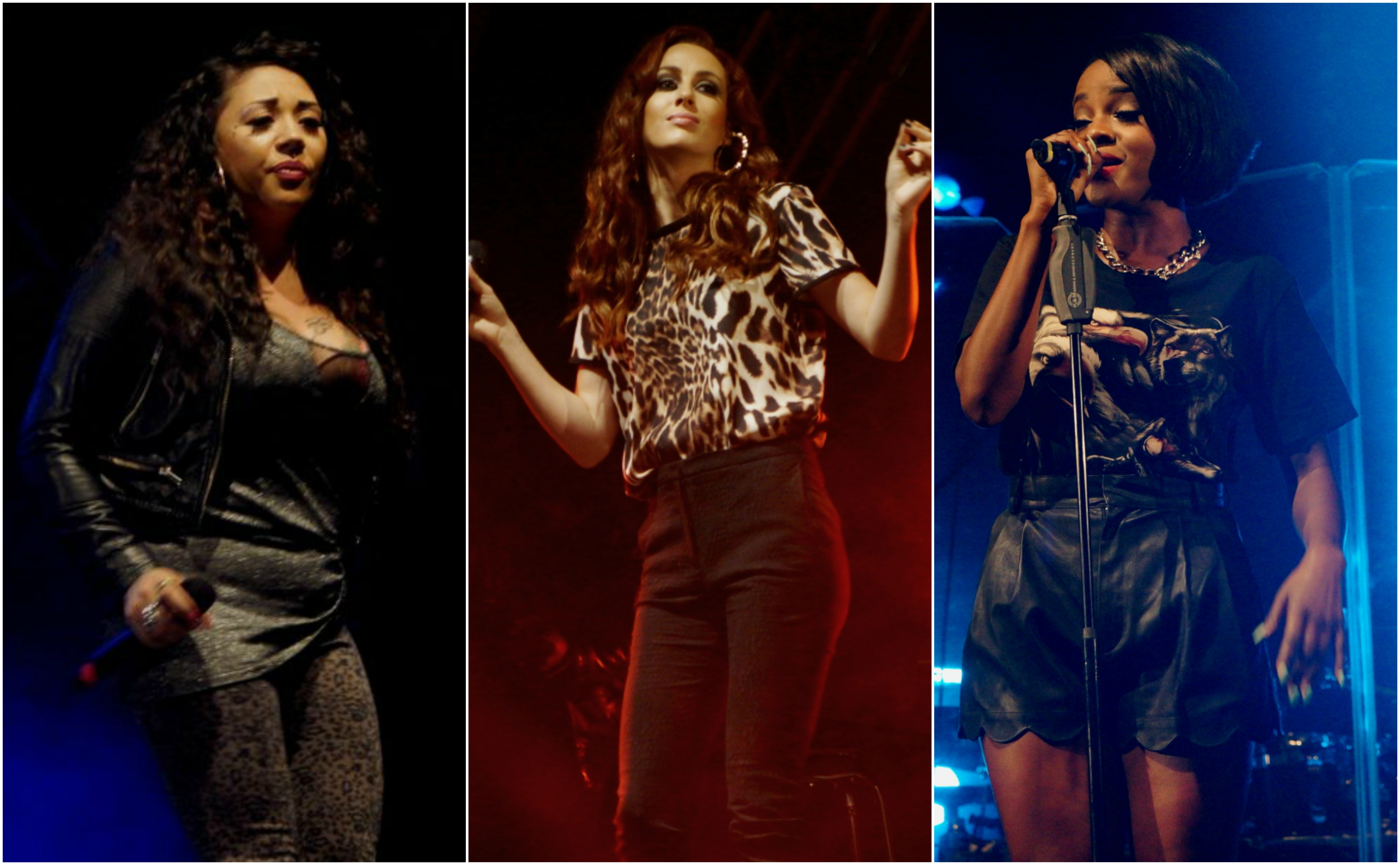
- From left to right: Buena, Donaghy and Buchanan performing at Manchester Pride in 2013

Background information
- Also known as: Mutya Keisha Siobhán (2011–2019)
- Origin: London, England
- Genres: Pop; R&B
- Years active: 1998–present
- Labels: London; Island; RCA; Roc Nation; Polydor; BMG
- Members: Mutya Buena; Keisha Buchanan; Siobhán Donaghy
- Past members: Heidi Range; Amelle Berrabah; Jade Ewen
- Website: sugababesofficial.com

Sugababes are an English girl group formed in 1998, consisting of Mutya Buena, Keisha Buchanan, and Siobhán Donaghy. They released their debut album, One Touch, through London Records in 2000. It achieved moderate success and produced the UK top-ten single "Overload". In 2001, Donaghy left the group and was replaced by Heidi Range. With this lineup, the group released three multi-platinum albums: Angels with Dirty Faces (2002), Three (2003), and Taller in More Ways (2005), the latter of which became their first number one album on the UK Albums Chart. The lead single from Taller in More Ways, "Push the Button", reached number one in multiple countries. In December 2005, Buena left the group and was replaced by Amelle Berrabah, after which they released their first greatest hits album, Overloaded: The Singles Collection (2006). Their fifth studio album, Change (2007), earned the group their second number one album in the UK, and its lead single, "About You Now", became their bestselling song in the country. Their sixth studio album, Catfights and Spotlights (2008), produced the UK top-three single "Girls".

In August 2009, Sugababes released the single "Get Sexy", which reached number two on the UK charts. In September 2009, after 11 years in Sugababes, Buchanan, the final original member, was replaced by Jade Ewen. The group subsequently released their seventh studio album, Sweet 7 (2010), after which they signed to RCA Records, before taking an indefinite hiatus in 2011 following the release of their single "Freedom". That year, the original lineup re-formed as Mutya Keisha Siobhán and released the single "Flatline" in 2013, to moderate commercial success. The trio regained the name rights to use the Sugababes name in 2019, and in 2021, they rereleased One Touch for its 20th anniversary. In December 2022, they released The Lost Tapes, an album of previously unreleased leaked material. In 2025, the group independently released the singles "Jungle", "Weeds" and "Shook", and embarked on the Sugababes '25 Tour, their first arena tour. Sugababes are set to release their self-titled ninth studio album in February 2027.

Sugababes have achieved six number-one singles in the UK: "Freak Like Me", "Round Round", "Hole in the Head", "Push the Button", "Walk This Way", and "About You Now". They have also released five UK top-ten albums, four of which are certified platinum in the UK. Three of their studio albums are amongst the top ten best selling girl-group albums of all time in the UK. The group have been nominated for six Brit Awards, winning for Best British Dance Act in 2003. Sugababes have been regarded as one of the best girl groups of all time by Teen Vogue, with their song "Freak Like Me" being ranked as the 45th best girl-group song of all time by Billboard.

== History ==
=== 1998–2001: One Touch and Donaghy's departure ===
Sugababes were formed in 1998 by All Saints manager Ron Tom and Sarah Stennett, and First Access Entertainment. Siobhán Donaghy and Mutya Buena, both aged just 13, had been signed as solo artists, but decided to work together after performing at the same showcase. While working in the studio, Buena invited her best friend Keisha Buchanan to watch them. Manager Ron Tom decided the three girls were to be a trio, likening their different appearances to the United Colors of Benetton campaign. Originally dubbed the Sugababies, the group's name was tweaked to Sugababes when they were signed by London Records to give the group a more mature image.

The group's debut single, "Overload", peaked at number 6 on the UK Singles Chart in 2000 and was nominated for a BRIT Award for Best Single. The group co-wrote most of the tracks on debut album One Touch with the help of All Saints producer Cameron McVey. One Touch peaked at number 26 on the UK Albums Chart. The album produced three more top 40 hits—"New Year", "Run for Cover" and "Soul Sound". The sales of One Touch did not meet London Records' expectations, and they dropped the group in 2001. It was later certified Gold by the BPI and had sold 220,000 copies in the UK by 2008 according to Music Week.

During a Japanese promotional tour in August 2001, Donaghy left the group. She stated initially that she wanted to pursue a fashion career, but was eventually diagnosed with clinical depression amid reports of in-fighting amongst the group's members. Donaghy later stated that she was forced out of the group by Buchanan and called Buchanan the "first bully" in her life. Former Atomic Kitten member Heidi Range replaced Donaghy.

=== 2002–2004: Angels with Dirty Faces and Three ===
Having already started work on a second album with new member Range, the trio looked for a new record label, eventually signing to Island Records. Their first single on the new label, "Freak like Me" scored the group their first UK number 1 single. Follow-up single "Round Round" also debuted on top of the UK Singles Chart and peaked at number 2 in Ireland, the Netherlands and New Zealand. Both singles were certified silver by the BPI. On the back of the success of the singles, the group's second album, Angels with Dirty Faces, debuted at number 2 on the UK Albums Chart and was later certified triple Platinum, selling almost a million copies in the UK alone. It is to date their highest-selling album. In the UK, the third single from the album, a ballad titled "Stronger", gained the girls their third consecutive top ten hit in their native country. The track was released as a double-A side with "Angels with Dirty Faces" in the UK, the latter song chosen as the theme tune to The Powerpuff Girls Movie. A fourth single, the Sting-sampling "Shape", made the top ten in the Netherlands and Ireland in early 2003.

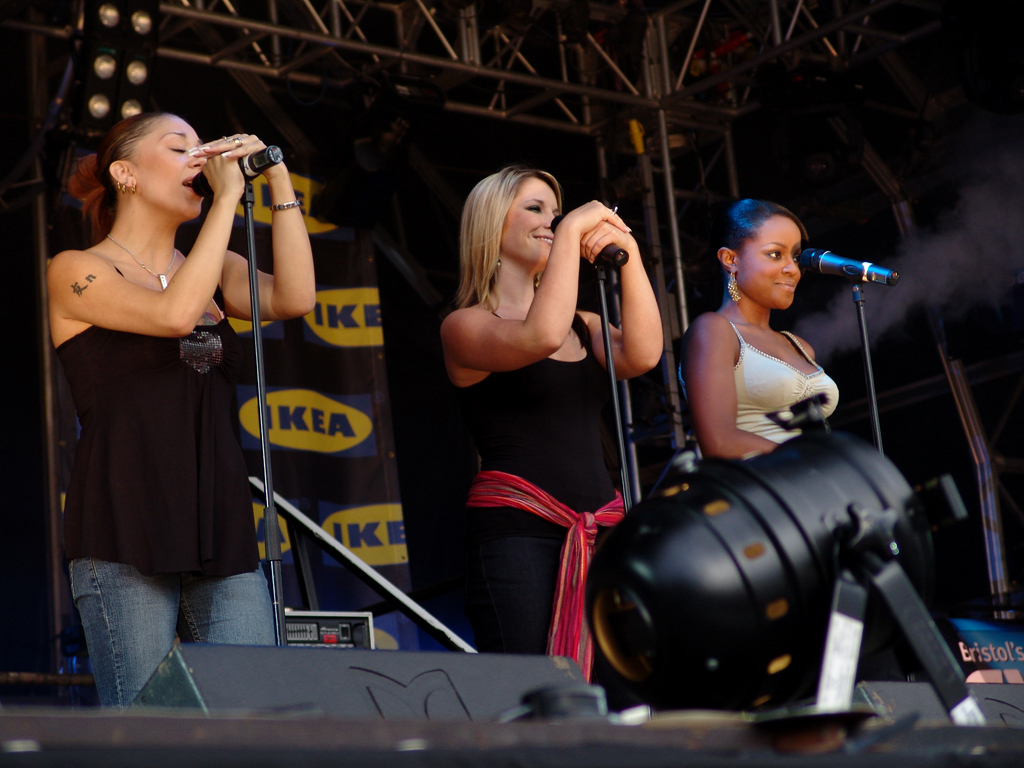
The second Sugababes line-up in May 2005.

The group's third album, Three, was released in late 2003 and reached number 3 on the UK Albums Chart, earning the group a BRIT Award nomination for Best Album. Certified double Platinum, it has sold 855,000 copies to date. The album was preceded by lead single "Hole in the Head", which became the group's third UK number 1 single. It also reached number 2 in Ireland, the Netherlands and Norway, and became the Sugababes' first (and to date only) single to chart in the United States, reaching number 96 on the Billboard Hot 100. Follow-up single "Too Lost in You" appeared on the soundtrack to the film Love Actually and went top ten in Germany, the Netherlands, Norway and the UK. The album's third single, "In the Middle", was released in 2004 and garnered the group another BRIT Award nomination for Best Single; like its successor, the ballad "Caught in a Moment", it went to number 8 on the UK Singles Chart. In 2004, the trio sang on the Band Aid 20 remake of "Do They Know It's Christmas?", which went to number 1 in the UK in December.

Around this time, the group's perceived "moodiness", alleged backstage catfights, and press junket tantrums were tabloid fodder in Britain. They were surrounded by continuous rumours of in-fighting within the group and constant split reports. Rumours suggested that Buchanan and Buena had bullied Range, although Range herself repeatedly denied such allegations; Buena later admitted that she did not speak to Range when she first joined. According to Buchanan, there was only one serious fallout between herself and Range during a 2004 gig in Dublin, a disagreement around Britney Spears's song "Toxic".

=== 2005–2006: Taller in More Ways, Buena's departure, and compilation ===
After a hiatus, during which Buena gave birth to her daughter Thalia, the Sugababes released their thirteenth single, "Push the Button" in October 2005. The song debuted at number 1 in the UK and remained in the position for three consecutive weeks. It also peaked at number one in Ireland, Austria and New Zealand, and reached the top three across Europe and in Australia. Certified silver in the UK, it was later nominated at the BRIT Awards for Best Single. Parent album Taller in More Ways became the group's first UK number 1 album. The group was number 1 on the singles, album, airplay and download charts simultaneously, making them the first girl group to achieve such a feat. Taller in More Ways was certified triple platinum in the UK.

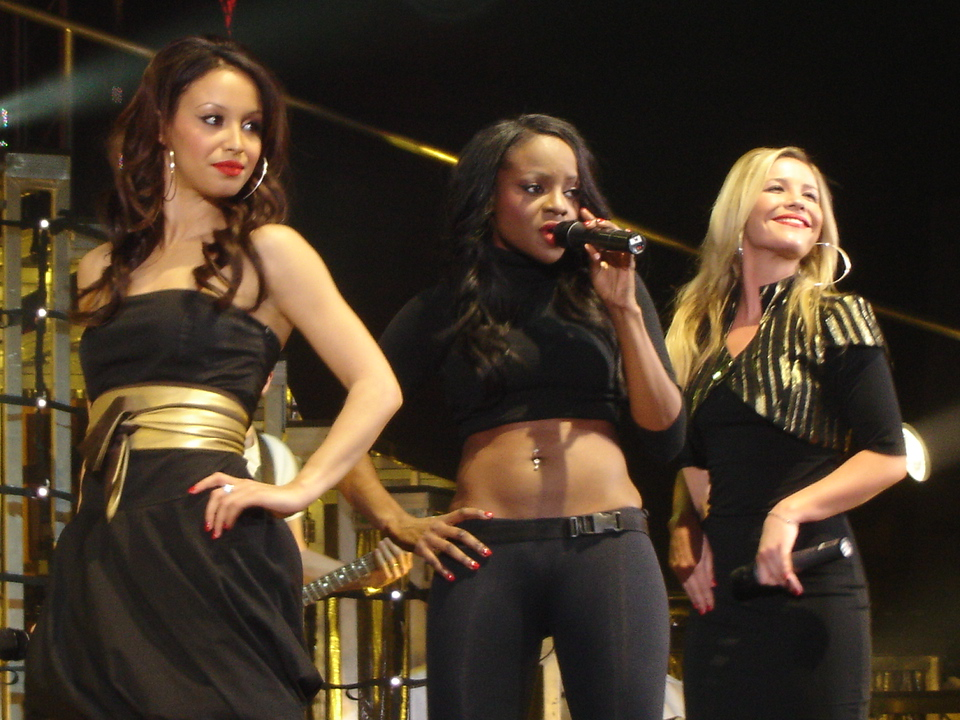
The third line-up of the Sugababes in April 2006.

Following an illness that prevented her from promoting follow-up single "Ugly", Buena left the Sugababes on 21 December 2005. Buena later stated that she was suffering from postnatal depression after the birth of her daughter combined with the group's increasingly hectic schedules, and chose to leave to spend more time with her daughter. Amelle Berrabah joined the Sugababes in late December 2005, having been chosen by the group's management as a replacement. Prior to Buena's departure, the group recorded the track "Spiral" from the William Orbit album, Hello Waveforms, which was released in February 2006.

The third single from Taller in More Ways was a re-recorded version of "Red Dress", which was released in early 2006, and gave the Sugababes their third consecutive top five hit from the album, entering the UK Singles Chart at number 4. Berrabah re-recorded three of the album's twelve tracks and co-wrote a new song with Buchanan and Range named "Now You're Gone". The tracks appeared on a re-release of Taller in More Ways that reached number 18 on the UK Albums Chart. The fourth and final single from Taller in More Ways was "Follow Me Home", released only in the UK in June, where it charted at number 32.

In mid-2006, the group returned to the studio to record two new tracks for their first greatest hits collection, titled Overloaded: The Singles Collection. The lead single from the compilation, "Easy" peaked at number 8 on the UK Singles Chart, whilst the compilation album, released in November 2006, peaked at number 3. The album, certified double Platinum by the BPI, has sold over 600,000 copies. During this time, the group had also begun work on their fifth studio album.

=== 2007–2008: Change and Catfights and Spotlights ===
In March 2007, the Sugababes collaborated with fellow British girl group Girls Aloud for their eighteenth single, a cover of the song "Walk This Way" by Aerosmith. The track was released as the official single for Comic Relief. "Walk This Way" became the group's fifth UK number one single.

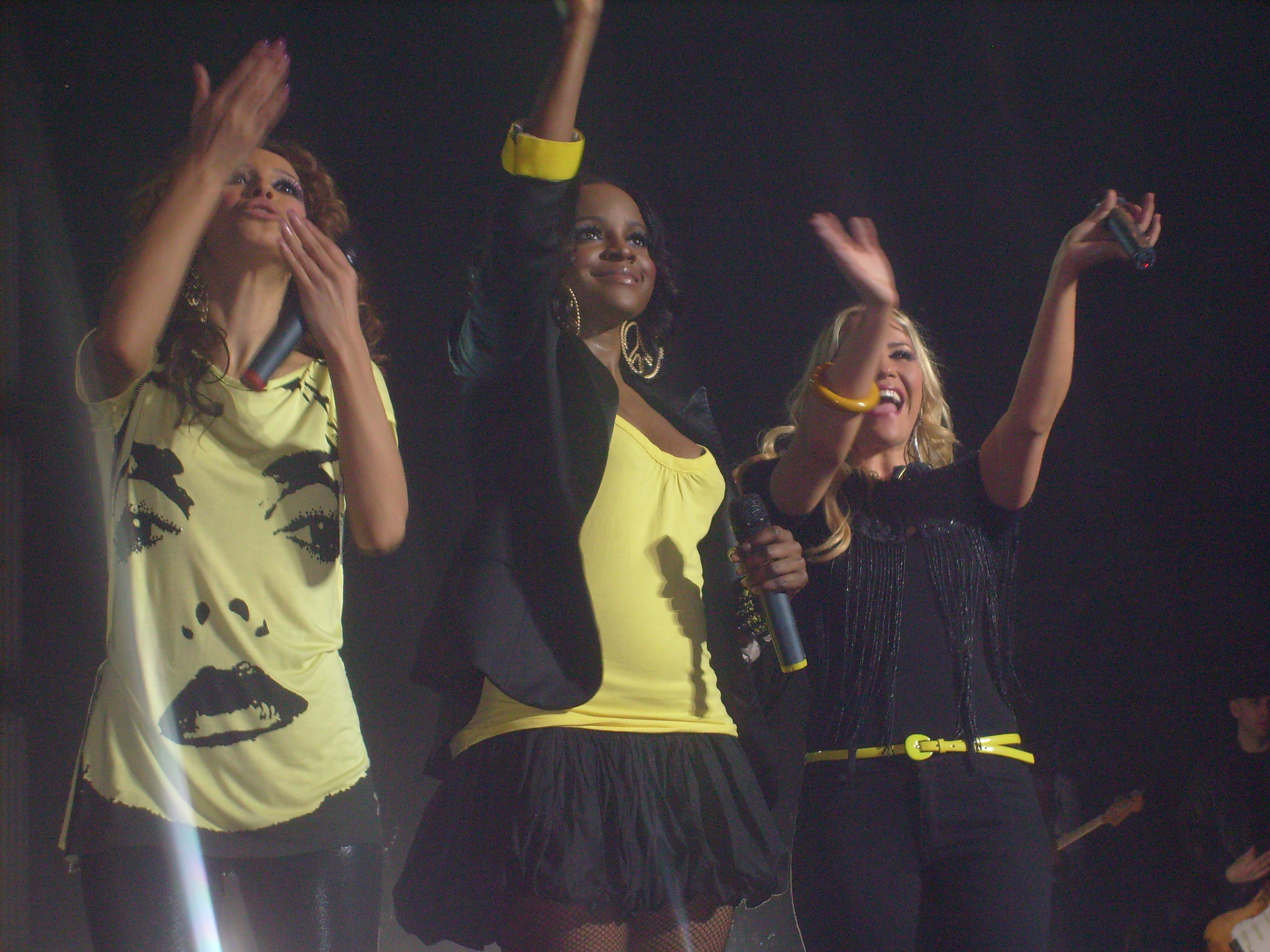
The third Sugababes line-up in April 2008 on the Change Tour, their largest-scale tour

Following their Greatest Hits Tour, the Sugababes returned to the recording studio in mid-2007 to continue working on Change, their fifth studio album, and the first to feature Berrabah on all tracks. "About You Now" was released as the album's lead single in September 2007. Upon release, the song became the group's sixth UK number one hit and first Hungarian chart-topper. It remained atop the UK Singles Chart for four weeks. "About You Now" was nominated for a 2008 BRIT Award for Best British Single and is to date their highest-selling single, with sales standing at almost 500,000 copies. In the 2009 edition of the Guinness Book of World Records, "About You Now" was listed as the "first track by a British pop act to top the singles chart solely on downloads". The song was also named as the "biggest chart mover to the number one position in the UK".

In October 2007, Change became the group's second UK number 1 album. For the second time, the group topped the singles, album and download charts simultaneously. The album's title track "Change", was released as the second single in December 2007 and peaked at number 13 in the UK. The album sold 494,000 copies in the UK, and was certified Platinum. The third and final single from Change was "Denial", which reached number 15. From March to May 2008, the Sugababes travelled the UK on the thirty-date Change Tour, their biggest tour to date.

Following the Change Tour, Sugababes returned to the studio to write and record tracks for their sixth studio album, Catfights and Spotlights. It was reported that producer Timbaland had approached the Sugababes to work on their sixth album, but due to time restrictions, a collaboration did not occur. "Girls", the lead single from Catfights and Spotlights was released in October 2008. The single peaked at number 3 in the UK, making it their first lead single since One Touch not to reach number 1. The album peaked at number 8 in the UK Albums Chart. Its second and final single, "No Can Do", was released in December and peaked at number 23 in the UK. The Performing Right Society named Sugababes the fourth-hardest-working band of 2008 due to the number of concerts they had performed during that year.

=== 2009–2010: Buchanan's departure and Sweet 7 ===
After the release of "No Can Do", the group decided not to go on tour in 2009 and instead focus on writing and recording material for their seventh studio album. The Sugababes travelled to the United States to work on their seventh studio album, Sweet 7. In April 2009, the Sugababes signed a contract with Jay-Z's label Roc Nation, resulting in working with high profile producers. Berrabah also collaborated with Tinchy Stryder for the track "Never Leave You", the third single from his second album, Catch 22, in August 2009. The single debuted on top of the UK charts, making Berrabah the only member of the Sugababes, past and present, to achieve a number one single outside of the group. The lead single from Sweet 7, "Get Sexy", debuted at number 2 on the UK Singles Chart in September 2009. In September 2009, Berrabah was reported to have left the Sugababes as she had missed two engagements promoting Sweet 7. It was also rumored that Jade Ewen, the UK's 2009 Eurovision Song Contest entrant, would be joining the group and replacing Berrabah. On 21 September, it was revealed that Buchanan, the sole remaining original member of the group, had departed from the Sugababes and replaced by Ewen. Buchanan revealed on Twitter that it was not her decision to leave, resulting in some journalists describing her as having been "sacked".

I'm sad to say that I am no longer a part of the Sugababes ... Although it was not my choice to leave, it's time to enter a new chapter in my life ... I would like to state that there were no arguments, bullying or anything of the sort that lead [sic] to this. Sometimes a breakdown in communication and lack of trust can result in many different things.

— Keisha Buchanan, September 2009

Critics and fans reacted very negatively to the news, and The Guardian published an article titled "Why the Sugababes' show can't go on without Keisha". Digital Spy ran an article titled "Keisha Buchanan, We Salute You" in which they thanked her for her contribution to "incredible pop songs". According to Berrabah and Range, both women had wanted to quit the Sugababes themselves and alleged that Buchanan had become too difficult to work with, so their group's management decided that they would follow them rather than find two new members for Buchanan. Buchanan stated in 2020 that she did not know that she was ousted from the group until after her departure had been made public.

The new member, Ewen, was flown to the United States to film the music video for single "About a Girl" mere days after Buchanan had left the group. "About a Girl" reached number 8 in the UK, during a truncated promotion schedule due to Berrabah flying to Austria for treatment for nervous exhaustion resulting from the line-up change. They released their cover of "Santa Baby" on 21 December 2009. In late 2009, "Wear My Kiss" was confirmed for release in February 2010 as the third single, with the album, originally set for a late November 2009 release, delayed until March 2010. "Wear My Kiss" debuted and peaked at number 7 in the UK, making Sweet 7 the Sugababes' first album since Taller in More Ways to contain at least three top ten hits. The album debuted and peaked at number 14 in the UK but was critically panned due to the loss of an identifiable sound, soul and originality stemming from Buchanan's departure.

In March 2010, former group member Mutya Buena applied to the European Trademarks Authority for ownership of the group's name. The application was submitted amid the controversy of Buchanan's departure, in which Buena insisted that "the Sugababes have ended" without a founding member still in the group. It was confirmed that Buena had obtained rights to use the name on paper, cardboard and goods; namely stationery, paper gift wrap and paper gift wrapping ribbons. In the same month the group was dropped by Roc Nation, due to poor sales of Sweet 7.

=== 2011: Cancelled album and disbandment ===
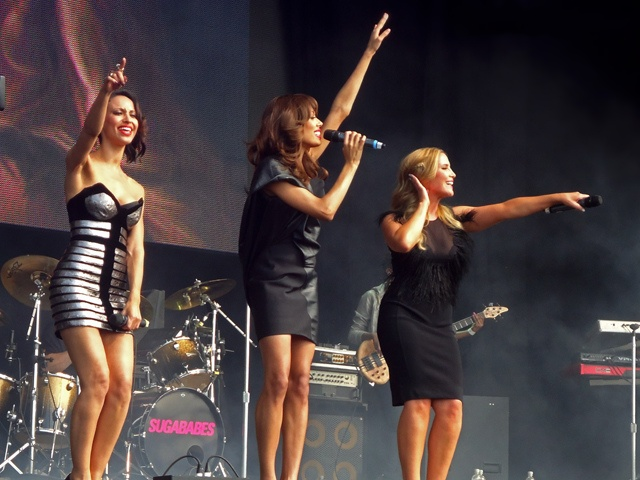
The fourth Sugababes line-up performing at Chester Rocks in July 2011, prior to their hiatus

The Sugababes initially began recording an eighth studio album in April 2010. In June 2011, the group and their managers Sarah Stennett and Mark Hargreaves Crown Music Management Services left their record label of ten years, Island Records, for a new three-album distribution deal with Sony Music's RCA Records, with Crown Music Management Services as the acting record label. In July, the Sugababes commented on their new album, saying: "It's a bit darker, tougher and quite edgy." In another interview, the group stated the new album showcased their personalities. At the Wireless Festival in London, Buchanan and the current line-up were reported to have had a "teary" reunion and put the past behind them. It was the first time in two years that she had seen Range and Berrabah, as well as the first time she had officially met her "replacement" Jade Ewen. In a later interview, Buchanan said that she was disappointed by the treatment she received back in 2009, but went on to wish the current line-up "the best of luck".

Their first and only single under the new label, "Freedom", was released for free on 25 September 2011. Afterward, the group began a hiatus to work on solo projects: Range participated in the seventh series of Dancing on Ice, Berrabah worked on solo material and Ewen competed as a contestant on the first series of Splash!

In March 2013, Ewen stated that the Sugababes would likely reform to record new music by the end of the year; though with no set release date, and in May, Berrabah said the group had been writing songs for their new album and hoped to release new music in 2014. However, later the same year, Ewen stated that they were "pretty much done". This was initially denied by Berrabah, who stated she believed the band would get back together in late 2014. In September 2013, Ewen reaffirmed that the group had split two years prior, saying "We kind of fizzled out about two years ago. I do think the lineup changes have obviously got to be a factor, you can't get away from it." In January 2014, Range contradicted Ewen's statement, saying that the group was merely on hiatus to pursue solo projects. However, she later admitted in a June 2020 interview that the group had conceded in 2011 that it would not be fair for them to continue further due to the controversy and their declining popularity after Buchanan's departure.

In March 2019, Berrabah revealed that the Sugababes had been approached several times about reforming for a farewell tour for the fans. In July, in an interview with Irish broadcaster RTÉ, she said that there were discussions about a reunion tour featuring all six members of the group.

=== 2011–2018: Original lineup re-formation as Mutya Keisha Siobhán ===
Buchanan was contacted in June 2010, just nine months after being ousted, about potentially getting back with Buena and Donaghy. In October 2011, several news outlets reported that the original line-up of the Sugababes would reform. both Buena and Buchanan tweeted in January 2012 that they were in the studio with "two other females" and British rapper Professor Green, fuelling further speculation that the group would reunite were sparked. Buena later denied this on Twitter. Despite this, Scottish singer-songwriter Emeli Sandé confirmed to MTV UK that she had written new songs for Buena, Buchanan and Donaghy.

In April 2012, it was reported that the line-up had signed a £1 million record deal with Polydor Records. In July 2012, it was confirmed that the group had reformed under the name Mutya Keisha Siobhán and were working on a new album under Polydor. The name was officially registered through the European Union on 27 June 2012. The group attended the 2012 Summer Olympics opening ceremony on 27 July 2012 and posted pictures on their official Instagram page, marking the trio's first public appearance together in eleven years. On 6 August, the group confirmed they had written two songs with Shaznay Lewis, member of the All Saints. The next day, Donaghy tweeted "With the girls in the studio. I think the album is finished!!!" Their return was named the eleventh biggest moment of 2012 in NME's '75 Moments That Defined 2012' countdown.

The group appeared on the cover of fashion magazine Ponystep in December 2012. That same month, they performed an intimate gig at Ponystep's New Year's Eve party. The performance marked the first time Buena, Buchanan and Donaghy had performed together in over a decade. On 7 January 2013, the group uploaded a short a cappella clip of "Boys" on Buchanan's YouTube account. The same day, Popjustice released a three-second clip of its studio version. The group signed with Storm Model Management. On 14 March, the group's producer Dev Hynes uploaded "Lay Down in Swimming Pools" on his official SoundCloud page, a reinterpretation of Kendrick Lamar's "Swimming Pools (Drank)" that features the group. On 26 March, the group featured on a remix of Phoenix's single "Entertainment". The group released the single "Flatline" in June 2013. The track experienced moderate commercial success, peaking at number 50 in the UK. MKS performed their first official headlining gig at Scala on 1 August. In early October, Mutya Keisha Siobhán appeared on the Google+ Sessions series. On 6 November 2013, Buena said that she was open to reclaiming the Sugababes name. During 8–16 November 2013, the group embarked on the Sacred Three Tour, playing six dates across the UK. On 24 February 2014, the Sugababes attended the NME Awards 2014 where they performed alongside Metronomy, "Love Letters", a single by the latter group. On 13 February 2015, the group released the single "Back in the Day", their first new material since "Flatline".

In June 2016, at London Pride's WandsworthRadio special, Donaghy said the album was due the following year. In August 2017, Buchanan said in an interview that the group were working on new material after their previous work was leaked online. In June 2018, Donaghy was a guest on Tom Aspaul's podcast Battle Pop and revealed "We're still working together. That's really easy to [say] and reassure fans. We're kind of stronger than ever." She added that she had no idea when, or even if, an album would be released.

=== 2019–2024: Reclaiming the Sugababes name and The Lost Tapes ===
Buchanan, Buena and Donaghy won back the rights to the group name Sugababes in 2019. Later that year, the group appeared with DJ Spoony on his album Garage Classical, covering the 2000 song "Flowers" by Sweet Female Attitude. This marked the group's first release under the name Sugababes after eight years of working as Mutya Keisha Siobhán. Their comeback performance took place on The Graham Norton Show on 18 October 2019. Following their performance on Graham Norton's show, the group revealed that they were working on new music and a 20th anniversary project; however, plans were put on hold due to the COVID-19 pandemic. On 11 May 2021, Sugababes released a reworking of 2001 single "Run for Cover" featuring MNEK. followed by a Blood Orange remix "Same Old Story", a track from their One Touch album, on 22 June 2021. On 1 October 2021 they released an expanded 20 Year Anniversary edition of One Touch, including unheard demos and remixes. The album peaked at number 18 on the UK Albums Chart, outperforming the original peak of 26. Sugababes headlined the second day of June 2022's "Mighty Hoopla" festival in Herne Hill, London. The band supported Westlife on the Dublin leg of their and appeared on a number of music festivals over the summer, including Glastonbury (where the field had to be shut down due to the huge crowd), Portsmouth's Victorious Festival and the Margate Pride Festival. On 3 June 2022, the 2013 Mutya Keisha Siobhan single, "Flatline", was re-released under the Sugababes name. In October/November 2022, the Sugababes performed on a 17-date headlining tour, starting in Bristol and concluding in Glasgow.

On 24 December 2022, Sugababes independently surprise-released the album The Lost Tapes. The album was originally recorded in 2013 but never received an official release. The group stated online: "We wrote this album almost 8 years ago and for various reasons it didn't get an official release, so it's with great pride that The Lost Tapes is available now on all streaming platforms". The Lost Tapes debuted at number 2 on the UK Album Downloads Chart Top 100.

In February 2023, the Sugababes toured Australia, their first headlining tour of the country. The band supported Take That at BST Hyde Park on 1 July 2023 alongside the Script.

On 15 September 2023, Sugababes released the single "When the Rain Comes". The song was the first single to be released by the band's then-new record label BMG. On the same day, they performed their one-night stand at The O2 Arena in London, which was their biggest headline performance to date. In December 2023, the group featured on the Joy Anonymous remix "Push the Button", titled "JOY (Push the Button)". The band appeared on Jools' Annual Hootenanny on 31 December 2023. Sugababes were awarded the "Impact Award" at the 26th MOBO Awards, and continued to appear at various events and festivals throughout 2024, including Parklife, Capital's Summertime Ball, Glastonbury Festival for which they appeared on the West Holts stage (once again shutting down the stage due to demand), as well as TRNSMT, Rock Oyster, Belladrum Tartan Heart Festival, Kendal Calling, Siren Bristol, Victorious Festival and Lowlands in the Netherlands. They also performed at the UEFA Euro 2024 final in Berlin. In August 2024, Sugababes featured on the remix "Round" by Two Shell, which sampled their single "Round Round". The same month, the group were a headlining act at Manchester Pride. On 30 August 2024, the group released the single "Situation", a collaboration with A Little Sound which uses the chorus from "Overload", alongside new lyrics for the verses. A visual was released on the same day. On 8 September 2024, they performed at BBC Radio 2 in the Park. In October 2024, they announced on The One Show that they had begun work on their ninth studio album. In the interview, they also spoke about their "full comeback" after reclaiming their original name, and what it's like to work together again as adults after forming the group as teenagers, as well as promoting their UK and European arena tour, Sugababes '25. They also touched on their single "When the Rain Comes" and their previous song "Flatline" from their 2013 MKS era. On 31 December 2024, they performed at the Beyond the Valley music festival.

=== 2025–present: New music, tour and Sugababes ===
In January 2025, the band toured Australia again. In March 2025, Sugababes independently released the single "Jungle". In April and May 2025, Sugababes toured British and European arenas. In conjunction with the tour's commencement, "Weeds" was released. A third song, "Shook", followed in July 2025. In October 2025, the group were featured on PinkPantheress' Fancy Some More? (2025) on the song "Nice to Know You + Sugababes". That same month, they announced that their ninth studio album was expected in 2026. In November 2025, it was announced that Sugababes were in the lineup for a one-off concert, Trans Mission, in aid of trans-solidarity charities Good Law Project and Not a Phase, to be staged on 11 March 2026 by singer Olly Alexander teamed up with Mighty Hoopla. Other performers in the line-up will include Wolf Alice, Beth Ditto and Sophie Ellis-Bextor. In July 2026, the group performed at the Pori Jazz festival in Finland, Henley Festival and Depot in the Castle at Cardiff Castle, as well as performing at Silverstone CarFest in August.

In March 2026 "Weeds" was nominated for an Ivor Novello Award. On 24 September 2026, the group announced their self-titled ninth studio album, due to be released in February 2027; the album's lead single, "Ghost", was released on the same day as the LP announcement. On 7 October 2026, the group attended the 15th Attitude Awards in London, where they received the Music Award, recognising their resilience and artistic resurgence as well as their LGBTQ+ activism.

== Other endeavours ==
=== Merchandise ===
In April 2007, Mattel teamed with the Sugababes to create a new themed Barbie collection, which was released only in the United Kingdom in May 2007. The Sugababes had also told reporters that they hope to branch out into other areas such as a makeup line. In September 2010, the Sugababes released their own fragrances, named Tempt, Tease and Touch.

=== Philanthropy ===
Their cover of Aerosmith and Run-DMC's "Walk This Way", a collaboration with Girls Aloud, was the official charity single for Comic Relief in 2007, recorded at Comic Relief co-founder and trustee Richard Curtis's request. On 27 January 2010, the Sugababes performed at the "Fight Cervical Cancer Event", an event which aims to educate women about cervical cancer. In March 2010, Berrabah jumped 13,000 feet from an aircraft to raise money for a cancer charity. In September 2011, the Sugababes performed "Dancing Queen" by ABBA at the Prince of Wales Theatre for charitable purposes. In February 2023, the Sugababes performed a sold out concert in aid of War Child for Brits Week 2023. In October 2024, the Sugababes performed a medley at the Pride of Britain Awards. On 21 March 2025, the Sugababes performed "Stronger", followed by their new single "Jungle" and a medley of hits including "Overload", "Freak Like Me" and "Push the Button" for Comic Relief Red Nose Day. On 26 June 2025, Sugababes performed at the King's Trust Awards at Royal Festival Hall.

== Members ==
=== Current members ===
- Keisha Buchanan (1998–2009, 2011–present)
- Mutya Buena (1998–2005, 2011–present)
- Siobhán Donaghy (1998–2001, 2011–present)

=== Past members ===
- Heidi Range (2001–2011)
- Amelle Berrabah (2005–2011)
- Jade Ewen (2009–2011)

== Discography ==
- One Touch (2000)
- Angels with Dirty Faces (2002)
- Three (2003)
- Taller in More Ways (2005)
- Change (2007)
- Catfights and Spotlights (2008)
- Sweet 7 (2010)
- The Lost Tapes (2022)
- Sugababes (2027)

== Tours ==
=== Headlining ===
- Angels with Dirty Faces Tour (2003)
- Three Tour (2004)
- Taller in More Ways Tour (2006)
- Greatest Hits Tour (2007)
- Change Tour (2008)
- Sacred Three Tour (2013)
- Sugababes UK & Europe Tour (2022-2023)
- Sugababes Australian Tour (2023-2025)
- Sugababes '25 (2025)
- 2027 UK Tour (2027)

=== Other shows ===
- One Night Only at the O2 (2023)

=== Supporting act ===
- Blazin' Squad – UK Tour (2002)
- No Angels – Four Seasons Tour (2002)
- Take That – The Ultimate Tour (2006)
- Westlife – The Wild Dreams Tour (2022)
- Take That – Live at Hyde Park (2023)

== See also ==
- List of awards and nominations received by Sugababes
- List of best-selling girl groups
- List of songs recorded by Sugababes
