= Weeds (Sugababes song) =

2025 song by Sugababes

Single by Sugababes
- Released: 8 April 2025
- Genre: Trip hop
- Length: 3:05
- Label: Self-released
- Songwriters: Anya Jones; Jeff Young; Jon Shave; Keisha Buchanan; Mutya Buena; Sam Harper; Siobhán Donaghy; Tove Burman
- Producer: Jon Shave

Sugababes singles chronology
"Jungle" (2025)	"Weeds" (2025)	"Shook" (2025)

Music video
- "Weeds" on YouTube

"Weeds" is a song by English girl group Sugababes. Written by the group, Jon Shave, Anya Jones, Jeff Young, Sam Harper and Tove Burman, and produced by Shave, it was self-released on 8 April 2025. It will be included on the group's self-titled upcoming ninth studio album, set for release in February 2027.

Musically, "Weeds" is a trip hop song with lyrics about "growing together". The song was accompanied by a music video directed by Gemma Yin. Following its release, "Weeds" was well received by music critics, who described the song as "sultry", and praised the group for their harmonies.

== Background and release ==
In March 2025, following the release of the Sugababes' single "Jungle", the group announced during an interview with Clash magazine that further music was on the way, with Mutya Buena sharing there were "other singles that [they] were about to release". Keisha Buchanan also told NME prior to the song's release that "there's not going to be long gaps [between singles] because [the group] have a good body of work waiting." Whilst Siobhán Donaghy told the same publication, "We have another single coming that's even more of a bop, but it could remind you of another [Sugababes] era, so it couldn't come first." Released independently, distribution for the single is handled by the Orchard.

The release of "Weeds" coincided with the commencement of their '25 Tour. In a press statement, the group called the song "one of the most beautiful songs we've ever worked on", while revealing it was about "growing together". Upon release, it was described by British Vogue as a trip hop track with "syrupy" harmonies.

== Music video ==
An accompanying music video for "Weeds" was directed by Gemma Yin and was released on 30 April 2025. Of the video, Yin said, "We set out to create a beautiful mixed media performance video with an ethereal quality, to complement the gorgeous single". The video begins with the song's title on the screen in front of a glistening sea, before the group's members each perform their respective verses with different coloured backgrounds whilst lying on a white light box. Throughout the video, the group perform slow choreography in front of an array of nature-themed and idyllic back drops including blooming flowers and plants, as well as moving clouds and bodies of water. Daisy Carter of DIY described the video as an "elegant and suitably floral-inspired", whilst Dork said the video was "dreamlike".

== Reception ==
In response to the release, Dork described the song as "atmospheric". In their review, DIY contributor Daisy Carter referred to the song as "sultry", noting the group's "signature gossamer harmonies". She further compared the "more tender" song to its predecessor, which she described as a "dancefloor-filler". Clash described the song as "slow-burn", while noting songwriter Anya Jones "helped elevate" the group's vision.

The song has been nominated in the 'Best Song Musically and Lyrically' category of the Ivor Novello Awards 2026.

== Charts ==
Chart performance
Chart (2025)	Peak position
UK Singles Sales (OCC)	41

== Release history ==
Release history
Region	Date	Format	Label	Ref.
Various	8 April 2025	Digital download; streaming	Self-released	
