= Jon Shave (musician) =

Songwriter and music producer

- Born: Jonathan Christopher Shave
- Origin: Suffolk, England
- Genres: Pop; electronic; dance
- Occupations: Songwriter; record producer
- Instruments: Keyboards; programming
- Years active: 2002-present
- Publisher: Warner Chappell Music
- Formerly of: The Invisible Men; Xenomania
- Website: jonshave.com

Jonathan Christopher Shave is a songwriter and music producer.

== Career ==
Jon Shave is a twice Grammy-nominated and Brit Award-winning songwriter and music producer with over 21 billion cross-platform streams and millions of record sales worldwide. He began his career in the early 2000s as a member of Xenomania, a songwriting and production team that worked with artists such as Girls Aloud and Sugababes. In 2008, he co-founded The Invisible Men with Jason Pebworth and George Astasio, former members of Orson. The group wrote and produced multi-platinum tracks for artists including Iggy Azalea ("Fancy"), DJ Fresh ("Hot Right Now" featuring Rita Ora), Zayn Malik (Mind of Mine), Britney Spears ("Pretty Girls"), and Jessie J ("Do It Like a Dude").

In 2023, Shave began his solo career and has since co-written and produced songs for Charli XCX ("Sympathy Is a Knife", "So I", "I Think About It All the Time", "Spring Breakers"), Benjamin Ingrosso ("Kite"), Rita Ora ("Praising You"), and Loreen ("Warning Signs", "Set Me Free"). In 2026, his song "Weeds", performed by Sugababes, was announced as a nominee for Ivor Novello Award for Best Song Musically and Lyrically at the 71st Ivor Novello Awards. In July 2026, Shave received an honorary Doctor of Music degree from the University of Liverpool. He has also worked in television and film, producing two tracks for Miley Cyrus for the Black Mirror episode "Rachel, Jack and Ashley Too" and music for Belvedere's global advertising campaign featuring Daniel Craig. Shave is published by Warner Chappell Music and operates from his own studio in London.

== Discography ==
Productions, co-productions and co-writes:

Year	Artist	Song	Album
2026	Sugababes	Ghost	Sugababes
2026	Benjamin Ingrosso	Waste My Time	
2026	MNEK	WORLD DOESN'T HAVE TO BE SUCH A SCARY PLACE!!	BULLDOZER!!
2026	Danna	Sueño Mojadito	Wet Dreams
2026	Kamille	together	
2026	MNEK	OH NO!! ALL THE BOYS!!	BULLDOZER!!
2026	Xtravaganza, Kevin Jz Prodigy	Love Is Imagination	Xtravaganza - a new musical
2026	Lily Allen	Beg For Me (Jade Remix)	West End Girl
2026	Sistra	In Two, Deep Water, Deep Trouble, SISTRA	She Won't Let Go
2026	Zara Larsson, Tyla	Hot & Sexy (Girls Trip)	Girls Trip
2026	Melanie C	Drum Machine	Sweat
2026	Sistra	Daffodils	She Won't Let Go
2026	Jessie Ware	16 Summers	Superbloom
2026	Loreen	Set Me Free, No Promises	Wildfire
2026	December 10	Angel	
2026	Sistra	Is It Just Me?	She Won't Let Go
2026	Jessie Ware	I Could Get Used To This	Superbloom
2026	Sistra	Double Edged Sword	She Won't Let Go
2025	Sistra	Things I Really Mean	She Won't Let Go
2025	U-know	Stretch	I-know - The First Album
2025	Twice	Fix A Drink (Jeongyeon solo)	Ten: The Story Goes On
2025	Zara Larsson	Hot & Sexy	Midnight Sun (Zara Larsson album)
2025	Sophie Ellis-Bextor	Time	Perimenopop
2025	Joshwa	Wildflower	
2025	Sugababes	Shook	Sugababes
2025	dearALICE	Save Us	
2025	Louise Redknapp	Manifesting, Get Into It, Don't Kill My Vibe, Just Like That, Diamonds,	Confessions
2025	Sophie Ellis-Bextor	Taste	Perimenopop
2025	Ifeye	NERDY	ERLU BLUE EP
2025	Sugababes	Weeds	Sugababes
2025	Jade Thirlwall	F.U.F.N. (For The Club) remix	
2025	Louise Redknapp	Love Me More	Confessions
2025	Sugababes	Jungle	Sugababes
2025	Bree Runway	Eat In Silence - A Colors Show	
2025	Louise Redknapp	Confession	Confessions
2024	Charli XCX	Sympathy Is A Knife featuring Ariana Grande, So I featuring A. G. Cook, I Think About It All The Time featuring Bon Iver, Spring Breakers featuring Kesha	Brat and It's Completely Different but Also Still Brat
2024	Loreen	Warning Signs	
2024	Icona Pop, Badger	Body Type	
2024	Jax Jones, Jason Derulo, Joel Corry	Tonight (D.I.Y.A.)	
2024	Charli XCX	Spring Breakers	Brat and It's the Same But There's Three More Songs So It's Not
2024	Charli XCX	Sympathy Is A Knife, So I, I Think About It All The Time	Brat
2024	Bright Light Bright Light	Heartslap, Revived, Sweet Release, Enjoy Youth	Enjoy Youth
2024	Roze	Hollow, Fantasy, Saturday	Greener Grass EP
2024	Caity Baser	Oh Well, Showgirl	Still Learning (mixtape)
2024	Benjamin Ingrosso	Kite	Pink Velvet Theatre
2023	TCTS	Say No More	
2023	Joel Corry	Another Friday Night	Another Friday Night
2023	Alex Gaudino, MazZz, Dopamine	Saturday	
2023	Joel Corry, Rita Ora, MK	Drinkin'	Another Friday Night
2023	Caity Baser	Why Can't I Have Two (2, 4, 6, 8)	Still Learning (mixtape)
2023	Dopamine, Sigala	Feel It Deep Inside	
2023	Becky Hill, Lewis Thompson	Side Effects	Believe Me Now?
2023	Rita Ora	Praising You (with Fatboy Slim)	You & I
2023	FlowerovLove	Love You, Coffee Shop	
2022	FlowerovLove	Get With You, I Gotta I Gotta, Out For The Weekend, Gone	A Moshpit In The Clouds EP
2022	Kamille	Weight Loss	
2022	Flowerovlove	Hannah Montana	
2022	Sigala ft. Talia Mar	Stay The Night	
2022	Dopamine	Delete It	
2022	Charli XCX	Used To Know Me	CRASH
2021	Dopamine X Ali Story	Deep	
2021	Billy Porter	Children	Black Mona Lisa
2021	Kara Marni	Over You, Motive	State of Mine EP
2021	Mufasa & Hypeman X Dopamine	Weekend	
2021	Diane Warren, Rita Ora, Sofia Reyes, Reik	Seaside	Diane Warren: The Cave Sessions, Vol. 1
2021	Finn Askew	Adidas	
2021	Kara Marni	Second Nature	State of Mine EP
2021	Jacob Sartorious	For Real, Trapped In The Car	
2021	Hugel	Back To Life	
2021	Kara Marni	Twisted Fantasy	
2021	Riton X Nightcrawlers featuring Mufasa and Hypeman	Friday (Dopamine Re-Edit)	
2021	Kara Marni	Trippin	State of Mine EP
2020	Little Mix	Breathe	Confetti
2020	Becky Hill, Sigala	Heaven On My Mind	
2020	Example	Ain't One Thing	Some Nights Last For Days
2020	Monsta X	Misbehave	All About Luv
2020	Tommy Down	Mrs Blue	
2020	Bexey	Go Mode, Witchcraft Girls	Blood, Magic & Diamonds
2020	Cailin Russo	Declaration, Sicko	The Drama
2019	Lil Peep	I've Been Waiting (Original Version) (ft. iLoveMakonnen), walk away as the door slams (acoustic) (ft. Lil Tracy)	Everybody's Everything
2019	Miley Cyrus / Ashley O	On A Roll, Right Where I Belong	On A Roll (Single)
2019	Kara Marni	All Night pt.1, All Night pt. 2	
2019	Lil Peep, Ty Dolla $ign	When I Lie (Remix)	For the Throne: Music Inspired by the HBO Series Game of Thrones
2019	Cheryl	Let You	
2019	Bexey	Hot Steppa, Tru Colours	
2019	Rak-Su	Yours or Mine	
2019	Kara Marni	Lose My Love	
2018	Clean Bandit	Playboy Style (ft. Charli XCX & Bhad Bhabie)	What Is Love?
2018	Lil Peep	Broken Smile (My All), Cry Alone, Leanin', 16 Lines, Life Is Beautiful, Hate Me, IDGAF, White Girl	Come Over When You're Sober, Pt. 2
2018	Madison Beer ft. Offset	Hurts Like Hell	
2018	Cheryl	Love Made Me Do It	
2018	Lil Peep, XXXTentacion	Falling Down	
2018	Bexey	Take A Shot, Hell Bound, Come Alive, Spooky Electrick, Prince of the Lost and Broken, Bloody Hell	Spooky Electrick
2018	Sigala	What You Waiting For (feat. Kylie Minogue)	Brighter Days
2018	Kara Marni	Move	
2018	Sigala, Ella Eyre, Meghan Trainor	Just Got Paid ft. French Montana	Brighter Days
2018	Charli XCX	No Angel	Focus/No Angel
2018	Mako	Murder	
2018	Charli XCX	5 In The Morning	
2018	Russo	Lonely, Ghost, Loudmouth, Joyride	House With A Pool EP
2018	Kara Marni	Love Just Ain't Enough, Golden, Curve, All Or Nothing, Gullible, L Word	Love Just Ain't Enough EP
2017	Lil Peep	Save That Sh*t, Awful Things (feat. Lil Tracy), U Said, Better Off (Dying), The Brightside, Problems	Come Over When You're Sober, Pt. 1
2017	Anne-Marie	Heavy	Speak Your Mind
2017	Kara Marni	Golden	Love Just Ain't Enough EP
2017	Bebe Rexha	Gateway Drug	All Your Fault pt. 1
2016	Jonas Blue ft. Raye	By Your Side	Blue
2016	Liam Bailey	Love My Neighbour	
2016	Charles Hamilton	Oh Well, Clowns, Everyone, Correct, Be With You, Make Yourself Over, MVP, Only Christina Knows, Real Life, Ugly Supermodel	Hamilton, Charles
2016	Bebe Rexha ft. Nicki Minaj	No Broken Hearts	
2016	Zayn	Mind of Mine (Intro), Wrong (ft. Kehlani), Fool For You, Truth, Lucozade, Like I Would, She Don't Love Me, Golden	Mind of Mine
2016	All Saints	Fear	Red Flag
2016	Sigala ft. Imani and DJ Fresh	Say You Do	Brighter Days
2016	Travis Mills	Hangover	While You Wait EP
2015	Britney Spears & Iggy Azalea	Pretty Girls	
2015	Charles Hamilton	Face The Music, Crayola, Lessons (ft. Sam Bruno)	Black Box EP
2015	Charles Hamilton	New York Raining (ft. Rita Ora)	
2015	Liam Bailey	Stun Me, Battle Hymn of Central London	Definitely Now
2015	Iggy Azalea	Work, Fancy (ft. Charli XCX), Impossible Is Nothing, Goddess, Walk The Line, New Chick, Don't Need Y'all, Lady Patra, F Love, Rolex, Just Asking, We In This B, Beg for It (featuring MØ), Trouble (featuring Jennifer Hudson), Iggy Szn, Heavy Crown (featuring Ellie Goulding)	The New Classic / Reclassified
2014	Iggy Azalea	Work, Fancy (ft. Charli XCX), Impossible Is Nothing, Goddess, Walk The Line, New Chick, Don't Need Y'all, Lady Patra, F Love, Rolex, Just Asking, We In This B, Beg for It (featuring MØ), Trouble (featuring Jennifer Hudson), Iggy Szn, Heavy Crown (featuring Ellie Goulding)	The New Classic / Reclassified
2014	Cheryl Cole	It's About Time	Only Human
2014	Lower Than Atlantis	Emily, Words Don't Come So Easily, Just What You Need	Lower Than Atlantis
2014	Bright Light Bright Light	I Believe, In Your Care, Too Much, Happiness	Life is Easy
2014	Dominique Young Unique	Throw It Down	
2014	Katy B	Next Thing	Little Red (album)
2014	Dan Croll	Wanna Know	Sweet Disarray
2014	DJ Fresh vs. Jay Fay	Dibby Dibby Sound (feat. Ms. Dynamite)	
2013	Iggy Azalea	Work	
2013	Ellie Goulding	Flashlight	Halcyon Days
2013	Conor Maynard	Animal (feat. Wiley)	Contrast
2012	DJ Fresh	Hot Right Now ft. Rita Ora, The Power ft. Dizzee Rascal, The Feeling ft. RaVaughn, Skyhighatrist ft. Rizzle Kicks, Forever More ft. The Fray & Professor Green, Don't Tell Me ft. Liam Bailey, Fire Over Water ft. Juliette Lewis	Nextlevelism
2012	Conor Maynard	Can't Say No, Vegas Girl, Animal, Take Off, Mary Go Round, Headphones, Better Than You	Contrast
2012	Coldplay	Princess of China (feat. Rihanna) (Invisible Men Remix)	Mylo Xyloto
2012	Bright Light Bright Light	Feel It, Waiting for the Feeling, Moves	Make Me Believe in Hope
2012	Girls Aloud	On the Metro	Ten
2012	Jessie J	LaserLight (feat. David Guetta)	Who You Are (Jessie J album)
2011	David Guetta	Repeat feat. Jessie J	Nothing but the Beat
2011	Jessie J	Do It like a Dude, Who's Laughing Now, LaserLight, My Shadow	Who You Are
2011	Pixie Lott	Birthday	Young Foolish Happy
2011	Nicola Roberts	Say It Out Loud, Take a Bite	Cinderella's Eyes
2010	Gabriella Cilmi	On a Mission, What If You Knew, Love Me Cos You Want To, Defender, Robots, Invisible Girl, Let Me Know, Sucker For Love	Ten
2010	I Blame Coco	Quicker	The Constant
2010	Olly Murs	Love Shine Down, This One's For The Girls, Sophie	Olly Murs
2009	V V Brown	Game Over	Travelling Like the Light
2008	Sugababes	No Can Do, Nothing's As Good As You, Hanging On A Star	Catfights and Spotlights
2008	Gabriella Cilmi	Round & Round	Lessons to Be Learned: Deluxe Edition
2007	Girls Aloud	Control Of The Knife	Tangled Up (Girls Aloud album)
2006	Frank	Devil's Got Your Gold album	
2006	Alesha Dixon	Knockdown	Fired Up
2006	Girls Aloud	Crazy Fool	Whole Lotta History EP
2005	Sugababes	Red Dress	Taller in More Ways
2005	Texas	Get Down Tonight, Bad Weather	Red Book
2005	Girls Aloud	Chemistry (album)	
2004	Girls Aloud	The Show	What Will The Neighbours Say?
2003	Sugababes	Situation's Heavy	Three
2003	Abs	7 Ways	
2003	Girls Aloud	Jump	Love Actually (soundtrack)
2003	Girls Aloud	No Good Advice	Sound of the Underground (album)
2003	Jason Downs	Dirty Mind, Heaven & Hell	The Spin
2003	TK	Everything But You	Black Butterfly
