= Flatline (Mutya Keisha Siobhan song) =

2013 single by Mutya Keisha Siobhan

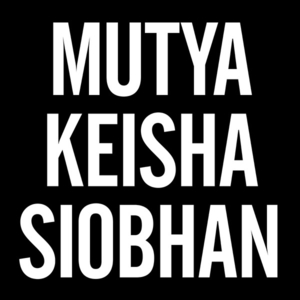

Single by Mutya Keisha Siobhan / Sugababes (Note: When the song was added back to streaming platforms in 2022, it was credited to the Sugababes instead of Mutya Keisha Siobhan.)
- Released: 6 September 2013
- Recorded: January 2013
- Studio: Los Angeles, California
- Genre: Pop rock; R&B
- Length: 3:51
- Label: Polydor
- Songwriters: Mutya Buena; Keisha Buchanan; Siobhán Donaghy; Dev Hynes
- Producer: Dev Hynes

Mutya Keisha Siobhan / Sugababes singles chronology
"Wear My Kiss" (2010)	"Flatline" (2013)	"When the Rain Comes" (2023)

Music video
- "Flatline" on YouTube

Alternative cover
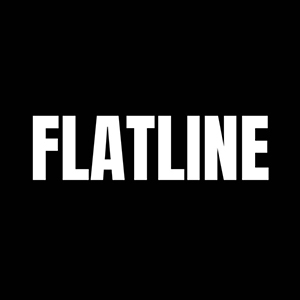
- "Flatline" 2022 re-release cover (Note: upon re-release to streaming platforms in 2022, a new cover art was used)

"Flatline" is a song by English girl group Mutya Keisha Siobhan, the original line up of the Sugababes. It was written by the trio alongside British artist Dev Hynes, who also produced it. The song was released via digital retailers on 6 September 2013 by Polydor Records, who signed the band in 2012. It is an R&B-tinged pop rock song in which the drums and the male backing vocals get gradually stronger until the climax. Lyrically, it addresses the deterioration of a relationship.

Upon its release, "Flatline" received acclaim from music journalists, who favoured its production and vocal harmonies. Commercially, the song charted at number 50 on the UK Singles Chart and reached number 14 in Ireland. A music video for the song was directed by Auleta and filmed at Venice Beach. They performed "Flatline" at their Sacred Three Tour and at other headlining sets including Scala and G-A-Y.

On 9 June 2022, the single and music video were re-released under the Sugababes name, after the group regained the name in 2019. It was later included on their album The Lost Tapes (2022), an album created from unreleased songs originally recorded during their 2011–2014 studio sessions.

== Conception and release ==
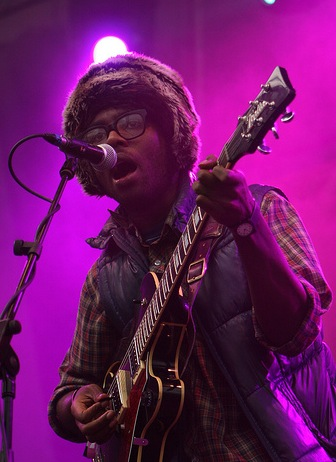
British artist Dev Hynes (pictured) produced and co-wrote "Flatline".

In April 2012, it was reported that the original line-up of the Sugababes had signed a £1 million record deal with Polydor Records. In July 2012, it was officially confirmed that the group had reformed under the name Mutya Keisha Siobhan and were writing songs for a new album under Polydor. The name was officially registered through the European Union on 27 June 2012.

"Flatline" was written by Keisha Buchanan, Mutya Buena and Siobhán Donaghy, alongside British musician Dev Hynes. It was entirely developed and recorded in Los Angeles in January 2013, after composing most of the material for their debut as Mutya Keisha Siobhan. The group specifically went to the city to record a "killer" lead single for their album. Travelling to Los Angeles resulted in the trio composing the song entirely in their first day in the city. Hynes started randomly playing the keyboard and bass, and invited the trio to "vibe with him". The group pursued a Coldplay-influenced sound for the song's chorus, however after realizing that their voices were not "manly enough", Hynes contacted band Spector member Fred Macpherson to sing backing vocals for the track.

On 4 June 2013, Mutya Keisha Siobhan announced the title of the song. They later uploaded a one-minute, eleven-second preview of the track to their official SoundCloud page on 13 June. The track was originally scheduled for release in the UK and Ireland on 1 September 2013, but was then delayed until 15 September for unknown reasons. The release date was then changed a second time, being brought forward to 6 September. The release of the actual song was preceded by Polydor sending an EP to digital retailers, including 4 remixes of the song. In 2022, Buchanan said the group had "finally got justice" for 'Flatine', having been able to get it back on Spotify. NME magazine noted that the song was now attributed to the Sugababes as opposed to Mutya Keisha Siobhan when it was first released.

== Composition ==
Flatline (2013)
A 19-second audio sample of "Flatline", a pop rock and R&B song that conveys the destruction of a relationship.

Having a length of three minutes and fifty-one seconds (3:51), "Flatline" is a pop rock song with R&B influences in the vocals, and was produced by Dev Hynes. It is composed in the key of G major, and contains a metronome of 128 beats per minute. Musically, it carries out a chord progression of D–Em–Bm–C, while the group members' vocal ranges go from the notes of G_{3} to E_{5}. Lyrically, the song addresses the deterioration of a relationship, which is more visible on the song's chorus, where the trio sings "I can feel a flatline, that ought to be a wave".

It commences with a "noodly" guitar riff, set against a 90s-inspired piano-driven R&B melodies and "bubbling" 80s pop beats, which is reminiscent of the production found in American recording artist Solange Knowles' extended play True—which, much like "Flatline", was produced entirely by Hynes. Siobhán Donaghy sings the first verse of the track, being followed by Keisha Buchanan, who gives her vocals during the pre-chorus, in which she references the playing cards King and Queen. After the chorus, the second verse is sung by Mutya Buena, and the song eventually enters a crescendo, as the backing vocals get louder and the drums stronger. This section of the song was described by Michael Cragg of The Guardian as being "Florence-esque", in which the group sings the chorus repeatedly along with several ad-libs. A writer from Fact wrote that the song "build[s] from Robyn-style melodrama into fist-pumping stadium fare".

== Critical reception ==
Since its release, the song has received widespread critical acclaim. Eve Barlow from NME claimed that it was "worth the 12-year wait" and dismissed the current Sugababes line-up. Robert Copsey of Digital Spy was extremely positive about the song, awarding it five stars out of five, and commented: "[It] isn't the sort of smack around the face you'd normally expect but rather one that draws you in slowly but surely before swallowing you whole." Writing for The Guardian, Michael Cragg said there was "something indescribably captivating" about the song, and likened it to the group's debut single "Overload"—as the Sugababes. Laura Snapes from Pitchfork Media was enthusiastic about Hynes' production, classifying it as "immaculate", and highlighted the group's vocal harmonies.

Billboard's Jason Lipshutz called it an "immediately affecting" 2013 song and favoured the use of the word "miscellaneous" on its lyrics. Robbie Daw from the music website Idolator was in sync with the aforementioned comments, calling it a "synthy, handclappy, glorious pop gem that comes just in time for the summer". Carl Smith of Sugarscape.com deemed "Flatline" "a bit amazing" and believed that the artists' harmonies could rival the group Little Mix, while noting that the song did not follow any current musical trend. Bradley Stern from MuuMuse opined that the song had "revitalized the very essence" of the Sugababes, named it one of the best of 2013 and commented that it sounded like a newly recorded version of One Touch. Much like previous critics, Michelle Kambasha of DIY highlighted the singers' harmonies and noted that Hynes had "inject[ed] his solid-gold formula" to the song's production.

Drowned in Sound's writing staff picked "Flatline" included it in their list of 2013's best songs on number sixteenth, as did Edge on the Net, that put it on seventh place.

== Chart performance ==
"We've been dying to get the music out there and it's been a long time coming. It's great to start the campaign and get going with the tour. The tour is what it's all about really as our live performance is such an important part of what we are. In that respect, the single has done the job it was meant to do."

— Siobhán Donaghy, on the purpose of "Flatline".

Only entering two European charts, "Flatline" reached number 14 on the Irish Singles Chart, however it peaked at number 50 on the UK Singles Chart. The group denied allegations of it being a "flop": "I don't think our song got lost on the radio. I think there were certain things that happened behind the scenes that couldn't be helped. Our goal was to put a song out that people liked and we think we've done that". They also expressed preference in going on tour and releasing an album than having a "throw-away hit" on the charts." To NME, Buchanan reiterated those sentiments and denied rumours floating at the time that speculated that the group had been dropped by Polydor.

In 2016, Alim Keraj wrote about surprising stories behind Sugababes songs for Digital Spy. Kheraj noted that the performance of "Flatline" was negatively impacted by being released on a Friday, the industry standard in the UK was to release on Sundays which meant that the song only got a limited amount of tracking for the charts. Furthermore, the single got little recognition from radio stations, something Kheraj thought might have been due to the production by Dev Hynes and which Kheraj felt would not have happened in 2016 due to Hynes' improved reputation as an "indie darling".

== Promotion ==
The official lyric video for "Flatline" was released online on 19 July 2013. It was created by a fan named Jonas, who sent the visual to the group's Twitter account. One week after, the singers announced that they would make it their official lyric video, and thanked him for the submission. The clip sees the group adopting "mod-style" graphics, as the lyrics are spelled out in the screen in a colourful, 3D way. During their headline set at Scala, a nightclub in London, held on 1 August 2013, Mutya Keisha Siobhan played various Sugababes-era hits alongside new album songs, and closed the performance with a medley that mixed "Flatline" with select verses of "Push the Button". On 19 August, it was announced that their first televised performance of "Flatline" would be on Alan Carr: Chatty Man. They eventually performed the single on 6 September episode of the show. Eleven days after, the trio performed the track during their set at gay nightclub G-A-Y. The trio also performed it during their tour, entitled The Sacred Three Tour.

== Music video ==
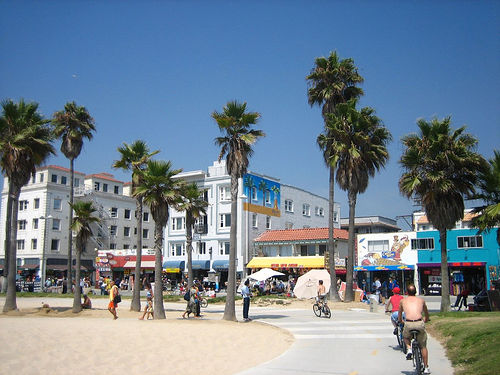
The music video was shot at Venice Beach (pictured), in Los Angeles.

The official music video for "Flatline" was shot by fashion photographer KT Auleta at the Venice Beach in Venice, Los Angeles in July 2013. The trio revealed that they had seen her work on the Italian edition of Vogue and thought it was "amazing", therefore, they picked her to film the visual. The group described the video treatment which Auleta wrote as having "summed up how [they] felt about the song", and further revealed that they opted to film the video in Los Angeles as it was the city in which they wrote "Flatline" with Hynes. The singers teased the music video with pictures of them at the set. The video was ultimately released on 19 August 2013.

The visual begins with a shot of the three singers walking down a street in Venice Beach, followed by them getting ice cream and being on top of a motorcycle. As the singers lip-sync their verses, the camera zooms in each singer. These are interspersed with clips of the trio standing in front of a wall with several graffitis. Later on, they are seen sitting on chairs on a beach, with "coquettish" sunglasses; walking near the sea. As the song builds to its last compass, they run to an orange convertible, in which they drive to a desert. They reach the desert and are joined by a marching band, who play the drums heard in the song. The group exits the car and start dancing to the sound of the drums. The very last scene of the music video sees Siobhan driving them away as they have their hands in the air, and the screen fades to black.

For Popjustice, Michael Cragg said that the video did not "help the song", and negatively regarded that it resembled a behind-the-scenes video of a photoshoot.

== Track listing ==
Digital download

1. "Flatline" – 3:53

'Flatline (Ron Flieger Remix)

1. "Flatline" (Ron Flieger Remix Remix) – 3:25

Flatline (Remixes) — EP

1. "Flatline" (MNEK Remix) – 5:48
2. "Flatline" (MJ Cole Remix) – 6:39
3. "Flatline" (Seamus Haji Remix) – 5:37
4. "Flatline" (Jamie Reynolds–Klaxons Remix) – 5:53

== Charts ==
Chart history for "Flatline" in 2013
Chart (2013)	Peak position
Brazil (Top 100 Brasil)	40
Lebanon (The Official Lebanese Top 20)	19
Ireland (IRMA)	14
Scottish Singles Sales (Official Charts)	77
UK Singles (Official Charts)	50

== Release history ==
Release history and formats for "Flatline"
Country	Date	Format	Version	Label	Ref
Various	6 September 2013	Digital download; Streaming	Mutya Keisha Siobhan original release	Polydor Records; Universal Music (Note: Released by Polydor Records in the UK and Ireland, and affiliated Universal Music Group operations worldwide.)	
Various	3 June 2022	Digital download; Streaming	Sugababes re-release	Independent	
