= When the Rain Comes =

Single by Sugababes
- Released: 15 September 2023
- Recorded: 2023
- Genre: Pop; R&B
- Length: 3:19
- Label: BMG
- Songwriter(s): Keisha Buchanan; George Moore; Siobhán Donaghy; Mutya Buena; Iain James
- Producer(s): George Moore

Sugababes singles chronology
"Flatline" (2013)	"When the Rain Comes" (2023)	"Situation" (2024)

Visualiser video
- "When the Rain Comes" on YouTube

"When the Rain Comes" is a song by English girl group Sugababes. The song was written by the trio, alongside Iain James and George Moore, the latter of whom also produced the track. Released on 15 September 2023, "When the Rain Comes" marks the group's first new release since their long-withheld reunion album, The Lost Tapes (2022); the single marked the first and only release under record label BMG.

== Background and release ==
We loved being back in the studio and writing this song this summer, and it feels like the perfect song to release to coincide with our biggest headline show to date. This song is a celebration of the people in our lives who stand by us and lift us up through the good and bad times. The three of us have been that for each other over the years, and we felt there was no better way to mark this moment in our journey than with this song.

— Sugababes, on the release of "When the Rain Comes"

In December 2022, the Sugababes announced the surprise release of their eighth studio album The Lost Tapes on social media, that consisted of previously unreleased leaked material. The album debuted at number 2 on the UK Album Downloads Chart Top 100. In February 2023, the group announced that they "definitely had plans for new material" after the "incredible" reaction to the album. Following the conclusion of their headline tour, the Sugababes announced a "one night only" concert at the O2 Arena on 15 September 2023. The group later began posting teasers of themselves in a recording studio on social media. On 14 September 2023, the day prior to the concert, the group announced on Instagram that their new single would be released at midnight, and they performed the song for the first time during the show that evening as part of the setlist. The single was originally set to be made available on CD and vinyl on 3 November 2023. The release was pushed back to 26 January 2024.

== Promotion ==
In October 2023, the group performed the song on an episode of The Graham Norton Show. The band also performed the song on Jools' Annual Hootenanny on 31 December 2023.

== Reception ==
Writing for Clash magazine, Robin Murray described "When the Rain Comes" as a "new classic" that "[radiated] pop brilliance". After the group performed the song for the first time as part of their "one night only" concert, Retro Pop Magazine noted that the song was a "soulful mid tempo [track]" that was "worlds away from the hyper electro-pop that ultimately characterised the final chapter of the group back in 2011", added that the song [leaned] into the soundscape of their classic debut album One Touch (2000) and [conjured] a full-circle narrative reflecting on their path so far.

== Charts ==
Weekly chart performance for "When the Rain Comes"
Chart (2023)	Peak position
UK Singles Sales (OCC)	14

== Release history ==
"When the Rain Comes" release history
Region	Date	Format	Label	Ref(s).
Various	15 September 2023	Digital download; streaming	BMG	
Various	26 January 2024	CD; vinyl	BMG	
