= Angels with Dirty Faces (disambiguation) =

Angels with Dirty Faces is a 1938 gangster film with James Cagney.

Angels with Dirty Faces may also refer to:

- "Angels with Dirty Faces" (Sham 69 song), 1979
- Angels with Dirty Faces (Tricky album), 1998
- Angels with Dirty Faces (Sugababes album), 2002
- "Angels with Dirty Faces" (Sugababes song), 2002
- "Angels with Dirty Faces", a 1982 song by Frankie Miller, later covered by Clare Grogan
- "Angels with Dirty Faces", a 1992 song by Los Lobos from Kiko
- "Angels with Dirty Faces", a 2004 song by Sum 41 from Chuck
- The Angels with Dirty Faces, nickname for Omar Sívori, Antonio Angelillo and Humberto Maschio, three footballers who transferred from Argentina to Italy in 1958
- Angels with Dirty Faces, a 2016 book by Walidah Imarisha
- "Angels with Dirty Faces" (Merseybeat), a 2003 television episode
