= No Man No Cry =

No Man No Cry may refer to:

- "No Man No Cry" (Sugababes song), 2002
- "No Man No Cry" (Kelly Rowland song), 2008
