= Shape (song) =

2003 single by Sugababes

Single by Sugababes

from the album Angels with Dirty Faces
- B-side: "Killer"
- Released: 10 March 2003
- Genre: Pop; R&B
- Length: 4:12
- Label: Island
- Songwriters: Sting; Dominic Miller; Craig Dodds
- Producer: Craigie

Sugababes singles chronology
"Stronger" / "Angels with Dirty Faces" (2002)	"Shape" (2003)	"Hole in the Head" (2003)

Music video
- "Shape" on YouTube

"Shape" is a song by English girl group Sugababes, released as the fourth and final single from their second studio album, Angels with Dirty Faces (2002). It was composed by Sting, Dominic Miller, and Craig Dodds, who produced the song. The midtempo pop and R&B ballad incorporates a sample of Sting's 1993 recording "Shape of My Heart", whose vocals are featured in the chorus. It received mixed reviews from critics, who were ambivalent towards the sample of "Shape of My Heart".

The single attained moderate success and reached the top twenty on the charts in Ireland, the Netherlands, Norway and the United Kingdom. The song's music video was directed by Michael Gracey and Pete Commins, and filmed in Sydney, Australia. The video was censored and later re-shot due to its depiction of nudity. It features the Sugababes at a masquerade ball in a mansion. The Sugababes performed "Shape" on GMTV, at the V Festival, and on tour in support of their albums. It was the last single from Sugababes to be released on Compact Cassette.

== Background and composition ==
"Shape"
A music sample of "Shape", which is a rendition of Sting's 1993 recording "Shape of My Heart".

"Shape" was written by Sting, Dominic Miller and Craigie Dodds, and produced by Dodds under his production name Craigie, for the Sugababes' second studio album, Angels with Dirty Faces (2002). It is a remake of Sting's 1993 recording "Shape of My Heart"; the song's verses were changed, while the chorus that features Sting's vocals was re-recorded. According to Sugababes member Mutya Buena, "He felt he could do better with the chorus, so he came in to re-record it". The song was engineered by Jack Guy, and programmed by Craigie Dodds and Additional programming by Dean Barratt. Additional vocal recording was completed by Ben Georgiades. "Shape" is the album's fourth and final single, and was released in the United Kingdom on 10 March 2003 as a CD single and cassette tape. The B-side is a cover version of English producer Adamski's 1990 single "Killer".

"Shape" is a midtempo pop and R&B ballad with a subtle dance groove. The song was composed in the key of F minor, at a moderately slow tempo of 82 beats per minute. The Sugababes' vocal range in the song spans from the lower note of F_{3} to the highest note of G_{4}. Its instrumentation consists of keyboards and bass guitar. The chorus of the song features Sting's vocals.

== Reception ==
=== Critical response ===
"Shape" received generally mixed reviews from critics. Alexis Petridis of The Guardian criticised the track as a "lumbering, mirthless AOR ballad, grown-up in the worst sense of the phrase". The Birmingham Post's Andrew Cowen panned the song as "horrible", and regarded the sample from "Shape of My Heart" as "not big or clever". Andy Kellman of AllMusic called "Shape" a "bum moment" on the album, and dismissed it as a "misguided re-configuration" of the sample. Alex Needham of NME considered it a "massive faux pas" on the album. The Jerusalem Post writer Harry Rubenstein viewed "Shape" as "[a] sing- along, more than a cover, that sounds completely uninspired and out of place amongst the faster-paced R&B tracks on the rest of the album". In contrast, David Byrne of RTÉ.ie called the track a "nice touch" on the album, while Daily Record writer Julie MacCaskill complimented the sample of Sting's "Shape of My Heart", which she felt produced the song's powerful hook. Alan Poole from the Coventry Evening Telegraph wrote that the Sugababes "underline their versatility" on the track. A writer from South Wales Echo felt that "Shape" was equally good as "Freak like Me" and "Round Round", the group's number-one singles from the same album. A critic from Daily Mirror described it as a "clever" cover that depicts the Sugababes "on top form".

=== Commercial performance ===
"Shape" debuted at number eleven on the UK Singles Chart on 22 March 2003. It became the first single from Angels with Dirty Faces to not reach the top ten. By early 2010, it had sold 55,000 copies in the UK. The song was more successful on the Irish Singles Chart, where it debuted and peaked at number nine, and in turn became the third single from Angels with Dirty Faces to reach the top ten. "Shape" also achieved commercial success in Continental Europe. In Belgium, the song reached number two on the Ultratip chart in Wallonia, and number 49 on the Ultratop chart in Flanders. The single debuted at number 16 on the Netherlands' Dutch Top 40 chart, and peaked at number seven three weeks later. It ended as the chart's 76th best-performing single of 2003. The song peaked at number 16 on the Norwegian VG-lista chart and spent four weeks in the top twenty. "Shape" attained top-forty positions on the German and Swiss singles charts, and reached the top fifty on the Austrian chart. The single debuted and peaked at number 75 on the Australian Singles Chart, where it charted for a total of four weeks.

== Promotion ==
=== Music video ===
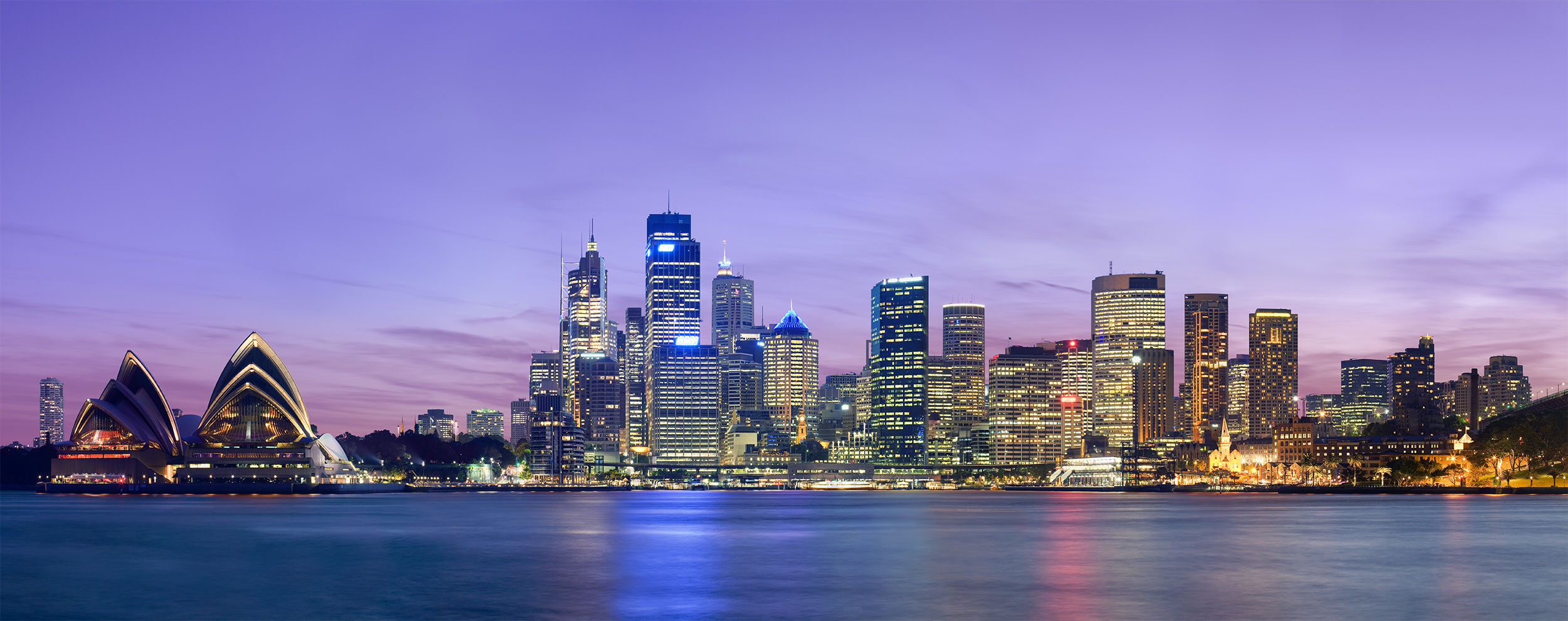
The music video for "Shape" was filmed in Sydney, Australia.

The accompanying music video for "Shape" was directed by Michael Gracey and Pete Commins. It was filmed during December 2002 in Sydney, Australia, and was released on 24 February 2003. Baz Luhrmann's Moulin Rouge! team assisted in its production. Sting did not appear in the video due to a busy schedule. The video was subsequently re-shot after being deemed "too raunchy". The video features computer-generated butterflies around the group members' bodies and was described as displaying "a wonderland".

The video opens with a scene of the ocean at night. It then shows a mansion by the water, in which Buena is seen standing by a balcony. The following scene shows Range entering the mansion as two men open the doors for her. Buena is shown walking in the middle of a masquerade ball, in which she captures the attention of a man. The Sugababes are shown on a couch, where Buchanan holds a man's hand; they all then walk down the mansion's staircase. Each group member begins to dance with a man at the ball. Buena walks towards a mirror which depicts a reflection of the Sugababes, while Buchanan drops her white mask which subsequently shatters. Towards the end of the video, they are shown leaving the ball before Buchanan jumps off the balcony and into the water. All three members are shown collectively in the water, which begins to fade out into the sky. The last scene shows the men that were in the mansion walking away.

=== Live performances ===
The Sugababes performed "Shape" on GMTV on 20 February 2003 which was the same day of the 2003 BRIT Awards. They performed the song on 30 March 2003 at the Royal Court Theatre in Liverpool. An acoustic version of the song was performed during their tour in support of Three (2003), the group's third studio album. The group sang "Shape" at the Edinburgh Corn Exchange on 18 August 2004 as part of a set list. The third line-up of the Sugababes, comprising Buchanan, Range and Amelle Berrabah, played the single while on the Taller in More Ways tour as part of a medley with "Stronger". The trio also performed these two songs as an acoustic medley at the 2006 V Festival, and at the 100 Club in London to promote the release of their greatest hits album, Overloaded: The Singles Collection.

== Track listings ==
CD1 single
No.	Title	Writer(s)	Producer(s)	Length
1.	"Shape" (radio mix)	Sting; Dominic Miller; Craig Dodds	Craigie	4:11
2.	"Killer"	Adam Tinley; Seal Henry Samuel	Brian Higgins	4:02
3.	"Freak like Me" (Brits 2003 version)	Eugene Hanes; Marc Valentine; Loren Hill; William Collins; George Clinton; Gary Numan	Richard X; Jeremy Wheatley^{[a]}	3:26
4.	"Shape" (video)			4:11

CD2 single
No.	Title	Writer(s)	Producer(s)	Length
1.	"Shape" (album version)	Sting; Miller; Dodds	Craigie	4:11
2.	"Shape" (Salaam Remi remix)	Sting; Miller; Dodds	Craigie; Salaam Remi^{[a]}	4:10
3.	"Shape" (Double R remix featuring Romeo)	Sting; Miller; Dodds; Marvin Dawkins	Craigie; Double R^{[a]}; Jeff Ishmal^{[b]}	4:50
4.	"Shape" (D-Bop's vocal breakdown mix)	Sting; Miller; Dodds	Craigie; D-Bop^{[a]}; Andy Allder^{[a]}; Dave Cross^{[a]}	7:44

Cassette single
No.	Title	Writer(s)	Producer(s)	Length
1.	"Shape" (radio mix)	Sting; Miller; Dodds	Craigie	4:11
2.	"Killer"	Tinley; Samuel	Higgins	4:02
3.	"Shape" (live version)	Sting; Miller; Dodds	Craigie	4:15

Notes

- ^{^a} denotes additional producer(s)
- ^{^b} denotes additional vocal producer(s)

== Credits and personnel ==
Credits are adapted from the liner notes of Overloaded: The Singles Collection.

- Songwriting – Sting, Dominic Miller, Craig Dodds
- Production – Craigie Dodds
- Engineering – Jack Guy
- Programming – Craigie Dodds
- Additional vocal recording – Ben Georgiades
- Additional programming – Dean Barratt
- Keyboards – Jonathan Quarmby
- Vocals – Keisha Buchanan, Mutya Buena, Heidi Range
- Bass guitar – Kevin Bacon

== Charts ==
=== Weekly charts ===
Weekly chart performance for "Shape"
Chart (2003)	Peak position
Australia (ARIA)	75
Austria (Ö3 Austria Top 40)	50
Belgium (Ultratop 50 Flanders)	49
Belgium (Ultratip Bubbling Under Wallonia)	2
Croatia (HRT)	3
Europe (Eurochart Hot 100)	40
Germany (GfK)	39
Hungary (Editors' Choice Top 40)	17
Ireland (IRMA)	9
Italy (FIMI)	30
Netherlands (Dutch Top 40)	7
Netherlands (Single Top 100)	10
Norway (VG-lista)	16
Romania (Romanian Top 100)	27
Scottish Singles Sales (Official Charts)	12
Switzerland (Schweizer Hitparade)	40
UK Singles (Official Charts)	11
UK Airplay (Music Week)	15

=== Year-end charts ===
Year-end chart performance for "Shape"
Chart (2003)	Position
Netherlands (Dutch Top 40)	76
Netherlands (Single Top 100)	97
UK Singles (OCC)	175

== Release history ==
Release dates and formats for "Shape"
Region	Date	Format(s)	Label(s)	Ref.
United Kingdom	10 March 2003	CD; cassette	Island	
Australia	12 May 2003	CD	Island	
