= Stronger (Sugababes song) =

2002 single by Sugababes

Single by Sugababes

from the album Angels with Dirty Faces
- A-side: "Angels with Dirty Faces"
- B-side: "Groove Is Going On"
- Released: 11 November 2002
- Genre: Downtempo; pop; R&B
- Length: 4:02
- Label: Island
- Songwriters: Mutya Buena; Keisha Buchanan; Heidi Range; Jony Rockstar; Marius de Vries; Felix Howard
- Producer: Jony Rockstar

Sugababes singles chronology
| "Round Round" (2002) | "Stronger" / "Angels with Dirty Faces" (2002) | "Shape" (2003) |

Music video
- "Stronger" on YouTube

"Stronger" is a song by the British girl group Sugababes from their second studio album, Angels with Dirty Faces (2002). The Sugababes wrote the song in collaboration with Jony Rockstar, Marius de Vries and Felix Howard; it was inspired by group member Heidi Range's experience of being separated from her family and friends. "Stronger" is a downtempo pop and R&B ballad with a self-empowerment theme. It is the third single from Angels with Dirty Faces and was released as a double A-side with the album's title track. The song received generally positive reviews from critics, who praised the lyrics and the group's vocals, although some were ambivalent towards its composition.

"Stronger" reached number seven on the UK Singles Chart and entered the top 10 on the singles charts in the Netherlands and Norway. It peaked within the top 40 in Australia, New Zealand and several European countries. Alison Murray directed the song's music video, which was filmed at a swimming pool in London and portrays each group member as a different persona. The single was performed by the Sugababes at the Edinburgh 50,000 – The Final Push concert in July 2005, and was included in the set lists for their tours in support of Three, Overloaded: The Singles Collection and Change. Lee Mead covered the ballad for his Lee Mead studio album.

== Background and release ==
Soon after the release of the group's first album, One Touch (2000), and its singles "New Year", "Run for Cover" and "Soul Sound", the Sugababes were dropped by their record label London Records, and Siobhán Donaghy left the group amid reports of in-fighting with Keisha Buchanan and Mutya Buena. The former Atomic Kitten member Heidi Range was announced as Donaghy's replacement, and the Sugababes subsequently signed to Island Records. "Stronger" was written by Buchanan, Buena and Range, in collaboration with Jony Rockstar, Marius de Vries and Felix Howard, for the group's second studio album Angels with Dirty Faces. The song was conceptualised during the period in Range's life when she had not yet joined the group and was separated from her family and friends. Range related her experience to the writing process of "Stronger", a technique which she suggested was essential for songwriting. The song was produced and mixed by Rockstar. Tom Elmhirst also mixed the song, recorded the group's vocals and programmed it. Range has named "Stronger" as her favourite song from the group's career, and considers it personal to her. "Stronger" was released as the album's third single as part of a double A-side with the album's title track in CD, cassette and 12-inch single formats on 11 November 2002. To promote its release, the Sugababes played the track to the Birmingham Mail in October 2002 as part of an interview, and visited 95.8 Capital FM in November 2002.

== Composition and lyrics ==
"Stronger"
A sound sample of the slow-paced pop and R&B ballad "Stronger", showing the orchestral music arrangement and dark melody.

"Stronger" is a downtempo pop and R&B ballad, with elements of hip hop. "Stronger" was composed in the key of A minor in common time, at a relatively slow-paced 74 beats per minute. The song features an orchestral musical arrangement; its instrumentation is provided by a bass guitar, violin, viola, cello, double bass, drums and keyboards. The song features a slow and dark melody, and is reminiscent of the Sugababes' 2001 One Touch single "Run for Cover". According to NME's Alex Needham, "Stronger" has a similar musical style to the American R&B group En Vogue. Graeme Virtue of The Sunday Herald compared the ballad to the music of English group Massive Attack, writing: "The orchestral sweep of 'Stronger' aims for Massive Attack-style emotional sweep". "Stronger" is a self-empowerment ballad that contains an "I-will-survive" testimony; the chorus is opened with the line, "I'm all alone, and finally, I'm getting stronger".

== Reception ==
=== Critical response ===
Critical response to "Stronger" was generally positive. Andy Strickland of Yahoo! Music described it as having "splashes of pure Massive Attack". Stuart McCaighy of This Is Fake DIY wrote that it "sounds ace", while Birmingham Post writer Andrew Cowen described the track as "defiant". Dean Piper from Daily Mirror considered it the Sugababes' best release and applauded the group's vocals on the song. Hot Press writer Phil Udell characterised "Stronger" as "an elegant ballad way beyond their tender years". Akin Ojumu of The Guardian was complimentary about the track's R&B elements, writing: "When they get it right on tracks such as 'Stronger' and 'Supernatural' the Sugababes are cool". Fiona Shepherd of The Scotsman praised the song's composition, calling it "tastefully restrained". However, Barry Nicholson from NME named it the weaker track on the double A-side and stated that it "leers at you for a bit, then staggers off to puke up that last Bacardi Breezer". Marianne Gunn from The Herald called the track's strings "inferior" and wrote that it contains "the same cheesy sentiment" as American singer Britney Spears' song of the same name.

=== Commercial performance ===
"Stronger" debuted at number seven on the UK Singles Chart in the issue dated 23 November 2002 as part of its double A-side release with the album's title track. It became the third consecutive single from Angels with Dirty Faces to reach the top 10 in the UK. The single eventually spent thirteen weeks on the chart. The double A-side has sold 125,000 copies in the United Kingdom, placing it twelfth on the Sugababes' list of highest-selling singles. The double A-side debuted and peaked at number 34 on the Australian Singles Chart on 9 March 2003 and spent nine weeks on the chart. It performed better on the New Zealand Singles Chart, where it peaked at number 24 and remained on the chart for eighteen weeks. "Stronger" charted individually in other countries. The song performed most notably on the Dutch Top 40 chart, where it peaked at number five, spent six weeks in the top 10, and was placed 29th on its list of best-performing singles in 2003. "Stronger" reached number six on the Norwegian VG-lista chart and spent fourteen weeks in the top 20. The single peaked at number 11 on the Danish Singles Chart, and number 13 on the Irish Singles Chart. "Stronger" debuted at number 43 on the Ultratop chart in Belgium (Flanders) and later peaked at number 20. It peaked at number 23 on the Swedish and Swiss singles charts and reached the top 40 on the German and Hungarian charts.

== Music video ==
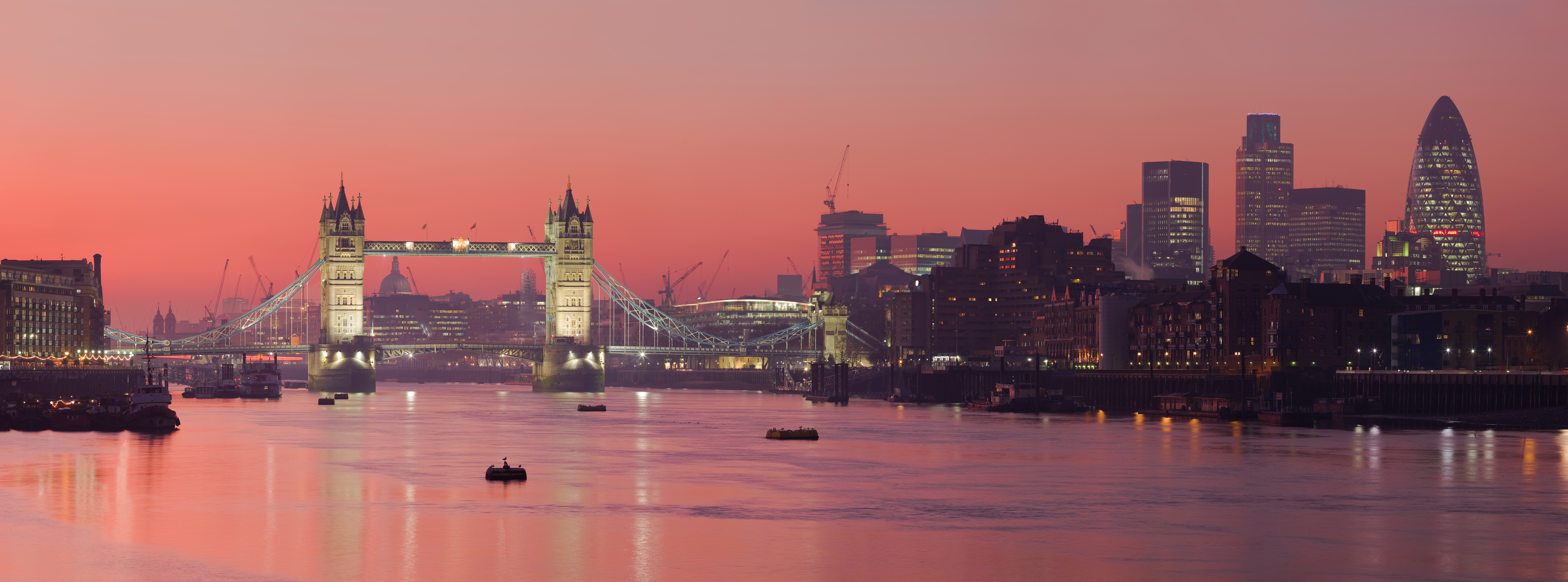
The music video for "Stronger" was filmed at a swimming pool in London.

The accompanying music video for "Stronger" was directed by Alison Murray. It was filmed in September 2002 in London. Range played a stripper in the video, while Buena portrayed a gangster's moll and Buchanan was a heartbroken woman at a support group. Range described being semi-naked in front of the camera as "weird, and very invasive". The video opens with a scene of Buena in a car driving through the streets in London, where she is sitting in the back seat next to a man talking on the phone. She builds up the courage to leave the man after the car stops at a red light. She gets out and walks away, leaving the man behind yelling at her.

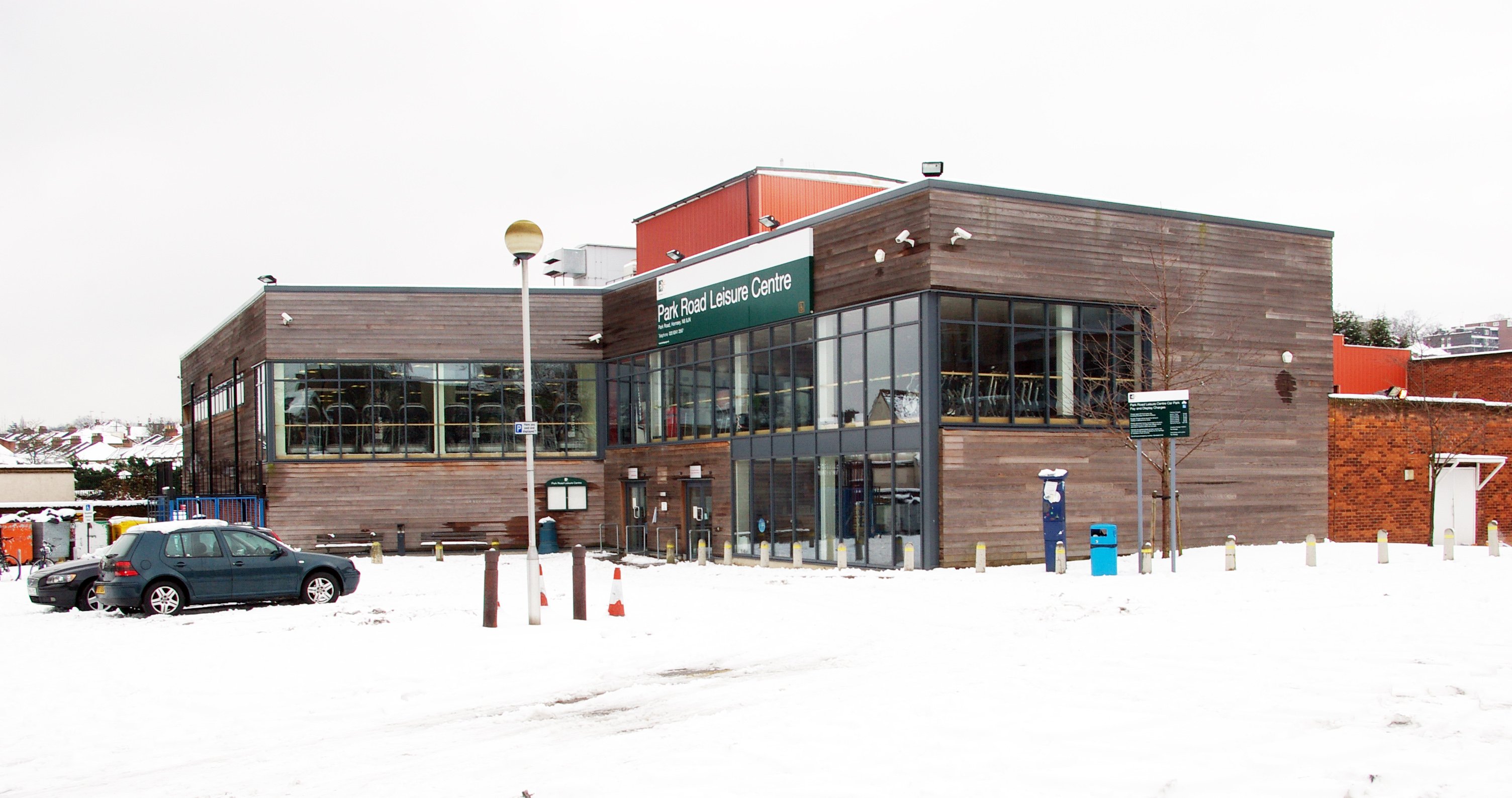
The music video was filmed at the pool at the Park Road Leisure Centre in Crouch End

The following scenes show Buchanan, Range and Buena at Park Road outdoor swimming pool in Crouch End; Buchanan is sitting on a chair, Range is standing in front of a fence, and Buena is sitting on the pool's stairs. Five women are later shown dancing simultaneously by the pool. The video cuts to Buchanan sitting in the middle of a support group in a room in a university, with a blackboard behind her reading "Heartbroken Anonymous". She later leaves the room, and the video then shows the Sugababes sitting on a bench near the pool. Range is shown on the stage in a nightclub disco as a stripper. Like Buena, she acts up the courage and leaves her profession. Meanwhile, all three Sugababes appear under the running water of a shower tap, and are shown dancing with the group of women from the previous scenes. The final scenes of the video show three children swimming underwater in the pool, resembling the members of the Sugababes.

== Live performances and other appearances ==
The Sugababes performed "Stronger" on 27 August 2002 during an Up Close gig for the launch of Angels with Dirty Faces, organised by Scottish Radio Holdings and the Royal Bank of Scotland. They performed the single on 5 October 2002 at the University of Leeds. The trio played "Stronger", along with many of their other songs, at the Edinburgh Corn Exchange on 18 August 2004. The song was performed by the band at the Edinburgh 50,000 – The Final Push concert in July 2005, which was part of the Live 8 concert series to persuade G8 leaders to increase the assistance of poverty in Africa. The performance received mixed reviews from critics, who considered it weak. "Stronger" was included in the set list for the group's 2004 tour in support of their album Three. In October 2006, the Sugababes performed it as part of an acoustic set with "Shape" at the 100 Club on Oxford Street, to promote the release of their greatest hits album, Overloaded: The Singles Collection.

"Stronger" appeared in the set list for the group's Overloaded tour, in which the performances were accompanied by footage of their Comic Relief trip to Africa. The band performed the song in December 2007 in Glasgow, Scotland, as part of an acoustic gig. The single also appeared on the set list for their 2008 Change Tour, in support of their fifth studio album Change. The Journal's Kat Keogh wrote that their performance at the Newcastle City Hall "displayed a confident shift from moody pop princesses to sassy Supremes-style harmony". The group performed "Stronger" on 27 June 2009 at the Cannock Chase Forrest as part of a 75-minute show, and on 10 July 2009 at County Durham's Riverside Ground along with many of their other singles. The fourth line-up of the Sugababes, consisting of Range, Amelle Berrabah and Jade Ewen, performed the song at the London Superclub in March 2010 as part of a gig.

The English musical theatre actor Lee Mead covered "Stronger" on his album, Lee Mead. Alex Fletcher of Digital Spy characterised the cover as "the only tune on the record with the sort of story-telling lyrics that are fitting for Mead's dramatic style", while Michael Quinn from the BBC described it as "more sweetly plaintive" than the Sugababes' version. "Stronger" was used in an anti-bullying PSA from Cybermentors that depicts a fifteen-year-old girl with her mouthed stitched up. The advertisement was banned from appearing on television, although it was permitted by the Cinema Advertising Association to appear in cinemas across Britain from 19 January 2010. The music video for "Stronger" became the subject of media attention in June 2011 after a member of Scotland's SlutWalk movement posted it on the group's website, claiming that it was in encouragement for victims of rape.

== Track listings and formats ==
- UK CD1 and Australian CD single
1. "Stronger"
2. "Angels with Dirty Faces" (Audio Drive Remix)
3. "Stronger" (Almighty Club Mix)
4. "Stronger" (Video)
- UK CD2
1. "Angels with Dirty Faces"
2. "Stronger" (Antoine909 Remix)
3. "Stronger" (Live at Leeds University, 5 October 2002)
4. "Angels with Dirty Faces" (video)
- UK cassette single
1. "Stronger"
2. "Angels with Dirty Faces"
3. "Stronger" (Almighty club mix)
- European CD single
1. "Stronger"
2. "Angels With Dirty Faces"
- European maxi-CD single
1. "Stronger"
2. "Stronger" (Almighty club mix)
3. "Groove Is Going On"
4. "Stronger" (video)
- UK 12-inch single
1. "Stronger" (Almighty club mix)
2. "Stronger" (Antoine909 Remix)
3. "Angels with Dirty Faces" (Audio Drive Remix)

== Personnel ==
- Songwriting – Keisha Buchanan, Mutya Buena, Heidi Range, Jony Rockstar, Marius de Vries, Felix Howard
- Production – Jony Rockstar
- Mixing – Tom Elmhirst, Jony Rockstar
- Recording – Tom Elmhirst
- Programming – Tom Elmhirst
- String arrangement – Chris Elliott
- Vocals – Keisha Buchanan, Mutya Buena, Heidi Range
- Guitar – Jeremy Shaw
- Bass guitar – Simon Benson
- Drums – Jony Rockstar
- Keyboards – Jony Rockstar
- Violin – Perry Montague-Mason, Chris Tombling, Dermot Crehan, Kathy Shave, Warren Zielinski, Mark Berrow, Julian Leaper, Simon Fischer, Benedict Cruft, Everton Nelson, Gavin Wright, Patrick Kiernan, David Woodcock, Jackie Shave, Rebecca Hirsch, Peter Hanson, Boguslav Kostecki
- Viola – Donald McVay, Philip Dukes, Rachel Bolt, Peter Lale, Timothy Grant, Bruce White, Zoe Lake
- Cello – David Bucknail, Michael Stirling, Chris Elliott, Naomi Wright, David Daniels, Frank Schaefer, Nick Cooper, Anthony Lewis
- Double bass – Mary Scully, Leon, Patrick Lannigan

Credits are taken from the liner notes of Overloaded: The Singles Collection.

== Charts ==
=== Weekly charts ===
Weekly chart performance for "Stronger"
| Chart (2002–2003) | Peak position |
|---|---|
| Australia (ARIA) with "Angels with Dirty Faces" | 34 |
| Austria (Ö3 Austria Top 40) | 41 |
| Belgium (Ultratop 50 Flanders) | 20 |
| Belgium (Ultratip Bubbling Under Wallonia) | 5 |
| Czech Republic (IFPI) | 9 |
| Denmark (Tracklisten) | 11 |
| Europe (Eurochart Hot 100) | 28 |
| Germany (GfK) | 38 |
| Hungary (Rádiós Top 40) | 34 |
| Ireland (IRMA) | 13 |
| Netherlands (Dutch Top 40) | 5 |
| Netherlands (Single Top 100) | 9 |
| New Zealand (Recorded Music NZ) with "Angels with Dirty Faces" | 24 |
| Norway (VG-lista) | 6 |
| Poland (Polish Airplay Charts) | 5 |
| Romania (Romanian Top 100) | 21 |
| Scottish Singles Sales (Official Charts) with "Angels with Dirty Faces" | 8 |
| Sweden (Sverigetopplistan) | 23 |
| Switzerland (Schweizer Hitparade) | 23 |
| UK Singles (Official Charts) with "Angels with Dirty Faces" | 7 |
| UK Airplay (Music Week) | 1 |

=== Yearly charts ===
2002 year-end chart performance for "Stronger"
| Chart (2002) | Position |
|---|---|
| UK Singles (OCC) | 118 |
| UK Airplay (Music Week) | 62 |

2003 year-end chart performance for "Stronger"
| Chart (2003) | Position |
|---|---|
| Netherlands (Dutch Top 40) | 29 |
| Netherlands (Single Top 100) | 59 |
| Romania (Romanian Top 100) | 87 |
| UK Airplay (Music Week) | 65 |

== Certifications ==
| Region | Certification | Certified units/sales |
|---|---|---|
| United Kingdom (BPI) | Silver | 200,000^{‡} |
^{‡} Sales+streaming figures based on certification alone.
