= Heidi Range =

English singer

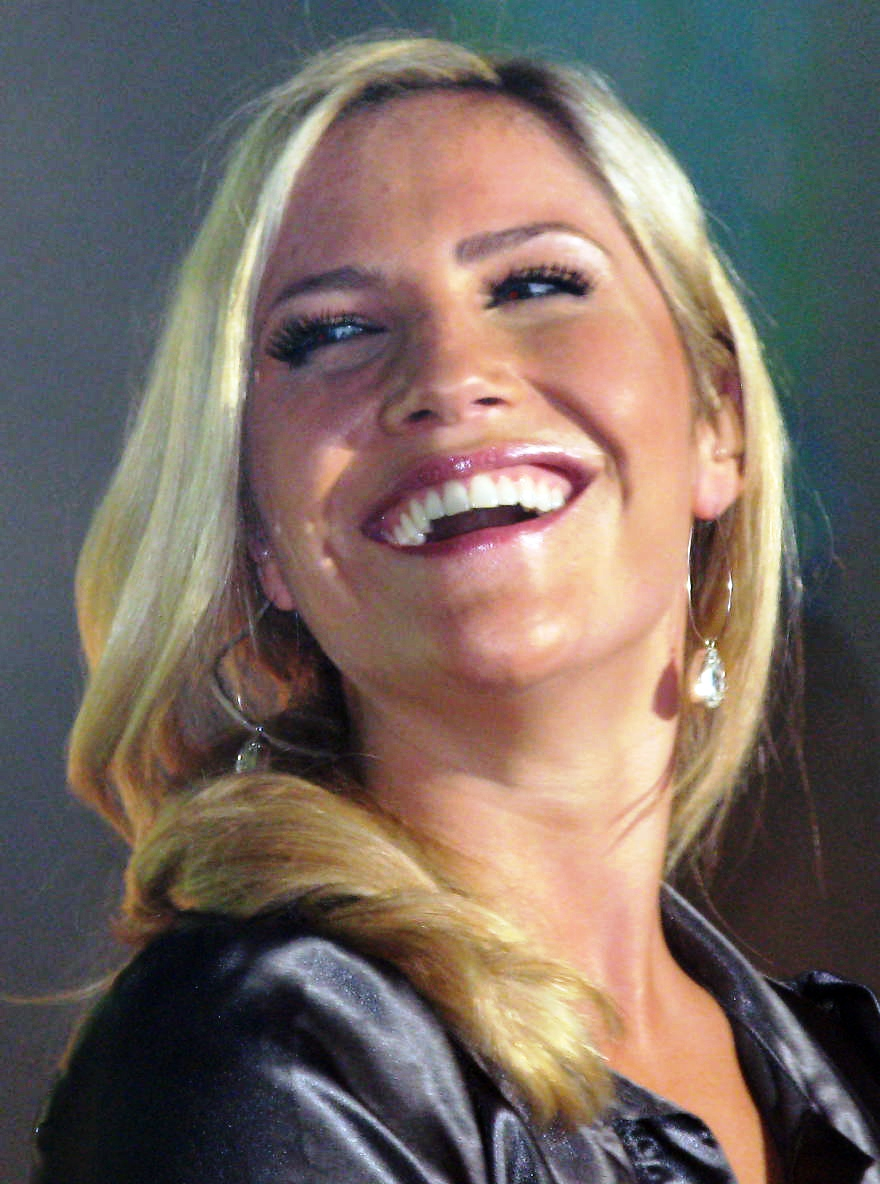
- Range in 2010

Background information
- Born: Heidi India Range; 23 May 1983 (age 43); Maghull, England
- Genres: Pop; R&B
- Occupation: Singer
- Years active: 1998–present
- Formerly of: Atomic Kitten; Sugababes
- Spouse: Alex Partakis (m. 2016)
- Partner: Dave Berry (2003–2011)

Heidi India Partakis (née Range; born 23 May 1983) is an English singer and songwriter, best known as a former member of the girl group Sugababes. In 2001, Range replaced original member Siobhán Donaghy in the Sugababes, after which the group enjoyed higher commercial success and accumulated six UK number-one singles as well as two number-one studio albums over the course of a decade, before the line-up at the time disbanded in 2011.

Since departing the group, Range has taken part in reality television series, Dancing on Ice (2012) and Celebrity MasterChef (2013), as well as appearing in theatre shows, Happy Days (2014) and The War of the Worlds (2016).

== Career ==
=== 1997–1999: Atomic Kitten ===
In 1997, Range auditioned for a part in the group Scooch, but was rejected as she was too young. Instead, she joined Atomic Kitten, a girl group founded by OMD frontman Andy McCluskey, along with Liz McClarnon and Kerry Katona. She recorded several demos for the group's debut album. In 1999, after 8 months of recording with Atomic Kitten, Range decided to leave the group after being offered a solo deal by Stock Aitken Waterman. Atomic Kitten therefore replaced Range with Natasha Hamilton.

=== 2001–2011: Sugababes ===
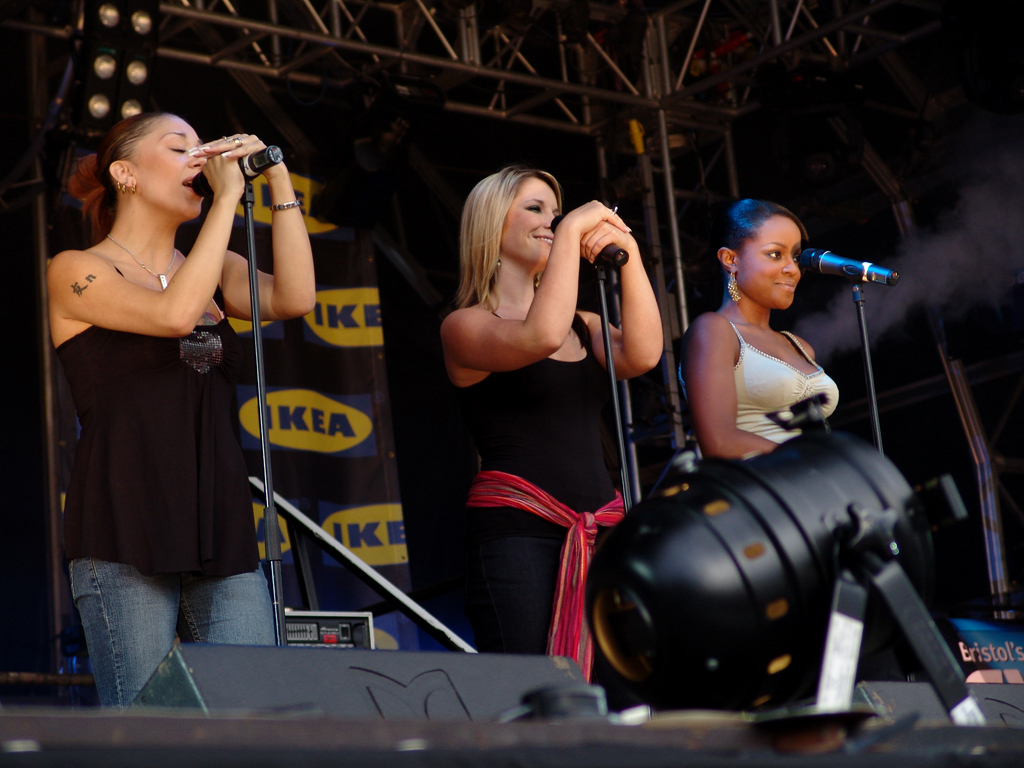
Range performing in her first line-up of Sugababes in May 2005

In August 2001, Range was recruited to audition as a new member of the Sugababes. Having already started work on a second album with new member Range, Sugababes looked for a new record label, eventually signing to Island Records. Their first single on the new label "Freak like Me" scored the group their first UK number 1 single. Follow-up single "Round Round" also debuted on top of the UK Singles Chart and peaked at number 2 in Ireland, the Netherlands, and New Zealand. Both singles were certified silver by the BPI. On the back of the success of the singles, the group's second album, Angels with Dirty Faces, debuted at number 2 on the UK Albums Chart and was later certified triple platinum, selling almost a million copies in the UK alone. It is to date their highest-selling album. In the UK, the third single from the album, a ballad titled "Stronger", gained the girls their third consecutive top ten hit in their native country. The track was released as a double-A side with "Angels with Dirty Faces" in the UK, the latter song chosen as the theme tune to The Powerpuff Girls Movie. A fourth single, the Sting-sampling "Shape", made the top ten in the Netherlands and Ireland in early 2003.

After a hiatus, the Sugababes released their thirteenth single, "Push the Button" in October 2005. The song debuted at number 1 in the UK and remained in the position for three consecutive weeks. It also peaked at number one in Ireland, Austria and New Zealand, and reached the top three across Europe and in Australia. Certified silver in the UK, it was later nominated at the BRIT Awards for Best Single. Their fourth album Taller in More Ways became the group's first UK number 1 album. The group was number 1 on the singles, album, airplay and download charts simultaneously, making them the first girl group to achieve such a feat. Taller in More Ways was certified double platinum in the UK.

In December 2005, founding member Mutya Buena departed the Sugababes and was replaced by Amelle Berrabah. The third single from Taller in More Ways was a re-recorded version of "Red Dress", which was released in early 2006, and gave the Sugababes their third consecutive top five hit from the album, entering the UK Singles Chart at number 4. Berrabah re-recorded three of the album's twelve tracks and co-wrote a new song with Keisha Buchanan and Range named "Now You're Gone". The tracks appeared on a re-release of Taller in More Ways that reached number 18 on the UK Albums Chart. The fourth and final single from Taller in More Ways was "Follow Me Home", released only in the UK in June, where it charted at number 32.

In the 2009 edition of the Guinness Book of World Records, "About You Now" was listed as the "first track by a British pop act to top the singles chart solely on downloads". The song was also named as the "biggest chart mover to the number one position in the UK".

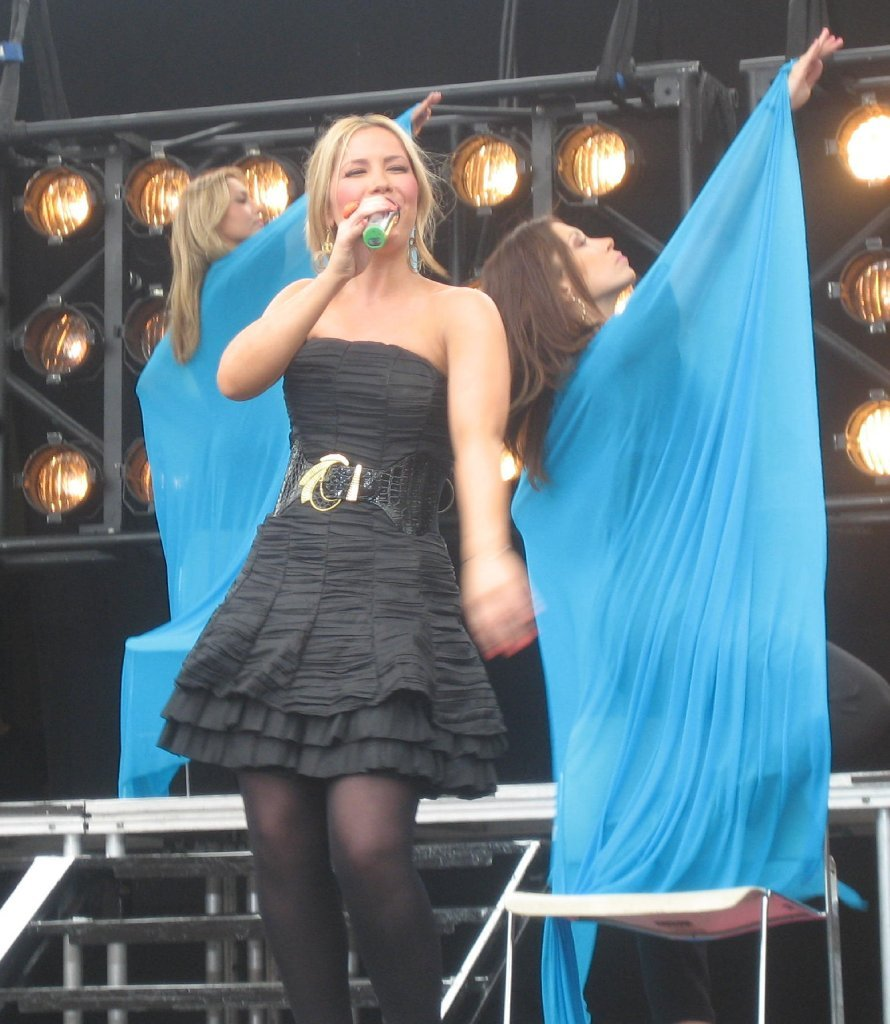
Range performing at the Vodafone TBA Concert in Edinburgh in 2008

After the release of "No Can Do", the group announced that there would be no 2009 tour in support of Catfights and Spotlights so that they could focus on writing and recording material for their seventh studio album. The Sugababes travelled to the United States to work on their seventh studio album, Sweet 7. In April 2009, the Sugababes signed a contract with Jay-Z's label Roc Nation, resulting in working with high-profile producers. The lead single from Sweet 7, "Get Sexy", debuted at number 2 on the UK Singles Chart in September 2009. In September 2009, Berrabah was reported to have left the Sugababes. She had missed two engagements promoting Sweet 7. However, on 21 September, it was revealed that Buchanan, the sole original member of the group, had left the Sugababes. Buchanan's place was filled by Jade Ewen, the UK's 2009 Eurovision Song Contest entrant. Berrabah and Range admitted that they played no role in Buchanan's departure. Both women had attempted to quit the Sugababes themselves only to find that their group's management decided that they would follow them, rather than find two new members for Buchanan. The new member, Ewen, was flown to the United States to film the music video for single "About a Girl" mere days after it was announced that Buchanan had left the group. "About a Girl" reached number 8 in the UK, during a truncated promotion schedule due to Berrabah flying to Austria for treatment for nervous exhaustion resulting from the line-up change. In late 2009, "Wear My Kiss" was confirmed for release in February 2010 as the third single, with the album, originally set for a late November 2009 release, delayed until March 2010. "Wear My Kiss" debuted and peaked at number 7 in the UK, making Sweet 7 the Sugababes' first album since Taller in More Ways to contain at least three top ten hits. The album debuted and peaked at number 14 in the UK.

In March 2010, former group member Mutya Buena applied to the European Trademarks Authority for ownership of the group's name. The application was submitted amid the controversy of Buchanan's departure, in which Buena insisted that "the Sugababes have ended" without a founding member still in the group. It was confirmed that Buena had obtained rights to use the name on paper, cardboard and goods; namely stationery, paper gift wrap and paper gift wrapping ribbons. It was also revealed in the same month that they were dropped by Roc Nation, due to poor sales of Sweet 7. On 1 July 2011, Buchanan approached the current line-up of Sugababes at the Barclaycard Wireless festival in London, where the girls were reported to have a "tear-eyed" reunion and put the past behind them. It was the first time in two years that Buchanan had seen former bandmates Range and Berrabah. In September 2011, the Sugababes released a new single, "Freedom", which was released as a free digital download. In September 2013, Ewen stated that the group had split, saying that they had "kind of fizzled out" two years prior. In January 2014, Range contradicted Ewen's statement, saying that the group was merely on hiatus to pursue solo projects. However, she later admitted in a June 2020 interview that the group had conceded in 2011 that it would not be fair for them to continue further due to the controversy and their declining popularity after Buchanan's departure.

=== 2012–present: Solo projects ===
In 2012, Range revealed she had been considering recording a solo album. Range appeared on the 2012 series of ITV1's Dancing on Ice. In 2013 Range took part in the 8th series of Celebrity MasterChef, but was the first to be eliminated. In 2014 she appeared as the lead female role of Pinky Tuscadero in a Happy Days musical touring the UK. In 2016, she appeared in the West End musical The War of the Worlds as Beth. In 2023, Range was a member of the United Kingdom jury for the Eurovision Song Contest.

== Personal life ==
Range was engaged to MTV and Capital London presenter Dave Berry, who proposed to her on New Year's Eve of 2003 while on holiday in India. Range had stated her intentions to marry in the winter of 2012, however in December 2011, Range stated that the couple had separated after eight years together. Range married Alex Partakis in Florence on 3 September 2016. Together they have two daughters, born in January 2018 and August 2021.

== Filmography ==
=== Television ===
Year	Title	Role	Notes	Ref.
2012	Dancing on Ice	Contestant	Series 7	
2012	I'm a Celebrity, Get Me Out of Here! Now!	Panelist	4 episodes	
2013	Celebrity MasterChef	Contestant	Series 8	
2019	The Hit List	Contestant	Episode: "Children in Need Special"	
2023	Abbey Clancy: Celebrity Homes	Contributor	Episode: "Heidi Range and Jodie Kidd"	
2025	Girlbands Forever	Contributor	BBC documentary	

== Stage ==
Year	Title	Role	Ref.
2014	Happy Days	Pinky Tuscadero	
2016	The War of the Worlds	Beth	

== Discography ==
Guest appearances
Title	Year	Album
"Sometimes"	2003	Three
"Change Your Wicked Ways"	2013	The Love This Collection, Vol. 2
"Money Can't Buy It"	2013	The Love This Collection, Vol. 3
"Everytime"	2013	The Love This Collection, Vol. 4
