= Freak like Me =

1995 single by Adina Howard

- Standard artwork (US CD maxi-single pictured)

Single by Adina Howard

from the album Do You Wanna Ride?
- Released: January 25, 1995
- Genre: R&B; hip-hop soul; G-funk
- Length: 4:13
- Label: East West; Lola Waxx
- Songwriters: Eugene Hanes; Marc Valentine; Loren Hill; William "Bootsy" Collins; George Clinton Jr.; Gary Lee Cooper
- Producer: Mass Order

Adina Howard singles chronology
"Freak like Me" (1995)	"My Up and Down" (1995)

Music video
- "Freak like Me" on YouTube

"Freak like Me" is a song by American R&B singer Adina Howard, released on January 25, 1995, by labels East West and Lola Waxx, as the debut single from her first album, Do You Wanna Ride? (1995). The song reached number two on the US Billboard Hot 100 for two weeks, as well as number two on the Billboard Hot R&B Singles chart for four weeks and was certified platinum by the Recording Industry Association of America (RIAA) for sales of one million copies. Its music video was directed by Hype Williams. In 2023, Billboard magazine ranked "Freak like Me" among the "500 Best Pop Songs of All Time". The song has been covered by several artists, most notably by British girl group Sugababes, who reached number one on the UK Singles Chart with their version in 2002.

== Background ==
"Freak like Me" is a R&B, hip-hop soul and G-funk song. The song's drum beat is sampled from Sly & the Family Stone's "Sing a Simple Song". It also interpolates "I'd Rather Be with You" by Bootsy's Rubber Band. Hence, Eugene Hanes, Marc Valentine, Loren Hill, William "Bootsy" Collins, and George Clinton's son George Jr. (the last of whom died in 2010) are credited as joint authors and composers. In honor of the song's 20th anniversary, a documentary focusing on the song's (and singer Adina Howard's) impact was released titled Adina Howard 20: A Story of Sexual Liberation. It received a nomination for "Outstanding Independent Documentary" at the 2016 Black Reel Awards.

== Critical reception ==
American Billboard magazine wrote, "The G-funkiest R&B smash of the '90s, using a Bootsy Collins interpolation, a Sly & The Family Stone sample and a Chronic-styled synth hook to attract that kind of man (because Adina Howard's that kind of girl)." Bill Speed from the Gavin Report stated that newcomer Howard "is hot with her debut single 'A Freak like Me', but don't be fooled by what appears to be another coochie song. It's way more than that." He concluded that it "will be one of those funky hip-hop flavored hits that all demos will enjoy." Chuck Campbell from Knoxville News Sentinel complimented its "memorable chorus". Everett True from Melody Maker found that the singer "provides sweet relief with another of those succulent, sensuous G-funk thangs which sounds like a cross between En Vogue and Snoop Doggy Dogg."

Alan Jones from Music Week felt "it's a record with immense pedigree; a softly percolating laidback soul/R&B nugget which reveals its subtle strength. With repeated plays it should dent the Top 40 this time and open up the market for Ms Howard's excellent album Do You Wanna Ride?" A reviewer from Music & Media wrote, "God-fearing she's only on the inside, cause the way she shamelessly shakes her ass to the sensual G-funk of the single 'Freak like Me' is enough to disturb the peace in any sincerely devout parish." Ralph Tee from the Record Mirror Dance Update said, "The track is pure hip hop soul combining Snoop Dogg and Dr. Dre beats and sounds with a style of vocal that's taken Brandy all the way with 'I Wanna Be Down'." Another Record Mirror editor, James Hamilton, described it as a "slinkily rolling r&b swayer" in his weekly dance column. Spin ranked "Freak like Me" number ten in their End-of-year list of the 20 best singles of 1995.

== Music video ==
The original music video for the song was directed by American director Hype Williams.

== Track listing ==
1. "Freak like Me" (radio version) – 4:04
2. "Freak like Me" (remix featuring rap by Inspector Rick) – 4:17
3. "Freak like Me" (dub instrumental) – 4:12
4. "Freak like Me" (remix without rap) – 4:06
5. "Freak like Me" (instrumental) – 4:10
6. "Freak like Me" (a cappella) – 2:35

== Charts ==
=== Weekly charts ===
Chart (1995)	Peak position
Netherlands (Dutch Top 40)	29
Netherlands (Single Top 100)	26
New Zealand (Recorded Music NZ)	22
UK Singles (Official Charts)	33
UK Dance (Official Charts)	7
UK Hip Hop/R&B (Official Charts)	7
UK Club Chart (Music Week)	53
US Billboard Hot 100	2
US Dance Singles Sales (Billboard)	4
US Hot R&B/Hip-Hop Songs (Billboard)	2
US Pop Airplay (Billboard)	20
US Rhythmic Airplay (Billboard)	1
US Cash Box Top 100	3

=== Year-end charts ===
Chart (1995)	Position
US Billboard Hot 100	13
US Hot R&B Singles (Billboard)	7
US Maxi-Singles Sales (Billboard)	15
US Cash Box Top 100	31

== Certifications ==
Region	Certification	Certified units/sales
New Zealand (RMNZ)	Gold	15,000^{‡}
United States (RIAA)	Platinum	1,000,000
^{‡} Sales+streaming figures based on certification alone.

== Tru Faith & Dub Conspiracy version ==
"Freak like Me"

Single by Tru Faith & Dub Conspiracy
- Released: August 28, 2000
- Genre: UK garage
- Length: 4:49
- Label: Positiva
- Songwriters: Eugene Hanes; Marc Valentine; Loren Hill; William "Bootsy" Collins; George Clinton Jr.; Gary Lee Cooper
- Producers: Andrew Hunter; George Demetriou; Ian McKenzie; Maxim Elmaki; Nial Montgomery

Imaani singles chronology
"Where Are You?" (1998)	"Freak like Me" (2000)

On August 28, 2000, a collaboration between two UK garage groups, Tru Faith & Dub Conspiracy, released a cover version of "Freak like Me". English singer Imaani provided vocals on the song. This version reached number 12 on the UK Singles Chart and number one on the UK Dance Singles Chart. The CD and 12-inch formats include remixes by Wideboys and Dome.

=== Track listings ===
- UK CD maxi-single
1. "Freak like Me" (radio edit) – 3:21
2. "Freak like Me" (original mix) – 4:49
3. "Freak like Me" (Wideboys Vocal Mix) – 5:01
4. "Freak like Me" (Dome's Freaky Deaky Mix) – 5:59
- UK 12-inch vinyl

A1. "Freak like Me" (original mix) – 4:49
A2. "Freak like Me" (Wideboys Dub) – 4:35
B1. "Freak like Me" (Vocal Remix) – 5:10
B2. "Freak like Me" (Freaky Deaky Mix) – 5:10

=== Charts ===
Chart (2000)	Peak position
Europe (Eurochart Hot 100)	44
Scottish Singles Sales (Official Charts)	31
UK Singles (Official Charts)	12
UK Dance (Official Charts)	1

== Sugababes version ==
"Freak like Me"

Single by Sugababes

from the album Angels with Dirty Faces
- B-side: "Breathe Easy"
- Released: April 22, 2002
- Recorded: 2001
- Studio: London, England
- Genre: Electropop; R&B; funk
- Length: 3:14
- Label: Island; Universal
- Songwriters: Eugene Hanes; Marc Valentine; Loren Hill; William Collins; George Clinton; Gary Numan
- Producer: Richard X

Sugababes singles chronology
"Soul Sound" (2001)	"Freak like Me" (2002)	"Round Round" (2002)

Music video
- "Freak like Me" on YouTube

In 2002, English girl group Sugababes recorded a cover of "Freak like Me". Conceived and produced by English producer Richard X, the cover samples the 1979 song "Are "Friends" Electric?" by Gary Numan and Tubeway Army. In 2001, Richard X had created a bootleg mashup of the original recordings of "Freak like Me" and "Are "Friends" Electric?", titled "We Don't Give a Damn About Our Friends", which he released under the alias Girls on Top. That song became a successful underground dance track. Richard X wanted to release the mashup commercially, but he could not get permission from Howard to use her vocals, so he enlisted the Sugababes to re-record the vocals.

"Freak like Me" was released on April 22, 2002, as the lead single from their second studio album, Angels with Dirty Faces (2002). It was the first Sugababes single to feature Heidi Range, who joined after the departure of Siobhán Donaghy in August 2001. The Sugababes version blends the original recording's samples into an R&B and rock track. This version of the song used the radio edit lyrics of Howard's song ("brotha" is used instead of "nigga"). Numan was now credited as a co-writer of the song. A remix of the song, billed as the "We Don't Give a Damn Mix", was used for the video and also appears on Richard X's 2003 album Richard X Presents His X-Factor Vol. 1.

=== Critical reception ===
The Guardian named "Freak like Me" as the best number-one single of 2002. NME complimented the track as "genius" and claimed, "if this gets to number one, we'll be grinning all summer. Yes, even The Critics." Billboard named the song number 45 on their list of 100 Greatest Girl Group Songs of All Time.

Numan considered the Sugababes version of "Freak like Me" to be better than "Are 'Friends' Electric?". Numan met the Sugababes for the first time at the 2002 Q Awards, where he presented them with the award for Best Single.

=== Chart performance ===
"Freak like Me" was released in the United Kingdom on April 22, 2002. The song became Sugababes' first number-one single when it debuted at number one on the UK Singles Chart, selling nearly 85,500 copies in its first week, and remaining in the top 10 for four weeks. The British Phonographic Industry certified the song gold for selling and streaming over 400,000 units. It was the tenth most played song on UK Radio in 2002, with a total audience of 1.131 billion and 36,968 plays.)

Outside of the United Kingdom, the song was also successful: it reached the top 10 in Flanders, Ireland, and Norway. In Australia, "Freak like Me" was released on June 17, 2002, and became the fourth single by Sugababes to make the singles chart, reaching number 44. It would be their lowest-charting single in Australia until the release of "Shape" in 2003.

=== Music video ===
The music video was directed by Dawn Shadforth and Sophie Muller and was filmed in London. It uses the "We Don't Give a Damn Mix" of the song, which is more faithful to the original mash-up. Set in a strange nightclub, the video serves to introduce then-recently added member Heidi Range. It begins outside the nightclub with a man tumbling down the stairs, with Keisha Buchanan in a long coat, seen only from below the knee, walking out of a door, over the man's body and up the stairs. Mutya Buena is seen standing on the stairs facing the direction where the man is lying. Inside, they spot Range dancing and flirting with many guys. They both quickly clash with her, and a fight between them ensues, which ends with Range falling to the floor unconscious. A man tries to help her up, but Buena grabs him by the neck and throws him away from her. Range wakes up again soon after, and stumbles out of the club with another man, where they begin to kiss, until she suddenly bites hard into his arm. Meanwhile, Buchanan takes a man outside, and she leads him into a dark alley, where they flirt briefly, before she scares him away. Buena then goes outside as well, and overpowers a man who towers over her. The music video ends with Buchanan and Buena accepting Range into the group, and dancing into the night. The demonstrations of supernatural strength shown throughout the video and Range biting the man on the arm are generally understood to imply that the women are, as the song suggests, vampire-like "freaks." Julian Morris stars in the music video as one of the boys running from Buena.

=== Track listings ===
UK and Australian CD single
No.	Title	Writer(s)	Producer(s)	Length
1.	"Freak like Me" (radio edit)	Eugene Hanes; Marc Valentine; Loren Hill; William Collins; George Clinton; Gary Numan	Richard X; Jeremy Wheatley^{[a]}	3:14
2.	"Freak like Me" (We Don't Give a Damn mix)	Hanes; Valentine; Hill; Collins; Clinton; Numan	Richard X	3:39
3.	"Breathe Easy"	Craig Dodds; Keisha Buchanan; Mutya Buena; Heidi Range	Dodds	4:09
4.	"Freak like Me" (video)

UK 12-inch single
No.	Title	Writer(s)	Producer(s)	Length
1.	"Freak like Me" (Different Gear mix)	Hanes; Valentine; Hill; Collins; Clinton; Numan	Richard X; Different Gear^{[a]}	5:01
2.	"Freak like Me" (We Don't Give a Damn mix)	Hanes; Valentine; Hill; Collins; Clinton; Numan	Richard X	3:34
3.	"Freak like Me" (Capoeira Twins mix)	Hanes; Valentine; Hill; Collins; Clinton; Numan	Richard X; Capoeira Twins^{[a]}	5:29
4.	"Freak like Me" (Jameson mix)	Hanes; Valentine; Hill; Collins; Clinton; Numan	Richard X; Jameson^{[a]}	5:42

UK cassette single
No.	Title	Writer(s)	Producer(s)	Length
1.	"Freak like Me" (radio edit)	Hanes; Valentine; Hill; Collins; Clinton; Numan	Richard X; Wheatley^{[a]}	3:14
2.	"Freak like Me" (We Don't Give a Damn mix)	Hanes; Valentine; Hill; Collins; Clinton; Numan	Richard X	3:39
3.	"Freak like Me" (Jameson mix)	Hanes; Valentine; Hill; Collins; Clinton; Numan	Richard X; Jameson^{[a]}	5:46

European CD single
No.	Title	Writer(s)	Producer(s)	Length
1.	"Freak like Me" (radio edit)	Hanes; Valentine; Hill; Collins; Clinton; Numan	Richard X; Wheatley^{[a]}
2.	"Freak like Me" (We Don't Give a Damn mix)	Hanes; Valentine; Hill; Collins; Clinton; Numan	Richard X

Notes

- ^{^a} denotes additional producer(s)

=== Charts ===
==== Weekly charts ====
Chart (2002)	Peak position
Australia (ARIA)	44
Austria (Ö3 Austria Top 40)	22
Belgium (Ultratip Bubbling Under Wallonia)	1
Belgium (Ultratop 50 Flanders)	10
Canada (Nielsen SoundScan)	40
Denmark (Tracklisten)	13
Europe (Eurochart Hot 100)	9
Germany (GfK)	27
Ireland (IRMA)	2
Italy (FIMI)	29
Netherlands (Dutch Top 40)	23
Netherlands (Single Top 100)	31
New Zealand (Recorded Music NZ)	25
Norway (VG-lista)	4
Romania (Romanian Top 100)	28
Scottish Singles Sales (Official Charts)	1
Sweden (Sverigetopplistan)	27
Switzerland (Schweizer Hitparade)	11
UK Singles (Official Charts)	1
UK Airplay (Music Week)	1
UK Hip Hop/R&B (Official Charts)	1

==== Year-end charts ====
Chart (2002)	Position
Belgium (Ultratop 50 Flanders)	62
Ireland (IRMA)	40
UK Singles (OCC)	28
UK Airplay (Music Week)	10

=== Certifications ===
Region	Certification	Certified units/sales
United Kingdom (BPI)	Gold	466,000

=== Release history ===
Region	Date	Format(s)	Label(s)	Ref(s).
United Kingdom	April 22, 2002	12-inch vinyl; CD; cassette	Island	
Australia	June 17, 2002	CD	Island	
United States	February 3, 2003	Contemporary hit radio	Universal	
