= Edinburgh 50,000 – The Final Push =

2005 benefit concert in Edinburgh, Scotland

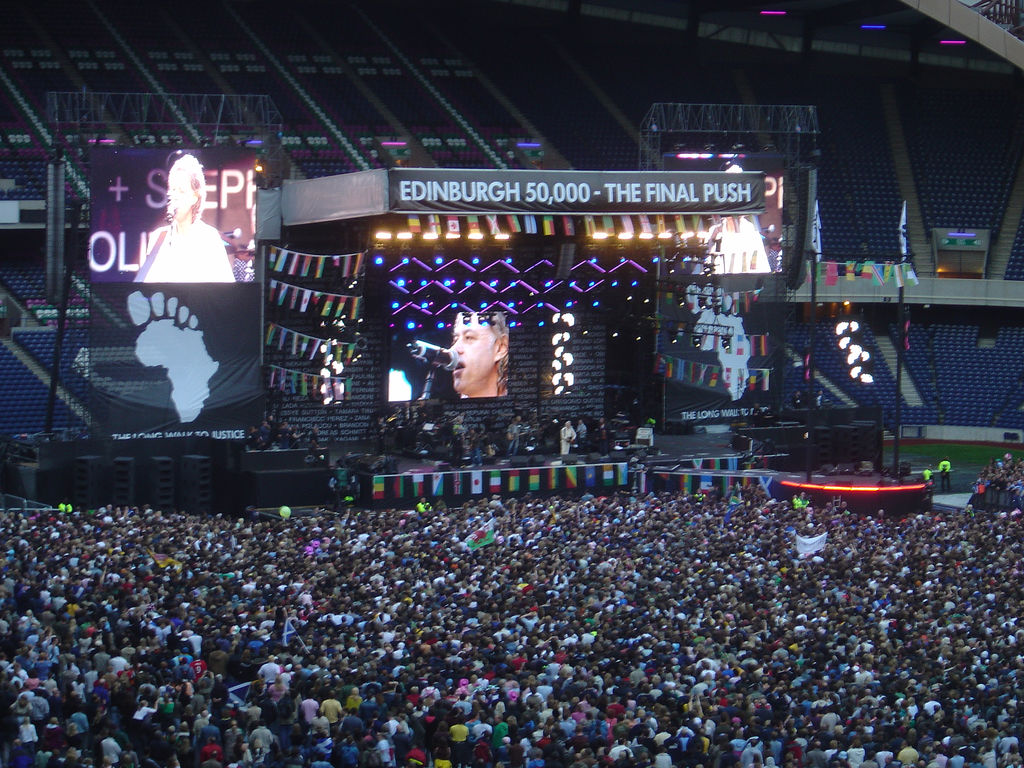
Concert inside Murrayfield Stadium

Edinburgh 50,000 – The Final Push was part of the series of Live 8 concerts held around the world designed to encourage the leaders congregating at the G8 summit in Gleneagles, Scotland, to consider the plight of those in absolute poverty (see Make Poverty History). Held on 6 July 2005, four days after the other concerts, at Murrayfield Stadium, Edinburgh, Scotland, it coincided with the opening day of the 31st G8 summit and a rally in the city centre marking the end of Live 8.

The event is also referred to as "Live 8 Edinburgh" and "Live 8 Scotland".

Tickets were allocated by a text lottery. As with the Hyde Park Live 8 concert it overran its official finishing time.

== Line-up ==
The full line-up of performers:

- Lenny Henry (Host)
- The Proclaimers – "I'm Gonna Be (500 Miles)"
- Jamie Cullum – "All You Need Is Love" (with Natasha Bedingfield)
- Natasha Bedingfield – "These Words" (with Jamie Cullum)
- Wet Wet Wet – "With a Little Help from My Friends", "Love Is All Around" (with instrumentals from "Scotland the Brave" and "Loch Lomond")
- Davina McCall (presenter)
- Peter Kay – "Top of the World"
- McFly – "All About You"
- Eddie Izzard (presenter)
- 1 Giant Leap – "My Culture"
- Eddie Izzard – "Flower of Scotland"
- Sugababes – "Stronger"
- Bono (presenter)
- Nelson Mandela (presenter)
- George Clooney (presenter)
- Annie Lennox – "Redemption Song", "Sisters Are Doin' It for Themselves"
- Coumi Nidu (presenter)
- Susan Sarandon (presenter)
- Bob Geldof and Campino – "The Great Song of Indifference", "Rat Trap"
- The Thrills – "Santa Cruz (You're Not That Far)"
- Claudia Schiffer and Herbert Grönemeyer (presenters)
- Midge Ure – "Vienna" (with Eddie Izzard on piano and Troy Donockley on bouzouki)
- Chris Evans (presenter)
- Feeder – "Buck Rogers"
- Wangari Maathai (presenter)
- Youssou N'Dour and Neneh Cherry – "7 Seconds"
- Chris Barrie and the cast of The Brittas Empire (comedy sketch)
- Embrace – "Ashes"
- Beverley Knight
- Texas – "Inner Smile", "Say What You Want"
- Katherine Jenkins – "Nessun dorma"
- Snow Patrol – "Run"
- Ronan Keating (presenter)
- Travis – "Driftwood", "Why Does It Always Rain on Me?"
- The Corrs - "Breathless", "When the Stars Go Blue" (with Bono)
- James Brown – "I Feel Good", "Papa's Got a Brand New Bag", "Sex Machine" (with Will Young)
