= Cybermentors =

Peer mentoring service

CyberMentors was an online peer mentoring service for children and young people aged 11–18, delivered through a social networking site at cybermentors.org.uk. CyberMentors was delivered by the UK charity Beatbullying. CyberMentors was rebranded to be known as BeatBullying Mentors however the service now seems to have disappeared all together with the beatbullying domain now redirecting to a premium online therapy company.

The old CyberMentors website can be viewed via the Wayback Machine snapshot from 02/01/2013

== History and Scope ==
CyberMentors was launched in March 2009 by the former British Prime Minister Gordon Brown. In 2009 Beatbullying won the Third Sector Excellence Award for best use of digital media for CyberMentors.

== Activities ==
CyberMentors offers advice and guidance for young people who are affected by both cyber and offline bullying, by allowing them to connect online with trained “CyberMentors,” who are 11–18, “Senior CyberMentors” who are 18–25, and fully trained online counsellors.

According to Beatbullying, as of November 2009 there were 1815 CyberMentors, 40 volunteer counsellors, 15 full-time and three part-time staff on CyberMentors, and the site had 217,157 unique users.

== Training ==
Beatbullying also offers training in schools to those that wish to become CyberMentors. The training is qualified at an ASDAN level, and covers topics such as Child Protection and Self Harming.

== Referral Sites ==
Many schools across the UK have set up "Referral Sites" whereby students can access CyberMentors services from anywhere. Two of the most successful examples of this are Horbury School's CyberMentors and SWCC CyberMentors.
