= Angels with Dirty Faces (Sugababes album) =

2002 studio album by Sugababes

Studio album by Sugababes
- Released: 26 August 2002
- Genres: Pop; electronica; R&B
- Length: 41:30
- Label: Island
- Producers: Lucas Secon; Bloodshy & Avant; Robin Boult; Robbie Bronnimann; Craigie Dodds; Fredro; Howard Jones; Jony Rockstar; Ron Tom; Jeremy Wheatley; Richard X; Xenomania

Sugababes chronology
One Touch (2000)	Angels with Dirty Faces (2002)	Three (2003)

Singles from Angels with Dirty Faces
- 1. "Freak Like Me" Released: 22 April 2002; 2. "Round Round" Released: 12 August 2002; 3. "Stronger" / "Angels with Dirty Faces" Released: 11 November 2002; 4. "Shape" Released: 10 March 2003

Angels with Dirty Faces is the second studio album by British girl group Sugababes. Released by Island Records on 26 August 2002 in the United Kingdom and across most European territories the following month, it was the group's first album for the label following their departure from London Records and their first full studio album recorded with Heidi Range, who replaced founding member Siobhán Donaghy. Influenced by the new wave, dance, and pop music of the 1980s, production on Angels with Dirty Faces was handled by a range of collaborators, including Lucas Secon, Bloodshy & Avant, Fredro, Richard X, Xenomania, Kevin Bacon, Jonathan Quarmby, and others.

The album received generally positive reviews from critics, who praised its darker, more mature sound and regarded it as a strong follow-up that largely fulfilled the promise of its hit singles. Commercially, it marked the Sugababes' breakthrough, substantially outperforming their debut album One Touch by peaking at number two on the UK Albums Chart and reaching the top 20 in several European markets, including Austria, Belgium, Germany, the Netherlands, Norway, and Switzerland. It achieved 3× Platinum certification in the United Kingdom, sold approximately 929,000 units there by 2020, and earned a Platinum Europe Award for sales exceeding one million copies across Europe.

The album's singles significantly outperformed those from previous album One Touch, establishing the Sugababes as a major commercial force. Both "Freak Like Me" and "Round Round" reached number one in the UK, while the double-A single "Stronger"/"Angels with Dirty Faces" and "Shape" also achieved top-20 UK positions. In further promotion of the album, Sugababes embarked on the Angels with Dirty Faces Tour in 2003, serving as the group's first major headline tour and featuring dates across the United Kingdom and Europe. The album won Best Album at the 2002 Smash Hits Poll Winners Party and was nominated for British Album of the Year at the 2003 BRIT Awards.

== Background ==
In November 2000, London Records released Sugababes' debut album One Touch. The album was critically acclaimed for its mature songwriting and its blend of R&B, pop, and soul delivered by the young group members, and it produced the international top-ten single and breakthrough hit "Overload." Initial UK sales were modest however, and though it later reached number 26 on the UK Albums Chart and earned a Gold certification from the British Phonographic Industry (BPI), it enjoyed a stronger performance in New Zealand and other parts of Europe, particularly in German-speaking Europe, where it reached the top ten in Austria, Germany, and Switzerland. Despite also generating two further top-20 singles, "New Year" and "Run for Cover," and BRIT Award nomination for "Overload," One Touch ultimately fell short of London Records' commercial expectations.

Shortly after the release of the album's final single, "Soul Sound," group member and co-founder Siobhán Donaghy left Sugababes, citing personal differences within the group and her desire to pursue a different career path, although she later revealed that she had experienced clinical depression during this period and that the group's internal dynamics had shifted significantly. Although London Records had indicated that the group's contract termination was being considered, remaining members Mutya Buena and Keisha Buchanan opted to continue the group. Auditions were subsequently held to find a replacement, and former Atomic Kitten member Heidi Range was ultimately selected to join. Shortly thereafter, London Records announced that it would drop the band. Following their departure, Sugababes began seeking a new record deal while already developing material for their second studio album. They were approached by A&R manager Darcus Beese, who offered them a recording contract with Universal Island, which they ultimately accepted.

== Promotion ==
"Freak Like Me", which samples Gary Numan's "Are 'Friends' Electric?", was the first released single and entered the UK Singles Chart at number one. "Round Round", produced by Xenomania, was the second released single and also debuted on the UK chart at number one. The third single released was a double A-side release of "Stronger" and "Angels with Dirty Faces", which reached number seven on the UK Singles Chart. The last single, "Shape", which samples Sting's single "Shape of My Heart", was the only one from the album not to achieve a position in the top ten of the UK Singles Chart; it entered at number eleven. The song, however, did reach the top ten in Poland (number one), Ireland (number nine) and the Netherlands (number ten).

== Critical reception ==
Professional ratings
Review scores
Source	Rating
AllMusic	3.5/5 stars
Drowned in Sound	10/10
The Guardian	2/5 stars
laut.de	3/5 stars
MTV Asia	7/10
NME	3.5/5 stars
Yahoo! Music	8/10

AllMusic editor Andy Kellman called Angels with Dirty Faces "one of the best pop albums of 2002" and "an assured and durable follow-up to 2001's formative One Touch," praising it as a "thoroughly convincing amalgamation" of influences grounded in contemporary trends, noting that it "does not lose steam”" across its first half and remains "a pop album that offers much more depth and excitement beyond the singles." David Merryweather of Drowned in Sound framed the album as a form of subversive modern pop, arguing that energy once associated with guitar-based punk had shifted into "inner-city, multi-cultural, female, no guitars" pop. He called it an "utterly brilliant pop album," highlighting its UK garage and R&B identity and singles like "Freak Like Me" and "Round Round" as defiant, "sulkily dallying behind the beat" statements. MTV Asia critic Lennat Mak called the album a "winning mix of smooth R&B, dirty garage beats and irresistible hooks." He praised its urban garage direction, catchy familiarity, and darker moments like "Virgin Sexy," concluding it was a consistent, well-produced set driven by attitude, edge, and strong singles.

Yahoo! Music's Andy described the record as a "far darker set than One Touch" and a more focused second album, even if it came "at a price," noting a loss of some of the debut's experimentation while still predicting it would be a bigger commercial hit and calling it "good work girls." NME critic Alex Needham took a more mixed stance, arguing that "about half" of the album lived up to its two strong lead singles. While criticizing "Shape" and other "bog-standard R&B" moments, he still described the record as a "triumph." Hot Press editor Phil Udell felt that only the standout single "Freak Like Me" fully carried the album, writing that much of it "falls so far short of matching its undoubted highpoint," with only songs like "Round Round" and "Stronger" offering relief from an otherwise "disappointing spiral" of uniform production, despite praising the group’s vocals and harmonies. German magazine Stern was more critical of the album's glossy production, describing it as a highly synthetic R&B/soul-pop record influenced by artists like Madonna and Destiny's Child, but ultimately "overproduced and polished," with "a bit too much Britney Spears, a bit too much cotton candy," suggesting its early promise was not fully sustained. The Guardian's Alexis Petridis was the most negative, arguing that the album often feels like a reaction to the success of "Freak Like Me" without clear direction, calling it "one great single propping up a dull album, written by committee, devoid of emotion or spark."

== Chart performance ==
Angels with Dirty Faces served as a commercial breakthrough for the group, and majorly outperformed their previous album One Touch (2000). Released on 26 August 2002 in the United Kingdom, it debuted and peaked at number two on the UK Albums Chart, behind Coldplay's A Rush of Blood to the Head with first week sales of 65,000 copies, selling more copies in seven days than One Touch in its first seven weeks. The album remained within the top 100 for forty weeks and was eventually certified Silver by the British Phonographic Industry (BPI) on 26 August 2002. It has since reached 3× Platinum in the United Kingdom. By August 2020, Angels with Dirty Faces had sold 929,000 units, domestically.

Almost a month after the album's UK release, Angels with Dirty Faces was also released across Europe and in New Zealand, where it gained considerable success. The album received a Platinum Europe Award by the International Federation of the Phonographic Industry (IFPI) in recognition of European sales in excess of one million copies.

== Track listing ==
Angels with Dirty Faces track listing
No.	Title	Writer(s)	Producer(s)	Length
1.	"Freak Like Me"	Eugene Hanes; Marc Valentine; Loren Hill; William Collins; George Clinton; Gary Numan	Richard X; Jeremy Wheatley^{[a]}	3:17
2.	"Blue"	Keisha Buchanan; Mutya Buena; Heidi Range; Howard Jones; Robbie Bronniman; Robin Boult	Jones; Bronniman; Boult; Wheatley^{[a]}	3:56
3.	"Round Round"	Brian Higgins; Miranda Cooper; Lisa Cowling; Nick Coler; Buchanan; Buena; Range; Florian Pflueger; Felix Stecher; Robin Hofmann; Rino Spadavecchia; Richard Baxter (uncredited); Jerry Ross (uncredited)	Kevin Bacon; Jonathan Quarmby; Wheatley^{[a]}	3:57
4.	"Stronger"	Jony Lipsey; Marius De Vries; Felix Howard; Buchanan; Buena; Range	Jony Rockstar	4:00
5.	"Supernatural"	Christian Karlsson; Pontus Winnberg; Michelle Bell	Bloodshy & Avant	3:37
6.	"Angels with Dirty Faces"	Higgins; Bob Bradley; Tim Powell; Cooper; Matthew Del Gray; Buchanan; Buena; Range	Higgins; Bradley; Powell; Gifford Noel	3:48
7.	"Virgin Sexy"	Buchanan; Buena; Range; Lucas Secon; Mary-Ann Morgan	Secon	3:45
8.	"Shape"	Sting; Dominic Miller; Craigie Dodds	Dodds; Bacon^{[a]}; Quarmby^{[a]}	4:14
9.	"Just Don't Need This" (UK & Japan bonus track)	Lipsey; Howard; Jeremy Shaw; Buchanan; Buena; Range	Rockstar	3:32
10.	"No Man No Cry" (UK & Japan bonus track)	Dodds; Buchanan; Buena; Range	Dodds	3:34
11.	"Switch"	Howard; Frederick Odesjo; Henrick Jonback; Nina Woodford; Buchanan; Buena; Range	Fredro	3:37
12.	"More Than a Million Miles"	Secon; Morgan; Buchanan; Buena; Range	Secon	3:24
13.	"Breathe Easy" (acoustic jam)	Dodds; Buchanan; Buena; Range	Dodds	3:59
14.	"Round Round" (alternative mix) (UK & Japan bonus track)	Higgins; Cooper; Cowling; Coler; Buchanan; Buena; Range; Pflueger; Stecher; Hofmann; Spadavecchia; Baxter (uncredited); Ross (uncredited)	Higgins; Powell	6:07

Notes and sample credits

- ^{^[a]} denotes additional producer
- "Freak like Me" contains an interpolation from "Are Friends Electric?" performed by Tubeway Army and a cover song of the same name by Adina Howard.
- "Round Round" contains a sample from "Tango Forte" by German production team Dublex Inc., which itself is based around an unaccredited sample of "Whatever Lola Wants", performed by Les Baxter.
- "Shape" samples from "Shape of My Heart" performed by Sting.

== Charts ==
=== Weekly charts ===
Weekly chart performance for Angels with Dirty Faces
Chart (2002)	Peak position
Australian Albums (ARIA)	120
Austrian Albums (Ö3 Austria)	19
Belgian Albums (Ultratop Flanders)	15
Belgian Albums (Ultratop Wallonia)	48
Danish Albums (Hitlisten)	37
Dutch Albums (Album Top 100)	12
Finnish Albums (Suomen virallinen lista)	32
German Albums (Offizielle Top 100)	13
Irish Albums (IRMA)	3
Japanese Albums (Oricon)	178
New Zealand Albums (RMNZ)	21
Norwegian Albums (VG-lista)	11
Scottish Albums (Official Charts)	2
Swedish Albums (Sverigetopplistan)	49
Swiss Albums (Schweizer Hitparade)	13
UK Albums (Official Charts)	2
European Albums (Eurotipsheet)	11

=== Year-end charts ===
2002 year-end chart performance for Angels with Dirty Faces
Chart (2002)	Position
Dutch Albums (Album Top 100)	100
UK Albums (OCC)	25

2003 year-end chart performance for Angels with Dirty Faces
Chart (2003)	Position
Dutch Albums (Album Top 100)	50
UK Albums (OCC)	54

== Certifications ==
Certifications for Angels with Dirty Faces
Region	Certification	Certified units/sales
Netherlands (NVPI)	Gold	40,000^{^}
Switzerland (IFPI Switzerland)	Gold	20,000^{^}
United Kingdom (BPI)	3× Platinum	929,000
Summaries
Europe (IFPI)	Platinum	1,000,000^{*}
^{*} Sales figures based on certification alone.^{^} Shipments figures based on certification alone.

== Release history ==
Angels with Dirty Faces release history
Region	Date	Format(s)	Edition(s)	Label	Ref.
United Kingdom	26 August 2002	CD	Standard	Island Records	
United Kingdom	19 October 2024	LP	Standard	Island Records	
