= Round Round =

2002 single by Sugababes

Single by Sugababes

from the album Angels with Dirty Faces
- B-side: "Groove Is Going On"
- Released: 12 August 2002
- Genre: Dance-pop
- Length: 3:54
- Label: Island; Universal
- Songwriters: Brian Higgins; Miranda Cooper; Lisa Cowling; Tim Powell; Nick Coler; Keisha Buchanan; Mutya Buena; Heidi Range; Florian Pflueger; Felix Stecher; Robin Hofmann; Rino Spadavecchia
- Producers: Kevin Bacon; Jonathan Quarmby

Sugababes singles chronology
"Freak like Me" (2002)	"Round Round" (2002)	"Stronger" / "Angels with Dirty Faces" (2002)

Audio sample
- file; help

Music video
- "Round Round" on YouTube

"Round Round" is a song performed by British girl group Sugababes. It was written by group members Keisha Buchanan, Mutya Buena, and Heidi Range, as well as Miranda Cooper, Brian Higgins, Tim Powell, Nick Coler, and Lisa Cowling. It samples the song "Tango Forte" by German production team Dublex Inc., so the songwriters of that track are credited as well. Produced by Kevin Bacon and Jonathan Quarmby, the song was released as the second single from the group's second studio album, Angels with Dirty Faces (2002).

Following its release on 12 August 2002, "Round Round" peaked at number one on the UK Singles Chart, becoming the group's second number-one single domestically. In August 2022, it was certified gold by the British Phonographic Industry (BPI). "Round Round" also reached the top 10 in Austria, Ireland, Italy, and New Zealand, among other countries. In 2003, it became the group's first single to chart in the United States, peaking at number seven on the Billboard Dance Singles Sales chart. Alongside "Sound of the Underground" by Girls Aloud, this song has been credited in reshaping British pop music for the 2000s.

== Background ==
"Round Round" was written by Brian Higgins, Miranda Cooper, Lisa Cowling, Tim Powell, Nick Coler, Keisha Buchanan, Mutya Buena, and Heidi Range. Due to the inclusion of a sample from "Tango Forte" by Dublex Inc., Florian Pflueger, Felix Stecher, Robin Hofmann, and Rino Spadavecchia are also credited as songwriters. In turn, "Tango Forte" is based around an uncredited sample from "Whatever Lola Wants" performed by American composer Les Baxter. Production on "Round Round" was helmed by Kevin Bacon and Jonathan Quarmby for Manna Productions based on an original track Higgins and Powell had created for Xenomania Records, while Jeremy Wheatley provided additional production and handled the mixing. Guitar recording and programming were overseen by Yoad Nevo for 247 Artists.

Musically, "Round Round" was actually built up of a number of different songs. On the BBC2 series Secrets of the Pop Song, Brian Higgins described the genesis of the song: "We had a drum track which was just stunning and so I sat down with Miranda [Cooper] on the one day we had the Sugababes in the studio and said 'Right, you know, this is a hit, this piece of music is a hit. I haven't got anything on it, we don't have any song attached to it. So what are we gonna do about that? You've got three hours to come up with something'." Subsequently, Cooper went through her catalogue of unused tracks that she had written over the last two or three years and sang the chorus of every single song against Higgins' piece of drumming. Three hours later, she sang the lyrics "round round baby round round" to Higgins, who said "that's it, that's amazing."

== Chart performance ==
"Round Round" debuted at number one on the UK Singles Chart and remained at the top spot for a week, giving the Sugababes their second consecutive UK number one single following "Freak like Me". The song was eventually certified gold by the British Phonographic Industry (BPI) denoting units of 400,000 sales and streams, and as of August 2020, the song had sold 277,000 pure copies in the UK. "Round Round" was also a success worldwide, reaching number two in Ireland, the Netherlands and New Zealand. The song also reached number three in Denmark and number four in Norway, Romania, and Switzerland. In Australia, "Round Round" debuted at number 21 and rose to a peak of number 13, giving the group their first Australian top-20 hit. It was certified Gold by the Australian Recording Industry Association (ARIA), making it the Sugababes' best-selling Australian single up until the release of their 2005 single "Push the Button", which reached number three and was certified Platinum.

== Music video ==
The Sugababes featured as a band performing on a rotating platform in the video for "Round Round".

The music video for "Round Round" was directed by Phil Griffin. It has the group performing on a rotating platform, while being surrounded by a tornado with dust and rubble accumulating in it. There is a rusty caged wall with an audience watching, a pair of sunglasses and a ring get sucked into the tornado from them. When Heidi's verse comes up, everything moves in slow-motion, including the tornado, before speeding up again. The girls slowly walk around three male dancers in the middle, and for the end chorus it appears the tornado has dissipated.

== Cover versions ==
The song was covered by Hong Kong singer Emme Wong in Cantonese in 2003. It was Wong's first single after her record label Universal Music modified her image for a sexier direction. The song quickly became a hit, due to its sexually explicit lyrics and dance moves, as well as the TV-banned video. The song reached the top of several music charts across Southeast China. In the year end, it won a number of awards, including "Best Covered Song", "Best Dance Record", and "Best Stage Performance".

== Track listings ==
UK CD1 and Japanese CD single
No.	Title	Writer(s)	Producer(s)	Length
1.	"Round Round" (album version)	Various: Keisha Buchanan; Mutya Buena; Nick Coler; Miranda Cooper; Lisa Cowling; Brian Higgins; Tim Powell; Heidi Range; Florian Pflueger; Felix Stecher; Robin Hofmann; Rino Spadavecchia	Kevin Bacon; Jonathan Quarmby; Wheatley^{[a]}; Brian Higgins^{[b]}	3:59
2.	"Groove Is Going On"	John Themis; Buchanan; Buena	Themis	4:04
3.	"Freak like Me" (Girls on Top dancehall mix)	Eugene Hanes; Marc Valentine; Loren Hill; William Collins; George Clinton; Gary Numan	Richard X	3:30

UK CD2
No.	Title	Writer(s)	Producer(s)	Length
1.	"Round Round" (album version)	Various: Buchanan; Buena; Coler; Cooper; Cowling; Higgins; Powell; Range; Pflueger; Stecher; Hofmann; Spadavecchia	Bacon; Quarmby; Wheatley^{[a]}; Higgins^{[b]}	3:55
2.	"Round Round" (Craigie & Crichton remix)	Various: Buchanan; Buena; Coler; Cooper; Cowling; Higgins; Powell; Range; Pflueger; Stecher; Hofmann; Spadavecchia	Bacon; Quarmby; Wheatley^{[a]}; Higgins^{[b]}; Stuart Crichton^{[a]}; Craigie Dodds^{[a]}	4:59
3.	"Round Round" (Soulwax remix)	Various: Buchanan; Buena; Coler; Cooper; Cowling; Higgins; Powell; Range; Pflueger; Stecher; Hofmann; Spadavecchia	Bacon; Quarmby; Wheatley^{[a]}; Higgins^{[b]}; Soulwax^{[a]}	4:11
4.	"Round Round" (Seani B. remix featuring Zaguzaar)	Various: Buchanan; Buena; Coler; Cooper; Cowling; Higgins; Powell; Range; Pflueger; Stecher; Hofmann; Spadavecchia	Bacon; Quarmby; Wheatley^{[a]}; Higgins^{[b]}; Seani B^{[a]}; Foots^{[a]}	4:25

UK cassette single
No.	Title	Writer(s)	Producer(s)	Length
1.	"Round Round" (album version)	Various: Buchanan; Buena; Coler; Cooper; Cowling; Higgins; Powell; Range; Pflueger; Stecher; Hofmann; Spadavecchia	Bacon; Quarmby; Wheatley^{[a]}; Higgins^{[b]}	3:59
2.	"Groove Is Going On"	Themis; Buchanan; Buena	Themis	4:04
3.	"Round Round" (Craigie & Crichton remix)	Various: Buchanan; Buena; Coler; Cooper; Cowling; Higgins; Powell; Range; Pflueger; Stecher; Hofmann; Spadavecchia	Bacon; Quarmby; Wheatley^{[a]}; Higgins^{[b]}; Crichton^{[a]}; Dodds^{[a]}	4:59

European CD single
No.	Title	Writer(s)	Producer(s)	Length
1.	"Round Round" (album version)	Various: Buchanan; Buena; Coler; Cooper; Cowling; Higgins; Powell; Range; Pflueger; Stecher; Hofmann; Spadavecchia	Bacon; Quarmby; Wheatley^{[a]}; Higgins^{[b]}	3:59
2.	"Groove Is Going On"	Themis; Buchanan; Buena	Themis	4:04

Australian CD single
No.	Title	Writer(s)	Producer(s)	Length
1.	"Round Round" (album version)	Various: Buchanan; Buena; Coler; Cooper; Cowling; Higgins; Powell; Range; Pflueger; Stecher; Hofmann; Spadavecchia	Bacon; Quarmby; Wheatley^{[a]}; Higgins^{[b]}	3:59
2.	"Round Round" (Craigie & Crichton remix)	Various: Buchanan; Buena; Coler; Cooper; Cowling; Higgins; Powell; Range; Pflueger; Stecher; Hofmann; Spadavecchia	Bacon; Quarmby; Wheatley^{[a]}; Higgins^{[b]}; Crichton^{[a]}; Dodds^{[a]}	4:59
3.	"Round Round" (Soulwax remix)	Various: Buchanan; Buena; Coler; Cooper; Cowling; Higgins; Powell; Range; Pflueger; Stecher; Hofmann; Spadavecchia	Bacon; Quarmby; Wheatley^{[a]}; Higgins^{[b]}; Soulwax^{[a]}	4:11
4.	"Freak Like Me" (Girls on Top dancehall mix)	Hanes; Valentine; Hill; Collins; Clinton; Numan	Richard X	3:28
5.	"Groove Is Going On"	Themis; Buchanan; Buena	Themis	4:04

Notes

- ^{^a} denotes additional producer(s)
- ^{^b} denotes original producer(s)

== Personnel ==
Personnel are adapted from the liner notes of Angels with Dirty Faces.

- Brian Higgins – writing
- Miranda Cooper – writing
- Lisa Cowling – writing
- Tim Powell – writing
- Nick Coler – writing
- Keisha Buchanan – writing
- Mutya Buena – writing
- Heidi Range – writing
- Florian Pflueger – writing
- Felix Stecher – writing
- Robin Hofmann – writing
- Rino Spadavecchia – writing
- Kevin Bacon – production
- Brian Higgins – original production
- Yoad Nevo – guitar, programming
- Tim Powell – original production
- Jonathan Quarmby – production
- Jeremy Wheatley – additional production, mixing

== Charts ==
=== Weekly charts ===
Chart (2002–2003)	Peak position
Australia (ARIA)	13
Austria (Ö3 Austria Top 40)	8
Belgium (Ultratip Bubbling Under Wallonia)	3
Belgium (Ultratop 50 Flanders)	16
Croatia International Airplay (HRT) (Note: Only a partial archive of the Croatian charts is available so it is possible that the single had a higher peak.)	6
Czech Republic (IFPI)	17
Denmark (Tracklisten)	3
Europe (Eurochart Hot 100)	9
France (SNEP)	71
Germany (GfK)	15
Greece (IFPI)	6
Hungary (Rádiós Top 40)	10
Hungary (Single Top 40)	17
Ireland (IRMA)	2
Italy (FIMI)	7
Netherlands (Dutch Top 40)	2
Netherlands (Single Top 100)	8
New Zealand (Recorded Music NZ)	2
Norway (VG-lista)	4
Poland Airplay (Music & Media)	15
Romania (Romanian Top 100)	4
Scottish Singles Sales (Official Charts)	1
Sweden (Sverigetopplistan)	11
Switzerland (Schweizer Hitparade)	4
UK Singles (Official Charts)	1
UK Airplay (Music Week)	1
US Dance Singles Sales (Billboard)	7

=== Year-end charts ===
Chart (2002)	Position
Australia (ARIA)	95
Belgium (Ultratop 50 Flanders)	82
Europe (Eurochart Hot 100)	58
Ireland (IRMA)	25
Italy (FIMI)	37
Netherlands (Dutch Top 40)	34
Netherlands (Single Top 100)	67
New Zealand (RIANZ)	44
Switzerland (Schweizer Hitparade)	58
UK Singles (OCC)	31
UK Airplay (Music Week)	9

Chart (2003)	Position
Australia (ARIA)	85

== Certifications and sales ==
Region	Certification	Certified units/sales
Australia (ARIA)	Gold	35,000^{^}
New Zealand (RMNZ)	Gold	7,500^{*}
United Kingdom (BPI)	Gold	499,000
^{*} Sales figures based on certification alone.^{^} Shipments figures based on certification alone.

== Release history ==
Region	Date	Format(s)	Label(s)	Ref(s).
United Kingdom	12 August 2002	CD; cassette	Island	
United States	16 September 2002	Contemporary hit; rhythmic contemporary radio	Universal	
Australia	4 November 2002	CD	Island	
Japan	19 February 2003	CD	Island	
