= Angels with Dirty Faces (Sugababes song) =

2002 single by Sugababes

Single by Sugababes

from the album Angels with Dirty Faces
- A-side: "Stronger"
- Released: 11 November 2002
- Genre: Dance-pop; R&B
- Length: 3:49
- Label: Island; Cartoon Network
- Songwriters: Brian Higgins; Bob Bradley; Tim Powell; Matthew Del Gray; Keisha Buchanan; Mutya Buena; Heidi Range
- Producers: Brian Higgins; Bob Bradley; Tim Powell; Gifford Noel

Sugababes singles chronology
"Round Round" (2002)	"Stronger" / "Angels with Dirty Faces" (2002)	"Shape" (2003)

Music video
- "Angels with Dirty Faces" on YouTube

"Angels with Dirty Faces" is a song by British girl group Sugababes from their second studio album of the same name. It was written by the Sugababes in collaboration with the Xenomania members Brian Higgins, Bob Bradley, Tim Powell and Matthew Del Gray. Higgins, Bradley, Powell and Gifford Noel produced the song. An uptempo pop and R&B record with dance influences, it was released on 11 November 2002 as a double A-side with "Stronger", as the album's third single. The song received generally favourable reviews from critics, who praised its composition and highlighted it as one of the album's better tracks.

Upon release as a double A-side, the song peaked at number seven on the UK Singles Chart and inside the top forty on the Australian and New Zealand charts. "Angels with Dirty Faces" was heavily promoted through Cartoon Network's animated television series The Powerpuff Girls. Merchandise was created to promote the release of the theatrical film based on the series, while Cartoon Network Studios produced the song's music video, a reworking of the episode "Nano of the North" from the original series' fourth season. The Sugababes performed the song at London's Scala, and Liverpool's Royal Court Theatre and King's Dock.

== Development and composition ==
"Angels with Dirty Faces" is the title track of the Sugababes' second studio album. The group began working on the album soon after the departure of original member Siobhán Donaghy, who was replaced by former Atomic Kitten member Heidi Range in September 2001. Within seven months, they composed forty tracks for the album, ten of which made the final cut. "Angels with Dirty Faces" was written by the Sugababes in collaboration with members of the British songwriting and production team Xenomania, including Brian Higgins, Bob Bradley, Tim Powell and Matthew Del Gray. Higgins, Bradley, Powell and Gifford Noel produced the song.

"Angels with Dirty Faces" is an uptempo fusion of pop and R&B. It is backed by a dance beat and contains elements of hip hop. According to the digital sheet music published by EMI Music Publishing, the song was composed in common time at a tempo of 110 beats per minute. "Angels with Dirty Faces" features a girl power theme, and according to the Sugababes, is about being naughty. Phil Udell from Hot Press magazine compared the song to American girl group Destiny Child's music, specifically their 2001 single "Bootylicious".

== Release and reception ==
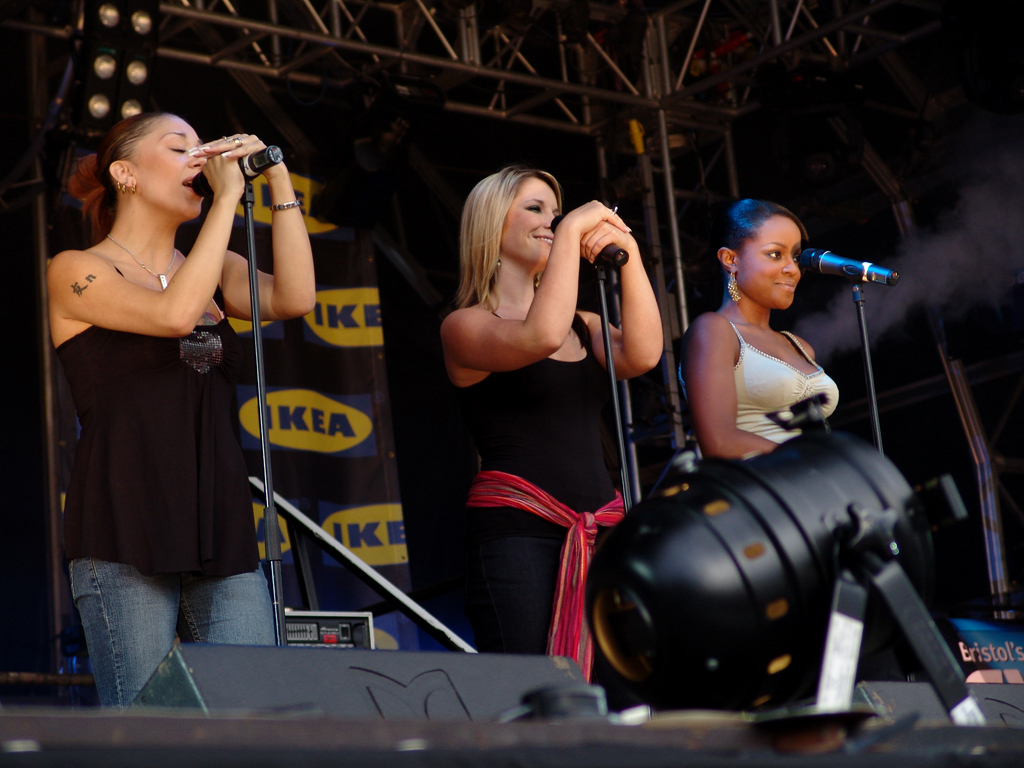
"Angels with Dirty Faces" is one of forty tracks that the Sugbabes wrote for their second album.

"Angels with Dirty Faces" was released as the album's third single as part of a double A-side with "Stronger". The double A-side was made available as a CD single, cassette tape and 12-inch single on 11 November 2002. An Audio Drive remix of the song appears on the 12-inch and CD releases, the latter of which features the music video. According to Julie Macaskill of Daily Record, the version which appears on the single release is "grittier" compared to the album version.

=== Critical response ===
The song received generally positive reviews from critics. NME critic Barry Nicholson suggested it was the better track from the double A-side and commended its "sleek garage sexiness". He additionally praised the song as smooth and tantalising. A critic from the Daily Mirror described "Angels with Dirty Faces", as well as the album track "Virgin Sexy", as "alive with wry palpitations". Julie Macaskill of Daily Record commended the song's pop and R&B mixture, which she noted as "proof that there is nothing sweeter than the Sugababes". Phil Udell from Hot Press admitted that although it is reminiscent of Destiny's Child's music, the song "lacks the American's sense of style". The Village Voice's Jess Harvell criticised "Angels with Dirty Faces" as "generic in the post-swingbeat sense".

=== Commercial performance ===
"Angels with Dirty Faces" appeared on singles charts as part of its double A-side release with "Stronger". In the 23 November 2002 issue of the UK Singles Chart, the single debuted and peaked at number seven, granting the band their third consecutive top ten hit from the album. It appeared in the chart for thirteen weeks, and by April 2010, sold 125,000 copies in the UK, placing it twelfth on the group's best-selling songs list. "Stronger" peaked atop the UK Airplay Chart on 7 December 2002, while "Angels with Dirty Faces" did not reach the top 200, instead becoming a club hit. The double A-side peaked at number thirty-four on the Australian Singles Chart, where it charted for nine weeks. On the New Zealand Singles Chart, it debuted on 23 February 2003 at number forty-three and peaked at number twenty-four sixteen weeks later. The single spent a total of eighteen weeks on the chart, and gave the Sugababes their third consecutive top forty hit in the country.

== Promotion ==
=== Products ===
The Sugababes' record label, Universal Island, heavily promoted "Angels with Dirty Faces" through Cartoon Network's animated television series The Powerpuff Girls, and its 2002 film of the same name. 250,000 posters which feature the Sugababes and the Powerpuff Girls were distributed throughout cinemas, while an additional 500,000 posters were delivered to stores of the supermarket chain Asda. In total, Universal Island obtained the equivalent of an estimated £1.5 million worth of media coverage. The label's stint with the series resulted in an animated music video for the song, produced by Cartoon Network Studios. It was played before all screenings of the film during its cinema release as a support feature. The video was also included on the PlayStation 2 video game The Powerpuff Girls: Relish Rampage. The Sugababes' cartoon characters from the video were featured on the desktops of custom computers that were promoted by the group.

=== Music video ===
The video channels "Nano of the North", an episode from the fourth season of The Powerpuff Girls, in which each Sugababes member portrays a Powerpuff Girl. The video opens with a clip of Professor Utonium driving in his car. Meanwhile, a dark cloud hovers over Townsville and it soon begins to rain and dissolves the town. When Professor Utonium arrives home, the Powerpuff Girls are shown watching the Sugababes on television, although the clip is interrupted with a News Flash that reads "Robot Rain Terrorises Townsville". Professor Utonium manages to retrieve the Sugababes and infuses them with Chemical X. He shrinks them to a microscopic size, places them in a glass jar and drives off in the car with them. He exits the car but trips over, causing the jar to drop and break. The Sugababes, playing the roles of The Powerpuff Girls, fight off the Nanobots with their superpowers. However, a gigantic Nanobot soon appears, and subsequently defeats the Sugababes through superior strength. Professor Utonium witnesses the incident and crushes the Nanobot with his foot. The rain subsequently stops and the sun appears, in which the people of the town start to celebrate. The video concludes with the Powerpuff Girls again shown watching the Sugababes on television, after which the Sugababes are shown on the show's episode ending shot.

When the Sugababes were questioned about their reaction to the video and its animation, group member Keisha Buchanan responded: "It was so funny seeing us like that and the Powerpuff Girls cartoon itself. The video so much resembled our personalities with these three characters so it was very funny to watch actually."

=== Live performances ===
The Sugababes performed "Angels with Dirty Faces" at the Scala in London on 11 November 2002. The Guardian's Betty Clarke described the group's vocals during the performance as "clean and pristine", and noted the presence of change in the group's sound and image. The band performed it at the Royal Court Theatre, Liverpool on 27 March 2003 as the first show of their UK tour. It was the opening song of the show, which contained a crowd of one thousand people. "Angels with Dirty Faces" was also the first song they performed during their eighty-minute set on 11 July 2003 at the King's Dock, Port of Liverpool, as part of the Liverpool Summer Pops music festival.

== Track listings and formats ==
- CD1 single
1. "Stronger" (New Single Version)
2. "Angels with Dirty Faces" (Audio Drive Remix)
3. "Stronger" (Almighty Club Mix)
4. "Stronger" (Video)
- CD2 single
1. "Angels with Dirty Faces" (Album Version)
2. "Stronger" (Antoine909 Remix)
3. "Stronger" (Live Remix at Leeds University, 5 October 2002)
4. "Angels with Dirty Faces" (Video)
- Cassette tape
1. "Stronger" (New Single Version)
2. "Angels with Dirty Faces" (Album Version)
3. "Stronger" (Almighty Club Mix)
- 12-inch single
1. "Stronger" (Almighty Club Mix)
2. "Stronger" (Antoine909 Remix)
3. "Angels with Dirty Faces" (Audio Drive Remix)

== Charts ==
All entries charted as part of the double A-side release with "Stronger".

=== Weekly charts ===
Weekly chart performance for "Angels with Dirty Faces"
Chart (2002–2003)	Peak position
Australia (ARIA)	34
Europe (Eurochart Hot 100)	28
New Zealand (Recorded Music NZ)	24
Scottish Singles Sales (Official Charts)	8
UK Singles (Official Charts)	7

=== Year-end charts ===
Year-end chart performance for "Angels with Dirty Faces"
Chart (2002)	Position
UK Singles (OCC)	118
