= Are "Friends" Electric? =

1979 single by Tubeway Army

"Are 'Friends' Electric?"

Single by Tubeway Army

from the album Replicas
- B-side: "We Are So Fragile"
- Released: 4 May 1979
- Recorded: January–February 1979
- Studio: Gooseberry Sound Studios (London, England)
- Genre: Synth-pop
- Length: 5:25 (Album and commercial 7" version); 3:45 (Promo 7" version)
- Label: Beggars Banquet (BEG 18)
- Songwriter: Gary Numan
- Producer: Gary Numan

Tubeway Army singles chronology
"Down in the Park" (1979)	"Are 'Friends' Electric?" (1979)

"Are 'Friends' Electric?" is a 1979 song by the English new wave band Tubeway Army. Taken from their album Replicas, it was released as a single in May 1979 and reached number one in the UK Singles Chart, staying there for four weeks. It was written and produced by Gary Numan, the band's frontman and lead vocalist. It was also the band's last single before breaking up.

== Music and production ==
"Are 'Friends' Electric?" was originally written on an old out-of-tune pub piano. It was initially two different songs that were combined. Numan recorded it on a Polymoog synthesizer with conventional bass and drums.

The song features three different sections: a recurring verse with a synth riff in C and B flat, a recurring section with spoken word over slow arpeggiated seventh chords, and an instrumental break in F. The instrumentation is quite minimal: a conventional drum and bass guitar backing track, some additional heavily flanged guitar (particularly in the instrumental break), subdued vocals and, most prominently, Minimoog and Polymoog synthesisers. These synth parts include portamento background lines.

Numan stumbled upon synthesisers by accident. While intending to record a punk album, he noticed a Minimoog synthesiser that had been left in the studio.

In a 2014 interview with The Guardian, Numan commented on the song's lyrics:

All my early songs were about being alone or misunderstood. As a teenager, I'd been sent to a child psychiatrist and put on medication. I had Asperger's and saw the world differently. I immersed myself in sci-fi writers: Philip K Dick, JG Ballard. The lyrics came from short stories I'd written about what London would be like in 30 years. These machines – "friends" – come to the door. They supply services of various kinds, but your neighbours never know what they really are since they look human. The one in the song is a prostitute, hence the inverted commas. It was released in May 1979 and sold a million copies. I had a No 1 single with a song about a robot prostitute and no one knew.

== Release ==
"Are 'Friends' Electric?" was released as a limited-edition picture disc of 20,000 copies in May 1979. The B-side of the single was a more rock-oriented number, "We Are So Fragile", which was performed on Numan's 1979 "Touring Principle" series of concerts and appears on the album Living Ornaments '79.

The single entered the lower reaches of the UK Singles Chart at a modest No. 71, steadily climbing to No. 1 at the end of June and remaining at that position for four consecutive weeks.

== Reception ==
Despite being over five minutes long and possessing, in the words of its composer, "no recognisable hook-line whatsoever", the single topped the UK charts in mid-1979. Whilst the track's distinctive sound stood out at the time, sales also benefited from the record company's use of a picture disc and Numan's striking, "robotic" performance on the TV shows The Old Grey Whistle Test and Top of the Pops.

Writing for Smash Hits in 1979, Cliff White described the song as "a dark, threatening wall of synthesised sound" which "throbbed ominously behind a gloomy song of paranoia and loneliness". White went on to say it was "gripping stuff, but cheerful it isn't".

The song has retrospectively been described as "an atmospheric, almost frigid-sounding monologue spliced over creepy after-dark synthesizers" that "had not a hook or chorus in sight".

== Live versions ==
"Are 'Friends' Electric?" has been a mainstay of Numan's concerts since its release and appears on all ten of his official live recordings to date. A semi-acoustic version appeared on the 2006 Jagged tour set list.

== Track listing ==
All tracks are written by Gary Numan.

No.	Title	Length
1.	"Are 'Friends' Electric?"	5:18
2.	"We Are So Fragile"	2:46

== Personnel ==
Tubeway Army

- Gary Numan – Minimoog and Polymoog synthesizers, guitar, vocals
- Paul Gardiner – bass guitar
- Jess Lidyard – drums

Production

- Gary Numan – production

== Charts ==
=== Weekly charts ===
Chart (1979)	Peak position
Australia (Kent Music Report)	12
Austria (Ö3 Austria Top 40)	12
Belgium (Ultratop 50 Flanders)	21
Ireland (IRMA)	3
Netherlands (Dutch Top 40)	9
Netherlands (Single Top 100)	9
New Zealand (Recorded Music NZ)	8
UK Singles (Official Charts)	1
US Bubbling Under Hot 100 Singles (Billboard)	5
West Germany (GfK)	23

=== Year-end charts ===
Chart (1979)	Position
Australia (Kent Music Report)	85
Netherlands (Dutch Top 40)	86
UK Singles (OCC)	7

== Certifications ==
Region	Certification	Certified units/sales
United Kingdom (BPI)	Gold	500,000^{^}
^{^} Shipments figures based on certification alone.

== Cover versions and sampling ==
The song was sampled by Richard X in a song titled "We Don't Give a Damn About Our Friends" as a mashup with vocals from Adina Howard's "Freak like Me", which the Sugababes then recorded under the latter title and achieved a number one UK hit in 2002. Numan considered this cover to be better than his original.
