= Siobhán Donaghy discography =

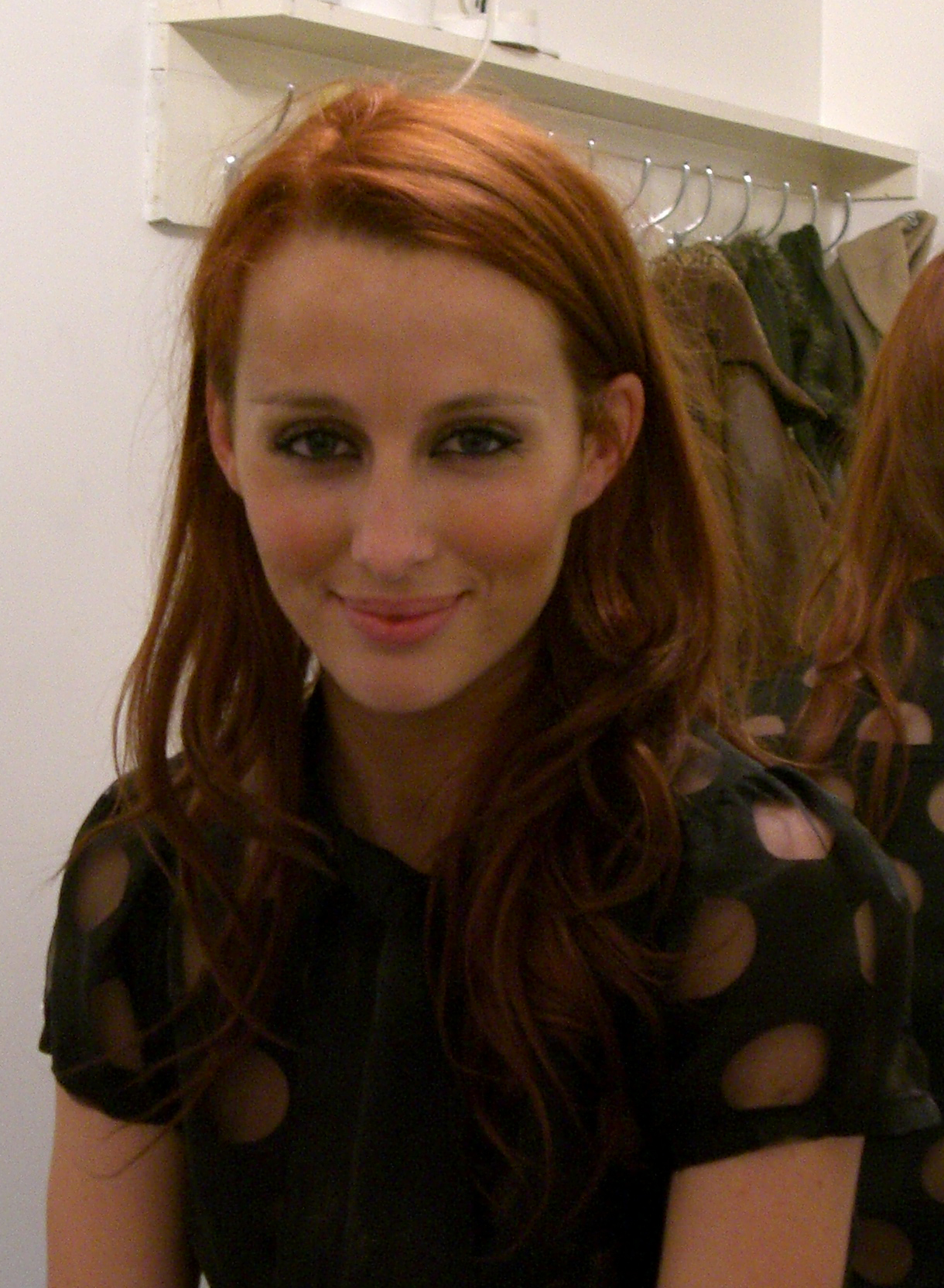
- Studio albums: 2
- Singles: 6
- Music videos: 4
- Featured singles: 1

The discography of British singer Siobhán Donaghy consists of two studio albums, six singles (including one as a featured artist) and four music videos.

Donaghy first rose to fame as a member of the Sugababes, and released four top forty singles with the group; "Overload", "New Year", "Run for Cover" and "Soul Sound". However she left the group after the release of their debut album One Touch.

In March 2003, Donaghy released the 7-inch vinyl single "Nothing but Song" under the alias of "Shanghai Nobody" as she did not want to be known as "the girl who left the Sugababes". For the release of her first commercial single in June 2003, "Overrated" (co-written with McVey and Paul Simm), Donaghy reverted to her given name. "Overrated" peaked at No. 19 in the UK. It was followed by the single "Twist of Fate", which was released in September 2003 and charted at No.52.

Donaghy's debut album Revolution in Me was released by London Records in September 2003, and entered the UK Albums Chart at No. 117. She was dropped by London Records following poor albums sales and musical differences.

In 2005, Donaghy appeared as a backing vocalist on the Mattafix album Signs of a Struggle and on the Morcheeba album The Antidote.

She recorded a second album independently which was picked up by Parlophone, part of the EMI group, which also bought the rights to Revolution in Me. The album's title track, "Ghosts", was released in February 2007 as a 12-inch promotional two-track single with the song "Don't Give It Up". The latter song was given a wider release in April 2007 and peaked at No.45 in the UK. The second single, "So You Say", was released in June 2007 and peaked at No.76. A remix of "Don't Give It Up" by Jerry Bouthier is featured on the Kitsuné release BoomBox, released in November 2007.

The album, Ghosts, was also released in June 2007 and peaked at No.92. Donaghy had said of the release that she wanted commercial success only so that she could continue to make music. She told The London Paper: "I make left field pop music, and it's a difficult genre to be in because it's not straight pop, it's not alternative, and it's quite hard to market. You have to push it and work it.".

In June 2009, Donaghy was featured on the Square1 single "Styfling" produced by Silvio Pacini. Later in the year, she said in an interview with fashion site ponystep.com that she feels she had "had the break" she wanted from the industry and was currently working on new music but was unsure when it will be finished.

== Studio albums ==
List of albums, with selected chart positions, sales, and certifications
Title	Album details	Peak chart positions	Sales and certifications
Title	Album details	UK	Sales and certifications
Revolution in Me	Released: 29 September 2003; Label: London Records; Format: CD, digital download	117	
Ghosts	Released: 25 June 2007; Label: Parlophone; Format: CD, digital download	92	

== Singles ==
Year	Song	Chart peak positions				Album
Year	Song	UK	IRE	NED	EU	Album
2003	"Overrated"	19	33	75	86	Revolution in Me
2003	"Twist of Fate"	52	—	—	—	Revolution in Me
2007	"Don't Give It Up"	45	—	—	—	Ghosts
2007	"So You Say"	76	—	—	—	Ghosts
2023	"Pop Illusion"	—	—	—	—	Revolution in Me: 20th Anniversary

=== As a featured artist ===
Year	Song	Chart peak positions				Album
Year	Song	UK	IRE	NED	EU	Album
2009	"Styfling" (Square 1 featuring Siobhan Donaghy)	—	—	—	—	

== Music videos ==
Year	Song	Director(s)
2003	"Overrated"	Big TV!
2003	"Twist of Fate"	Nick Wood
2007	"Don't Give It Up"	Sophie Muller
2007	"So You Say"	Jamie Thraves
