= Overrated (disambiguation) =

Overrated may refer to:

- "Overrated", a 2003 single by English singer Siobhán Donaghy from her debut studio album Revolution in Me
- "Overrated", a 2012 song by English singer-songwriter Mika from his third studio album The Origin of Love
- "Overrated", a 2003 song by Canadian rock band Three Days Grace from their self-titled debut studio album
- "Overrated", a 2009 song by American singer Ashley Tisdale from her second studio album Guilty Pleasure
