= Don't Give It Up (Siobhán Donaghy song) =

Single by Siobhán Donaghy

from the album Ghosts
- B-side: "Givin' In"
- Released: 16 April 2007 (United Kingdom)
- Recorded: 2006
- Genre: Electropop, trip hop
- Length: 3:09
- Label: Parlophone
- Songwriters: Siobhán Donaghy; James Sanger
- Producer: James Sanger

Siobhán Donaghy singles chronology
"Twist of Fate" (2003)	"Don't Give It Up" (2007)	"So You Say" (2007)

"Don't Give It Up" is the lead single from English singer Siobhán Donaghy's second studio album, Ghosts. It was the first song to appear on her MySpace page, and was not originally intended as a single release. However, it was later confirmed for release as the album's lead single due to fan praise. Promotion for the single started in 2007, and the music video was added to YouTube on 25 January 2007. The single was released as a digital download on 9 April 2007 and released physically on 16 April 2007.

A remix of "Don't Give It Up" by Jerry Bouthier is featured on the Kitsuné release BoomBox, released in November 2007.

== Reception ==
The song has been received well by her fans, and was praised by former Sugababes member Mutya Buena, who commented that "it is very different from other music genres". The song was added to the BBC Radio 1 C playlist on 29 March 2007. The single peaked at number 45 in the United Kingdom, falling to number 79 in the second week. Popjustice reviewed the song, saying: "Siobhan has instead embraced pretty dresses and superior songs. Very wise. Even allowing for the video's more distracting moments - writhing around in said pretty dresses - this is a Massive Attack-style piece of complete brilliance."

== Music video ==
The music video for "Don't Give It Up" was directed by Sophie Muller, and was shot in various towns including Marrakesh, Essaouira, El Jadida, and parts were also shot in the French mountains. The video became available to music channels in late February.

== Track listing ==
- Digital download EP #1
1. "Don't Give It Up" - 3:08
2. "Givin' In" - 3:45
3. "Ghosts" (Album Mix) - 6:24
- Digital download EP #2
1. "Don't Give It Up" - 3:08
2. "Don't Give It Up" (Medicine 8 Dub) - 4:45
3. "Ghosts" (Album Mix) - 6:24
- Digital download EP #3
1. "Don't Give It Up" (Acoustic) - 3:38
2. "Don't Give It Up" (Hypnolove Dub Remix) - 5:09
3. "Don't Give It Up" (Medicine 8 Vox Remix) - 5:32
- CD single
1. "Don't Give It Up" - 3:08
2. "Givin' In" - 3:45
- 12" picture disc
1. "Don't Give It Up" - 3:08
2. "Don't Give It Up" (Medicine 8 Dub) - 4:45
- 12" vinyl #1
1. "Don't Give It Up" - 3:08
2. "Ghosts" (Album Mix) - 6:24
- 12" vinyl #2
1. "Don't Give It Up" (Medicine 8 Dub) - 4:45
2. "Don't Give It Up" (Hypnolove Dub Remix) - 5:09
3. "Don't Give It Up" (Medicine 8 Vox Remix) - 5:32
4. "Don't Give It Up" (Acapella) - 3:31

== Charts ==
Chart (2007)	Peak position
Scotland Singles (OCC)	31
UK Singles (OCC)	45
