= Luke Mornay =

French record producer, remixer, and songwriter

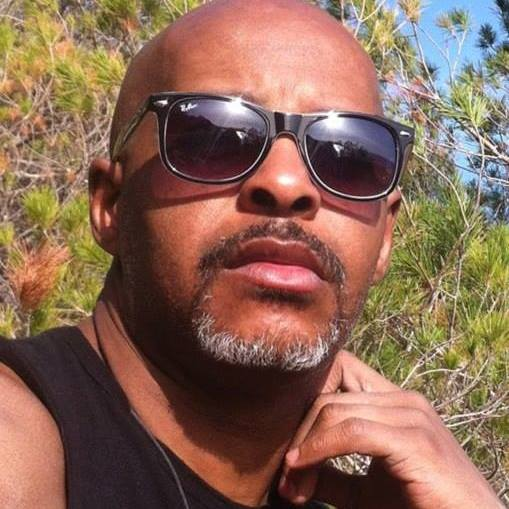
- Luke Mornay

Background information
- Also known as: Luke Mourinet, Fortun8 Fellaz, Shades of Mercy, Luke Surgeon
- Born: Luc Mourinet; Saint-Claude, Guadeloupe, France
- Genres: Pop, electronic, dance, house
- Occupations: Record producer, songwriter, remixer, mixing engineer, composer
- Years active: 1991–present
- Labels: Mornay Music, Southern Fried Records
- Website: www.lukemornay.com

Luke Mornay (born Luc Mourinet; also professionally credited as Luke Mourinet) is a French record producer, remixer, songwriter, mixing engineer and composer.

As one half of the production duo Ruff & Jam, Mornay co-produced the official United States version of Kylie Minogue's 2002 single "Love at First Sight", released by Capitol Records. The song reached number one on Billboard's Hot Dance Music/Club Play chart.

His production and remix credits include recordings by The Killers, Kim Wilde, Debbie Gibson, Boy George, Bananarama, Fine Young Cannibals, Sugababes, Scissor Sisters, Sophie Ellis-Bextor, Robbie Williams, Frou Frou, The Brand New Heavies and Rose Laurens.

He has also collaborated with Kevin Godley and James Atkin, and has released electronic music under the name Fortun8 Fellaz.

== Career ==
=== Early career (1991–2001) ===
Mornay began his career in France in the early 1990s, working in computer programming, DJing, songwriting and music production.

Through his connection with music executive Roland Kluger, he travelled to London and became involved with Pete Waterman Entertainment and PWL's Vineyard Studios, associated with the production team Stock Aitken Waterman. Mornay later published an account of his experiences during this period.

He relocated to Belgium in the early 1990s. In 1993, he met Belgian musician and producer Jean-Marie Moens, with whom he began writing and producing music. Their early work included projects involving Bla Bla Posse and Julie Hamilton.

The partnership developed into the production and remix duo Ruff & Jam, with Moens working under the name "Ruff" and Mourinet under the name "Jam".

Mornay discussed his early career, the PWL period and the formation of Ruff & Jam in a May 2005 interview conducted by Monica Rydel for the music industry publication HitQuarters.

=== Ruff & Jam (2002–2007) ===
In 2002, Ruff & Jam produced the official United States version of Kylie Minogue's "Love at First Sight", released by Capitol Records. Credited as the "Ruff & Jam US Mix", the recording was also included on a special edition of Minogue's album Fever.

The single reached number one on Billboard's Hot Dance Music/Club Play chart in July 2002. Ruff & Jam's contribution to the American release was subsequently documented in Billboard's October 2002 article "Ruff Love".

During production of the American version, the duo adapted elements of their recording to accommodate the song's existing music video, a process Mourinet later discussed in his 2005 HitQuarters interview.

"Love at First Sight" received a nomination for Best Dance Recording at the 45th Annual Grammy Awards in 2003.

Ruff & Jam subsequently worked on recordings by artists including The Killers, Robbie Williams, Scissor Sisters, Sugababes, Sophie Ellis-Bextor, Frou Frou, Mary J. Blige, Placebo, Amy Winehouse and Axelle Red.

In 2004, the duo released the single "Another Day (Can't Let Go)", featuring vocalist Nina Babet. Written by Mourinet and Moens, the single reached number 19 on the Belgian Ultratop chart.

In 2005, their remix of The Killers' "Smile Like You Mean It" reached number one on the UK Music Week Update Buzz Chart and was featured on Pete Tong's Essential Selection on BBC Radio 1.

The remix also received coverage in DMC Magazine.

Other Ruff & Jam productions included remixes associated with Helena Paparizou's "Mambo!" and Sugababes' "In the Middle".

Their remix of "Lark" by American electronic pop group Au Revoir Simone was featured by XLR8R and Stereogum.

In a 2007 interview published by music technology company Steinberg, Ruff & Jam discussed their production methods, studio techniques and collaborations with international recording artists.

=== Solo projects and production work (2008–2019) ===
Mornay also recorded under the name Fortun8 Fellaz, alternatively styled Fortune8Fellaz.

The project released the house music EP Look At Me House through Southern Fried Records, an independent electronic music label associated with Norman Cook. The release included original and extended versions alongside remixes by Danton Eeprom and Nathan Detroit.

Fortun8 Fellaz appeared on Southern Fried Records' official artist roster, as documented by an archived version of the label's website from August 2010.

"Look At Me House" appeared on the label's Southern Fried & Tested 2 compilation in 2009. The Nathan Detroit Tribute Mix was subsequently included on Southern Fried & Tested 3, while the Danton Eeprom remix appeared on DJ Emerson's 2009 compilation Boy Got Bass 3.

In 2011, Mornay, credited as Luke Mourinet, co-produced "More to Me" by the finalists of the Belgian television talent competition Idool 2011, alongside producer Hans Francken. The single reached number one on Belgium's Ultratop singles chart, remaining at the top for five consecutive weeks. It achieved gold status following sales exceeding 10,000 copies.

That year, Mornay also contributed to Geike Arnaert's solo album For the Beauty of Confusion.

He subsequently collaborated with James Atkin, lead vocalist of British band EMF, contributing production and mixing work to Atkin's solo recordings, including The Party Faithful (2017) and So10 (2024).

In 2017, Mornay contributed a newly commissioned remix of Debbie Gibson's 1987 single "Shake Your Love" to her career retrospective We Could Be Together. The remix was among the new recordings added to the 13-disc collection ahead of its release.

In December 2017, Gibson selected "Shake Your Love (Luke Mornay Remix)" among her ten favourite recordings from the collection in an article for Billboard. She discussed the remix's 1980s-inspired drum-machine sound, its arrangement and the response it had received from her fans.

=== Film and television ===
Mornay has worked as a composer and contributed to the music and sound departments of film and television productions.

For the television series All Wrong (2017–2018), he is credited under his birth name, Luc Mourinet, as a composer on nine episodes in 2017, alongside Jean-Luc Drion. He also received sound editing credits for nine episodes in 2018.

In 2019, Mourinet contributed additional music to Play or Die, a horror film directed by Jacques Kluger.

In 2020, he was credited as composer for Zeroday (A Macabre Stroll), a horror television miniseries directed by Jacques Kluger and produced by 20th Digital Studio.

=== Later career (2020–present) ===
In 2020, Mornay collaborated with Kevin Godley, formerly of 10cc, on "Expecting a Message", included on Godley's solo album Muscle Memory.

Mornay subsequently released the album Twenty Five Ten (2021), featuring collaborations with Godley and James Atkin. The album received a five-star review from New Sounds Magazine in February 2021.

In 2024, Mornay contributed four remixes to Love Blonde: The RAK Years 1981–1983, a four-CD retrospective of Kim Wilde's early recordings released by Cherry Red Records. The collection included his versions of "Kids in America", "Take Me Tonight", "Dancing in the Dark" and "House of Salome". The latter three were identified as exclusive new mixes in the collection's official track listing.

The release was also covered by music reissue publication SuperDeluxeEdition.

In a review of the collection, Daily Vault discussed Mornay's reinterpretation of "House of Salome", comparing its dance-oriented production to the sound of Dead or Alive.

Also in 2024, Mornay contributed a remix of Rose Laurens' hit "Africa" to a project revisiting the recording alongside versions by Superfunk and 7th Heaven. The release received coverage from French radio station Nostalgie.

He also remixed "Back to Love" for the 30th-anniversary edition of 'Brother Sister' by The Brand New Heavies.

In 2025, Mornay's remix of Fine Young Cannibals' "Don't Look Back" appeared on FYC40, a collection commemorating the band's 40th anniversary.

In October 2025, Mornay released a remix of Boy George's "The World Is Cool", issued by BGP Records. The recording, titled "The World Is Cool (Luke Mornay Remix Radio Edit)", was released on 17 October 2025.

In 2026, Mornay contributed "More Than Physical (Luke Mornay's Jet Set '26 Mix)" to the 40th-anniversary reissue of True Confessions by Bananarama, released by London Records on 28 August 2026. The expanded collection featured newly commissioned remixes by Mornay, Richard X, The Alias and other producers. His extended remix appeared on the double-vinyl edition, while an edited version was included on the deluxe three-CD edition.

Following its release, True Confessions reached number six on the UK Albums Chart, surpassing its original 1986 peak of number 46.

That year, Mornay worked on Belgian singer Ce'Loy's single "By Your Side", which debuted at number 87 on Belgium's Top Belge Tipik chart. The recording and chart entry were documented by Belgian public broadcaster RTBF.

Mornay also remixed Rose Laurens' "Musique métisse" for the 2026 compilation Remixes, released by Pulse Records. The collection included both extended and edited versions of his production.

== Other work ==
=== Reissues and archival releases ===
Mornay's production and remix work has appeared on expanded editions and archival releases by artists including Shakespears Sister, Ace of Base, Siobhan Donaghy, Dannii Minogue and Fine Young Cannibals.

These include material associated with Shakespears Sister's Hormonally Yours and Sacred Heart, Fine Young Cannibals' The Raw & the Cooked, Ace of Base's Beautiful Life: The Singles, Siobhan Donaghy's Revolution in Me and Dannii Minogue's Neon Nights.

=== Music technology ===
Mornay has worked with PreSonus on its Studio One digital audio workstation platform.

In 2015, he presented the international launch of Studio One 3 in English and French for the company's official video channels.

In February 2016, he appeared as a presenter at Musicfair Weekend in Utrecht, Netherlands, discussing music production workflows and the integration of DJ performance with live instrumentation.
