= Medicine 8 =

- Born: Liam May and Luke May
- Origin: London, England
- Genres: Acid House; Electro; House; Techno
- Years active: 1996–present
- Labels: Regal Recordings, Trashmouth Records
- Website: facebook.com/medicine8

Medicine 8 are a British electronic music duo composed of brothers Liam May and Luke May.

== Biography ==
The duo began DJing and producing in the mid-nineties under a variety of aliases, releasing music under their own imprint. Luke explained how they took on the Medicine 8 name in an interview with Scruff: “We started our own label in 1996 putting out twelve inches which was when everything really started, though that wasn't as Medicine 8. It just so happened that one of the 12”s people picked up on was Capital Rocka, for which we had just happened to use the name Medicine 8, so we stuck with it”.

They released their rock-fused electro debut album, IronStylings in 2002 on Regal Recordings to critical acclaim. The album spawned the singles Rock Music Pays Off and Capital Rocka. The latter of which had gained popularity in its own right after they gave a dub-plate to Carl Cox who played it at the Miami Music Winter Conference. It also featured the track Mystery Murdered which sampled The Velvet Underground's own Murder Mystery. Of this version, member Lou Reed commented: "One time, this band called Medicine 8 sent me a new version of a track that only a Velvet Underground aficionado would know existed. They did it so much better than I did and I love when that happens."

They have been regulars in Ibiza as well as at the Miami Winter Music Conference, and have appeared at many of the major UK dance festivals such as Glastonbury Festival, Creamfields and Homelands. They also held a residency at Pacha in Argentina and featured in a number of sessions on BBC Radio 1.

As remixers, they have re-worked tracks for Gus Gus, Kylie Minogue, Orbital, Manic Street Preachers, Nirvana, Tiga, X-Press2 and many others.

Now releasing music through their own label, Trashmouth Records, they began work on their second album in 2011. The year also took in live appearances that included the Cloud 9 Festival in Cheshire.

=== Releases ===
Title	Format	Label	Year
Oxygen Seeds	10-inch Single	Regal Recordings	2002
Rock Music Pays Off	CD,12-inch Single	Regal Recordings	2002
Capital Rocka	CD,12-inch Single	Regal Recordings	2002
IronStylings	CD, 2xLP, Album	Regal Recordings	2002
Kimchi45	12-inch Single	Regal Recordings	2003
DJ World Series: UK Flava House	CD	DJ Magazine	2003
Gimme What You've Got	12-inch Single	Regal Recordings	2005
The Flea (And Now It Sucks Me...)	12-inch Single	Regal Recordings	2006
Transmission One	12-inch Single	Regal Recordings	2007
This Is Electra Mite	MP3	Lot 49	2008
Mercury Injection (featuring Leticia La Bruja)/ Rock Music Pays Off (Hip-House Remix)	Double-A MP3	Trashmouth Records	2011
Cry Baby (with Kurtis Hardrive)/Cry Baby (Dub Mix)	MP3	Trashmouth Records	2012
My Kamera (with Tom Songs Color TV) (Vox Mix)/My Kamera (Dub Mix)	MP3	Trashmouth Records	2012
