= Twist of Fate (Siobhán Donaghy song) =

Single by Siobhán Donaghy

from the album Revolution in Me
- B-side: "Don't Know Why"; "I'm Glad You're Mine"
- Released: 15 September 2003 (United Kingdom)
- Genre: Pop rock
- Length: 3:46 (radio edit) 4:50 (album version)
- Label: London Records
- Songwriters: Siobhán Donaghy; Cameron McVey; Marlon Roudette; Matt Kent; Preetesh Hirji
- Producer: Cameron McVey

Siobhán Donaghy singles chronology
"Overrated" (2003)	"Twist of Fate" (2003)	"Don't Give It Up" (2007)

"Twist of Fate" was the second and final single to be released from former Sugababe Siobhán Donaghy's debut studio album, Revolution in Me. The song failed to reach the heights of previous single "Overrated", which made number 52 in the UK Singles Chart. This was her final single to be released with London Records, due to her departure from the record label.

== Track listing ==
- UK CD single #1
1. "Twist of Fate" (Radio Edit) - 3:48
2. "Don't Know Why" (Live) - 5:10
3. "Twist of Fate" (Video) - 3:48
- UK CD single #2
1. "Twist of Fate" (Album Version) - 4:50
2. "I'm Glad You're Mine" (Live) - 3:12
3. "Overrated" (Live at Glastonbury - Video) - 4:45
- Digital download and cassette
1. "Twist of Fate" (Radio Edit) - 3:48
2. "Don't Know Why" (Live) - 5:10

== Charts ==
Chart (2003)	Peak position
Scottish Singles Sales (Official Charts)	58
UK Singles (Official Charts)	52
