= Ghosts (Siobhán Donaghy album) =

Studio album by Siobhán Donaghy
- Released: 25 June 2007
- Recorded: 2005–2007
- Genre: Alternative pop
- Length: 42:31
- Label: Parlophone
- Producers: James Sanger; Marius de Vries

Siobhán Donaghy chronology
Revolution in Me (2003)	Ghosts (2007)

Singles from Ghosts
- 1. "Don't Give It Up" Released: 16 April 2007; 2. "So You Say" Released: 16 June 2007

Ghosts is the second studio album by British musician Siobhán Donaghy, released on 25 June 2007 by Parlophone. The album was produced by James Sanger and Marius de Vries, and was recorded over an eighteen month period at Sanger's studio in northern France. The standard edition contains no contributions from any of the songwriters or producers who collaborated with Donaghy on her debut album, 2001's Revolution in Me. She was reluctant to create a record continuing in that same musical direction, so recorded Ghosts with different collaborators in an effort to create a new sound.

Donaghy and Sanger's working relationship while recording was often fraught, due to their differing backgrounds and Sanger's issues with heroin addiction and mental health. Donaghy and numerous reviews said the songcraft and quality of production on Ghosts were enhanced by these experiences, as they resulted in a more emotive album. Its lyrics deal with themes of mental health, depression, lost love, independence, and survival. Musically, it is an alternative pop album with elements of blues, dance, and trip hop.

The album's artwork was created by Floria Sigismondi, and contains references to Miss Havisham and The Lady of Shalott. "Don't Give It Up" and "So You Say" preceded the album as commercial singles. Both songs performed moderately well on the UK and Scottish singles charts. The title track was also issued as a promotional single.

Despite positive reviews, Ghosts peaked at number 92 in the UK. CD versions of the album initially suffered from a manufacturing error, as they contained another artist's music. CDs containing the correct music were distributed several weeks after the album's release. Promotion was also impacted by a hostile takeover of Parlophone's parent company EMI. Two months after its release, Donaghy postponed a tour and abandoned promotion of the album to join the West End production of Rent Remixed.

== Background and production ==
Revolution in Me, Donaghy's debut solo album, was released by London Records in 2003. However, she departed the label soon after. The majority of the people she collaborated with to create Revolution in Me also left the label after its absorption into Warner Music Group. She instead began work on a follow-up independently, and sought new collaborators. The standard edition of Ghosts does not feature any of the songwriters and producers who worked on her debut. She said "as much as I adored my first record ... I didn't want to make a continuation of it. So I was after a fresh sound and I found a man with a vision."

Work on Ghosts began in 2005 with producer James Sanger. Recording took place over an eighteen month period, in Sanger's home studio at a 500 year old manor in northern France. The manor was isolated, and received no television or radio signals. Recording was often delayed by Donaghy's holidays and travelling. The two recorded five of the songs on Ghosts without Donaghy being signed to a record deal. She eventually signed with Parlophone, who then financed its completion.

"[T]here was never any consistency in the way we made music. Sometimes he'd get back at the end of the night and we'd work in the morning, or sometimes start in the evening and work through the night. It was a very frustrating way to work, but it did bring out some pretty intense emotions in me. You know, I was living in someone else's home and not really enjoying it, yet at the same time I was really pleased with the music we were making. I think Ghosts wouldn't be such an emotive record if it hadn't been made like that."

— Donaghy on her working relationship with Sanger, and how the album was recorded.

Donaghy and Sanger's working relationship was sometimes fraught. Tension initially developed as a result of their differing backgrounds, with Donaghy noting she was raised in a working class household while Sanger came from a wealthy one. However, she said his attitude made her want to prove herself even more. At one point during recording, Sanger said he hated all the work Donaghy had previously recorded, but she later found out this was a ploy to inspire her to "try something different with my voice. He wanted it to be perfect so we bloody laboured over [Ghosts]." Their working relationship was also impacted by Sanger's issues with mental health and addiction. His mother died prior to production, and he developed an addiction to heroin. He entered rehab twice during recording. She said there was no consistency in the way the album was recorded, saying work sessions took place in "frustrating" patterns.

Sanger has been sober since the completion of Ghosts, with Donaghy saying he has "completely changed his life now". She praised him for inspiring her to become a better musician. In spite of his addiction, Sanger used recording sessions to teach Donaghy how to play keyboard instruments and synthesizers such as the Nord Lead 3, Moog, Rhodes and Electribe. She said Sanger wanted to "teach me everything as we went along". She confirmed that despite the difficulties in recording Ghosts, she would work with Sanger again if she were to create another solo album. She said: "I love [Ghosts] so much and I think, at the end of the record, James and I were just going off in a slightly different, more intense direction. I think we'll go more that way for the next record."

== Composition and style ==
Musically, Ghosts was described by authors and journalists as an alternative pop, and pop album, with elements of dance, trip hop, and blues. Donaghy described it as "essentially a pop record, but a challenging one." She elaborated that Ghosts is "quite ethereal, very much looking back to old sixties records and there's some harpsichord on the record too. There's also a medieval side, and nods to stuff like Brian Eno and early Annie Lennox." Other influences include Kate Bush and Elizabeth Fraser of Cocteau Twins. She described Fraser as one of her favourite vocalists, and one of her biggest inspirations when recording vocals for the album.

Donaghy wanted Ghosts to be an emotive record. She sought to create an album that was "catchy and not too hard for people to get into", but also "interesting and challenging for myself as an artist." She desired to go further left-field and use instrumentation that was more abstract than her contemporaries. She wanted to balance the commercial interests of Parlophone and her own artistic expression by creating radio-friendly singles as well as songs that could never be singles. She described the latter as the "actual essence" of the album, saying the title track would never be played on radio. She derided people in the music industry who claim "you can't make left-field pop music and be commercial", describing that attitude as "bullshit. They always say that when there's nothing else out there like it. I remember what was on the radio when my career began and God, it's so diverse now in comparison. And it feels good to be a part of it."

The first half of the album is lighter than the second half, with Donaghy saying the record becomes more intense as it progresses. Digital Spy said Ghosts was imbued with the tension Donaghy and Sanger had when they were recording; that as the album progresses, Sanger's production becomes "ever more layered and portentous, while Donaghy's vocals become bigger, bolder and more audacious. The results are frequently inspired." Lyrically, Ghosts contains themes of lost love, independence and survival. Stylus Magazine said some of the lyrical content could be interpreted as coping with depression, specifically in the songs "Make It Right" and "Coming Up for Air".

=== Songs ===
The lyric of album opener "Don't Give It Up" references Sanger's time in rehab overcoming his addiction to heroin. Yahoo! Music noted similarities between the song and Peter Gabriel and Kate Bush's 1986 single "Don't Give Up", saying the two songs share similarities not just with their titles, but with their shared message of resilience and persevering against the odds. MusicOMH described it as a mix of Kate Bush and Björk, saying the initially minimal electronica song gradually expands to an "angelic" chorus. Stylus Magazine said "Don't Give It Up" and "So You Say" compliment one another, describing both songs as symphonic pop. Numerous reviews said "So You Say" contains a "colossal chorus". The lyric references Donaghy's first love, and is her only song examining a romantic relationship. So as to not write a "revengeful song", she changed the subject's name to Adam, a reference to the biblical first man.

The Scotsman praised Donaghy's vocal on "There's a Place", but Stylus Magazine negatively compared the track to a ballad created by her former band the Sugababes. Although they complimented the string arrangement, they said the song was unable to "escape the twinkling syrup." MusicOMH called the song "tuneless", saying it "meanders around an acoustic shuffle before being bludgeoned with strings to add a bit of weight, but comes over as a bit wet." Donaghy said "Sometimes" helped break up the intensity found on the rest of Ghosts by being one of its most pop-sounding songs. She wrote around fifty lines worth of lyrics for the track, but did not want to overcomplicate the song so only included around six lines. MusicOMH complimented its production and Oriental chorus, which they said turned it into a "naggingly addictive tune", as opposed to one of Kylie Minogue's midtempo disco-pop tracks. Yahoo! Music said it was reminiscent of the 1960s work of Burt Bacharach.

The lyric of "12 Bar Acid Blues" was inspired by a vacation Donaghy took with her friends to Thailand, where she and her friends had their passports seized and they had near-death experiences while taking part in jungle treks. BBC called the song a "cordial, comedic and uber-literal tale" that "all but obliterates any assumptions" a listener may have about Donaghy and the album. Their writer said that although the track was out of place with the tone of the rest of the record, it showed "a side to Donaghy and a buoyant sound that both deserve to be investigated further." The song is built around an acoustic guitar, beats and electronic instrumentation, and was compared by MusicOMH to the work of Nelly Furtado and Natalie Imbruglia. The Times called the song "intriguing", noting that "While it's not what Robert Johnson might think of as the blues, it is a song about tribulation, set to a strummed guitar. It's deftly done, and it works well."

"Make It Right" does not include an immediate chorus, so Donaghy said she had to be convinced by her manager and A&R representative to include it on the album. She considers the song a sibling to "So You Say", saying that on "So You Say" she is critical of her ex-boyfriend, but on "Make It Right" she instead sympathises with him and is critical of herself. "Coming Up for Air" is one of the last tracks recorded for Ghosts. She said the lyric may subconsciously refer to her "wanting to get the hell out of the studio". Digital Spy said the song contains a "skittish rhythm" reminiscent of Madonna's Ray of Light, while the BBC described it as "a spectacle of sharpness within a honeyed setting".

"Goldfish" was written by Donaghy and Sanger after a discussion the pair had where Donaghy said she felt uninspired. Sanger responded: "Why don't you write about goldfish or something?". It is Donaghy's favourite song on the album, and contains its most personal lyric, dealing with themes of failure, insecurity, and isolation. Donaghy originally intended for a choir to perform the extensive background vocals, but said this became unfeasible, as a choir would not be able to replicate her vocals due to the melody changes. Her vocal range on the track spans almost six octaves. Digital Spy called it the best song on the album, describing it as an "epic tale of mental anguish whose harmony-drenched final minutes manage to evoke all the sweeping grandeur of 'Unchained Melody'." The BBC described the song as a "trippy hymn with a captivating refrain", and said both "Coming Up for Air" and "Goldfish" were "testament to an expansive talent and a fascinating album."

Like "Goldfish", the lyric of "Medevac" was inspired by a conversation Donaghy had with Sanger, where he explained the military term medevac. The lyric deals with Sanger's heroin addiction, which Donaghy said was getting worse. She elaborated: "This song is basically saying this is the end of the line. You've got to choose. ... It was as serious as you've got to choose your life or the addiction. ... The first line I wrote was 'Help me out here, because I'm strung out', and I think he was quite shocked that I'd come out with something like that." Digital Spy said the song contains a chorus "the size of Mars and a breathtakingly ballsy vocal from Donaghy." The Scotsman also praised Donaghy's vocal, saying it shows her "swooping down the octaves". Musically, Neu! Magazine compared "Medevac" to a "hungover Kate Bush after a night out at a Muse gig."

"Halcyon Days" was inspired by the area in northern France where the album was recorded. Donaghy described Barneville-Carteret as "a bit of a Twilight Zone", where she initially felt isolated as a result of Sanger's home not receiving TV or radio signals. However, she said she later learned to appreciate the idyllic lifestyle, saying she would sit outside his converted barn studio during the summer and "wouldn't wish to be anywhere else, and we wanted to capture that on a song." Numerous reviews noted similarities to the work of Massive Attack, specifically their song "Teardrop". The Scotsman said "Halcyon Days" and the title track end Ghosts on a "mystical and vaguely Oriental note".

"Ghosts"
A 12-second sample of the song's first verse, followed by that same 12-seconds reversed. The song contains two complete set of lyrics, one when played forwards and another when played backwards.

Donaghy said "Ghosts" was the album's most difficult song to complete, saying she and Sanger built the backing track over a considerable period before any melody or lyric was composed. The backing track eventually developed to the point where they believed any lyric or melody would be insufficient. Donaghy wrote and sang three different sets of lyrics, but said none of them worked. Over the course of his experimentation, Sanger reversed Donaghy's vocals and processed them using the reverb effect. The backwards vocals were then played on top of the forwards backing track, which provided a new melody. Donaghy then sang new lyrics on top of the reversed lyrics. As a result, the song contains two complete set of lyrics: one set when played forwards, and another set when played backwards. AllMusic complimented the "backwards studio trickery", which they said was "both haunting and mesmerizing in equal measure", and called it the album's best track. Stylus Magazine also said it was the best song on the album, while NME said the "backwards vocals and eeriness ... sounds like the creepier bits of Kate Bush's Hounds of Love, as produced by Massive Attack."

== Release and promotion ==
"Don't Give It Up" was issued as a promotional single on 12" vinyl as a double A-side with the album's title track in February 2007. "Don't Give It Up" was released as the album's lead single on April 16. The song debuted at number 72 on the UK Singles Chart, before peaking at number 45 the following week. It also peaked at number 31 on the Scottish Singles Chart. "So You Say" was released on 16 June, and peaked at number 76 in the UK and number 29 in Scotland.

In reference to her performance on the UK Singles Chart, Donaghy said the album was more important to her, noting the lack of promotional opportunities in the UK for singles. She said MTV UK were more concerned with playing The Osbournes and Jackass reruns than music videos. When discussing the lack of airplay, she said she did not want to make a "throwaway pop record", saying that although this would have made her career more manageable, she would not do so at the expense of artistic expression. Donaghy complimented Parlophone in the face of industry uncertainty, saying they were doing "everything in their power" to promote the album but "you just can't make people let you come on their show. ... I think you've just got to try and make the best record of your career and then see what happens." She planned to tour in support of the album.

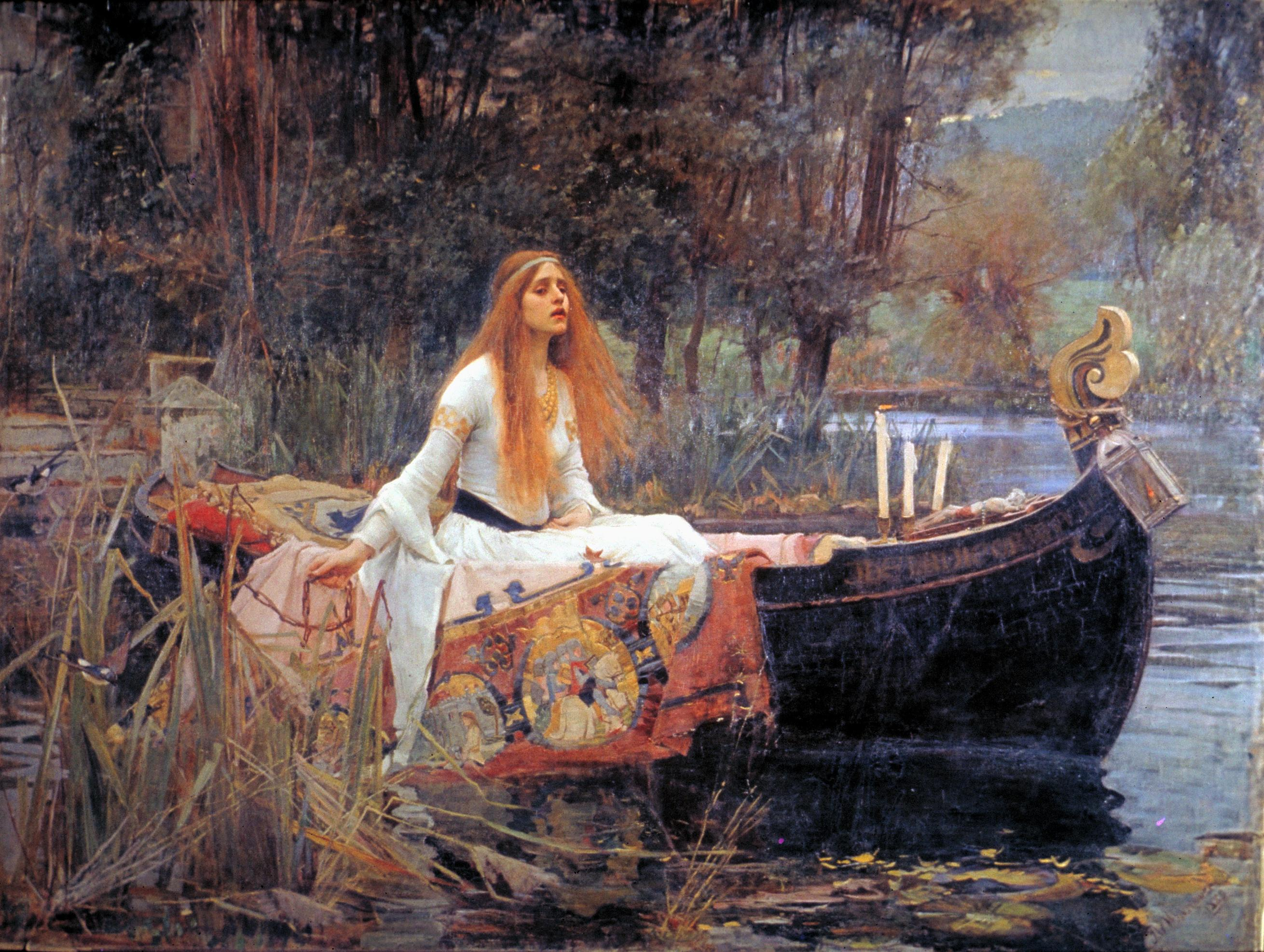
The album's artwork was influenced by The Lady of Shalott, illustrated here in John William Waterhouse's 1888 painting The Lady of Shalott.

The artwork for Ghosts was created by Floria Sigismondi. Donaghy and Sigismondi discussed concepts for the artwork for several months. Photoshoots took place in early 2007 in a disused theatre in Los Angeles, and required a crew of around 100 people. Yahoo! Music said the cover contains references to The Lady of Shalott and Miss Havisham.

Ghosts was released in the United Kingdom on 25 June, and peaked at number 92 on the UK Albums Chart. It was the subject of a manufacturing error upon release. Donaghy later confirmed: "When Ghosts came out, it didn't go on a new release shelf in any shop because it got delivered and there'd been a mistake on the production line. I've never heard the music that was on the CDs, but it wasn't my album. When the stores were told about it, the album was lifted off the shelves and taken back. By the time it was ready, a lot of the stores didn't take it back because they were pissed off."

Less than two months after the record was released, Donaghy announced she had joined the cast of Rent Remixed, a remixed version of Rent helmed by Kylie Minogue collaborators William Baker and Steve Anderson. The show ran in London's West End Duke of York's Theatre from October 2007, before closing the following February. Donaghy turned down work commitments related to Ghosts in order to join the production, including postponing a tour. In a 2025 Reddit Ask Me Anything, the album's producer James Sanger said its commercial performance was hampered by "bad timing". He said the release coincided with a hostile takeover of EMI by Guy Hands, which caused a "crisis of leadership in the whole EMI group of companies, including Parlophone Records."

== Critical reception ==
Professional ratings
Review scores
Source	Rating
AllMusic	4/5 stars
BBC	(favourable)
Digital Spy	5/5 stars
Marie Claire	4/5 stars
MusicOMH	3/5 stars
NME	7/10
Stylus Magazine	B−
The Scotsman	5/5 stars
The Times	4/5 stars
Yahoo! Music	7/10

AllMusic said Ghosts was more left-field than her debut, and called the record "accomplished and daring". They said it contained a precocious sense of maturity while comparing it to solo music released by other former girl-band members. They said although she was not the first to "ditch her pop roots in favour of something a little edgier", she had done so with the most conviction. The Scotsman listed it as the release of the week, praising Donaghy's vocals and saying the album was "as perfect as pop music gets in 2007". They said the record contained all the positive elements of girl band music while eliminating the filler. The Times praised Donaghy's vocals and lyricism, with Yahoo! Music also complimenting the quality of the lyrics.

Digital Spy said that in the context of the current pop climate, Ghosts was a "singularly unlikely triumph." Their writer elaborated: "Nobody else in 2007 is making records this bold, this big-hearted and this defiantly different." The BBC called it a work of art, saying it had a stronger sense of identity than its predecessor. They praised the songwriting and production in comparison to her debut, saying Ghosts displayed a "craftsmanship and an elegance to turn heads, win admirers and give Donaghy the spotlight she's long deserved." Their writer noted Donaghy had quit the Sugababes prior to their commercial breakthrough, and that Revolution in Me had "underachieved massively. But now is the time for [Donaghy] to shine, and if Ghosts can't help her do just that, we're all doomed." Similarly, NME called the album a "not insignificant triumph", saying it placed her in the position of being seen as the "insouciant, cut-glass-voiced heiress of eccentric English pop." Their writer went on to say: "If 2003's quickly forgotten debut Revolution In Me took tentative steps towards remaking Donaghy as a future pop saviour, Ghosts delivers on that promise." In a brief review, Marie Claire said Ghosts proved Donaghy was always the most talented member of the Sugababes.

Neu! Magazine rated the album 9 out of 10, calling it a "masterclass in brave but accessible left-field pop", saying it was likely one of the best pop albums of the year. Their writer summarised: "Though Ghosts is more likely to be a cult success than a chart smash, you get the impression Donaghy wouldn't mind either way. If she's making a record as accomplished and confident as Ghosts at just 22 years old, it's positively terrifying what she'll be conjuring up in five years time." In a more mixed review, MusicOMH said the record is an "accomplished step into solo artist territory", and an "accessible album full of smart sounds and personality". They said the songs contain lyrics one would "expect from a 22 year-old, full of emotional bruises, brush-offs and better days." However, they noted this lyrical content was in keeping with the Sugababes' 2000 single "Overload" and that song's "off-kilter originality." Nevertheless, the writer called the album's final three songs "something of a marvel". Although Stylus Magazine praised Donaghy's vocals and the songwriting, they said she would be better off "taking her eyes off the elusive spectre of popular success and stepping away from the demands and 'advice' of a major label, especially one as hapless as EMI [sub-label Parlophone]".

== Track listing ==
No.	Title	Writer(s)	Producer(s)	Length
1.	"Don't Give It Up"	Siobhán Donaghy; James Sanger	Sanger	3:12
2.	"So You Say"	Donaghy; Sanger	Sanger; Marius de Vries^{[a]}	4:19
3.	"There's a Place"	Donaghy; Sanger; Carl McIntosh	Sanger	3:25
4.	"Sometimes"	Donaghy; Sanger; Charles Lucy	Sanger	3:22
5.	"12 Bar Acid Blues"	Donaghy; Sanger; Ben Raynard	Sanger	3:55
6.	"Make It Right"	Donaghy; Sanger	Sanger	3:44
7.	"Coming Up for Air"	Donaghy; Jony Rockstar; Paul Hutton	de Vries	4:13
8.	"Goldfish"	Donaghy; Sanger	Sanger	4:09
9.	"Medevac"	Donaghy; Sanger	Sanger	3:58
10.	"Halcyon Days"	Donaghy; Sanger	Sanger	4:18
11.	"Ghosts"	Donaghy; Sanger; Alan Crosthwaite	Sanger	3:55

Ghosts – iTunes pre-order bonus tracks
No.	Title	Writer(s)	Producer(s)	Length
12.	"Man on a Mission"	Donaghy; Sanger	Sanger	3:54
13.	"Re-Offend"	Donaghy; Marlon Roudette; Preetesh Hirji	Roudette; Hirji	1:49

Notes

- ^{^[a]} signifies an additional producer

== Credits and personnel ==
Credits adapted from the album liner notes.

- Siobhán Donaghy – vocals, Nord Electro and paraphonic keyboards
- James Sanger – backing vocals, guitar, aeolian harp, EMS VCS 3, Roland 303, Moog Taurus, omnichord, programming, string arrangements on "So You Say" and "There's a Place", production on all tracks except "Coming Up for Air", mixing on "There's a Place" and "Ghosts"
- Jason Boshoff – programming and additional engineering on "So You Say", engineering on "Coming Up for Air"
- Sacha Collisson – guitar on "Make It Right"
- Alan Crosthwaite – bass and guitar on "Ghosts"
- Marius de Vries – production and mixing on "Coming Up for Air", additional production on "So You Say"
- Darren Evans – sleeve design
- Rob Haggett – technicial assistant for Ash Howes
- Ash Howes – bass on "Don't Give It Up", mixing on all tracks except "There's a Place", "Coming Up for Air" and "Ghosts"
- Hiro Ishizaka – technicial assistant for James Sanger
- Paul Jones – technicial assistant for James Sanger
- Charles Lucy – keyboards on "Sometimes"
- Carl McIntosh – guitar on "There's a Place"
- Vladiswar Nadishana – bansuri and "Dzuddahord" (guitar/sitar) on "Halcyon Days"
- Ben Ranyard – guitar on "12 Bar Acid Blues"
- Floria Sigismondi – photography
- Lee Slater – assistant engineering on "Coming Up for Air"
- David Treahearn – technicial assistant for Ash Howes
- Sam Wheat – technicial assistant for James Sanger

== Charts ==
Weekly chart performance for Ghosts
Chart (2007)	Peak position
UK Albums (Official Charts)	92
