= So You Say =

2007 single by Siobhán Donaghy

Single by Siobhán Donaghy

from the album Ghosts
- B-side: "Don't Take Me Back"
- Released: 16 June 2007
- Genre: Pop
- Length: 4:22
- Label: Parlophone
- Songwriters: Siobhán Donaghy; James Sanger
- Producers: Sanger; Marius de Vries (co-producer)

Siobhán Donaghy singles chronology
"Don't Give It Up" (2007)	"So You Say" (2007)	"Pop Illusion" (2023)

Music video
- "So You Say" on YouTube

"So You Say" is a song by British singer and songwriter Siobhán Donaghy. Written by Donaghy alongside producer James Sanger, the song was co-produced by Marius de Vries and released as the second single from her second studio album, Ghosts, on 16 June 2007 by Parlophone. Described by Donaghy as one of the most radio-friendly songs on Ghosts, the lyric describes the breakdown of her relationship with her first love. As she did not want to write a revengeful breakup song, Donaghy changed the subject's name to Adam in the lyric, in reference to the biblical first man.

The music video for the track was directed by Jamie Thraves. The psychological horror-themed video shows Donaghy pursuing a possessed man until she becomes possessed herself. The video was inspired by the work of David Lynch, specifically his film Inland Empire. The song received positive reviews upon release, but performed poorly on the UK Singles Chart, peaking at number 76. It performed better on the Scottish Singles Chart, where it peaked at number 29.

== Composition and style ==
The song was written by Donaghy and producer James Sanger, and was co-produced by Marius de Vries. Donaghy described "So You Say" as one of the most radio-friendly songs on Ghosts. However, she said this occurred "quite coincidentally", as it was not the intention of anyone involved to create a radio-friendly song. She explained: "Quite honestly, I don't think I am a good enough songwriter to write according to a certain formula and say 'now I'm going to write a radio-friendly song.' That's a really difficult job. All I can do is my best."

The lyric of the track references Donaghy's first love, whom she lived with for three years before ending the relationship. She said she did not want to write a "revengeful song", so changed his name to Adam in the lyric, as a reference to the biblical first man. She explained she is "not actually religious, but people can identify with [the name], and also you can say, 'Well, you don't know him from Adam.'" It is the only song Donaghy has written examining a romantic relationship, as she considers that subject matter "quite clichéd". However, she said discussing romantic relationships in pop music can "really work when you get [the lyric] right. I wanted to keep the lyrics quite simple, which I think I did. I really like it; I think it works."

"So You Say" is a pop song consisting of a verse–chorus structure. It is built around a moderate tempo of 115 beats per minute and a repeated bassline pattern of A♭–D♭, although the melody is augmented by backing vocals and melodies performed on keyboards and synthesizers. Donaghy's vocal range on the song spans over three octaves, from A♭2 to D♯5.

== Release and promotion ==
The single was released commercially on 16 June 2007. It was preceded by remixes from Patrick Wolf and Robert Logan & Ivor Guest, which were both released individually for digital download the previous day. The music video for the song was directed by Jamie Thraves. The psychological horror-themed video shows Donaghy walking through a house filled with winding corridors, and entering various rooms whilst following a man. She is featured in a room with almost motionless birds and in another with shattered glass floating around her. Near the end of the video, she confronts the man, who seems to be possessed, with his eyes and mouth glowing. She then kisses him and becomes possessed herself. The video was filmed in a disused police station and an old magistrates' court, and its story was loosely based on the David Lynch film Inland Empire.

== Critical reception ==
The Guardian dubbed the song the "Pick of the Week", saying it contains a "lovely warp of a chorus that just corkscrews into your ears and heart." Digital Spy said the song contained "elegant, understated verses" and a "colossal chorus, while Donaghy's multi-tracked vocals attack the heartbroken lyrics with real conviction." Similarly, AllMusic said the track contains a "colossal chorus", which they said "shows Donaghy isn't averse to creating potential hit singles." In their review of the album, Stylus Magazine said "So You Say" and previous single "Don't Give It Up" compliment each other, saying they both achieve "an admirable state of blissful, catchy symphonic pop". NME compared "So You Say" to an imaginary cover of the Sugababes song "New Year" by Elizabeth Fraser of the Cocteau Twins, while Yahoo! Music noted similarities to the work of Burt Bacharach.

== Commercial performance ==
The single charted at number 76 on the UK Singles Chart. It was more successful on the Scottish Singles Chart, peaking at number 29.

== Formats and track listings ==
All songs are written by Siobhán Donaghy and James Sanger, except "Don't Take Me Back", written by Pauline Taylor and Matty Benbrook.

So You Say – UK CD1
No.	Title	Producer(s)	Length
1.	"So You Say"	Sanger; Marius de Vries^{[a]}	4:22
2.	"Don't Take Me Back"	Sanger	4:24
Total length:			8:46

So You Say – UK CD2
No.	Title	Producer(s)	Length
1.	"So You Say"	Sanger; de Vries^{[a]}	4:21
2.	"Don't Give It Up" (Robert Cory Remix)	Sanger; Cory^{[b]}	2:08
3.	"So You Say" (Acoustic)	Matty Benbrook^{[c]}	3:45
4.	"So You Say" (Enhanced Video)
5.	"So You Say" (Enhanced Making of the Video)
Total length:			10:14

So You Say – 12" picture disc
No.	Title	Producer(s)	Length
1.	"So You Say"	Sanger; de Vries^{[a]}	4:22
2.	"Don't Give It Up" (Carl Craig Vox Remix)	Sanger; Craig^{[b]}	9:07
Total length:			13:31

So You Say – Patrick Wolf Remix
No.	Title	Producer(s)	Length
1.	"So You Say" (Patrick Wolf Remix)	Sanger; de Vries^{[a]}; Wolf^{[b]}	4:11

So You Say – Robert Logan and Ivor Guest Remix
No.	Title	Producer(s)	Length
1.	"So You Say" (Robert Logan and Ivor Guest Remix)	Sanger; de Vries^{[a]}; Logan^{[b]}; Guest^{[b]}	4:58

Notes

- ^{^[a]} signifies a co-producer
- ^{^[b]} signifies a remixer
- ^{^[c]} signifies a recording engineer

== Credits and personnel ==
Credits adapted from the liner notes of the "So You Say" CD singles and Ghosts.

- Ben Allen – guitar and arrangement on "So You Say" (Acoustic Version)
- Matty Benbrook – recording and mixing on "So You Say" (Acoustic Version)
- Jason Boshoff – programming and additional engineering on "So You Say"
- Siobhán Donaghy – vocals
- Darren Evans – sleeve design
- Ash Howes – mixing on "So You Say" and "Don't Take Me Back"
- James Sanger – programming and production on "So You Say" and "Don't Take Me Back"
- Floria Sigismondi – photography
- Marius de Vries – co-production on "So You Say"

== Charts ==
Chart performance for "So You Say"
Chart (2007)	Peak position
Scotland Singles (OCC)	29
UK Singles (OCC)	76
