= Jerry Bouthier =

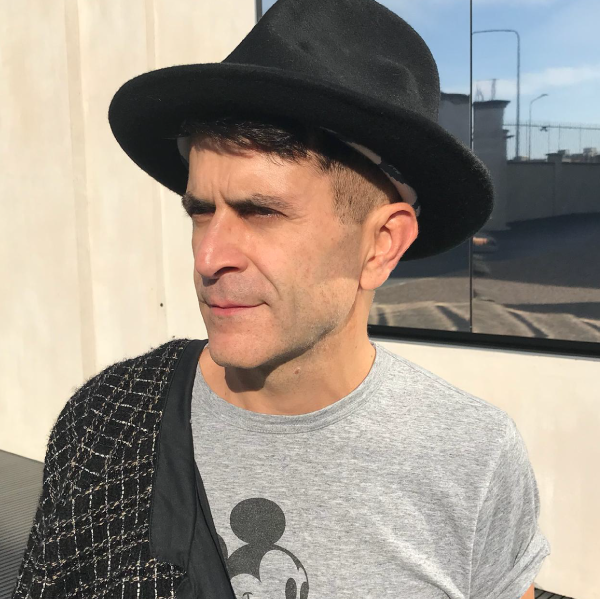
- Jerry Bouthier in 2018

Background information
- Born: Jérôme Léonard Bouthier; Marseille, Provence-Alps-French Riviera, France
- Origin: Paris, France; London, England
- Genres: Electronic music, house, electro house
- Occupations: Disc jockey, record producer, songwriter
- Labels: Continental Records, Kitsuné Musique

Jérôme Léonard "Jerry" Bouthier (French pronunciation: [ʒeʁom leɔnaʁ butje]) is a French DJ, house record producer and songwriter. Born in Marseille, originally from Paris and based in London, he produced sound-design for fashion shows and brands, records and remixes as JBAG (with Andrea Gorgerino) and is the A&R of his record label Continental Records.

== Career ==
Inspired by Ibiza and The Haçienda in Manchester, Jerry and his younger brother Tom Bouthier pioneer house music and rave culture in Paris alongside de Laurent Garnier, Dimitri from Paris, Patrick Vidal (Marie et les Garçons)... The pair are A&R and artists on P.U.R. — Paris Union Recording, the first compilation of French electronic artists in the 1990s (which presents the beginnings of Philippe Cohen Solal from Gotan Project and Marc Collin from Nouvelle Vague) and release two singles on Stress (DMC UK's record label), Breakline (1994) et I Love Paris (1995). The brothers move to London, and join the ranks of the Unlimited DJs agency, which introduce them to the UK club scene (Ministry of Sound, Cream, Manumission, Miss Moneypenny's, Gatecrasher...).

At the start of the 21st century, Bouthier pivots to electro, and ends up resident DJ at BoomBox, the infamous London nightclub that brought back individual attitude and imaginative fashion to the dancefloor. After selecting and mixing the Kitsuné-BoomBox CD, he becomes part of the Kitsuné family, deejaying all over the world as ambassador of the label and releasing six mix cds for the Parisian record/clothing label.

He is Vivienne Westwood's music director from 2008 to 2013 and sound-designs the fashion shows of Matthew Williamson, Roksanda Ilincic, Julien Macdonald, Peter Jensen, Kokon to Zai, Sibling and many others.

He is also the step-brother of Mathieu Bouthier, a French house DJ and producer.

He also runs a monthly show on Radio Raheem, an independent radio based in Milan.

== Selected discography ==
=== Singles / Maxis ===
- Riviera Splash – Breakline (Stress)
- Riviera Splash – I Love Paris (Stress)
- Continental Trash – Everybody (Continental)
- Electrique Boutique – Revelation (Continental)
- Little Star – Petite étoile (Continental)
- JBAG – X Ray Sex feat. Louise Prey (Continental)
- JBAG – Mogadsico (Continental)
- JBAG – Through Blue feat. Kamp! (Continental)
- JBAG – Everybody (Come On!) feat. Shindu (Continental)
- Jerry Bouthier – Yeah! (DJ Tools #01) (Continental)

=== Remixes ===
- Kylie Minogue – BoomBox (JBAG Remix) (EMI)
- S'Express – Stupid little girls (JBAG Remix) (Kitsuné)
- Siobhán Donaghy – Don't give it up (JBAG Remix) (Kitsuné)
- Adam Sky & Danny Williams – The Imperious Urge (JBAG Remix) (Exploited)
- Bunny Lake – Army Of Lovers (JBAG Remix) (Universal)
- Variety Lab – Money (JBAG Remix) (Pschent)
- Voltaire Twins – D.I.L. (JBAG Remix)
- Sparks – Good morning (JBAG Remix)
- Ladyhawke – My Delirium (JBAG Remix) (Modular)
- Arnaud Rebotini – Another Time, Another Place (JBAG Remix) (Blackstrobe Records)
- Kamp! – Cairo (JBAG Remix) (Discotexas)
- Reflex – Wavering (JBAG Remix) (Continental)
- Shindu – Happy House (JBAG Remix) (Kitsuné)
- Housse de Racket – Chateau (Kitsuné)
- Mjolnir – Just A Boy (JBAG Remix) (Continental)
- Punks Jump Up – Get Down (Kitsuné)
- Gigamesh – Your Body (JBAG Remix) (Kitsuné)
- RÜFÜS – This Summer (JBAG Remix) (Continental)
- Jupiter – Starlighter (JBAG Remix)
- Two Door Cinema Club – Next Year (JBAG Remix) (Kitsuné)
- Scarlet Fantastic – No Memory ’14 (JBAG Remix) (Continental)
- Romuald & Madji'k – Fastlane (JBAG Remix) (Continental)

=== Compilations ===
- 1992 : P.U.R. (Paris Union Recording) (Delabel)
- 1996 : DJ Culture 3 (Various Artists Mixed by Tom & Jerry Bouthier) (Stress)
- 2007 : Kitsuné Boombox (Various Artists Selected & Mixed by Jerry Bouthier) (Kitsuné)
- 2010 : Kitsuné x Ponystep (Various Artists Selected & Mixed by Jerry Bouthier) (Kitsuné)
- 2011 : 100% Gomma (Various Artists Selected & Mixed by Jerry Bouthier) (Gomma)
- 2012 : Kitsuné Soleil (Various Artists Mixed by Gildas Loaec and Jerry Bouthier) (Kitsuné)
- 2013 : Kitsuné Soleil 2 (Various Artists by Gildas Loaec and Jerry Bouthier) (Kitsuné)
- 2014 : 100% Continental (Various Artists Selected & Mixed by Jerry Bouthier) (Continental)
- 2014 : Kitsuné Trip Mode (Various Artists Selected & Mixed by Jerry Bouthier) (Kitsuné)
- 2015 : Mystery Tour (Various Artists Selected & Mixed by Jerry Bouthier) (Emerald & Doreen)
- 2015 : Voyage Sauvage 1 (Various Artists Mixed by Jerry Bouthier) (Emerald & Doreen)
- 2016 : Café Kitsuné (Various Artists Mixed by Jerry Bouthier) (Kitsuné)
- 2016 : Voyage Sauvage 2 (Various Artists Mixed by Jerry Bouthier) (Emerald & Doreen)
- 2017 : Emerald & Doreen 200 (Various Artists Mixed by Jerry Bouthier) (Emerald & Doreen)
