= Overrated =

Single by Siobhán Donaghy

from the album Revolution in Me
- B-side: "Those Anythings"; "Instances"; "Thus Far"
- Released: 23 June 2003
- Genre: Pop rock
- Length: 4:36
- Label: London
- Songwriters: Siobhán Donaghy; Cameron McVey; Paul Simm
- Producer: Cameron McVey

Siobhán Donaghy singles chronology
"Overrated" (2003)	"Twist of Fate" (2003)

"Overrated" is a song by English singer Siobhán Donaghy, released as the lead single from her debut studio album Revolution in Me (2003). It was released two years after her controversial departure from girl group the Sugababes. "Overrated" was written by Donaghy, Cameron McVey and Paul Simm, and produced by McVey. It is a guitar-led pop rock song about the experiences of disappointment and misery. The song received favourable reviews from critics, who praised Donaghy's vocals and McVey's production. The single became her biggest hit to date, reaching the top twenty in the United Kingdom, and achieving chart success in Australia, Ireland, and the Netherlands.

== Background and development ==
Girl group the Sugababes were formed in 1998 by Donaghy, Mutya Buena and Keisha Buchanan. The group released their debut studio album, One Touch in 2000 through London Records. It reached number 26 in the UK and produced the top ten single "Overload", which earned the group a BRIT Awards nomination for "Best British Single". However, follow-up singles failed to match the success of "Overload", and the group was subsequently dropped by London in 2001. Donaghy left the Sugababes the same year, and was diagnosed with clinical depression amid reports of conflict amongst the other members of the Sugababes. She was eventually replaced by former Atomic Kitten member Heidi Range.

Two years after her departure from the Sugababes, it was confirmed in May 2003 that Donaghy would release her debut single, "Overrated" in June 2003. "Overrated" was later released in the United Kingdom on 23 June 2003 under London Records, as the lead single from her debut studio album Revolution in Me (2003). "Overrated" was written by Donaghy in collaboration with Cameron McVey and Paul Simm, and produced by McVey. McVey also wrote songs for the Sugababes' album One Touch. Musically, "Overrated" is a pop song accompanied by a guitar. The song's lyrical content is an account of disappointment and misery. During the chorus, Donaghy sings "The pain is overrated / The chains so serrated" and makes reference to Catholicism over an acoustic guitar.

== Reception ==
=== Critical response ===
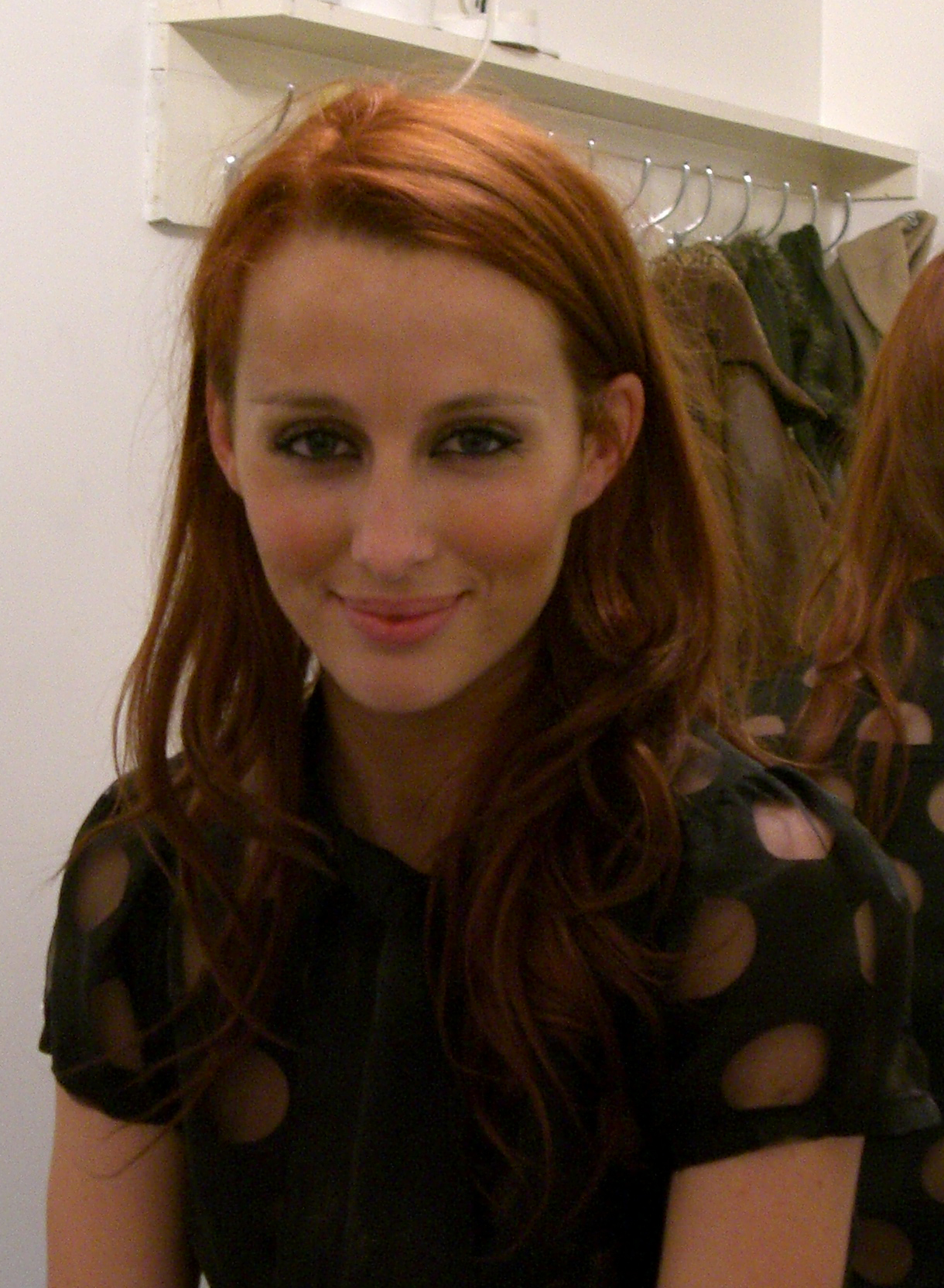
"Overrated" Became Donaghy's biggest hit to date, and her only top twenty single in the UK.

"Overrated" received positive reviews from critics. Daily Record gave it four out of five stars, writing: "Her second stab at success is certain to be more fulfilling for everyone". The Hot Hits Live from LA wrote that the song was reminiscent of those performed by All Saints, and tracks on the Sugababes' debut studio album One Touch, citing McVey's production and writing contribution. Amy Raphael of The Observer praised "Overrated" as a strong pop song, and noted that it is directed at Buena and Buchanan, the remaining members of the Sugababes. Anne-Louise Foley of RTÉ.ie ironically praised "Overrated" as "under-rated". Nadine O Regan from Hot Press named "Overrated" one of the stronger tracks on Revolution in Me, and applauded Donaghy's vocal performance on the song.

=== Commercial performance ===
"Overrated" became Donaghy's most successful single to date. The song debuted and peaked at number 19 on the UK Singles Chart for the issue dated 5 July 2003, and was Donaghy's first and only single to reach the top twenty in the UK. The song was A-listed on BBC's Radio 1 radio program. "Overrated" debuted and peaked at number 33 on the Irish Singles Chart, and is Donaghy's only single to chart in Ireland. The song reached number 75 on the Netherlands Mega Single Top 100 chart. "Overrated" peaked at number 15 on the Australian ARIA Hitseekers chart.

== Track listing ==
UK CD 1

1. "Overrated" (Single Version) - 4:37
2. "Those Anythings" - 4:09
3. "Instances" - 4:28

UK CD 2

1. "Overrated" (Radio Edit) - 3:43
2. "Thus Far" - 5:51
3. "Overrated" (Video)

German & Australian Maxi CD

1. "Overrated" (Radio Edit) - 3:43
2. "Thus Far" - 5:51
3. "Those Anythings" - 4:09
4. "Instances" - 4:28
5. "Overrated" (Single Version) - 4:37

== Charts ==
Chart performance for "Overrated"
Chart (2003)	Peak position
Australian Hitseekers (ARIA)	15
Ireland (IRMA)	33
Netherlands (Dutch Top 40 Tipparade)	2
Netherlands (Single Top 100)	75
Scottish Singles Sales (Official Charts)	21
UK Singles (Official Charts)	19
