= List of songs recorded by Girls Aloud =

This is a list of all songs performed by the British pop girl group Girls Aloud.

== Original songs ==
Title	Album	Year
"100 Different Ways"	What Will The Neighbours Say? bonus track	2004
"All I Need (All I Don't)"	Sound of the Underground	2003
"Androgynous Girls"	"Love Machine" CD2	2004
"Beautiful 'Cause You Love Me"	Ten	2012
"Big Brother"	What Will The Neighbours Say?	2004
"Biology"	Chemistry	2005
"Black Jacks"	Tangled Up	2007
"Blow Your Cover"	"Call the Shots" CD2	2007
"Boogie Down Love"	Sound of the Underground	2002
"Call the Shots"	Tangled Up	2007
"Can't Speak French"	Tangled Up	2007
"Christmas Round at Ours"	Chemistry Christmas bonus disc	2005
"Close to Love"	Tangled Up	2007
"Control of the Knife"	Tangled Up	2007
"Count the Days"	Chemistry Christmas bonus disc	2005
"Crazy Fool"	"Whole Lotta History" CD1	2006
"The Crazy Life"	"Something Kinda Ooooh" CD1	2006
"Crocodile Tears"	Tangled Up	2007
"Damn"	Tangled Up	2007
"Disco Bunny"	"What Will The Neighbours Say?" 20th Anniversary Edition	2024
"Dog Without a Bone"	"Sexy! No No No..." CD2	2007
"Don't Want You Back"	Sound of the Underground	2003
"Every Now and Then"	Ten	2012
"Everything You Ever Wanted"	Sound of the Underground	2003
"Fix Me Up"	Out of Control	2008
"Fling"	Tangled Up	2007
"Forever and a Night"	Sound of the Underground	2003
"Girl Overboard"	Tangled Up	2007
"Girls Allowed"	Sound of the Underground	2003
"Graffiti My Soul"	What Will The Neighbours Say?	2004
"Hear Me Out"	What Will The Neighbours Say?	2004
"History"	"Wake Me Up" CD2	2005
"Hoxton Heroes"	"Can't Speak French" CD1	2008
"I'm Falling"	Tangled Up	2007
"I Don't Really Hate You"	"See the Day" CD2	2005
"I Say a Prayer for You"	What Will The Neighbours Say? bonus track	2004
"I Wanna Kiss You So (Christmas In A Nutshell)"	Chemistry Christmas bonus disc	2005
"Intro"	Chemistry	2005
"It's Magic"	Chemistry	2005
"It's Your Dynamite"	"Untouchable" CD	2009
"Je Ne Parle Pas Francais"	"Can't Speak French" CD2	2008
"Life Got Cold"	Sound of the Underground	2003
"Lights, Music, Camera Action"	"Life Got Cold" cassette/European CD	2003
"Live in the Country"	Out of Control	2008
"Long Hot Summer"	Chemistry	2005
"Love Bomb"	Sound of the Underground	2002
"Love Machine"^{[A]}	What Will The Neighbours Say?	2004
"Love/Hate"	Sound of the Underground	2003
"Love Is the Key"	Out of Control	2008
"Love is Pain"	Out of Control	2008
"Loving is Easy"^{[B]}	"Wake Me Up" 7"	2005
"The Loving Kind"	Out of Control	2008
"Mars Attack"	Sound of the Underground	2003
"Memory of You"	"The Loving Kind" 7"	2009
"Miss You Bow Wow"	Out of Control	2008
"Models"	Chemistry	2005
"Money"	The Sound of Girls Aloud	2006
"My Heart"	Tangled Up 20th Anniversary Edition	2026
"Naked in the Shower"	'Chemistry' 20th Anniversary Edition	2025
"No Good Advice"	Sound of the Underground	2003
"No Regrets"	Chemistry	2005
"Nobody But You"	"Biology" CD2	2005
"Not Tonight Santa"	Chemistry Christmas bonus disc	2005
"On a Round"	"No Good Advice" CD1	2003
"On My Way to Satisfaction"	St. Trinian's: The Soundtrack	2007
"On the Metro"	Ten	2012
"The Promise"	Out of Control	2008
"Racy Lacey"	Chemistry	2005
"Real Life"	What Will The Neighbours Say?	2004
"Revolution in the Head"	Out of Control	2008
"Rolling Back the Rivers in Time"	Out of Control	2008
"Sexy! No No No..."	Tangled Up	2007
"She"	"The Promise" CD	2008
"The Show"	What Will The Neighbours Say?	2004
"Singapore"^{[C]}	The Sound of Girls Aloud rarities bonus disc	2006
"Some Kind of Miracle"	Sound of the Underground	2003
"Something Kinda Ooooh"	The Sound of Girls Aloud	2006
"Something New"	Ten	2012
"Sound of the Underground"	Sound of the Underground	2002
"Stop"	Sound of the Underground	2003
"Swinging London Town"	Chemistry	2005
"Thank Me Daddy"	What Will The Neighbours Say?	2004
"Theme to St. Trinian's"	St. Trinian's: The Soundtrack	2007
"Turn to Stone"	Out of Control	2008
"Untouchable"	Out of Control	2008
"Waiting"	Chemistry	2005
"Wake Me Up"^{[D]}	What Will The Neighbours Say?	2004
"Watch Me Go"	Chemistry	2005
"What You Crying For"	Tangled Up	2007
"What's a Girl to Do?"	Tangled Up 20th Anniversary Edition	2026
"White Lies"	Sound of the Underground	2003
"Whole Lotta History"	Chemistry	2005
"Why Do It?"	"I Think We're Alone Now" CD1	2006
"Wild Horses"	Chemistry	2005
"You Freak Me Out"	Sound of the Underground re-issue	2003
"You Go Too Fast"	'Chemistry' 20th Anniversary Edition	2025

== Covers ==
Title	Album	Original artist	Year
"Baby When You Go"	What Will The Neighbours Say? 20th Anniversary Edition	Mania	2024
"Broken Strings"	Out of Control: Live from the O2 2009	James Morrison featuring Nelly Furtado	2009
"Deadlines & Diets"	What Will The Neighbours Say?	Moonbaby	2004
"Girls on Film"^{[E]}	"Life Got Cold" CD1	Duran Duran	2003
"Grease"^{[F]}	"Jump" CD1	Frankie Valli	2003
"Hanging on the Telephone"	The Sound of Girls Aloud rarities bonus disc	The Nerves	2006
"Here We Go"	What Will The Neighbours Say?	Moonbaby	2004
"Hopelessly Devoted to You"	ITV's Greasemania	Olivia Newton-John	2003
"I'll Stand by You"	What Will The Neighbours Say?	The Pretenders	2004
"I'm Every Woman"	ITV's Discomania	Chaka Khan	2004
"I Predict a Riot"	The Sound of Girls Aloud rarities bonus disc	Kaiser Chiefs	2006
"I Think We're Alone Now"	The Sound of Girls Aloud	Tommy James & The Shondells	2006
"I Wish It Could Be Christmas Everyday"	Chemistry Christmas bonus disc	Wizzard	2005
"Jingle Bell Rock"	Chemistry Christmas bonus disc	Bobby Helms	2005
"Jump"^{[G]}	Sound of the Underground re-issue	The Pointer Sisters	2003
"Merry Xmas Everybody"	Chemistry Christmas bonus disc	Slade	2005
"Rehab"	"Call the Shots" CD1	Amy Winehouse	2007
"Sacred Trust"	The Sound of Girls Aloud rarities bonus disc	Bee Gees	2002
"See the Day"	Chemistry	Dee C. Lee	2005
"Sound and Vision"^{[H]}	Radio 1 Established 1967	David Bowie	2007
"Stay Another Day"	"Sound of the Underground" CD1	East 17	2002
"Teenage Dirtbag"	Radio 1 Established 1967	Wheatus	2007
"Walk This Way"^{[I]}	Comic Relief charity single	Aerosmith	2007
"We Wanna Party"	Out of Control	Lene	2008
"White Christmas"	Chemistry Christmas bonus disc	Bing Crosby	2005
"Wicked Game"	What Will The Neighbours Say? 20th Anniversary Edition	Chris Isaak	2024
"With Every Heartbeat"	Radio 1's Live Lounge – Volume 3	Robyn and Kleerup	2008
"Womanizer"	Out of Control: Live from the O2 2009	Britney Spears	2009

== Live songs ==
- "Apologize" – Jo Whiley's Live Lounge, 2008
- "Beneath Your Beautiful" – Radio 1 Live Lounge, 2012
- "Broken Strings" – Out of Control Tour, 2009
- "Call Me Maybe" – Ten: The Hits Tour, 2013
- "Celebration" – Children in Need, 2004
- "Fame" / "What a Feeling" / "Footloose" (Musicals Medley) – Chemistry Tour, 2006
- "I Predict a Riot" – Chemistry Tour, 2006 (available on The Sound of Girls Aloud rarities bonus disc)
- "Do You Love Me" / "She's Like the Wind" / "(I've Had) The Time of My Life" (Dirty Dancing Medley) – The Sound of Girls Aloud: The Greatest Hits Tour, 2007
- "Push It" – Tangled Up Tour, 2008
- "Rehab" – Jo Whiley's Live Lounge, 2006 (available on "Call the Shots" CD1)
- "Santa Claus Is Coming to Town" – Friday Night Project Christmas special, 2007
- "With Every Heartbeat" – Jo Whiley's Live Lounge, 2007 (available on "Can't Speak French" CD2) / Tangled Up Tour, 2008
- "Womanizer" – Out of Control Tour, 2009
- "You're The One That I Want" – Greasemaina, 2003

== Unreleased songs ==
These songs were recorded by Girls Aloud, but remain unreleased.

- "All I Ever Do" (Miranda Cooper/Brian Higgins/Tim Powell/ Nick Coler/Paul Woods/Bryony Afferson/Lauren Blake/Helena Dowling/Hayley Angel Wardle)
- "Little Drops of Heaven" (Steve Lee/Nigel Lowis/Paul Meehan)
- "Out of Control" (Sound of the Underground sessions)
- "Our Lips Are Sealed" (The Go-Go's)
- "Shame" (Hannah Robinson, Andrew Watkins, Paul Wilson)
- "Sorry" (Alana Hood, John McLaughlin, Sarah Osuji, Stephen Robson, Hannah Thompson)
- "Where Did The Love Go?" (Girls Aloud, Brian Higgins)
- "Bored Stupid" (Tangled Up sessions)

== See also ==
- Girls Aloud discography
- List of awards and nominations received by Girls Aloud
- List of Girls Aloud concert tours
- List of best-selling girl groups

== Footnotes ==
- A A drastically different demo version of "Love Machine" appears on Popjustice: 100% Solid Pop Music.
- B Appears in CD form on the rarities disc of The Sound of Girls Aloud.
- C Outtake from the Chemistry sessions.
- D An alternate demo of "Wake Me Up" appears on the rarities disc of The Sound of Girls Aloud.
- E Later appeared on the re-issue of Sound of the Underground.
- F From ITV1's Greasemania.
- G Later appeared on What Will the Neighbours Say?
- H Backing vocals for Franz Ferdinand.
- I Collaboration with Sugababes.
- J Performed with James Morrison himself at The Girls Aloud Party.
