= Swinging London Town =

Song by Girls Aloud

from the album Chemistry
- Released: 5 December 2005
- Recorded: April 2005
- Genre: Synth-pop; techno
- Length: 4:02
- Label: Polydor
- Songwriters: Miranda Cooper; Brian Higgins; Tim Powell; Matt Gray
- Producers: Brian Higgins; Xenomania

Chemistry track listing
- 13 tracks: 1. "Intro"; 2. "Models"; 3. "Biology"; 4. "Wild Horses"; 5. "See the Day"; 6. "Watch Me Go"; 7. "Waiting"; 8. "Whole Lotta History"; 9. "Long Hot Summer"; 10. "Swinging London Town"; 11. "It's Magic"; 12. "No Regrets"; 13. "Racy Lacey"

"Swinging London Town" is a song by British girl group Girls Aloud, taken from their third studio album Chemistry (2005). The song was written by Miranda Cooper, Brian Higgins, Tim Powell, and Matt Gray, and produced by Higgins and Xenomania. "Swinging London Town" both chronicles and ridicules the lives of the upper class in London, particularly yuppies, socialites and it girls. Influenced by techno, the synth-pop song drew comparisons to Giorgio Moroder and Pet Shop Boys.

Contemporary music critics praised "Swinging London Town" for Xenomania's creative and skilled production, while some reviewers noted the irony of Girls Aloud singing the song's lyrics. In 2012, fans voted for "Swinging London Town" to be included on the second disc to the deluxe edition of their greatest hits album Ten.

== Background and composition ==
In 2005, Girls Aloud began recording their third studio album Chemistry. The album was described as "a concept album which relates to the girls and what it's like to be a twentysomething girl in London". "Swinging London Town" in particular chronicles "the diverse characters - from wannabes to trustafarians - found in the nation's capital."

The song's lyrics were described as "a cautionary tale" with lyrics like "A big time Gucci-girl, a first in retail therapy / I'm on a downward slide to rehab and all of it's for free." The lyrics also contain a veiled reference towards cocaine with the lyric "joke-fuelled ego." The lyrics also name drop former it girl Edie Sedgwick's 1965 film Poor Little Rich Girl, while the title itself refers to the 1960s term Swinging London.

"Swinging London Town" was written by Miranda Cooper, Brian Higgins, Tim Powell, and Matt Gray, and produced by Higgins and his production team Xenomania. The production of the song was described as "a dark, squiggly synth pop epic a la Pet Shop Boys," while the lyrical content was compared to Pet Shop Boys' "West End Girls". The song itself was described as "a collision of warp-speed funk guitar riffs and distorted Giorgio Moroder-style techno-disco that unexpectedly drops into wafting movie-soundtrack ambience." "Swinging London Town" also received comparisons to the Chemical Brothers.

== Release ==
"Swinging London Town" was originally released as a track on Girls Aloud's third studio album Chemistry on 5 December 2005. It was not performed on 2006's Chemistry Tour nor given a single release. Band member Nicola Roberts referred to the track as one of her favourites from Girls Aloud's back catalogue. In 2012, Girls Aloud fans selected "Swinging London Town" to be one of ten songs included on the deluxe edition bonus disc of their greatest hits collection Ten.

== Reception ==
The song received widespread acclaim from contemporary music critics. Alexis Petridis of The Guardian joked, "It should sound like a cautionary tale, but the music [...] is so glorious that it makes a downward slide to rehab sound about as much fun as it's possible to have." Kitty Empire of The Observer praised the song's production. She wrote that "the skill and nous that have gone into songs such as 'Swinging London Town' are unimpeachable. There hasn't been a song since the Pet Shop Boys' 'West End Girls' that captures the ugly charms of London on a Friday night, but 'Swinging London Town' comes close." Michael Deacon of The Daily Telegraph wrote, "After the dark, hyperventilating dance rush of Swinging London Town, the band could legitimately rename themselves the Chemical Sisters." John Murphy of musicOMH said the song "sounds like the best night out you'll ever have set to a frenetic dance beat."

However, alongside other songs from Chemistry, "Swinging London Town" received attention due to its lyrical content. It was suggested that the song "toys with the girls' reputation for partying a little too heartily." William Swygart of Stylus Magazine noted that the song's protagonist could easily be the futures of the members of Girls Aloud themselves: "Girls Aloud might just be the most universally critically acclaimed musical act in Britain today [...] and they're still the pieces of meat that, when the time is right, will be thrown in the bin."

== Credits and personnel ==
- Guitar: Nick Coler
- Keyboards: Brian Higgins, Tim Powell, Nick Coler
- Mastering: Dick Beetham for 360 Mastering
- Mixing: Brian Higgins, Tim Powell
- Production: Brian Higgins, Xenomania, Jeremy Wheatley (additional)
- Programming: Brian Higgins, Tim Powell, Jon Shave
- Songwriting: Miranda Cooper, Brian Higgins, Tim Powell, Matt Gray
- Published by Warner/Chappell Music and Xenomania Music
