= Girls Aloud: Off the Record =

- Starring: Sarah Harding; Nicola Roberts; Nadine Coyle; Cheryl; Kimberley Walsh
- Opening theme: "Models"
- Country of origin: United Kingdom
- Original language: English
- No. of episodes: 6

Production
- Running time: 30 minutes
- Production companies: Monkey Kingdom; Globe Productions

Original release
- Network: E4
- Release: 11 April – 16 May 2006

Related
- Popstars: The Rivals; Girls Aloud: Home Truths; The Passions of Girls Aloud; The Girls Aloud Party

Girls Aloud: Off the Record is a six-part series recorded by Girls Aloud for E4 that started on 11 April 2006 at 10:30pm. The show was produced by E4 and Monkey Kingdom Productions for Channel Four Television Corporation.

The series follows Girls Aloud in the buildup to their 2006 Chemistry arena tour, from appearing on TV shows to filming the "Whole Lotta History" video in Paris, promoting in Australia and New Zealand, doing promotional appearances in Ibiza and Greece, and going on an ambassadorial trip to China. The series also follows a selection of Girls Aloud's fans, including two Australian fans who spent all their money on tickets to Girls Aloud's Wembley show. The girls' personal lives were featured too – Ashley Cole appears in the first and sixth episode.

Girls Aloud: Off the Record was repeated on Channel 4 as of 3 September 2006. A DVD of the series was released on 28 August 2006. It was originally planned to be released on 16 July (as stated on Amazon.co.uk and HMV.co.uk), but was delayed to September, as stated on the Girls Aloud official site.

== Background and production ==
In February 2006, it was announced that Girls Aloud were already in the process of filming a reality show. The programme was part of a partnership between Channel Four Television Corporation and Universal Music, created by E4 and Monkey Kingdom Productions for Channel Four. The series was produced by Vicky Crawley, while David Granger and Will Macdonald served as executive producers.

== Cast ==
Regulars

- Sarah Harding
- Nicola Roberts
- Nadine Coyle
- Cheryl Cole
- Kimberley Walsh

Recurring

- Hilary Shaw
- Rachel Cooke
- Drew (Tour Manager)
- Jesse Metcalfe

Guest Stars

- Amelle Berrabah
- Samiya Berrabah
- Zakiya Berrabah
- Keisha Buchanan
- Ashley Cole
- Calum Best

Notes.

- Paul Nichols narrates the entire 6-part series
- The regular credits order is taken from the title sequence featured in the show.

== Critical reception ==
Writing or The Observer, Paul Morley slated the show. He wrote, "the fraudulently titled Off the Record is just one long, gushing promotional push for the group, an attempt to prolong their fragile careers for just a few more months by pretending to analyse the exciting, stressful reality of being a girl in a group such as Girls Aloud attempting to transcend their manufactured roots. Sort of a smutty comedy, sort of a tragedy, sort of a gossipy, fake-provocative documentary, sort of a heavily censored electronic press kit, there's little sleaze, insight or emotional disintegration."

== Episodes ==
=== Episode 1: 11 April 2006 ===
The programme started with Cheryl going shopping at Bluewater with her mother Joan, with Cheryl talking about her arrest for assault in 2003, and the lessons she learned from the incident. Cheryl was then shown ready to go out to Julien Macdonald's show at London Fashion Week with her fiancé Ashley Cole, who was reluctant to come. At the show, Cheryl had to promote Girls Aloud to various radio and television channels, some of whom had never heard of the band. After the show, Cheryl and Ashley were driven to a restaurant for a Valentine's Day meal, followed by paparazzi. Girls Aloud's tour manager Drew let the paparazzi take pictures of Cheryl and Ashley getting into the restaurant, saying they would rather be photographed before a meal than after.

The next part started with the girls on a promotional visit to Ibiza, performing at a club night. They were then shown eating at a restaurant, where Sarah and Kimberley competed in a drinking game. Afterwards, the girls were shown relaxing by a pool in their bikinis at their private villa, when they spotted a photographer hiding in the bushes far away. The girls complained about this, but their manager Hillary Shaw said that part of the Girls Aloud package included being photographed in various situations, some of which not to their liking. Kimberley and Nadine then talked about various encounters with the paparazzi.

The girls were then shown getting ready to perform at CD:UK, with their TV plugger talking about how important television is in promoting Girls Aloud. Hillary then talked about how Girls Aloud were snubbed by the BRIT Awards, leading to a segment where the Sugababes, who were also on CD:UK, came to talk to Girls Aloud about the Brits situation. This led to a funny moment where Cheryl thought that Amelle Berrabah's older sister was her mum. The cameras then went outside to talk to some of Girls Aloud's fans, and then it was shown how hours of preparation lead to just three minutes performing on TV.

- Guest stars: Amelle Berrabah, Samiya Berrabah, Zakiya Berrabah, Keisha Buchanan, Ashley Cole, Hillary Shaw

=== Episode 2: 18 April 2006 ===
This episode was mostly about the promotion of Girls Aloud's 12th single "Whole Lotta History", and all the work they have to do in order to make it a hit. First the girls were shown on a couple of TV shows, and then flew to Paris to film the video. On the set, Cheryl did not understand the French film crew, and the girls found it a bit cold during filming. The record label then looked at the video, and seemed to be a bit concerned that Sarah did not appear solo in the video until a couple of minutes into the video. The girls were then shown the finished video, and Nicola did not like it, saying that she looked pale and did not have enough makeup on. The girls then said that "Whole Lotta History" deserved to be a Top 3 hit.

Next, the girls were doing a magazine shoot for GQ, showcasing themselves as glitzy showgirls. Cheryl and Kimberley were unsure about their outfits, and said that they were uncomfortable in doing the shoot. Sarah was also concerned about pictures of her that made her look like she was naked. During the shoot, Sarah's friend and rumoured lover Calum Best showed up to explain a story that had appeared in a newspaper that day about him saying bad things about Sarah. They then went away to discuss the story, and Sarah was upset when she came back onto the shoot.

The girls were then shown doing a variety of TV shows, including GMTV, Davina and Holly & Stephen's Saturday Showdown, looking very tired through all the TV shows they had to be on in such a short time. During these shows, the girls were kept up to date on the midweek position of "Whole Lotta History", which started out at #9 and rose up to #5. Backstage at the shows, the girls discussed their figures and other insecurities, and Nicola took time out to get a facial. Backstage at Davina, the girls met Jordan and Peter Andre – Sarah was delighted to see Jordan again.

At the end of the show, Nadine received a call from Radio 1 DJs Scott Mills and Tim Westwood, informing her that "Whole Lotta History" charted at #6, a position only Cheryl seemed to be satisfied with. The girls then started their rehearsals for the arena tour.

- Guest stars: Calum Best

=== Episode 3: 25 April 2006 ===
Hillary got the girls together to go through their schedule for the promotional tour of New Zealand and Australia, but Sarah was absent, having been to the hospital because of illness. However, when it came time to fly, Sarah was better and with the girls. Landing in New Zealand and recovering from the long flight, it was time for the first part of promotion. Polydor hired some local hair stylists and wardrobe people to style the girls for what they thought was a radio interview, but the staff turned up late. When they arrived, they ended up styling Nadine, Nicola and Sarah from the official wardrobe, with Cheryl having already gotten dressed in her own clothes while Kimberley had fallen ill. This led to a massive argument between Cheryl and the head stylist over the delay and the changed plans, which now included the girls going on TV instead of on the radio, with Cheryl fearing that she would look out of place not dressed in wardrobe. This led to their first day of promotion running late.

The girls were next shown rehearsing for their first show of the tour, in a small theatre in Auckland. The girls got annoyed that Polydor had sent them the wrong backing tape for "Sound of the Underground", and there were more wardrobe problems. But when it was time for the show, and seeing the large crowd that had turned up, Girls Aloud were motivated to give a great performance for their New Zealand fans, who went away very impressed.

The next morning, it was time to fly to Sydney, Australia, but Cheryl was hungover from having drunk three cocktails and wine at Nadine's mini bar the night before. Cheryl was feeling incredibly ill, and had vomited up the toast she had eaten. After arriving at the hotel, she again vomited outside on the ground, with Hillary comforting her. Once in Sydney, Cheryl recovered, and the girls continued their promotion, going on various TV and radio shows, including one that most of their hardcore Australian fans came to see. Their biggest Australian fans, Emily and Lang, won a competition to meet the girls at a visit to Taronga Zoo. At the zoo, the girls got close to the koalas and kangaroos, and Emily and Lang got close to the girls.

Relaxing by the pool after the promotion, Nadine got a phone call from Desperate Housewives actor Jesse Metcalfe, who invited her on a date. On the same night, the other girls went out to a bar in Sydney for a wild night of drinking, which finished early for Cheryl after the earlier problems she had with drink. Kimberley, Nicola and Sarah continued their night of fun, partying without fear of being noticed, until Kimberley and Nicola went back to the hotel at 2 am, leaving Sarah on her own to continue clubbing. The next morning, Nadine revealed that her date with Jesse went well and that he gave her a bouquet of flowers. The promotional tour was over with great success – Girls Aloud had entered the Top 30 of the Australian chart.

- Guest stars: Jesse Metcalfe (scenes deleted)

=== Episode 4: 2 May 2006 ===
The Girls were in Athens for two corporate shows that are major paydays for the group. After having performed at the first show, the second show was not for another couple of days, so Sarah decided to fly back home to see her family, and then fly back to Athens for the second show. The other girls were bored doing nothing in their hotel, so their tour manager Drew decided to take them up to the highest vantage point in Athens – without the girls knowing where they were going. Unfortunately for Cheryl, she happened to be wearing spiked heeled shoes, which were not ideal for climbing up tall hills. Kimberley was not happy with the experience either, unusually for her. After they got back down the hill using a cable-car, they realised that they did not know how to get back to their hotel, so they had to cram into a regular taxi – not exactly glamorous travel for Girls Aloud. To make up for a miserable trip, Drew took the girls and their dancers to a Greek bar and restaurant, where they got drunk and merry, although according to Drew, not as much as usual.

Returning home, Nicola drove back to her home town of Runcorn to see her family. First she went to the local park to see her little brother Harry playing football for his local team, coached by their dad. Harry's team won the game, and Nicola in rather biased fashion gave the man of the match award to Harry, signing autographs for the other members of the team. Nicola then went home and cringed as she was shown old videos of her as a little girl. After that, she took Harry and her other younger brother Clayton to a restaurant for a day out, with Nicola talking about the importance of staying close to her family despite being famous, and valuing having a family to come back to after Girls Aloud.

The girls then went to film the TV show Fifth Gear at Silverstone – where they got to race a car round the famous British Grand Prix track to see who got the fastest time. The girls all had fun doing this, and while it was not revealed which girl recorded the fastest time (the laps were later broadcast on the 15 May 2006 episode of Fifth Gear), the experience did excite Sarah enough to ask the producers and track officials if she could do a lap in their Ferrari F355. However, once she got in, she proceeded to smash the Ferrari right into a people carrier before she had even left the car park. Sarah then took off down the track unaware of exactly how much damage she had done. The other girls were in hysterics when Sarah came back and realised just what she had done.

=== Episode 5: 9 May 2006 ===
The girls flew to Shanghai, China along with Mayor of London Ken Livingstone to help promote London in China. Upon arrival, Cheryl and Nicola already felt homesick, complaining about the rain, the culture and the Chinese toilets. Nadine and Sarah were more upbeat, looking forward to experiencing Shanghai as they visited a temple, unsure of exactly how to pray. After rehearsals for the big show the next night, the girls talked about how big it was that they were asked to represent London, showing how far they had come in four years. The next day, after a photocall with Ken, Girls Aloud realised how popular the winner of Chinese Pop Idol was, with every fan at the venue there to see her, and hardly any of them knowing who Girls Aloud were. After the performance, Nadine felt it was the worst performance they had ever done, and the other girls were unsure about it, but both Ken and the other London officials loved the show, and felt that the project was a success.

The second half of the show focused on Kimberley and Cheryl going home – first we saw Kimberley returning to her home in London that she shares with her boyfriend Justin Scott, a singer with the boyband Triple 8. Whilst Kimberley was in Shanghai, Justin had bought some new furniture for their outside roof space overlooking London, which he installed with Kimberley. Justin then talked about what Kimberley is like at home and in Girls Aloud, and Kimberley then talked about how she has two homes in London and Bradford, and how she feels at home in both cities.

Cheryl then went home to Newcastle-upon-Tyne for a flying visit with tour manager Drew. She only had five hours before she had to return to London, so first she spent a couple of hours with her dad and his partner. Her dad talked about how he did not feel like Cheryl on television is his daughter, but is definitely sure when Cheryl is home. After a meal there, Cheryl said her goodbyes and went to see her older brother and her two nephews, with a niece on the way. This visit was not as happy for Cheryl, as because she had been away from home so long, both her nephews did not recognise her, and would not hug or kiss her. To make matters worse, her brother's dog urinated on her top. Leaving her brother to go back to London, Cheryl talked about how hard it was to lead a family life when she spent so much time in London as part of her job, one of the many sacrifices she had to make being a part of Girls Aloud.

=== Episode 6: 16 May 2006 ===
The final episode focused on the buildup to Girls Aloud's Chemistry Tour, which was a week away. The girls had a meeting at Polydor Records over the direction of the tour, but Nadine and Sarah seemed uninterested, and Cheryl mentioned how the meetings were holding up her wedding plans. An argument started between the girls, and filming was halted. Cheryl then spoke about how the other girls could sometimes get on her nerves when they were together for a very long period of time. The next day, the girls – minus Sarah – had a meeting with a costume designer, who talked Girls Aloud through some of the costumes they would be wearing on tour, but Nadine left the meeting halfway through. It turned out that Nadine and Sarah were homesick and wanted to see their mothers. Nadine's mum talked about how a psychic foresaw that Nadine would be a famous singer, and Sarah's mum talked about how Sarah was tired of going to nightclubs as a single girl, and wanted to settle down with a man.

After the meetings, Kimberley went back home to Bradford to see her family, helping her mum cook Sunday dinner complete with Yorkshire Puddings. Kimberley's big sister Sally talked about what it was like to have a major celebrity for a sister, and then the Walsh siblings (Kimberley, Sally, little sister Amy and brother Adam) all went out to Leeds for the night. Sally talked about how she felt protective of Kimberley when they were out in clubs, even though Kimberley was happy enough to mix with regular clubbers, having photos taken and signing autographs for fans. However, the bad side of mixing with regular people was also shown, with drunk people trying to get in her way, and other people insulting Girls Aloud. Kimberley then talked about how to tolerate people who did not like the band. Cheryl was then shown having lunch with her fiancé Ashley Cole, talking about their wedding and future plans. They were then shown walking their dogs through a park, and Cheryl talked about how she saw Girls Aloud going for a few more years yet, but did not imagine herself still on stage singing "Love Machine" in her 30s.

Rehearsals for the tour began, however, Nadine was away in New York City, and could not get back in time. The girls and their group of dancers were taken through the first two dance routines – for "Biology" and "Waiting" – by their choreographer. The girls were very excited about the rehearsals, realising that going on tour was their biggest dream, and their favourite thing about being in Girls Aloud, although they seemed to be mucking about during the rehearsals. The next day, Nadine finally showed up for her first rehearsal, where the girls learnt more routines, including one for a cover of the Kaiser Chiefs song "I Predict a Riot".

At the end of the show, the girls talked about what it was like to film the series. Nadine did not take too kindly to the experience, saying that she never liked the idea of cameras following her around, having previously stated she was a very private person. She believed the group was incorrectly portrayed in a negative light in some parts the series. Cheryl thought that she could learn a few lessons about herself from watching the series, and Ashley seemed to enjoy it too. Kimberley, Nicola and Sarah all enjoyed the series, saying that they could not wait for it to come out on DVD so that they could show any future children what life was like for them in Britain's biggest girl band, Girls Aloud.

- Guest stars: Ashley Cole

== Repeats ==
The show sometimes runs repeats on multi-channel 4Music. It began airing on the station in 2009.
