= The Sound of Girls Aloud: The Greatest Hits =

2006 compilation album by Girls Aloud

- Standard artwork; deluxe limited edition features a hot pink background

Greatest hits album by Girls Aloud
- Released: 23 October 2006
- Recorded: November 2002 – September 2006
- Genre: Pop
- Length: 56:01
- Label: Fascination
- Producers: Brian Higgins; Xenomania

Girls Aloud chronology
Chemistry (2005)	The Sound of Girls Aloud: The Greatest Hits (2006)	Tangled Up (2007)

Singles from The Sound of Girls Aloud
- 1. "Something Kinda Ooooh" Released: 23 October 2006; 2. "I Think We're Alone Now" Released: 18 December 2006

The Sound of Girls Aloud: The Greatest Hits is the first greatest hits album of British girl group Girls Aloud. It was first released in the United Kingdom through a limited edition on 23 October 2006, while the standard version was released on 30 October 2006. The Sound of Girls Aloud features twelve of the group's singles, two of which reached number one in the UK. The album features three new tracks, with "Something Kinda Ooooh" and "I Think We're Alone Now" being released as singles and peaking inside the top five on the UK singles chart.

The Sound of Girls Aloud received positive reviews from critics, who praised it as a reflection of the group's success. The album entered the UK Albums Chart at number one, making it Girls Aloud's first album to do so. It also peaked at number nine on the Irish Albums Chart. In 2009, the International Federation of the Phonographic Industry (IFPI) recognised The Sound of Girls Aloud as one of the nine albums that year to sell at least 1 million units in Europe.

== Release and content ==
On 6 October 2006, Girls Aloud announced that they would release their first compilation album, following rumours that they would split after Chemistry (2005). A limited edition of The Sound of Girls Aloud was released in the United Kingdom on 23 October. The limited edition included a bonus disc with alternate edits of the group's previous singles "No Good Advice" and "Wake Me Up", and unreleased tracks, including a cover of "Sacred Trust", originally released in 2001 by the Bee Gees and in 2002 by fellow Popstars: The Rivals contestants One True Voice. The bonus disc was also going to include a cover of Chris Isaak's "Wicked Game", however, the track did not make onto the final track listing. The recording later appeared as a bonus track on the 20th anniversary reissue of What Will the Neighbours Say?.

The standard version of the compilation album was released the following week, on 30 October. The regular track listing includes three new tracks: "Something Kinda Ooooh", "Money" and a cover of Tommy James and the Shondells's 1967 single "I Think We're Alone Now". Originally, a cover of "What A Feeling" from the film Flashdance was included on the track list instead of "I Think We're Alone Now", but Girls Aloud contacted the record label three days before the album was manufactured to say they would rather record the Tommy James and the Shondells song. The group recorded the song the following morning and the album was mastered three days later. Apart from the new tracks, the album contains twelve of the group's previous singles, two of which reached number one in the UK: "Sound of the Underground" and "I'll Stand by You".

According to Irish bandmate Nadine Coyle, the first draft of the artwork included only the Union Jack, but she demanded the addition of the flag of Ireland. However, the flag appears backwards on the cover, resembling the flag of the Ivory Coast.

== Critical reception ==
Professional ratings
Review scores
Source	Rating
AllMusic	4/5 stars
The Guardian	4/5 stars
musicOMH	4/5 stars
Pitchfork	8.5/10
Stylus	A
The Times	4/5 stars

The Sound of Girls Aloud received positive reviews from critics. Talia Kraines of BBC Music called the album "a journey through the most exciting and daring pop music of recent times" and went on to add that "this reality band has surpassed all expectations," while Paul Scott of Stylus Magazine described it as "an irreverent party through the last 30 odd years of pop, taking inspiration from the most unexpected of places" and hailed Girls Aloud as "the finest singles band Britain [sic] has produced this decade." AllMusic reviewer Andy Kellman noted the album for making "an ideal introduction" to the group, and said that the three new songs would most likely "keep the group's remarkable streak of dominance afloat." Dan Cairns of The Times gave the album 4 out of 5 stars, stating that Girls Aloud's personality flows "through unimpeachable, sugar-rush pop singles" such as "Something Kinda Ooooh", "The Show" and "Sound of the Underground".

Pitchfork critic Tim Finney described the album as "a whirlwind trip through bizarre but lovable pop gadgetry that may leave the uninitiated reeling." He complimented the songs' "deathless hooks and multi-genre pyrotechnics" and noted that they are diverse, varying from different genres while embracing "elements of electroclash, big beat, and even skiffle." Leonie Cooper of The Guardian characterised the album as "slick ... near-faultless high-octane pop all the way"; however, she felt that the ballads were not really necessary, as "Girls Aloud sound far more exciting when they're simply having fun". In 2007, The Guardian included the greatest hits collection in their list of "1000 albums to hear before you die". Dorian Lynskey wrote, "Years from now, when someone wants to know how bold and brilliant mainstream British pop could get in the noughties, play them this."

== Commercial performance ==
The Sound of Girls Aloud became Girls Aloud's first album to debut at number one in the United Kingdom, and stayed on the UK Albums Chart for a total of 38 weeks. On 24 November 2007, Mark Sutherland of Billboard reported that the album had already sold a total of 767,000 units in the country. On the week ending 2 November 2006, the album debuted at number 13 on the Irish Albums Chart, rising to a new peak of number nine the following week. It was certified Platinum by the Irish Recorded Music Association, denoting shipments of 15,000 units in the country alone. On 29 January 2009, the International Federation of the Phonographic Industry (IFPI) recognised The Sound of Girls Aloud as one of the nine albums that year to sell at least 1 million units in Europe. As of 21 March 2013, the album has sold over 1,2 million units in Europe.

== Promotion ==
=== Singles ===
"Something Kinda Ooooh" was released on 16 October 2006 as the lead single from The Sound of Girls Aloud, one week prior to the album's release. The track debuted at number five on the UK singles chart on download sales alone, before reaching its peak position at number three on the week ending 4 November 2006. The accompanying music video was directed by Stuart Gosling and produced by Jon Adams, and features the group "singing and dancing glamorously". "I Think We're Alone Now" was chosen as the second and final single from the album, being released on 18 December. The song peaked at number four on the UK singles chart during Christmas week. The music video was directed by Alex Hemming and Nick Collett, and portrays Girls Aloud in an attempt to rob a Las Vegas casino.

=== Tour ===
In 2007, Girls Aloud went on The Greatest Hits Tour to further promote the album. The announcement of the tour and the recording of their fourth studio album helped to stop rumours that the band were splitting up, which had surfaced due to the release of their greatest hits album. The show received mixed reviews from music critics, with Dave Simpson of The Guardian saying that the group "fare best when they are playing their own songs."

== Track listing ==
All tracks were produced by Xenomania. Credits adapted from the liner notes of The Sound of Girls Aloud: The Greatest Hits.

Standard edition
No.	Title	Writer(s)	Album	Length
1.	"Sound of the Underground"	Miranda Cooper; Brian Higgins; Niara Scarlett; Xenomania	Sound of the Underground, 2003	3:41
2.	"Love Machine"	Cooper; Higgins; Tim Powell; Nick Coler; Lisa Cowling; Myra Boyle; Shawn Lee	What Will the Neighbours Say?, 2004	3:25
3.	"Biology"	Cooper; Higgins; Powell; Cowling; Giselle Sommerville	Chemistry, 2005	3:35
4.	"No Good Advice"	Cooper; Higgins; Coler; Cowling; Lene Nystrøm	Sound of the Underground	3:48
5.	"I'll Stand by You"	Chrissie Hynde; Tom Kelly; Billy Steinberg	What Will the Neighbours Say?	3:43
6.	"Jump"	Steve Mitchell; Marti Sharron; Gary Skardina	Sound of the Underground (re-issue) and What Will the Neighbours Say?	3:39
7.	"The Show"	Cooper; Higgins; Powell; Cowling; Jon Shave	What Will the Neighbours Say?	3:36
8.	"See the Day"	Dee C. Lee	Chemistry	4:04
9.	"Wake Me Up"	Cooper; Higgins; Powell; Cowling; Lee; Paul Woods; Yusra Maru'e	What Will the Neighbours Say?	3:27
10.	"Life Got Cold"	Cooper; Higgins; Coler; Cowling; Noel Gallagher	Sound of the Underground	3:57
11.	"Something Kinda Ooooh"	Cooper; Higgins; Powell; Coler; Sommerville; Jody Lei	Previously unreleased, 2006	3:22
12.	"Whole Lotta History" (original Ash Howes mix)	Cooper; Higgins; Cowling; Sommerville; Tim "Rolf" Larcombe; Xenomania	Chemistry	3:47
13.	"Long Hot Summer"	Cooper; Higgins; Sommerville; Boyle; Lee; Larcombe	Chemistry	3:52
14.	"Money"	Cooper; Higgins; Powell; Coler; Cowling	Previously unreleased, 2006	4:13
15.	"I Think We're Alone Now"	Ritchie Cordell	Previously unreleased, 2006	3:18
Total length:				56:01

Digital bonus track
No.	Title	Writer(s)	Length
16.	"Biology" (live at Wembley, Chemistry Tour 2006)	Cooper; Higgins; Powell; Cowling; Sommerville	5:18

Limited edition bonus disc
No.	Title	Writer(s)	Length
1.	"No Good Advice" (explicit version)	Cooper; Higgins; Coler; Cowling; Nystrøm	3:48
2.	"Wake Me Up" (alternate version)	Cooper; Higgins; Powell; Cowling; Lee; Woods; Maru'e	3:27
3.	"I Predict a Riot" (live at Wembley, Chemistry Tour 2006)	Ricky Wilson; Andrew White; Simon Rix; Nick Baines; Nick Hodgson	4:40
4.	"Sound of the Underground" (instrumental breakdown mix)	Cooper; Higgins; Scarlett; Xenomania	3:35
5.	"Hanging on the Telephone"	Jack Lee	2:39
6.	"Loving Is Easy"	Girls Aloud; Cooper; Higgins; Coler; Cowling; Lee	3:01
7.	"Singapore"	Cooper; Higgins; Cowling; Shave	3:00
8.	"Sacred Trust"	Barry Gibb; Maurice Gibb; Robin Gibb	5:01

== Personnel ==
Credits adapted from AllMusic.

- Dick Beetham – mastering
- Greg Bone – guitar
- Myra Boyle – composer
- Jack Clark – engineer
- Nick Coler – bass, composer, guitar, keyboard programming, keyboards, programming
- Miranda Cooper – composer, programming
- Lisa Cowling – composer
- Girls Aloud – primary artist
- Matt Gray – keyboards, programming
- Brian Higgins – composer, keyboards, mixing, producer, programming
- Ash Howes – mixing
- Chrissie Hynde – composer
- Tom Kelly – composer
- Tim "Rolf" Larcombe – composer, guitar, keyboards, programming
- Shawn Lee – composer, drums, guitar, guitar (bass)
- Steve Mitchell – composer
- Yoad Nevo – programming
- Lene Grawford Nystrøm – composer
- Tim Powell – composer, keyboards, mixing, programming
- Peter Manning Robinson – liner notes
- Niara Scarlett – composer
- Toby Scott – keyboards
- Marti Sharron – composer
- Jon Shave – composer, keyboards, production assistant, programming
- Giselle Sommerville – composer
- Billy Steinberg – composer
- Matt Tait – mixing
- Will Thom – photography
- Jeremy Wheatley – mixing, producer
- Andy Wood – bass
- Paul Woods – composer, programming
- Xenomania – composer

== Charts ==
=== Weekly charts ===
Chart (2006)	Peak position
Irish Albums (IRMA)	9
Scottish Albums (OCC)	1
UK Albums (OCC)	1

=== Year-end charts ===
Chart (2006)	Position
UK Albums (OCC)	16

Chart (2009)	Position
UK Albums (OCC)	72

== Certifications ==
Region	Certification	Certified units/sales
Ireland (IRMA)	Platinum	15,000^{^}
United Kingdom (BPI)	4× Platinum	1,200,000
Summaries
Europe (IFPI)	Platinum	1,000,000^{*}
^{*} Sales figures based on certification alone.^{^} Shipments figures based on certification alone.

== Release history ==
Country	Date	Format	Label
United Kingdom	23 October 2006	CD – limited edition	Universal Music
United Kingdom	30 October 2006	CD – standard edition	Universal Music
United States	26 June 2007	Digital download	Polydor Records
