= Girls Aloud: Home Truths =

- Directed by: Stewart Manning
- Starring: Girls Aloud
- Original language: English

Production
- Producer: Mark Doyle
- Running time: 60 minutes

Original release
- Network: ITV2
- Release: 12 October 2005

Girls Aloud: Home Truths is a fly on the wall style documentary film that was broadcast as a prelude to the group's first full-length documentary series, Girls Aloud: Off the Record. The programme was first broadcast on 12 October 2005 on ITV2.

== Content ==
Filming took place from March to September 2005. The documentary features the group discussing the success and impact of Girls Aloud so far, spending time with family and friends at home, performances and backstage footage from their What Will the Neighbours Say? Live tour, behind the scenes filming the music video for "Long Hot Summer", recording their third studio album, Chemistry.

The show pulled in nearly 267,000 viewers, which was a 1.6% share of the audience for that night.
