= Get Girls Aloud's Style =

Video by Girls Aloud
- Released: November 12, 2007
- Genre: Pop
- Label: Fascination

Girls Aloud chronology
Girls Aloud: Greatest Hits Live From Wembley Arena (2006)	Get Girls Aloud's Style (2007)	Tangled Up: Live From The O2 (2008)

Get Girls Aloud's Style is the fifth DVD featuring Girls Aloud, was released on November 12, 2007. It features commentary from Girls Aloud on all of their favourite and least favourite outfits from their careers, as well as fashion tips. The video contains the group's first sixteen music videos, from "Sound of the Underground" up to "Sexy! No No No...". The video for "Call the Shots", despite having premiered on 17 October 2007, was not included on this release.

== Content ==
- Commentary on previously released music videos and artworks
- Cheryl's make-up secrets
- Nadine talks shoes
- Kimberley on internet shopping
- Nicola's tips for perfect jeans
- Sarah on accessories
- Music videos (with optional commentary from Cheryl and Sarah):
1. "Sound of the Underground"
2. "No Good Advice"
3. "Life Got Cold"
4. "Jump"
5. "The Show"
6. "Love Machine"
7. "I'll Stand by You"
8. "Wake Me Up"
9. "Long Hot Summer"
10. "Biology"
11. "See the Day"
12. "Whole Lotta History"
13. "Something Kinda Ooooh"
14. "I Think We're Alone Now"
15. "Walk This Way" (with Sugababes)
16. "Sexy! No No No..."

== Chart ==
Chart (2007)	Peak Position
UK Music DVD Chart	11
