= The Greatest Hits Tour (Girls Aloud) =

2007 concert tour by Girls Aloud

- Tour by Girls Aloud
- Cover of the tour programme
- Associated album: The Sound of Girls Aloud
- Start date: 14 May 2007
- End date: 1 September 2007
- Legs: 2
- No. of shows: 22

Girls Aloud concert chronology
- Chemistry: The Tour (2006); The Greatest Hits Tour (2007); Tangled Up Tour (2008)

The Greatest Hits Tour was the third concert tour by Irish and British girl group Girls Aloud, in support of their first greatest hits album The Sound of Girls Aloud: The Greatest Hits. Girls Aloud returned to Northern Ireland and Ireland, having not performed there on 2006's Chemistry Tour. The band performed sixteen dates in various arenas across the United Kingdom and Ireland, making it their second arena tour. The Greatest Hits Tour kicked off in Cheryl's hometown of Newcastle on 14 May 2007 and concluding in near Nadine Coyle's home in Belfast on 2 June 2007. Girls Aloud also performed seven open-air concerts over the summer.

The show was divided into five unique sections with distinct costumes, including the encore. Girls Aloud descended onto the stage from the ceiling as they performed "Something Kinda Ooooh". They performed fourteen of the fifteen singles they had released at the time, as well as a couple of album tracks and a Dirty Dancing medley. A number of songs were also remixed or reworked.

The tour received mixed reviews from contemporary music critics, who praised Girls Aloud's original songs but criticized the number of cover versions and the show's lack of budget. Critics also noted Girls Aloud's provocative attire. Much like the greatest hits album, The Greatest Hits Tour was a commercial success. The Greatest Hits Tour remains Girls Aloud's only tour not to receive a video release.

== Background and development ==
The initial tour dates were announced on 10 November 2006, although pre-sale started two days earlier. Due to the demand, extra dates in Newcastle and Glasgow and a date in Aberdeen were added. The group made a return to both Northern Ireland and Ireland, after failing to perform in either country on the Chemistry Tour. The announcement of the tour, the recording of their fourth studio album and an accompanying tour for the following year helped to stop rumours that the band were splitting up, which had surfaced due to the release of their greatest hits album.

Girls Aloud also performed festival and summer open air dates at Liverpool Summer Pops and T4 on the Beach.

== Concert synopsis ==
The show began with the dancers wearing military style outfits performing a choreography routine before Girls Aloud lower down to the stage, wearing black leather police costumes and open the show with "Something Kinda Ooooh". They reach the actual stage after Cheryl's opening verse is repeated, and the first chorus. This is then followed by "Wake Me Up", before they welcome the audience to the show. Their 2007 Comic Relief single "Walk This Way", sees a battle between Girls Aloud and the dancers, both teams remaining on each side of the stage, opposite to each other. The first section is then complete with a performance of "Jump" which has an extended outro as they girls and dancers lower off the stage at the top of the staircase.

After the costume change interlude is over, Girls Aloud return to the stage wearing summer style tops with shorts, hot pants or skirts and commence the concert with their second single "No Good Advice". "Long Hot Summer" sees the girls dance the routine holding fans. "Whole Lotta History" has them suspended above the stage sat on the platform used for their entrance, but covered with a pink sheet. Once back on the stage, they perform a Medledy of songs from the film Dirty Dancing. Sarah Harding and Nadine Coyle take lead in "Do You Love Me?". Kimberley Walsh sings "She's Like The Wind" with Nicola Roberts as back up, and Cheryl and Nicola Roberts take lead vocals in "(I've Had) The Time of my Life". The girls do the signature lift from the movie during "Time Of My Life". This ends the summer-themed second act.

The 3rd section takes a gangsta theme and the girls return to the stage wearing black & white gangsta suits, singing their #1 debut single "Sound Of The Underground", performing the signature choreography with microphone stands. This is then followed by a reggae remix of "Life Got Cold" as the girls sit on the staircase. They perform two songs from their What Will The Neighbours Say? album: "Graffiti My Soul", which has choreography performed with black canes and "Real Life".

The penultimate section of the concert takes a cabaret theme as the girls return to the stage wearing cabaret dresses and sing their single "I Think We're Alone Now" which received a Big Band remix. They perform "I'll Stand By You" at the top of the staircase rotating on a large circular platform. The album track "Money" is then performed followed by "Love Machine", which featured a dance break. Cheryl shouts STOP! and everyone else on stage freezes as Cheryl walks to a bar placed on stage, drinks some alcohol, belches, returns to her place and then restarts the song. Girls Aloud then say goodbye, implying that the concert is over.

The encore begins with Girls Aloud lying in beds to commence the concert with "The Show". The base of the beds on one side is hollow which hides the dancers until they are revealed by Girls Aloud pulling back the sheets and the dancers sitting up. Girls Aloud wore purple silk dressing gowns with black ties, which are taken off to reveal black dresses with purple belts. The concert is then completed by an extended version of "Biology" before Girls Aloud say goodbye and leave the stage.

== Opening acts ==
- Rogue Traders
- Natalia
- Misha Williams

== Setlist ==
The following set list is representative of the shows in May 2007. It is not representative of all concerts for the duration of the tour.

1. "Something Kinda Ooooh"
2. "Wake Me Up"
3. "Walk This Way"
4. "Jump"
5. "No Good Advice"
6. "Long Hot Summer"
7. "Whole Lotta History"
8. Medley: "Do You Love Me"/"She's Like the Wind"/"(I've Had) The Time of My Life"
9. "Sound of the Underground
10. "Life Got Cold"
11. "Graffiti My Soul"
12. "Real Life"
13. "I Think We're Alone Now"
14. "Money"
15. "I'll Stand by You"
16. "Love Machine"
17. "The Show"
18. "Biology"

== Tour dates ==
| Date | City | Country | Venue |
Leg 1 – Indoor arenas
| 14 May 2007 | Newcastle | England | Metro Radio Arena |
| 15 May 2007 | Aberdeen | Scotland | Press & Journal Arena |
| 16 May 2007 | Glasgow | Scotland | Scottish Exhibition and Conference Centre |
| 18 May 2007 | Newcastle | England | Metro Radio Arena |
| 19 May 2007 | Glasgow | Scotland | Scottish Exhibition and Conference Centre |
| 20 May 2007 | Manchester | England | Manchester Evening News Arena |
| 22 May 2007 | Sheffield | England | Sheffield Arena |
| 23 May 2007 | Cardiff | Wales | Cardiff International Arena |
| 25 May 2007 | Birmingham | England | National Indoor Arena |
| 26 May 2007 | London | England | Wembley Arena |
| 27 May 2007 | Nottingham | England | Trent FM Arena Nottingham |
| 29 May 2007 | Brighton | England | Brighton Centre |
| 30 May 2007 | Bournemouth | England | Windsor Hall |
| 1 June 2007 | Dublin | Ireland | Point Theatre |
| 2 June 2007 | Belfast | Northern Ireland | Odyssey Arena |
Leg 2 – Open air festivals
| 3 July 2007 | Liverpool | England | Liverpool Summer Pops |
| 7 July 2007 | Beaulieu | England | National Motor Museum |
| 21 July 2007 | Narberth | Wales | Oakwood Theme Park |
| 24 August 2007 | Vaynol | Wales | Faenol Festival |
| 27 August 2007 | Arundel | England | Arundel Castle |
| 31 August 2007 | Holkham | England | Holkham Hall |
| 1 September 2007 | Skegness | England | Fantasy Island |

== Critical response ==
The show received generally favorable reviews from music critics. Dave Simpson of The Guardian gave the show three stars out of five. He chastised the covers, saying Girls Aloud "fare best when they are playing their own songs." Lisa Verrico of The Times also awarded the concert three stars out of five and shared a similar point of view to Simpson. She wrote, "The band's smartest, sassiest, least conventional songs struggled to ignite the Newcastle crowd, while tacky covers and tawdry ballads went down a storm." Verrico also felt "big idea after big idea was let down by its budget."

Girls Aloud's provocative attire received attention. "They are wearing the shortest shorts in pop", wrote The Guardian's Simpson. "There are also eye-watering glittery dresses, vaguely S&M leather get-ups and gangster's moll clobber for a fabulous Sound of the Underground."
