= Whole Lotta History =

2006 single by Girls Aloud

Single by Girls Aloud

from the album Chemistry
- B-side: "Crazy Fool"; "Teenage Dirtbag" (live)
- Released: 13 March 2006
- Genre: Pop
- Length: 3:47
- Label: Polydor
- Songwriters: Miranda Cooper; Brian Higgins; Tim "Rolf" Larcombe; Lisa Cowling; Giselle Sommerville; James Brian Alexander; Paul Robert Woods
- Producers: Brian Higgins; Xenomania

Girls Aloud singles chronology
| "See the Day" (2005) | "Whole Lotta History" (2006) | "Something Kinda Ooooh" (2006) |

Audio sample
- file; help

Music video
- "Whole Lotta History" on YouTube

Alternative cover
- UK CD 2 cover

"Whole Lotta History" is a song by British-Irish girl group Girls Aloud, from their third studio album Chemistry (2005). The song was written by Miranda Cooper, Brian Higgins and his production team Xenomania, and produced by Higgins and Xenomania. "Whole Lotta History" was slightly remixed and released as the fourth and final single from Chemistry on 13 March 2006. It peaked at number six on the UK Singles Chart, becoming their twelfth consecutive top ten single.

The music video was filmed in Paris, France and features Girls Aloud reminiscing about a former love. "Whole Lotta History" was promoted through numerous live appearances and has since been performed on three of the group's concert tours. Receiving comparisons to 1990s girl groups Spice Girls and All Saints, "Whole Lotta History" received generally favourable reviews from music critics.

== Background and composition ==
"Whole Lotta History" is written in the key of F# major. Despite sounding more traditional than most Girls Aloud songs, "Whole Lotta History" is made up of seven different parts rather than following a verse-chorus formula. The song begins with a two-part introduction (part one sung by Kimberley Walsh, part two sung by Cheryl Cole), a verse (sung by Cole), and a pre-chorus (sung by Nadine Coyle) before reaching its chorus. The song then continues with a different verse (sung by Nicola Roberts) and a middle-eight (sung by Coyle). Following a repetition of the chorus, the song ends with a "wistful" conclusion sung by Sarah Harding.

== Release ==
"Whole Lotta History" was slightly remixed for the single release. The single version, known as the Original Ash Howes Mix, differs slightly from the album version found on Chemistry; it has different percussion, a more pronounced guitar, and faint strings during the chorus. "Whole Lotta History" was Girls Aloud's first original ballad to be released as a single since 2003's "Life Got Cold". Shortly before the release of the single, Girls Aloud spent a week in Australia to promote "Biology" there.

Released on 13 March 2006, the single was made available on two CD single formats and as a digital download. The first disc includes a previously unreleased track entitled "Crazy Fool", which was co-written by Girls Aloud and sung solely by Cheryl Tweedy. The song and its "pulsating electro backbeat" were praised by Peter Robinson of Popjustice. The second disc included the Whole Lotta Lamezma Mix of "Whole Lotta History", as well as Girls Aloud's live cover of Wheatus' "Teenage Dirtbag". A studio version was later released on Radio 1 Established 1967. An acoustic version of "Whole Lotta History" was also available as a digital download.

== Critical reception ==
"Whole Lotta History" received generally favourable reviews from most music critics. Virgin Media stated that while Girls Aloud "do so much better when they shift into uptempo gear", the song is "one of the Girls' better efforts [at ballads] – not quite as saccharine as I'll Stand By You and a good deal more engaging than the turgid See The Day."

The song received comparisons to ballads by 1990s girl groups Spice Girls and All Saints. BBC Music called it "a lush ballad reminiscent of the Spice Girls". A reporter for The Irish Times compared the song to "a sub-Spice Girls Christmas No 1", while an AllMusic reviewer compared it to "2 Become 1" specifically. John Murphy of musicOMH described the song as "the best lovelorn ballad since All Saints' Never Ever."

== Chart performance ==
Although the physical single was not released, "Whole Lotta History" was eligible to enter the UK Singles Chart on 13 March 2006, due to new chart rules allowing singles to enter the charts on the Sunday before its physical release based on download sales only (the download was released the week before). "Whole Lotta History" debuted at number eighty, before peaking at number six the following week. This made the song Girls Aloud's twelfth consecutive top ten single, although it only spent a mere five weeks in the top 75. "Whole Lotta History" also charted at number twenty-three on the UK Download Chart. The single was the 188th best seller of 2006, with sales over 37,000. In Ireland, the song debuted at number eighteen on the Irish Singles Chart and spent a total of six weeks in the top fifty.

== Music video ==
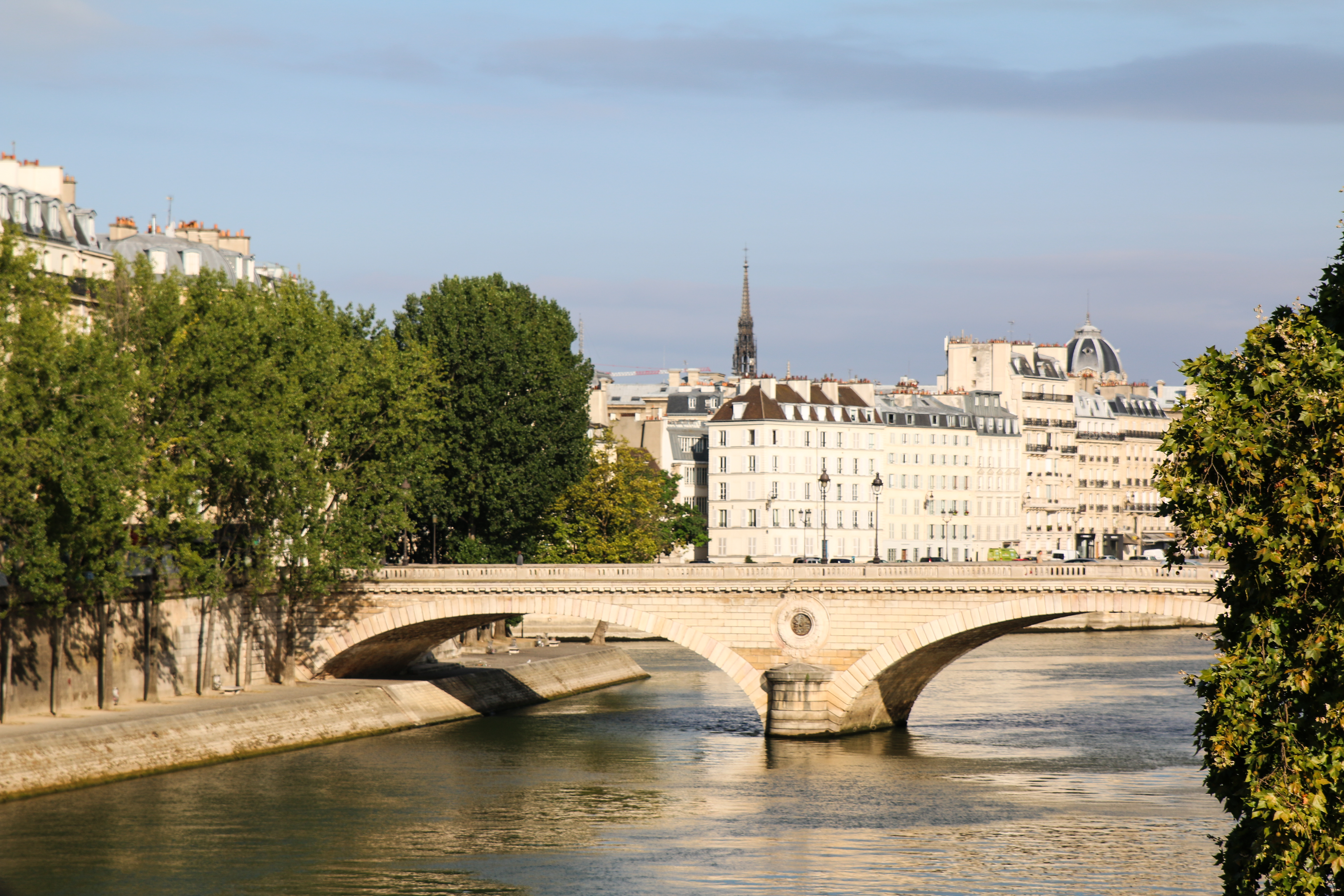
Portions of the music video for "Whole Lotta History" were filmed near Pont Louis-Philippe in Paris.

a music video for "Whole Lotta History" was directed by Margaret Malandruccolo. Filmed in Paris, France, the video was Girls Aloud's first to be shot outside of the United Kingdom. The music video was included on the DVD release of 2006's Chemistry Tour, as well as 2007's Style DVD. Behind the scenes footage was shown in the second episode of the group's reality show Girls Aloud: Off the Record.

The video depicts each member of the band in a different setting reminiscing about a former love, as the lyrics suggest. Kimberley Walsh receives flowers inside of a café and apparently looks at her past boyfriend. Cheryl is in an unruly hotel room, looking out of a window onto a street. Nadine Coyle looks through a photo album at a desk in a study, while Nicola Roberts looks at herself in a mirror. Sarah Harding walks alone along the Seine near the Pont Louis-Philippe bridge as couples pass by. The group shot consists of all members sitting together in a lounge (in the room Nadine's section takes place) laughing and discussing past relationships.

== Live performances ==
Girls Aloud performed "Whole Lotta History" live for the first time on CD:UK on 18 February 2006. They also appeared on morning talk shows Davina, GMTV, and Loose Women, as well as the Saturday morning children's show Ministry of Mayhem. Additionally, they performed on Top of the Pops and its spin-off show Top of the Pops Reloaded. During the group's promotional trip to Australia, Girls Aloud performed the song on whatUwant.

Since its release, Girls Aloud have included the song on four of their concert tours. It was initially featured on 2006's Chemistry Tour. The following year, during The Greatest Hits Tour, they performed the song from "a pink cushion-covered swing." It was part of a ballad section on 2008's Tangled Up Tour, sung by Girls Aloud as they walk down a catwalk which reached the middle of the venue. It was omitted from 2009's Out of Control Tour but it was included in the setlists of 2013's Ten: The Hits Tour and 2024's The Girls Aloud Show which included an extended outro of Sarah's closing lines playing on loop, with clips of the late singer showing on the huge screens while the girls departed the stage for a costume change.

== Track listings and formats ==
UK CD1 (9877402)

1. "Whole Lotta History" (Original Ash Howes Mix) – 3:47
2. "Crazy Fool" (Girls Aloud, Cooper, Higgins, Jon Shave) – 3:34

UK CD2 (9877403)

1. "Whole Lotta History" (Original Ash Howes Mix) – 3:47
2. "Whole Lotta History" (Whole Lotta Lamezma Mix) – 5:09
3. "Teenage Dirtbag" (Live at Carling Academy) (Wheatus) – 4:14
4. "Whole Lotta History" (video) – 3:47
5. "Whole Lotta History" (karaoke video) – 3:47
6. "Whole Lotta History" (game)

UK 7digital exclusive download

1. "Whole Lotta History" (Acoustic Version) – 3:52

The Singles Boxset (CD12)

1. "Whole Lotta History" (Original Ash Howes Mix) – 3:47
2. "Crazy Fool" – 3:34
3. "Whole Lotta History" (Whole Lotta Lamezma Mix) – 5:09
4. "Teenage Dirtbag" (Live at Carling Academy) – 4:14
5. "Whole Lotta History" (Acoustic Version) – 3:52
6. "Whole Lotta History" (video) – 3:47
7. "Whole Lotta History" (karaoke video) – 3:47
8. "Whole Lotta History" (game)

Digital EP

1. "Whole Lotta History" (Ash Howes mix) – 3:47
2. "Crazy Fool" – 3:34
3. "Whole Lotta History" (Whole Lotta Lamezma Mix) – 5:09
4. "Teenage Dirtbag" (Live At The Carling Academy, London) – 4:17
5. "Whole Lotta History" (Acoustic) – 3:51

== Credits and personnel ==
- Bass: Shawn Lee
- Guitar: Nick Coler, Shawn Lee, Tim Powell
- Keyboards: Brian Higgins, Tim Powell
- Mastering: Dick Beetham for 360 Mastering
- Mixing: Tim Powell, Jeremy Wheatley
- Production: Brian Higgins, Xenomania
- Programming: Brian Higgins, Tim "Rolf" Larcombe, Tim Powell
- Songwriting: Miranda Cooper, Brian Higgins, Lisa Cowling, Tim "Rolf" Larcombe, Giselle Sommerville
- Vocals: Girls Aloud
- Published by Warner/Chappell Music and Xenomania Music

== Charts ==
Weekly chart performance for "Whole Lotta History"
| Chart (2006) | Peak position |
|---|---|
| Ireland (IRMA) | 18 |
| Scottish Singles Sales (Official Charts) | 2 |
| UK Singles (Official Charts) | 6 |

=== Year-end chart ===
Year-end chart performance for "Whole Lotta History"
| Chart (2006) | Position |
|---|---|
| UK Singles (OCC) | 188 |
