= Chemistry (Girls Aloud album) =

2005 studio album by Girls Aloud

Studio album by Girls Aloud
- Released: 5 December 2005
- Recorded: 2005
- Studios: London, England
- Genres: Dance-pop; pop rock; progressive pop
- Length: 44:38
- Label: Polydor
- Producers: Brian Higgins; Xenomania

Girls Aloud chronology
What Will the Neighbours Say? (2004)	Chemistry (2005)	The Sound of Girls Aloud: The Greatest Hits (2006)

Alternative cover
- Christmas edition artwork

Singles from Chemistry
- 1. "Long Hot Summer" Released: 22 August 2005; 2. "Biology" Released: 14 November 2005; 3. "See the Day" Released: 19 December 2005; 4. "Whole Lotta History" Released: 13 March 2006

Singles from Chemistry (Australian edition)
- 1. "Biology" Released: 20 February 2006; 2. "The Show" Released: 12 July 2006; 3. "I'll Stand by You" Released: 9 September 2006

Chemistry is the third studio album by English-Irish girl group Girls Aloud. It was released in the United Kingdom on 5 December 2005 by Polydor Records. After the success of What Will the Neighbours Say?, the album was again entirely produced by Brian Higgins and his production team Xenomania. Chemistry is a loose concept album which details celebrity lifestyle and "what it's like to be a twentysomething girl in London." A number of the songs avert the verse-chorus form typical of pop music.

Chemistry received widespread acclaim from many contemporary music critics upon its release. Despite a relatively low chart position (peaking at 11, the lowest charting release by the group), the album yielded four top ten singles and was certified platinum in both the United Kingdom and Ireland, selling over 390,000 copies combined between the 2 countries. The album was followed by the Chemistry Tour, which had Girls Aloud performing in arenas for the first time.

For the album's 20th anniversary, it was reissued in September 2025 in three formats: a pink vinyl LP, a picture disc vinyl LP, and a three-CD deluxe edition, as well as a digital download and on streaming. The non-vinyl editions feature the original UK album along with remixes, alternative cuts, new alternative mixes, rarities, and two previously unreleased tracks: "Naked in the Shower" and "You Go Too Fast (Demo)".

== Conception ==
After the success of What Will the Neighbours Say?, which was solely produced by Brian Higgins and Xenomania, the production team was asked to create Girls Aloud's third studio album. Chemistry was entirely produced and written by Xenomania, apart from a cover of Dee C. Lee's "See the Day." The album was recorded in 2005, following the What Will the Neighbours Say...? Tour. Parts of the process were shown in the fly on the wall documentary Girls Aloud: Home Truths.

== Music ==
=== Style and lyrics ===
Chemistry explores a more innovative approach to pop music, straying from the typical verse–chorus form present in most songs. Alexis Petridis of The Guardian wrote that Chemistry is "a record that dispenses with the tiresome business of verses and instead opts for songs apparently constructed by stitching eight different choruses together." BBC Music exclaimed that Girls Aloud "have resuscitated its corpse by wedding chart-friendly melodies to experimental avant-garde sounds". The album takes influences from a wide variety of sources, including "everything from French chanson to piano-pounding blues to the clipped R&B of the Small Faces". Rapping in the same vein as artists like Betty Boo and Neneh Cherry is prominent. Guitars are present for most of the album. Yahoo! Music says "there's nary a 'formula' in sight. There are as many sudden tonal and tempo switches as the tricksiest Chicago art rock band. And all but one song here gives guitars a starring role." The songs are noticeably less rooted in electronic music, although "Swinging London Town" is "a dark, squiggly synth pop epic" and "It's Magic" is composed of "little Röyksopp-like keyboard riffs".

The album was described as "a concept album which relates to the girls and what it's like to be a twentysomething girl in London". The Guardian said that the album's "lyrics sound like Blur's Parklife rewritten by the editorial staff of Heat magazine" and "holds a distinctly ambiguous mirror up to noughties celebrity." Girls Aloud came under fire for the album's allegedly "dirty lyrics". "I'm surprised that some of our lyrics have caused a stir. We're just having a laugh, and a lot of the songs are very tongue in cheek," commented Kimberley Walsh on the matter. Sarah Harding said that songs like "Racy Lacey", which "lampoons promiscuous females", are "observational rather than autobiographical." "Models" was also criticised for its use of the word "shit", while "Swinging London Town" allegedly "toys with the girls' reputation for partying a little too heartily." "Watch Me Go", co-written by former 'N Sync member JC Chasez, also "delves into the [...] topic of bondage." Girls Aloud receive a co-writing credit on several songs, namely "Wild Horses", "Waiting" and "It's Magic".

=== Songs ===
The album opens with "Intro", a 42-second introduction, The end of "Intro" segues into the first full track on the album, "Models". The song "deals with men who try to assert their masculinity by sleeping with cover girls", but contains a "council estate girls made good" sub-text. It received comparisons to Duran Duran's "Girls on Film" (which Girls Aloud once covered) and Madonna's "Material Girl". One reviewer called "Biology" "the most faithful to this album's spirit of innovation, blending the kind of saucy cabaret you'd expect to find in a gin-soaked saloon bar with a glorious chorus of fizzing, gliding synths and deceptively breakneck beats." "Wild Horses", track four on the album, "features a mock choirgirl intro segueing into a breezy acoustic-rocker [...] like a harder St Etienne." It was also described as "a futuristic country & western club banger". The song is followed by "See the Day", a cover of the 1985 Dee C. Lee single which has been "given a glossy 21st century refurb". The version, described as "the obligatory Christmas ballad", was largely slated for its lack of creativity and similarities to their 2004 cover of the Pretenders' "I'll Stand By You" (although some critics preferred it).

"Watch Me Go" was described as "deliciously slutty" and includes rapping similar to Betty Boo and Neneh Cherry. The song's outro was compared to the Black Eyed Peas' "My Humps". It was described by The Observer as "Eighties Boney M funk-pop." "Waiting" was described as a highlight by The Sunday Times. "Whole Lotta History" was called a "lush ballad", and it received comparisons to the Spice Girls' ballads. "Whole Lotta History" has also received comparisons to All Saints' "Never Ever". "Long Hot Summer" was called "effervescent but relatively unexciting", as well as a "well-produced, upbeat pop tune, with a great hook in the chorus" by The Sentinel. The song, like "Watch Me Go", also includes Betty Boo-esque rapping.

"Swinging London Town" received critical praise. It was called "a dark, squiggly synth pop epic a la Pet Shop Boys on the diverse characters – from wannabes to trustafarians – found in the nation's capital", and that there "hasn't been a song since the Pet Shop Boys' 'West End Girls' that captures the ugly charms of London on a Friday night, but 'Swinging London Town' comes close." It was further described as "a collision of warp-speed funk guitar riffs and distorted Giorgio Moroder-style techno-disco that unexpectedly drops into wafting movie-soundtrack ambience." "It's Magic", a Nicola Roberts solo which was called "the album's hidden highlight", was labelled "weighty, sultry electro-pop [...] layered with beautifully enticing synth melodies." "No Regrets", sung solely by Nadine Coyle, is an electro-bossanova ballad. The album's closer, "Racy Lacey", is "a portrait song of a young lady in the style of Prince's "Darling Nikki" or Blur's "Tracy Jacks." The Guardian called it "a kind of nuclear-powered Euro novelty record."

== Release ==
Chemistry was released in Ireland on 2 December 2005 and in the United Kingdom on the following Monday. In addition to the standard edition of the album, a limited edition with a bonus disc was also released. The bonus disc contains Christmas music, including covers and original songs produced by Xenomania under the moniker Randy Snaps. The songwriters also took on Christmas-related pseudonyms. In Australia and New Zealand, the album was released on 20 February 2006; however, it failed to generate much interest. Additionally, Chemistry and other Girls Aloud releases appeared on the US iTunes Store on 26 June 2007.

=== Singles ===
The album's first single was "Long Hot Summer", released in August 2005 as a "buzz" track to regenerate interest in the girls. The song was earmarked for release on the soundtrack of the 2005 film Herbie: Fully Loaded. The plans fell through, but the music video had taken inspiration from the movie's car theme and Girls Aloud portrayed mechanics. The song was not well-received by critics, and it became their first single to miss the top five. The follow-up "Biology" was critically acclaimed and saw Girls Aloud return to the top five. Peter Cashmore, writing for The Guardian, described "Biology" as "the best pop single of the last decade". In September 2006, the single followed in the footsteps of "No Good Advice" and "Wake Me Up" to become the winner of the Popjustice £20 Music Prize. Just four weeks after the release of "Biology", Girls Aloud released a cover of Dee C. Lee's "See the Day" in the race for Christmas number one. It became their lowest charting single at the time. The song won the Heart Award at the O2 Silver Clef Lunch, an annual awards honouring songwriting and performance in aid of Nordoff-Robbins Music Therapy. The final single was "Whole Lotta History", which became their twelfth consecutive single to chart within the top ten. The video, filmed in Paris, France, was their first to be set on location and outside of the United Kingdom. In Australia "Biology" was released as the first single in early 2006 peaking within the top 30. However second single "The Show" flopped peaking within the top 75 resulting in the third intended single, I'll Stand By You to be cancelled despite promotion earlier that year with single "Biology".

== Critical reception ==
Professional ratings
Review scores
Source	Rating
AllMusic	2.5/5 stars
DIY	4.5/5 stars
Entertainment.ie	4/5 stars
The Independent	3/5 stars
The Irish Times	3/5 stars
The Observer	5/5 stars
Stylus Magazine	A−
Virgin Media	5/5 stars
Yahoo! Music	8/10 stars

Chemistry received positive reviews from music critics. Talia Kraines of BBC Music decided that the album was "quirky, modern and dripping with attitude" and "holds no disappointments." Virgin Media gave the album five stars, saying it was "bursting [...] with invention, quirky lyrics, tongue-in-cheek sauciness and [...] appeals to grown-up pop fans and music critics as well as to the teenyboppers." Yahoo! Music concurred by declaring that Chemistry was "as devilish and quirky and downright uplifting as anything else released by anyone this year." The Guardian was extremely positive in its review, saying it "spends 45 minutes doing the last thing you expect it to." The New York Times referred to the album as "endlessly entertaining". In comparison to Girls Aloud's previous albums, Entertainment.ie referred to Chemistry as their "best offering yet [...] overflowing with pop hooks, sassy production and choruses just waiting to take up permanent residence in your head." The Daily Telegraph said that Girls Aloud have "simply got much, much better [...] albums will have to get better in order to survive. It's happened here. Judging by Chemistry, Girls Aloud's songwriters are now working as hard as the band are." MusicOMH said it "achieves the almost impossible in bettering its predecessor." Dom Passantino of Stylus Magazine said he did prefer What Will the Neighbours Say?, but gave Chemistry an A−.

The Sunday Times, on the other hand, only gave Chemistry two and a half stars out of five. AllMusic stated that Girls Aloud's fans were outgrowing them and "the cracks were beginning to show".

Chemistry appeared at number 13 on Stylus Magazine's Top 50 Albums of 2005 and number 35 on Observer Music Monthly's top 100 albums of 2005 list. In 2008, Slant Magazine said that "Chemistry is probably still their crowning glory". In 2009, the album was included in MSN Music's 20 best albums of the decade.

== Commercial performance ==
Chemistry became Girls Aloud's first studio album to miss the top ten of the UK Albums Chart, debuting at number 11 with first-week sales of 81,962 copies. Despite its lower chart position, its initial sales exceeded those of the group's debut album, Sound of the Underground, which had entered the chart at number two in 2003 with 37,077 copies sold. The album remained in the top 75 for seven consecutive weeks, later re-entering the chart for an additional three weeks following the release of its fourth single "Whole Lotta History." It was subsequently certified platinum by the British Phonographic Industry (BPI) on 23 December 2005 for shipments figures in excess of 300,000 units. By March 2013, the album had sold 390,000 copies domestically. Elsewhere, the album debuted at number 34 on the Irish Albums Chart, eventually peaking at number 31 in its fourth week and later receiving a platinum certification from the Irish Recorded Music Association (IRMA).

The twentieth anniversary of Chemistry was celebrated with the release of Chemistry: 20th Anniversary Edition; on 3 October 2025, the album debuted at number 71 on the UK Albums Chart, at number 9 on the UK Physical Albums Chart, number 70 on the UK Albums Downloads Chart, and at number 8 on the UK Vinyl Albums Chart.

== Track listing ==
All tracks were produced by Brian Higgins and Xenomania.

Standard edition
No.	Title	Writer(s)	Length
1.	"Intro"	Xenomania	0:42
2.	"Models"	Miranda Cooper; Brian Higgins; Tim Powell; Nick Coler; Lisa Cowling; Myra Boyle	3:28
3.	"Biology (Note: "Biology" contains a sample of The Animals' song "Club A-Gogo".)"	Cooper; Higgins; Powell; Cowling; Giselle Sommerville	3:35
4.	"Wild Horses"	Cooper; Higgins; Coler; Cowling; Boyle; Shawn Lee; Girls Aloud	3:23
5.	"See the Day"	Dee C. Lee	4:04
6.	"Watch Me Go"	Cooper; Higgins; Powell; Cowling; S. Lee; JC Chasez	4:05
7.	"Waiting"	Cooper; Higgins; Cowling; S. Lee; Paul Woods; Tim "Rolf" Larcombe; Girls Aloud	4:13
8.	"Whole Lotta History"	Cooper; Higgins; Cowling; Sommervile; Larcombe; Xenomania	3:47
9.	"Long Hot Summer"	Cooper; Higgins; Sommerville; Boyle; S. Lee; Larcombe	3:52
10.	"Swinging London Town"	Cooper; Higgins; Powell; Matt Gray	4:02
11.	"It's Magic (Note: "It's Magic" is performed by Nicola Roberts solo but credited to Girls Aloud.)"	Girls Aloud; Cooper; Higgins; Powell	3:22

UK bonus tracks
No.	Title	Writer(s)	Length
12.	"No Regrets (Note: "No Regrets" is performed by Nadine Coyle solo but credited to Girls Aloud.)"	Cooper; Higgins; Gray	3:21
13.	"Racy Lacey"	Cooper; Higgins; Gray	3:06
Total length:			44:38

International edition bonus tracks
No.	Title	Writer(s)	Length
6.	"The Show"	Cooper; Higgins; Powell; Cowling; Jon Shave	3:36
13.	"I'll Stand by You"	Chrissie Hynde; Tom Kelly; Billy Steinberg	3:43
Total length:			44:01

Christmas bonus disc
No.	Title	Writer(s)	Length
1.	"I Wish It Could Be Christmas Everyday"	Roy Wood	3:59
2.	"I Wanna Kiss You So (Christmas in a Nutshell)"	Cooper (Note: Cooper is credited on the Christmas bonus disc as "Holly Bush".); Higgins (Note: Higgins is credited on the Christmas bonus disc as "S. Claws".); S. Lee (Note: Lee is credited on the Christmas bonus disc as "Henry Mistletoe".); Cowling (Note: Cowling is credited on the Christmas bonus disc as "Beth Lehem".); Coler (Note: Coler is credited on the Christmas bonus disc as "Festiv Gifts".)	3:38
3.	"Jingle Bell Rock"	J.C. Beal; J.R. Boothe	1:57
4.	"Not Tonight Santa"	Cooper; Higgins; S. Lee; Cowling; Coler	2:42
5.	"White Christmas"	Irving Berlin	2:57
6.	"Count the Days"	Cooper; Higgins; S. Lee; Cowling; Larcombe (Note: Larcombe is credited on the Christmas bonus disc as "Yuell Logg".)	3:56
7.	"Christmas Round at Ours"	Cooper; Higgins; S. Lee; Cowling; Larcombe	3:06
8.	"Merry Xmas Everybody"	Jim Lea; Noddy Holder	3:48
Total length:			26:05

20th anniversary edition – disc 1
No.	Title	Writer(s)	Length
14.	"Singapore" (definitive version)	Higgins; Shave; Cowling; Cooper	3:26
15.	"Something Kinda Ooooh"	Cooper; Higgins; Powell; Coler; Sommerville; Jody Leigh	3:23
16.	"I Think We're Alone Now" (single mix (Note: Erroneously listed as the "promo and album mix".))	Ritchie Cordell	3:42
17.	"Money"	Cooper; Higgins; Powell; Coler; Cowling	4:13

20th anniversary edition – disc 2
No.	Title	Writer(s)	Length
1.	"Naked in the Shower"	Higgins; Cooper; Cowling; Coler; Powell	3:04
2.	"You Go Too Fast" (demo)	Higgins; Cooper; Shave; Cowling; Powell; Coler	3:53
3.	"Watch Me Go (We're Disco)"	Higgins; Powell; S. Lee; Cooper; Joshua Chasez; Cowling	4:19
4.	"Nobody But You"	Cooper; Higgins; Cowling; Shave; Woods	4:11
5.	"I Don't Really Hate You"	Girls Aloud; Higgins; Cowling; Cooper; Coler; Larcombe; Powell; Yusra Marue	3:33
6.	"Crazy Fool"	Girls Aloud; Cooper; Higgins; Shave	3:36
7.	"The Crazy Life"	Girls Aloud; Higgins; Coler	3:19
8.	"Why Do It"	Girls Aloud; Cooper; Higgins; Coler	2:54
9.	"Singapore (Note: Original mix as it appeared on The Sound of Girls Aloud: The Greatest Hits.)"	Higgins; Shave; Cowling; Cooper	2:58
10.	"Long Hot Summer" (alternative version 1)	Cooper; Higgins; Sommerville; Boyle; S. Lee; Larcombe	3:52
11.	"Whole Lotta History" (video version)	Cooper; Higgins; Cowling; Sommervile; Larcombe; Xenomania	3:47
12.	"Long Hot Summer" (alternative version 2)	Cooper; Higgins; Sommerville; Boyle; S. Lee; Larcombe	3:52
13.	"Something Kinda Ooooh" (original demo)	Cooper; Higgins; Powell; Coler; Sommerville; Leigh	3:12
14.	"Whole Lotta History" (acoustic version)	Cooper; Higgins; Cowling; Sommervile; Larcombe; Xenomania	3:52
15.	"Long Hot Summer" (live at G.A.Y.)	Cooper; Higgins; Sommerville; Boyle; S. Lee; Larcombe	3:15
16.	"Love Machine" (live at Hammersmith Apollo)	Cooper; Higgins; Powell; Cowling; Coler; Boyle; S. Lee	4:56
17.	"Real Life" (live at Hammersmith Apollo)	Cooper; Higgins; Cowling; Larcombe	4:37
18.	"Teenage Dirtbag" (live at Carling Academy)	Brendan B. Brown	4:18
19.	"Biology" (live at Wembley Arena)	Cooper; Higgins; Powell; Cowling; Sommerville	4:00
20.	"I Predict a Riot" (live at Wembley)	Ricky Wilson; Andrew White; Simon Rix; Nick Baines; Nick Hodgson	4:39
21.	"I Think We're Alone Now" (The Sound of Girls Aloud version)	Cordell	3:17

20th anniversary edition – disc 3
No.	Title	Writer(s)	Length
1.	"Singapore" (Jon Shave 2025 mix)	Higgins; Shave; Cowling; Cooper	3:57
2.	"Long Hot Summer" (Tony Lamezma Rides Again)	Cooper; Higgins; Sommerville; Boyle; S. Lee; Larcombe	6:14
3.	"Biology" (Tony Lamezma remix)	Cooper; Higgins; Powell; Cowling; Sommerville	5:17
4.	"Something Kinda Ooooh" (Tony Lamezma mix)	Cooper; Higgins; Powell; Coler; Sommerville; Leigh	5:39
5.	"I Think We're Alone Now" (Uniting Nations remix)	Cordell	6:11
6.	"Whole Lotta History" (Whole Lotta Lamezma mix)	Cooper; Higgins; Cowling; Sommervile; Larcombe; Xenomania	5:09
7.	"Something Kinda Ooooh" (Freezr remix)	Cooper; Higgins; Powell; Coler; Sommerville; Leigh	6:00
8.	"Long Hot Summer" (Benitez Beats)	Cooper; Higgins; Sommerville; Boyle; S. Lee; Larcombe	5:12
9.	"I Think We're Alone Now" (Tony Lamezma Baubletastic Remix)	Cordell	5:30
10.	"Biology" (Benitez Beats)	Cooper; Higgins; Powell; Cowling; Sommerville	4:27
11.	"Something Kinda Ooooh" (Co-Stars remix)	Cooper; Higgins; Powell; Coler; Sommerville; Leigh	5:43
12.	"I Think We're Alone Now" (alternative mix)	Cordell	5:30
13.	"See the Day" (Soundhouse Masterblaster Mix)	D. Lee	5:05
14.	"I Think We're Alone Now" (Co-Stars Epic Club Mix)	Cordell	7:00

== Charts ==
=== Weekly charts ===
Weekly chart performance for Chemistry
Chart (2005)	Peak position
Australian Hitseeker Albums (ARIA)	12
Irish Albums (IRMA)	31
Scottish Albums (Official Charts)	4
UK Albums (Official Charts)	11

Weekly chart performance for Chemistry: 20th Anniversary Edition
Chart (2025)	Peak position
UK Albums	71
UK Vinyl Albums	8

=== Year-end chart ===
Year-end chart performance for Chemistry
Chart (2005)	Position
UK Albums (OCC)	74

== Certifications ==
Certifications of Chemistry
Region	Certification	Certified units/sales
Ireland (IRMA)	Platinum	15,000^{^}
United Kingdom (BPI)	Platinum	390,000
^{^} Shipments figures based on certification alone.

== Release history ==
Chemistry release history
Region	Date	Label	Edition	Format	Ref.
United Kingdom	5 December 2005	Polydor	Standard; Special Christmas	CD; digital download	
Ireland	5 December 2005	Polydor	Standard; Special Christmas	CD; digital download	
New Zealand	20 February 2006	Polydor	Standard; Special Christmas	CD; digital download	
Australia	20 February 2006	Polydor	Standard; Special Christmas	CD; digital download	
Worldwide	26 September 2025	Polydor	20th Anniversary	CD; digital download; vinyl; streaming	

== Other notes ==
- "Singapore", a track recorded during the album sessions that was not picked for the final album was later released on The Sound of Girls Aloud: The Greatest Hits compilation limited edition bonus disc. The song was originally known as "Dark Streets".
- "On My Way To Satisfaction", a track recorded during the album sessions that was not picked for the final album was later released on the St. Trinian's soundtrack. Footage of Sarah recording the track was shown on Girls Aloud: Home Truths. The song is registered on ASCAP under the name "Red Raw".
- "Black Jacks", a track that was eventually released on Girls Aloud's fourth album, Tangled Up, was originally recorded during the sessions of Chemistry.
- "Models" was used as the opening tune for Girls Aloud's television series titled "Off The Record" and a shortened version appears on the second disc of Something Kinda Ooooh. A music video for "Models" was produced for use in their Ten: The Hits Tour and pays homage to the Victoria's Secret Fashion Show, with the girls backstage wearing the trademark pink dressing gowns.
