= Popjustice: 100% Solid Pop Music =

Compilation album by Various Artists
- Released: 23 October 2006
- Recorded: Various Times
- Genre: Pop
- Length: 1:13:07
- Label: Fascination Records
- Compiler: Popjustice

Professional ratings
Review scores
Source	Rating
The Observer	4/5 stars

Popjustice: 100% Solid Pop Music is a compilation album released on 23 October 2006. The album is a non-stop mix mixed by Xfm DJ Grant McSleazy, and is one of the first released on the newly formed Fascination Records. It features exclusive songs by Client, Sophie Ellis-Bextor, Girls Aloud and Pet Shop Boys. The track list was arranged by the editor of the Popjustice website.

== Track listing ==
1. Rihanna – "SOS (Rescue Me)"
2. The Automatic – "Monster" (Culprit One remix)
3. Sugababes – "I Bet You Look Good on the Dancefloor" (Arctic Babes mix)
4. Girls Aloud – "Love Machine" (demo version)
5. Annie – "Me Plus One"
6. Alesha – "Lipstick"
7. Ladytron – "Destroy Everything You Touch"
8. Franz Ferdinand – "Do You Want To"
9. Justice vs. Simian – "We Are Your Friends"
10. Client – "Lights Go Out"
11. The Similou – "All This Love" (The Drill Mix)
12. The Pussycat Dolls – "Hot Stuff (I Want You Back)"
13. STEFY – "Chelsea"
14. Pet Shop Boys – "It's a Sin" (Barfly Version)
15. Rachel Stevens – "Some Girls"
16. Britney Spears – "Do Somethin'"
17. Kelly Clarkson – "Since U Been Gone" (Jason Nevins radio edit)
18. Scissor Sisters – "Mary" (Junkie XL radio edit)
19. Nelly Furtado – "Maneater" (radio version)
20. The Killers – "Mr. Brightside" (Jacques Lu Cont's Thin White Duke edit)
21. Sophie Ellis-Bextor – "Dear Jimmy"
22. Girls Aloud – "Biology" (Radio Edit)
23. Girls Aloud – "Biology" (Tony Lamezma remix)
