= Chemistry: The Tour =

2006 concert tour by Girls Aloud

- Tour by Girls Aloud
- Promotional poster for the tour
- Associated album: Chemistry
- Start date: 22 May 2006
- End date: 3 June 2006
- Legs: 1
- No. of shows: 10

Girls Aloud concert chronology
- What Will the Neighbours Say...? Tour (2005); Chemistry: The Tour (2006); The Greatest Hits Tour (2007)

Chemistry: The Tour was the second concert tour by British all-female pop group Girls Aloud. It supported their third studio album, Chemistry. Following the success of 2005's What Will the Neighbours Say...? Tour, Girls Aloud performed in arenas across the United Kingdom for the first time. Girls Aloud announced tour dates in October 2005. They performed just ten dates, making it their shortest tour. The tour began in Nottingham on 22 May 2006 and concluded in London on 3 June 2006.

The show was divided into five sections with distinct costumes, including the encore. The set list featured songs mostly from Chemistry, but also included singles from Girls Aloud's first two albums and cover versions. Girls Aloud began the show by rising from underneath the stage to perform the opening number "Biology". The stage included video screens and a catwalk which extended into the audience.

Chemistry: The Tour received generally positive reviews from contemporary music critics who praised Girls Aloud's energy and fun. The tour was a commercial success, leading to the announcement of another arena tour the following year. A recording of the show was released on DVD in November 2006, oddly titled Girls Aloud: Greatest Hits Live From Wembley Arena to coincide with the release of the group's first greatest hits collection The Sound of Girls Aloud: The Greatest Hits.

== Background and development ==
The tour dates were announced towards the end of October 2005. Tickets went on sale on 4 November 2005, although pre-sale started two days earlier. The group did not tour in Northern Ireland or the Republic of Ireland, due to low record sales in Ireland. Girls Aloud also made their festival debut at 2006's V Festival.

Kimberley Walsh said the tour would be "bigger and better" than the What Will the Neighbours Say...? Tour, due to the size of the venues. "Everything will be in an arena so it gives us a bit more room to do some of the things we would have liked to have done last time." Girls Aloud also decided to take a more sexualised approach to the tour to make it "different" from their last. The stage included a catwalk which extended into the audience. There were two smaller video screens on the sides of the stage and a large one in the centre.

== Concert synopsis ==
The tour begins with an introduction "evokes memories of Weird Science", as a mad scientist creates five women. The video screen shows data for each member appearing one by one, followed by a ten-second countdown. The countdown begins to malfunction as pyrotechnics occur on stage. Girls Aloud then rise from underneath the stage. The introduction was seen as a reference to Girls Aloud's reality show beginnings. The group wear red, white, and black outfits as they perform "Biology". For the following performance, Girls Aloud don white lab coats over their outfits as they perform "No Good Advice". Taking the theme of a laboratory, white sheet trolleys and shelves of potions and bottles are brought on stage. After a brief dance break, Cheryl Cole is put into a box. A red curtain is lifted around her and then dropped, revealing a missing Cole. She reappearsand the song finishes. "Waiting", an album track from Chemistry, then follows. A Pink Panther themed dance is performed, leading into "Love Machine". The performance incorporates a sample of Amerie's hit single "1 Thing".

The dancers perform a dance break as Girls Aloud change into scantily-clad summer outfits. Cheryl Cole returns first and joins the dancers, beginning to perform "Long Hot Summer" as the rest of the girls join her. There are benches on each side of the stage, which Girls Aloud use in their dance routine. They take to the benches to perform the ballad "Whole Lotta History". Girls Aloud are rejoined by their dancers to perform the Chemistry album track "Watch Me Go". They end the section with a cover of the Kaiser Chiefs' breakthrough single "I Predict a Riot". Kaiser Chiefs frontman Ricky Wilson was "upset" because Girls Aloud changed a lyric from "condom" to "bus stop."

After a video interlude, Girls Aloud return to the stage in showgirl costumes and perform "See the Day". This is followed by a performance of their debut single "Sound of the Underground", which sees them replace the original microphone stand choreography with chairs. Girls Aloud then perform a medley of songs from 1980s movie musicals. The songs within the medley are: "Fame", sung by Nadine Coyle and Cole; "Flashdance... What a Feeling", sung by Nicola Roberts and Walsh; and Footloose", sung by Sarah Harding.

Following another video interlude, the girl group return in different-coloured dresses. They open the new act with "The Show", which sees them perform on stools behind lighted frames. Whilst singing "Intro" from Chemistry, the members each walk down the catwalk during their respective lines. This is followed by "Models", which also follows "Intro" on the album. "Racy Lacey" is performed next, as the silhouette of a pole dancer is seen on the video screens. Girls Aloud stand at the end of the catwalk to sing the ballad "I'll Stand by You", before performing a reprise of opening number "Biology."

The encore begins with "Wild Horses", as Girls Aloud and their dancers return to the stage in hooded black cloaks. As the song transitions into "Wake Me Up", they remove their cloaks revealing five unique costumes: a cowgirl (Cole), a police officer (Coyle), a cadet (Harding), a sailor (Roberts), and race car driver (Walsh). The show ends with "Jump".

== Opening acts ==
- Frank
- Nylon

== Setlist ==
1. "Biology"
2. "No Good Advice"
3. "Waiting"
4. "Love Machine" (contains elements of "1 Thing")
5. "Long Hot Summer"
6. "Whole Lotta History"
7. "Watch Me Go"
8. "I Predict a Riot"
9. "See the Day"
10. "Sound of the Underground"
11. Medley: "Fame"/"What a Feeling"/"Footloose"
12. "The Show"
13. "Intro"/"Models"
14. "Racy Lacey"
15. "I'll Stand by You"
16. "Biology" (reprise)

Encore

17. "Wild Horses"/"Wake Me Up"
18. "Jump"

== Tour dates ==
Date	City	Country	Venue
22 May 2006	Nottingham	England	Nottingham Arena
23 May 2006	Sheffield	England	Hallam FM Arena
24 May 2006	Newcastle	England	Metro Radio Arena
26 May 2006	Birmingham	England	National Indoor Arena
27 May 2006	Manchester	England	Manchester Evening News Arena
28 May 2006	Glasgow	Scotland	Scottish Exhibition Hall
30 May 2006	Cardiff	Wales	Cardiff International Arena
31 May 2006	Bournemouth	England	Windsor Hall
1 June 2006	Brighton	England	Brighton Centre
3 June 2006	London	England	Wembley Arena

== Broadcasts and recordings ==
Girls Aloud: Greatest Hits Live from Wembley Arena

Video by Girls Aloud
- Released: 13 November 2006
- Recorded: Wembley Arena; 3 June 2006
- Genre: Pop
- Length: 130:00
- Label: Polydor

Girls Aloud chronology
What Will the Neighbours Say? Live in Concert (2005)	''Girls Aloud: Greatest Hits Live from Wembley Arena'' (2006)	Style (2007)

The tour was recorded on 3 June 2006 at Wembley Arena. Footage was later released on DVD that year. Girls Aloud: Greatest Hits Live from Wembley Arena is the second live video album fourth DVD release from Girls Aloud, released on 13 November 2006. Despite the title, the DVD features the Chemistry Tour as opposed to 2007's The Sound of Girls Aloud: The Greatest Hits Tour. In a review of the DVD, Glenn Meads of the Rochdale Observer praised Girls Aloud's performance. He wrote, "Now you can recapture the ladies live on this brand new DVD. Smooth vocal harmonies, athletic choreography, arresting visuals and packed with hits – I am not talking about Madonna or Kylie. The girls deliver on all these fronts and more in this memento of the gig to remember." The DVD was certified gold by the British Phonographic Industry.

An edited version of the performance was shown on Channel 4 on Christmas Eve in 2006, titled "Girls Aloud: Live and Lovely!" It has been shown a number of times on VH1 under the title "Girls Aloud: Live at Wembley." An audio recording of the Kaiser Chiefs cover "I Predict a Riot" was included on the rarities disc of Girls Aloud's greatest hits album The Sound of Girls Aloud: The Greatest Hits. A live recording of "Biology" was an iTunes bonus track.

== Critical response ==
The tour received widespread acclaim from contemporary music critics who complimented the show's relentless fun. Laura Lee Davies of The Times praised the show, calling it "a thrilling hour and a half of skinny pants, fireworks and dry ice." Sophie Heawood of The Guardian gave the concert four stars out of five. Heawood lauded the group's energy, vocals, and the show's "Broadway feel". Scotland's Sunday Mail also gave the show four stars. Glenn Meads of the Rochdale Observer wrote that "the girls confounded the critics – producing a slick live performance which left the fans eager for more."

It was noted by critics that while Girls Aloud are not the best singers or dancers, they sing live. In a review for The Daily Telegraph, Michael Deacon stated that Girls Aloud aren't the best singers or dancers – "next to the dominant Nadine, the other four sound like squirrels on helium […] their routines are loveably literal: if a lyric mentions knocking at the door or drinking a cup of tea, all five helpfully mime it." He continued, however, that "Girls Aloud aren't about polish and perfection. They're about fun, and they deliver it in heaps." He wrote, "There's one vital thing that's absolutely un-manufactured about Girls Aloud, and that's their obvious love of what they're doing." Heawood wrote, "Nadine Coyle carries most of the lead vocals, but each Girl can belt it out when required […] there's no Posh Spice-style miming in the background from Cheryl Tweedy."

The show also received attention for its sexuality despite children being present. "It's a saucy affair, all bras and hot-pants, and with songs such as Racy Lacy and Watch Me Go, sexual suggestions are everywhere. Yet with an audience made up of mums and their sparkly pink daughters, the level of suggestion is where the sauce remains", Heawood wrote. Michael Deacon noted that Girls Aloud changed the "condom" lyric in "I Predict a Riot" but then performed "Racy Lacey", which contains the lyric "She's got a PhD with her legs apart."
