= See the Day =

1985 single by Dee C. Lee

Single by Dee C. Lee

from the album Shrine
- B-side: "The Paris Match"
- Released: 21 October 1985
- Genre: R&B; pop; soul
- Label: CBS
- Songwriter: Dee C. Lee
- Producer: Brian Robson

Dee C. Lee singles chronology
"Don't Do It Baby" (1984)	"See the Day" (1985)	"Come Hell or Waters High" (1986)

"See the Day" is a song by English singer Dee C. Lee, released as a single on 21 October 1985. On 2 December it peaked at number 3 on the UK Singles Chart where it stayed for two weeks. The single sold in excess of 250,000 copies, receiving a silver certification, and became Lee's biggest hit single and her only UK top-40 hit, peaking at number three. "See the Day" also charted in Australia, the Netherlands, and West Germany. The B-side of the single, "The Paris Match", features Lee's future husband Paul Weller and his band the Style Council, of which Lee was a part-time member.

"See the Day" was covered by Girls Aloud in 2005, where it reached number nine on the UK Singles Chart.

== Track listings ==
7-inch single

A. "See the Day"
B. "The Paris Match"

12-inch single

A1 "See the Day"
A2 "The Paris Match"
B1 "Luck" (live version)
B2 "Don't Do It Baby" (remix)

== Charts ==
=== Weekly charts ===
Chart (1985–1986)	Peak position
Australia (Kent Music Report)	5
Belgium (Ultratop 50 Flanders)	18
Ireland (IRMA)	3
Netherlands (Single Top 100)	36
New Zealand (Recorded Music NZ)	28
UK Singles (Official Charts)	3
West Germany (GfK)	36

=== Year-end charts ===
Chart (1985)	Position
UK Singles (OCC)	45

Chart (1986)	Position
Australia (Kent Music Report)	52

== Girls Aloud version ==
"See the Day"

Single by Girls Aloud

from the album Chemistry
- B-side: "It's Magic"; "I Don't Really Hate You"
- Released: 19 December 2005
- Recorded: 2005
- Genre: Pop
- Length: 4:04
- Label: Polydor
- Songwriter: Dee C. Lee
- Producers: Brian Higgins; Xenomania

Girls Aloud singles chronology
"Biology" (2005)	"See the Day" (2005)	"Whole Lotta History" (2006)

Audio sample
- file; help

Music video
- "See the Day" on YouTube

Alternative cover
- UK CD 2 cover

In 2005, British girl group Girls Aloud recorded a cover of "See the Day" for their third studio album Chemistry. Their version was produced by Brian Higgins and his production team Xenomania. A contender for the Christmas number one, the single was released just five weeks after the group's previous single, "Biology". The single became Girls Aloud's lowest charting single at that point, but continued their string of top ten hits on the UK Singles Chart and received extensive airplay.

The music video, which had the feel of a painting, featured Girls Aloud in the scenic landscape of a snow globe. "See the Day" was promoted through numerous live appearances and was featured on 2006's Chemistry Tour. Although the track was "given a glossy 21st century refurb," contemporary music critics criticized the song for its lack of creativity and similarities to Girls Aloud's 2004 cover of "I'll Stand by You".

=== Background and release ===
Much like Girls Aloud's 2004 cover of the Pretenders' "I'll Stand by You", Brian Higgins and Xenomania felt "See the Day" needed to stick closely to the original in terms of tone. The song, described as "the obligatory Christmas ballad", was "given a glossy 21st century refurb."

The song was released on 19 December 2005 as a contender for the Christmas number one of the year. It was available on two CD single formats and as a digital download. The first disc included "It's Magic", an album track from Chemistry co-written by Girls Aloud and sung solely by Nicola Roberts. The second CD format included a previously unreleased track entitled "I Don't Really Hate You", as well as a Chemistry album medley and the Soundhouse Masterblaster Mix of "See the Day". The artwork of the second disc features Girls Aloud lying on the ground, positioned to create a snowflake.

=== Reception ===
==== Critical response ====
Girls Aloud's version of "See the Day" received generally negative reviews from contemporary music critics. The cover was largely slated for its lack of creativity and similarities to their 2004 cover of The Pretenders' "I'll Stand by You" (although some critics preferred it). John Murphy of musicOMH stated that "See The Day should wipe away all memories of I'll Stand By You" and that while it's "not in the same league as the Girls' Xenomania compositions, but it's still by far the best cover version they've done." Virgin Media said that "coming so hot on the heels of the still-charting Biology and taken from an album chock-full of corking tracks, it seems more than a little cynical."

Girls Aloud won the Heart Award for "See the Day" at the O2 Silver Clef Lunch, an annual awards ceremony honouring songwriting and performance in aid of Nordoff-Robbins Music Therapy. Nicola Roberts and Kimberley Walsh, members of the band, attended the awards presentation ceremony.

==== Band comments ====
While reflecting on their discography during an interview with the Gay Times promoting their 2024 reunion tour, the band expressed negative feelings towards the song, with Nadine sardonically stating "That's not a single. I don't know what happened there" and sarcastically referred to the track's release as a single as "an accident." Kimberley explicitly disavowed it, saying "We don't claim it." Cheryl called the song a "blip". Cheryl also stated in 2008 that "See The Day" was only released because they were stuck for ballads, saying "I wish we hadn't released See The Day. I absolutely hate that track, I don't think it's us at all, it's really old fashioned."

==== Chart performance ====
"See the Day" became Girls Aloud's lowest charting single to date when it entered the UK Singles Chart at number nine, behind other new entries by Shayne Ward and Eminem at numbers one and five respectively. The single fell just one position the following week, rounding out the top ten. It then swiftly fell down the charts, falling to number nineteen in its third week. The song spent a total of just six weeks in the UK's top 75. "See the Day" made Girls Aloud the first girl group to achieve eleven consecutive top ten singles. The song was also an airplay hit. It was, however, less successful on the official UK Download Chart, where "See the Day" debuted at number 29.

On 16 June 2006, Lucy Benjamin performed a version of "See the Day" on The X Factor: Battle of the Stars that was credited to Girls Aloud rather than Dee C. Lee. Following the final and Benjamin's victory, the single briefly re-entered the top 200.

"See the Day" entered the Irish Singles Chart at number sixteen. It fell to number seventeen the following week, before rising to number fifteen in its third week. "See the Day" reached its peak of number fourteen in its fourth week on the Irish Singles Chart. The single spent eight weeks in Ireland's top fifty.

=== Music video ===
The music video for "See the Day" was directed by Harvey & Carolyn, filmed one day after the video for "Biology" during Nicola Roberts' 20th birthday on 5 October 2005. The video starts with a stage curtain being drawn back, similar to the opening for the video for "Biology". The girls are revealed to be in a snowy realm wearing white dresses. Throughout the video, various close-up glamour shots are shown, as well as group shots of the girls standing in a line and sitting around a pond reflecting the night sky. At one point, the girls can be seen within a snow globe, perched upon a human hand. The video ends with the girls seated around the pond, while the song title glitters in the sky. The curtain then closes. The video can be found on the DVD release of 2006's Chemistry Tour, as well as 2007's Style DVD.

=== Live performances ===
Girls Aloud performed "See the Day" live for the first time at Children in Need's Great Big Bid. The band appeared on Blue Peter, CD:UK (twice), Hit40UK, Ministry of Mayhem, The Paul O'Grady Show, Today with Des and Mel, Top of the Pops, and Top of the Pops Reloaded. It was also featured on 2006's Chemistry Tour. As one of the group's least favourite singles, as well as one of the worst-performing, "See the Day" has rarely been performed live since its release.

=== Track listings ===
UK CD1 (Polydor / 9875964)

1. "See the Day" – 4:04
2. "It's Magic" – 3:52

UK CD2 (Polydor / 9875965)

1. "See the Day" – 4:04
2. "I Don't Really Hate You" – 3:38
3. "See the Day" (Soundhouse Masterblaster Mix) – 5:02
4. "Chemistry Album Medley" – 3:08
5. "See the Day" (video) – 3:29
6. "See the Day" (karaoke video) – 3:29
7. "See the Day" (game)
8. "See the Day" (ringtone)

The Singles Boxset (CD11)

1. "See the Day" – 4:04
2. "It's Magic" – 3:52
3. "I Don't Really Hate You" – 3:38
4. "See the Day" (Soundhouse Masterblaster Mix) – 5:02
5. "Chemistry Album Medley" – 3:08
6. "See the Day" (video) – 3:29
7. "See the Day" (karaoke video) – 3:29
8. "See the Day" (game)

Digital EP

1. "See The Day" – 3:55
2. "It's Magic" – 3:52
3. "I Don't Really Hate You" – 3:31
4. "See The Day" (SOUNDHOUSE Masterblaster mix) – 5:03
5. "Medley" – 4:02

=== Credits and personnel ===
- Saxophone: Ian Ritchie
- Guitar: Nick Coler
- Keyboards: Brian Higgins, Tim Powell, Jon Shave
- Mastering: Dick Beetham for 360 Mastering
- Mixing: Brian Higgins, Tim Powell
- Production: Brian Higgins, Xenomania
- Programming: Brian Higgins, Tim Powell
- Vocals: Girls Aloud
- Published by Warner/Chappell Music and Xenomania Music

=== Charts ===
==== Weekly charts ====
Chart (2005)	Peak position
Ireland (IRMA)	14
Scottish Singles Sales (Official Charts)	8
UK Singles (Official Charts)	9
UK Airplay (Music Week)	6

==== Year-end charts ====
Chart (2005)	Position
UK Singles (OCC)	180

== Other versions ==
- Lucy Benjamin performed a version of "See the Day" (credited to Girls Aloud rather than Dee C. Lee) on The X Factor: Battle of the Stars in 2006.
- The song was recorded by British musical theatre performer Louise Dearman for her 2012 album Here Comes the Sun.
- Leanne Dobinson performed a version of See the Day during her time on How Do You Solve A Problem Like Maria?.
