= Davina (talk show) =

- Created by: BBC
- Presented by: Davina McCall
- Country of origin: United Kingdom
- Original language: English
- No. of series: 1
- No. of episodes: 8 (list of episodes)

Production
- Production location: BBC Television Centre
- Running time: 60 minutes

Original release
- Network: BBC One
- Release: 15 February – 12 April 2006

Davina is a British chat show hosted by Davina McCall. It first aired on BBC One on 15 February 2006, however, the show ended on 12 April 2006 at the end of its first series due to low ratings.

The series was announced in December 2005. One show attracted fewer than 2.3 million viewers, when it was moved to 7pm. The series received a poor critical reception, with Gareth Maclean saying that McCall "... found herself floundering and foundering, struggling through "interviews" with stars of the calibre of Girls Aloud, Westlife and Patrick Kielty...", and "... demonstrated a complete lack of talent as a chatshow host", with McCall herself saying that the programme was "the worst mistake of her life".

== Guests ==
The guests for the series were:

Episode	Air date	Guests	Musical guests
1	15 February 2006	Max Beesley; Julian Clary; Vernon Kay; Tess Daly	Charlotte Church; KT Tunstall
2	22 February 2006	Pierce Brosnan; Patrick Kielty; Martin Shaw	Westlife; Corrine Bailey Rae
3	1 March 2006	Gloria Hunniford; Zöe Lucker; Neil Morrissey; Gordon Ramsay	Sugababes; Orson
4	8 March 2006	Ed Byrne; Katie Price; Eamonn Holmes	Girls Aloud; Vittorio Grigolo
5	15 March 2006	Michelle Collins; Alistair McGowan; Omid Djalili	Beverley Knight; Cyndi Lauper
6	29 March 2006	Dawn French; Jill Halfpenny; Louis Walsh	Mary J. Blige; Will Young
7	5 April 2006	Jenny Eclair; Lulu; Russell Watson	Shayne Ward; David Gray
8	12 April 2006	Jade Goody; Kacey Ainsworth; Richard Wilson; Piers Morgan; Peter Grant	Katie Melua; Kubb

== Ratings ==
This is a table displaying the averages of each show for the chatshow, which aired on BBC One. These figures are made available from MediaGuardian.

Episode	Air date	Viewers (millions)	Share
1	15 February 2006	3.5	14%
2	22 February 2006	2.7	11%
3	1 March 2006	3.0	13%
4	8 March 2006	2.5	11%
5	15 March 2006	2.3	10.4%
6	29 March 2006	2.6	12%
7	5 April 2006	2.4	11%
8	12 April 2006	2.2	11%
