= Biology (song) =

2005 single by Girls Aloud

Single by Girls Aloud

from the album Chemistry
- B-side: "Nobody but You"
- Released: 14 November 2005
- Recorded: 2005
- Genre: Progressive pop; dance-pop; electropop
- Length: 3:35
- Label: Polydor
- Songwriters: Miranda Cooper; Brian Higgins; Lisa Cowling; Giselle Sommerville
- Producers: Brian Higgins; Xenomania

Girls Aloud singles chronology
| "Long Hot Summer" (2005) | "Biology" (2005) | "See the Day" (2005) |

Audio sample
- file; help

Music video
- "Biology" on YouTube

"Biology" is a song performed by English-Irish all-female pop group Girls Aloud, taken from their third studio album Chemistry (2005). The progressive pop song was written by Miranda Cooper, Brian Higgins and Higgins' production team Xenomania, and produced by Higgins and Xenomania. Composed of distinct sections, it avoids the verse-chorus form present in most contemporary pop music. "Biology" was released as a single in November 2005, ahead of the album's release. Following "Long Hot Summer" charting at #7 on the UK Singles Chart, "Biology" returned Girls Aloud to the top five and became their tenth top ten hit.

The music video, consisting only of group shots, witnesses Girls Aloud seamlessly moving through various sequences while performing disjointed choreography. "Biology" was promoted through a number of live appearances and has since been performed on all of Girls Aloud's subsequent concert tours. The song, which includes a variety of styles, received widespread acclaim from contemporary music critics. Considered one of Girls Aloud's signature songs, The Guardian referred to "Biology" as "the best pop single of the last decade".

== Background and composition ==
"Biology" is composed of a number of distinctly different sections. The song begins with a 12/8 stanza which samples the main guitar and piano riff of the Animals 1965 song "Club a Go-Go". The tempo then changes to 4/4 and the first verse occurs, followed by two noticeably individual transitional bridges. Around two minutes into the song, the song reaches its climactic chorus before returning to the stanza heard in the introduction. The song repeats the chorus and the introduction is also used as an outro. The song avoids the typical AABA form and verse-chorus form present in most contemporary pop music.

Brian Higgins and Xenomania created "Biology" in reaction to Girls Aloud's previous single "Long Hot Summer", which Higgins called "a disaster record". Higgins continued, "I think that [Biology] is a wonderful record – so uplifting. It meant so much to us and it really set Chemistry up well." The lyric referring to "wicked games", which is mentioned in the Animals-inspired riff, was inspired by Girls Aloud almost releasing a cover of Chris Isaak's "Wicked Game" as a single, later released on the 20th anniversary edition of their previous album, What Will the Neighbours Say? (2004).

The song's title inspired the album's title, Chemistry. Both the single and album title refer to the scientific fields of biology and chemistry.

== Release ==
For the new single and album, Girls Aloud employed stylist Victoria Adcock. Promotion for the single received a setback when Sarah Harding was diagnosed with kidney infection. Girls Aloud also announced dates for 2006's Chemistry Tour.

The single was released on 14 November 2005. It was available on two CD single formats and as a digital download. The first disc included the Tony Lamezma Club Mix of Girls Aloud's 2004 single "The Show". The second CD format included a previously unreleased track entitled "Nobody but You", as well as the Tony Lamezma Remix of "Biology". The artwork was inspired by UK punk band X-Ray Spex's album cover Germfree Adolescents. Both covers show each member in a different pose, trapped inside a large vial. A live recording of "Biology" from Wembley Arena was featured on the iTunes version of The Sound of Girls Aloud: The Greatest Hits, and later on 2008's Girls A Live and Girls Aloud's singles boxset. Both the album version and Tony Lamezma Remix of "Biology" appear on Popjustice: 100% Solid Pop Music. "Biology" was released as a CD single in Australia on 20 February 2006.

== Critical reception ==
"Biology" received universal acclaim from music critics. The song was particularly notable for its informal structure. Popjustice referred to the song as "pop music which redefines the supposed boundaries of pop music." BBC Music said "the girls rip through a variety of styles, paces and Neneh Cherry-esque raps [...] all within the same song." Virgin Media praised the song for "blending the kind of saucy cabaret you'd expect to find in a gin-soaked saloon bar with a glorious chorus of fizzing, gliding synths and deceptively breakneck beats." The song was described as "about as far from tired formula as you can possibly get. It sounds like three separate melodies condensed into one, from the Muddy Waters-apeing riff at the start, through to the glorious pop sheen of the verses, and having the sheer balls to wait two minutes before even introducing a chorus." musicOMH noted that the song "breaks all the rules of manufactured pop" and stated that "Biology is yet more proof that Xenomania write the best pop songs around and that Girls Aloud are pretty much the perfect group to sing them [...] it's the single of the year." Stylus Magazine also praised the song.

Peter Cashmore, writing for The Guardian, described "Biology" as "the best pop single of the last decade". Peter Robinson of music website Popjustice said the song was "a great example of a song which pleased people with no passion for pop but also managed to hit the spot with those who totally loved the stuff [...] At once avant garde and relentlessly, demented mainstream, 'Biology' quickly became one of Girls Aloud's signature tunes." In September 2006, "Biology" won the award for the Popjustice £20 Music Prize, an annual prize awarded by a panel of judges organised by Popjustice to the singer(s) of the best British pop single of the past year. Girls Aloud had previously won the award in 2003 and 2005 for "No Good Advice" and "Wake Me Up" respectively. The song was listed at number 245 on American review site Pitchfork's "The Top 500 Tracks of the 2000s" list, despite Girls Aloud never receiving any sort of Stateside push. Billboard named the song #32 on their list of 100 Greatest Girl Group Songs of All Time.

== Chart performance ==
Following the disappointing chart position of "Long Hot Summer", "Biology" saw Girls Aloud return to the top five on the UK Singles Chart. The single entered the chart at number four. The song fell just one position to round at the top five the following week. It spent a third week in the top ten, slipping to number nine. The song spent a total of ten weeks in the UK's top 75. The song also peaked at number two on the official UK Singles Downloads Chart, held off by Madonna's "Hung Up".

Similarly to the song's performance in the UK, "Biology" returned Girls Aloud to the top ten in Ireland, entering the Irish Singles Chart at number seven. It slipped just two places to number nine in its second week. The single spent three more weeks in Ireland's top twenty before falling. It spent a total of ten weeks in Ireland's top fifty. "Biology" peaked at number twenty-six in Australia, spending six weeks on the ARIA Singles Chart.

== Music video ==
The music video for "Biology" was filmed on 4 October 2005 and directed by production team Harvey & Carolyn for Alchemy Films, with art direction from Maria Chryssikos. The video, which consists only of group shots, witnesses Girls Aloud seamlessly moving through various sequences in scenes of disjointed choreography. Like the song itself, the video showcases a variety of styles. The music video begins with a curtain being drawn back to reveal the band members posed in black jazz dresses, stood against a black background decorated with expensive-looking candelabra and chandeliers. Nadine Coyle, perched upon a black grand piano, sings the jazzy intro. As the song's introduction ends, the scene then morphs into a room with white wallpaper embellished with black butterflies. Girls Aloud's outfits turn into frilly pink and purple dresses as digitised butterflies begin to float by. The scene transitions into a room with pink wallpaper and black floral patterns, while the group's outfits change into the red and black outfits seen on the single's artwork. The scene reverts to the opening sequence as Girls Aloud perform choreography involving chairs. As the song reaches its climax, the group are seen seamlessly moving between the various scenes and the different outfits. The video ends with a curtain closing.

Peter Robinson noted that the single's video captured Girls Aloud's "distinct visual style and some endearingly shambolic synchronised dance moves." The video can be found on the DVD release of 2006's Chemistry Tour (released as The Greatest Hits Live from Wembley), as well as 2007's Style.

== Live performances ==
Girls Aloud performed "Biology" for the first time on Top of the Pops on 16 October 2005, wearing the black dresses from their music video. They appeared on CD:UK on 12 November. Following the show, Sarah Harding collapsed and was diagnosed with a kidney infection. They returned to the show just ten days later, performing in the black-and-red outfits seen on the single's artwork against the pink set from the music video. Girls Aloud also appeared on Children in Need 2005, GMTV, Ministry of Mayhem, and Top of the Pops Reloaded. They performed the song during the last ever Smash Hits Poll Winners Party at Wembley Arena. Girls Aloud performed "Biology" on a number of Australian shows during their week-long promotional trip, including 9am with David & Kim, Sunrise, and whatUwant.

"Biology" has been performed by the group at a number of summer festivals and open-air concerts, such as T4 on the Beach in 2007 and V Festival in 2006 and 2008. The song was also performed during promotion of Girls Aloud's 2006 greatest hits album The Sound of Girls Aloud: The Greatest Hits. They appeared on The Album Chart Show, Children in Need 2006, Davina, The Green Room, and the Vodafone Live Music Awards.

"Biology" has been performed at all of Girls Aloud's concert tours since its release. It served as the opening number of 2006's Chemistry Tour, following an introduction in which a mad scientist creates five women. Girls Aloud then rise from underneath the stage and perform "Biology". It served as the encore for the following year's The Greatest Hits Tour. "Biology" was performed as part of a cabaret section on 2008's Tangled Up Tour, accompanied by a swing-inspired dance break. The song was also featured in the first section of 2009's Out of Control Tour.

== Track listings and formats ==
UK CD1 (Polydor, 9875296)

1. "Biology" – 3:34
2. "The Show" (Tony Lamezma Club Mix) – 5:46

UK CD2 and Australian CD single (Polydor, 9875297; 9876700)

1. "Biology" – 3:34
2. "Nobody but You" (Cooper, Higgins, Cowling, Jon Shave, Paul Woods) – 4:10
3. "Biology" (Tony Lamezma Remix) – 5:15
4. "Biology" (video) – 3:34
5. "Biology" (karaoke video) – 3:34
6. "Biology" (game)

The Singles Boxset (CD10)

1. "Biology" – 3:35
2. "The Show" (Tony Lamezma Club Mix) – 5:46
3. "Nobody but You" – 4:10
4. "Biology" (Tony Lamezma Remix) – 5:15
5. "Biology" (Benitez Beats)
6. "Biology" (Live from Wembley)
7. "Biology" (video) – 3:35
8. "Biology" (karaoke video) – 3:35
9. "Biology" (game)

Digital EP

1. "Biology" – 3:34
2. "Nobody But You" – 4:09
3. "Biology" (Tony Lamezma remix) – 5:15
4. "Biology" (Benitez Beats Remix) – 4:27
5. "Biology" (live) – 4:02

== Credits and personnel ==
- Guitar: Nick Coler, Shawn Lee
- Keyboards: Brian Higgins, Tim Powell
- Mastering: Dick Beetham for 360 Mastering
- Mixing: Tim Powell
- Production: Brian Higgins, Xenomania
- Programming: Brian Higgins, Tim Powell
- Songwriting: Miranda Cooper, Brian Higgins, Lisa Cowling, Giselle Sommerville
- Vocals: Girls Aloud
- Published by Warner/Chappell Music and Xenomania Music

== Charts ==
=== Weekly charts ===
Weekly chart performance for "Biology"
| Chart (2005–2006) | Peak position |
|---|---|
| Australia (ARIA) | 26 |
| Europe (Eurochart Hot 100) | 14 |
| Ireland (IRMA) | 7 |
| Scottish Singles Sales (Official Charts) | 3 |
| UK Singles (Official Charts) | 4 |
| UK Airplay (Music Week) | 34 |

=== Year-end charts ===
Year-end chart performance for "Biology"
| Chart (2005) | Position |
|---|---|
| UK Singles (OCC) | 65 |

== Certifications ==
Certifications for "Biology"
| Region | Certification | Certified units/sales |
|---|---|---|
| United Kingdom (BPI) | Silver | 200,000^{‡} |
^{‡} Sales+streaming figures based on certification alone.
