= Long Hot Summer (Girls Aloud song) =

2005 single by Girls Aloud

Single by Girls Aloud

from the album Chemistry
- B-side: "Love Machine" (live)
- Released: 22 August 2005
- Recorded: 2005
- Genre: Dance-rock; new wave; pop rock
- Length: 3:52
- Label: Polydor
- Songwriters: Miranda Cooper; Brian Higgins; Tim "Rolf" Larcombe; Shawn Lee; Lisa Cowling; Giselle Sommerville; Myra Boyle
- Producers: Brian Higgins; Xenomania

Girls Aloud singles chronology
"Wake Me Up" (2005)	"Long Hot Summer" (2005)	"Biology" (2005)

Audio sample
- file; help

Music video
- "Long Hot Summer" on YouTube

Alternative cover
- UK Maxi CD cover

"Long Hot Summer" is a song by English-Irish all-female pop group Girls Aloud, taken as the first single from their third studio album Chemistry (2005). The song was written by Miranda Cooper, Brian Higgins and his production team Xenomania, and produced by Higgins and Xenomania. "Long Hot Summer" was written for inclusion in the Disney film Herbie: Fully Loaded (2005), but plans fell through. Higgins later described the track as "a disaster record." Released in August 2005, it became Girls Aloud's first single to miss the top five on the UK Singles Chart, peaking at number seven.

The music video drew inspiration from the possibility of inclusion on the Herbie soundtrack, taking place at a garage where Girls Aloud work as auto mechanics. "Long Hot Summer" was promoted through numerous live appearances and has since been performed on two of the group's concert tours. The "upbeat pop tune" received mixed reviews from contemporary music critics; some reviewers thought the song felt "flat."

The song has been covered by Taiwanese singer Amber An for her 2011 album Evil Girl, reworked in Mandarin as 惡女.

== Background and composition ==
The song is produced in the key of D flat major. Described as an "upbeat pop tune", the song received comparisons to Bananarama. It was also called "brilliantly barmy, with its lyrics about transvestite boyfriends running down the Old Kent Road."

"Long Hot Summer" was written by Xenomania while they were in Los Angeles to meet with Disney. It was recorded for inclusion on the soundtrack to the 2005 Disney film, Herbie: Fully Loaded. The plans fell through (although the music video would take inspiration from the film). Brian Higgins has expressed his disdain with the song, saying that "chasing the soundtrack [...] disrupted us creatively. It was making us miserable. Something had to come out and that was Long Hot Summer. It was made in a panic. It was a disaster record. I can't stand it."

== Release ==
The single was released on 22 August 2005. It was available on two CD single formats and a 12-inch vinyl. The first disc included a live track of "Love Machine", recorded at the Hammersmith Apollo during Girls Aloud's What Will the Neighbours Say...? Tour. The second disc featured a recording of "Real Life", as well as the Benitez Beats remix of "Long Hot Summer". Each member of Girls Aloud created their own cocktail recipe to complement the cover art of the second CD. Meanwhile, the 12-inch included the Tony Lamezma Rides Again remix of the single as well as the Almighty Remix of "Jump". A live version of "Long Hot Summer" from G-A-Y with altered lyrics was released as an iTunes exclusive.

== Reception ==
=== Critical response ===
The song received mixed reviews from most music critics. Although the song was called a "well-produced, upbeat pop tune, with a great hook in the chorus" by The Sentinel, most reviewers felt otherwise. Stylus Magazine said that the song was "a misstep, fizzy and sparkling, but if pop can only be described as such, then it goes flat long before October rolled on." Alexis Kirke of musicOMH noted, "The Girls' songwriters, Brian Higgins and Miranda Cooper of Xenomania, suffer from the weaknesses of their strength - which is the courage to try something "pop-new" each time." John Murphy of musicOMH later praised the song in his review of Chemistry that the song "seemed to be greeted with disappointment by GA aficionados, but with its lyrics about cross dressing boyfriends running down the Old Kent Road with their pants on fire, it sounds beautifully, brilliantly insane here. It's also the only summer record that sounds just as good on a wet windy night in November as it does in August." "Long Hot Summer" was described as "effervescent but relatively unexciting" by Virgin Media.

=== Chart performance ===
"Long Hot Summer" debuted and peaked at number seven on the UK Singles Chart, making it Girls Aloud's first single to miss the top five after a string of eight top five hits. The single fell seven places to number fourteen in its second week on the chart. The song spent only eight weeks in the UK's top 75. "Long Hot Summer" peaked at number sixteen on the Irish Singles Chart, making it their first single to miss the top ten. It slipped to number twenty in its second week. Overall, the single spent just seven weeks in Ireland's top fifty.

== Music video ==
The music video for "Long Hot Summer" was directed by Max & Dania. It was influenced by Herbie: Fully Loaded, even though the song never actually made the film's soundtrack. The video opens with scenes of the band members wearing coveralls, working in a garage called Pit Stop. "GA Auto" is written in pink on their coveralls, the walls and a calendar. In accordance with the song's title, it is a hot day so the girls are attempting to cool themselves as they work. Each girl takes off her coveralls to reveal a skimpy clubbing outfit, and the girls proceed to do a dance routine as the song concludes.

In a review of the single, musicOMH referenced the video. Alexis Kirke wrote, "half of the Girls Aloud phenomenon is about these ladies "forms", so I'm "content" to merge this piece of media into its stylist-driven and over-thinned orange-tinted video." The video can be found on the DVD release of 2005's What Will the Neighbours Say? Live, as well as 2007's Style.

== Live performances ==
"Long Hot Summer" was performed live for the first time on CD:UK on 24 July 2005, using fans in their dance routine. They returned to the show the following month and performed the single the weekend ahead of its release, accompanied by a Jeep as a prop. They also performed the song on shows such as GMTV, Ministry of Mayhem, Pepsi Max Downloaded, Smile, Top of the Pops, and Top of the Pops Reloaded. Girls Aloud also performed at London gay nightclub G-A-Y to promote the release of "Long Hot Summer". They also appeared at the summer open-air concerts Big Gay Out, Live on the Lawn, and pop2thepark.

Girls Aloud performed "Long Hot Summer" on 2006's Chemistry Tour, 2007's The Greatest Hits Tour and 2024's The Girls Aloud Show.

== Track listings ==
UK CD1

1. "Long Hot Summer" – 3:52
2. "Love Machine" (live at Hammersmith Apollo) – 4:55

UK CD2

1. "Long Hot Summer" (radio edit) – 3:52
2. "Long Hot Summer" (Benitez Beats) – 5:12
3. "Real Life" (live at Hammersmith Apollo) – 3:52
4. "Long Hot Summer" (video) – 3:59
5. "Long Hot Summer" (karaoke video) – 3:59
6. "Long Hot Summer" (game)
7. "Long Hot Summer" (ringtone)

UK 12-inch

1. "Long Hot Summer" – 3:52
2. "Long Hot Summer" (Tony Lamezma Rides Again) – 7:12
3. "Jump" (Almighty Remix) – 7:34

UK iTunes exclusive download

1. "Long Hot Summer" (live at G-A-Y) – 3:52

Digital EP

1. "Long Hot Summer" – 3:52
2. "Love Machine" (live at Hammersmith Apollo) – 4:54
3. "Long Hot Summer" (Benitez Beats) – 5:52
4. "Real Life" (live at Hammersmith Apollo – 4:37
5. "Long Hot Summer" (Tony Lamezma Rides Again) – 6:13
6. "Long Hot Summer" (live at G-A-Y) – 3:16
7. "Long Hot Summer" (Tony Lamezma Instrumental) – 6:13

== Credits and personnel ==
- Bass guitar: Shawn Lee
- Keyboards: Brian Higgins, Tim "Rolf" Larcombe
- Mastering: Dick Beetham for 360 Mastering
- Mixing: Jeremy Wheatley
- Production: Brian Higgins, Xenomania
- Programming: Tim "Rolf" Larcombe
- Songwriting: Miranda Cooper, Brian Higgins, Tim "Rolf" Larcombe, Shawn Lee, Lisa Cowling, Giselle Sommerville, Myra Boyle
- Vocals: Girls Aloud
- Published by Warner/Chappell Music and Xenomania Music

== Charts ==
Chart (2005)	Peak position
European Hot 100 Singles (Billboard)	27
Ireland (IRMA)	16
Scottish Singles Sales (Official Charts)	6
UK Singles (Official Charts)	7
UK Airplay (Music Week)	42
