= I'll Stand by You =

1994 single by the Pretenders

- One of the color variant artworks

Single by the Pretenders

from the album Last of the Independents
- B-side: "Rebel Rock Me"
- Released: April 11, 1994
- Recorded: 1993
- Genre: Rock
- Length: 3:59
- Label: Sire; Warner Bros.; WEA
- Songwriters: Chrissie Hynde; Tom Kelly; Billy Steinberg
- Producer: Ian Stanley

The Pretenders singles chronology
"Night in My Veins" (1994)	"I'll Stand by You" (1994)	"Night in My Veins" (1994)

"I'll Stand by You" is a song recorded by the British rock band the Pretenders from their sixth studio album, Last of the Independents (1994). The song was written by Chrissie Hynde and the songwriting team of Tom Kelly and Billy Steinberg, and produced by Ian Stanley. The song is a ballad in which the singer pledges love and faithful assistance to a loved one in times of personal darkness.

Released on April 11, 1994, "I'll Stand by You" reached the top 20 in several countries, including Australia, Belgium, Canada, Iceland, the United Kingdom, and the United States. The accompanying music video was directed by London-based director Zanna, featuring Hynde taking care of an ill man in a hut. "I'll Stand by You" also became a major hit for British girl group Girls Aloud in late 2004 and American country singer Carrie Underwood in early 2007, both times recorded as a charity single. Colombian singer Shakira performed the song for the live charity telethon Hope for Haiti Now in early 2010; her cover version was released on the charity benefit album, which was also entitled Hope for Haiti Now.

== Release and commercial reception ==
"I'll Stand by You" was released as the second single from the album Last of the Independents (1994), and it reached number 16 on the US Billboard Hot 100, number 21 on Billboard's Modern Rock Tracks chart, and number 10 in the United Kingdom. It charted higher in the UK and the US than "Night in My Veins", the album's first single. The music video for "I'll Stand by You" was released in 1994 and featured Hynde caring for an ill man.

On the long-running BBC program Songwriters Circle, Hynde mentions her embarrassment at having set out to write a "hit." She goes on to say that she felt better about the song after Noel Gallagher said "he wished he'd written it." Since 2010 the song has been used in an appeal advert for the NSPCC.

== Critical reception ==
Billboard magazine wrote that Chrissie Hynde "returns with a worn, but warm vocal that evokes a powerful, moving presence." Steve Baltin from Cashbox felt that "from the opening note, this song oozes "nice". Hard to believe this is the same Chrissie Hynde who, in the song 'Precious', once told the world to "fuck off". Fourteen years ago, what drew people to her was the conviction she sang with. Though this song has a decidedly different tone, the feeling is as strong as ever. In addition, Hynde's singing has grown to where she can wail with the best of them, as she does here against a backdrop that increases perfectly with the rising emotion in her voice." Ken Tucker from Entertainment Weekly stated that the singer "matches form with content again and again" on the album, noting that she is "pledging solemn faithfulness to a loved one on the somber anthem".

Irish Evening Herald opined that the song "showcases an updated Pretenders' sound." Linda Ryan from the Gavin Report declared it one of the album's "beautiful, heart-stopping ballads", adding that it "will be a monster hit in a variety of formats." Caroline Sullivan from The Guardian remarked its "simple vow". Chuck Campbell from Knoxville News Sentinel viewed it as "straightforward and endearing". In his weekly UK chart commentary, James Masterton wrote, "Stand by to have your heartstrings tugged." He explained that it is "a gorgeous ballad of the kind Ms Hynde can churn out easily if she puts her mind to it. A potential classic to rival '2000 Miles' and the ode to motherhood that was their last chart hit, the track may well rise further." Caren Myers from Melody Maker deemed it "an unsurprising single which works better as a humble track", while Paul Mathur called it the "worst track" of the album.

Pan-European magazine Music & Media named it "this spring's biggest ballad", adding, "Such symmetry between big time sensuality, kitsch, pathos and wall of sound!" Alan Jones from Music Week gave it a score of four out of five and named it Pick of the Week, writing, "Unlike Pretenders' hits of the past it is slightly formulaic but it nonetheless a seductively swaying rock anthem." People Magazine deemed it the "weakest track" of the album, describing it as "an anthem of blind support." Sandwell Evening Mail viewed it as "excellent". Paul Evans from Rolling Stone stated that Hynde "nails devotion" on the song, "and like any master, makes it all seem easy." Roy Wilkinson from Select wrote that it "may have a lighter-wielding tendency that should keep a few OPEC members smiling".

== Music video ==
A music video was produced to promote the single, directed by London-based director Zanna and produced by Deidre Allen. It takes place in an old wooden hut, featuring Hynde singing the song towards a man who is in a worried state. Throughout the video, Hynde tries to comfort and take care of him. When he arrives in the beginning, she greets him and knocks over a glass of milk before singing in his direction. It is unclear whether the man hears her or is even aware of her presence. The man, obviously worried, holds a bullet in his hand. He also looks into a map. Other times he plays with a coin or a card deck. Hynde tries to comfort him. She holds her arms around him, and also mends his clothes with needle and sewing thread. She helps him with tools when he tries to fix a machine. Later after struggling with awakening him, she carries the ill man to a bath tub, where she washes and nurses him. In the end, the man, now fully dressed again, leaves the hut, while Hynde watches him. On the table lies an ace card with a knife stuck through it. Zanna also previously directed the video for the band's previous single, "Night in My Veins".

== Legacy ==
Idolator included "I'll Stand by You" in their ranking of "The 50 Best Pop Singles of 1994" in 2014. An editor, Jonathan Riggs, said, "Regardless of how representative of Hynde's oeuvre with the Pretenders it really was, 'I'll Stand By You' continues to resonate decades later."

== Track listing ==
7-inch single, UK (1994)
No.	Title	Length
1.	"I'll Stand by You"	3:59
2.	"Rebel Rock Me"	3:08

CD single, Europe (1994)
No.	Title	Length
1.	"I'll Stand by You"	3:59
2.	"Rebel Rock Me"	3:08
3.	"Bold as Love"	3:23

CD single (CD2), Europe (1994)
No.	Title	Length
1.	"I'll Stand by You"	3:59
2.	"Message of Love"	3:24
3.	"Don't Get Me Wrong"	3:48
4.	"Brass in Pocket"	3:04

== Personnel ==
- Chrissie Hynde – guitar, vocals
- Adam Seymour – guitar

Additional musicians

- J.F.T. Hood – drums
- David Paton – bass guitar
- Tom Kelly – piano, guitar
- London Gospel Choir – choir
- David Lord – string arrangement
- Bob Clearmountain – mixing
- Tony Philips – mixing
- Steve Williams – engineer

== Charts ==
=== Weekly charts ===
Chart (1994)	Peak position
Australia (ARIA)	8
Belgium (Ultratop 50 Flanders)	7
Canada Top Singles (RPM)	12
Canada Adult Contemporary (RPM)	20
Europe (Eurochart Hot 100)	32
Europe (European AC Radio)	1
Europe (European Hit Radio)	1
France (SNEP)	29
Germany (GfK)	58
Iceland (Íslenski Listinn Topp 40)	19
Ireland (IRMA)	22
Israel (Israeli Singles Chart)	1
Italy (Musica e dischi)	8
Netherlands (Dutch Top 40)	25
Netherlands (Single Top 100)	29
New Zealand (Recorded Music NZ)	20
Scottish Singles Sales (Official Charts)	14
Sweden (Sverigetopplistan)	21
UK Singles (Official Charts)	10
UK Airplay (Music Week)	5
US Billboard Hot 100	16
US Adult Contemporary (Billboard)	21
US Adult Pop Airplay (Billboard)	23
US Alternative Airplay (Billboard)	21
US Pop Airplay (Billboard)	11

=== Year-end charts ===
Chart (1994)	Position
Australia (ARIA)	45
Belgium (Ultratop)	41
Brazil (Mais Tocadas)	37
Canada Top Singles (RPM)	88
Europe (European Hit Radio)	9
Israel (Israeli Singles Chart)	23
Netherlands (Dutch Top 40)	198
UK Singles (OCC)	93
UK Airplay (Music Week)	15

Chart (1995)	Position
US Billboard Hot 100	95

== Certifications ==
Region	Certification	Certified units/sales
Australia (ARIA)	Gold	35,000^{^}
New Zealand (RMNZ)	Platinum	30,000^{‡}
Spain (Promusicae)	Gold	30,000^{‡}
United Kingdom (BPI)	Silver	200,000^{‡}
^{^} Shipments figures based on certification alone.^{‡} Sales+streaming figures based on certification alone.

== Girls Aloud versions ==
"I'll Stand by You"

Single by Girls Aloud

from the album What Will the Neighbours Say?
- B-side: "Real Life"
- Released: November 15, 2004
- Recorded: 2004
- Length: 3:44
- Label: Polydor
- Songwriters: Chrissie Hynde; Tom Kelly; Billy Steinberg
- Producers: Brian Higgins; Xenomania

Girls Aloud singles chronology
"Love Machine" (2004)	"I'll Stand by You" (2004)	"Wake Me Up" (2005)

Audio sample
- file; help

Music video
- "I'll Stand by You" on YouTube

In 2004, British-Irish all-female pop group Girls Aloud recorded a cover of "I'll Stand by You" as the official charity single for the 2004 Children in Need fundraising campaign. Their version was produced by Brian Higgins and his production team Xenomania. The track was announced a single just ten days before its November 15, 2004, release. It became Girls Aloud's second number one on the UK Singles Chart, spending two weeks at the top position and receiving a silver certification from the British Phonographic Industry. The song appears on Girls Aloud's second studio album What Will the Neighbours Say? (2004).

The music video, directed by Trudy Bellinger, saw Girls Aloud stranded in a desert as they "stand by" each other. "I'll Stand by You" was promoted through various live appearances and has since been performed on a number of the group's concert tours. Despite its success, Girls Aloud's cover of the song was largely panned by contemporary music critics.

A new version of the song, "I'll Stand By You (Sarah's Version)", was released on the 20th anniversary of its original release on November 15, 2024. This version features lead vocals from Sarah Harding in tribute to the singer, who died in 2021.

=== Background and release ===
The first version of "I'll Stand by You" that Xenomania created was described as a "weird, modernist breakbeat version", which was scrapped upon deciding an updated version of the original song would be better suited for Children in Need. The track's release was announced a single just ten days before its release date. Nicola Roberts said, "Hopefully if our single does well it's a lot of money going to the charity."

The single was released on November 15, 2004, in the UK, the week of the Children in Need 2004 telethon. It was available on two different CD singles. The first disc includes "Real Life", a song taken from Girls Aloud's second album What Will the Neighbours Say?. The second CD format featured a medley of songs taken from the album, as well as the Tony Lamezma's Club Romp remix of the track. The Gravitas Vocal Dub Mix Edit of "I'll Stand by You" appears on the "Wake Me Up" single.

In order to promote the release, Girls Aloud toured radio stations across the United Kingdom and performed an acoustic arrangement of "I'll Stand by You" that they arranged themselves. They also visited children's hospitals.

=== Critical reception ===
Girls Aloud's version of "I'll Stand By You" was largely panned by music critics. It was called "a particular soggy area" on Girls Aloud's album. Alexis Petridis of The Guardian, who praised Girls Aloud's album, said that "I'll Stand by You" was "a thing of death-dealing tedium." BBC Music felt it was "arguable whether this cover adds much to the Pretenders' original." Sam Shepherd of musicOMH bluntly stated "perhaps the children most in need, are those that part with their pocket money for this drivel [...] This is a sub-karaoke version, limp, tired, and uninspired."

However, Stylus Magazine commended the song, comparing it to Shakespears Sister and calling it "far, far better than anyone gives it credit for."

=== Chart performance ===
"I'll Stand by You" debuted at number one on the UK Singles Chart on November 21, 2004, becoming Girls Aloud's second single to do so. Despite competition from four new top ten entries, the song also remained at the top for a second week. It slipped to number four in its third week, making way for Band Aid 20's take on "Do They Know It's Christmas?". Girls Aloud spent a fourth week in the top five. The single spent two further weeks in the top ten, holding on at number nine. Overall, "I'll Stand by You" spent fourteen weeks in the top 75, including nine weeks in the top forty. The single was ranked thirty-fourth on the year-end chart (see 2004 in British music). It was certified silver by the British Phonographic Industry. Following Sarah Harding's death in September 2021, the song had a resurgence in popularity with a surge of 1068%.

The song entered the Irish Singles Chart at number four. It spent a second week at number four, before rising to number three. It spent three more consecutive weeks at number three. It then slipped back down to number four, and spent two more weeks in the top five.

=== Music video ===
The video for Girls Aloud's version of "I'll Stand by You" was directed by Trudy Bellinger. It begins with each member of the group lying or sitting motionless in a parched desert. At the song's climax, a thunderstorm begins, and the members of Girls Aloud come together and stand in a circle. A special Children in Need version of the video depicts the group members holding "Pudsey" teddy bears, the mascot of the organisation, towards the end of the video.

=== Live performances ===
Girls Aloud toured radio stations across the United Kingdom and performed an acoustic arrangement of "I'll Stand by You" that they arranged themselves. As the charity's official single of the year, the song was showcased as the Children in Need 2004 telethon. They also performed the song on television programmes such as Blue Peter, CD:UK, Diggin' It, GMTV, Ministry of Mayhem, Popbusters, Top of the Pops, and Xchange. In 2005, Girls Aloud performed "I'll Stand by You" at Dublin's ChildLine Concert and on the TV show All Time Greatest Love Songs. In 2006, they performed the song on Australia's Sunrise. The group also performed the cover version on their 2005 MTV special (as seen on the Girls on Film DVD) and ITV1's The Girls Aloud Party (2008).

"I'll Stand by You" has been performed by Girls Aloud on most of their concert tours. For 2005's What Will the Neighbours Say...? Tour, Girls Aloud's first tour, they sang the song in colorful, simple evening gowns. It was also included on 2006's Chemistry Tour and 2007's The Greatest Hits Tour. "I'll Stand by You" was included on a ballad section on 2008's Tangled Up Tour, in which Girls Aloud walk along a catwalk which reaches the middle of the crowd.

=== Track listings and formats ===
These are the formats and track listings of major single releases of "I'll Stand by You".

UK CD1 (Polydor / 9869129)

1. "I'll Stand by You" – 3:44
2. "Real Life" – 3:41

UK CD2 (Polydor / 9869130)

1. "I'll Stand by You" – 3:44
2. "I'll Stand by You" (Tony Lamezma's Club Romp) – 5:05
3. "What Will the Neighbours Say? Album Medley" – 3:14
4. "I'll Stand by You" (video) – 3:44
5. "I'll Stand by You" (karaoke video) – 3:44
6. "I'll Stand by You" (game)

The Singles Boxset (CD7)

1. "I'll Stand by You" – 3:44
2. "Real Life" – 3:41
3. "I'll Stand by You" (Tony Lamezma's Club Romp) – 5:05
4. "What Will the Neighbours Say? Album Medley" – 3:14
5. "I'll Stand by You" (Gravitas Vocal Dub Mix) – 7:27
6. "I'll Stand by You" (video) – 3:44
7. "I'll Stand by You" (karaoke video) – 3:44
8. "I'll Stand by You" (game)
- Digital EP
1. "I'll Stand By You" – 3:43
2. "Real Life" – 3:41
3. "I'll Stand By You" (Tony Lamezma's Club Romp) – 5:06
4. "What Will The Neighbours Say Medley" – 3:13
5. "I'll Stand By You" (Gravitas Vocal Dub Mix) – 7:27

=== Personnel ===
- Nadine Coyle – co-lead vocals
- Cheryl Tweedy – co-lead vocals
- Sarah Harding – co-lead vocals
- Nicola Roberts – co-lead vocals
- Kimberley Walsh – co-lead vocals

=== Charts ===
==== Weekly charts ====
Weekly chart performance for "I'll Stand by You"
Chart (2004–2005)	Peak position
Europe (Eurochart Hot 100)	5
Ireland (IRMA)	3
Netherlands (Single Top 100)	85
Poland Airplay (Polish Airplay Charts)	2
Romania (Romanian Top 100)	55
Russia Airplay (TopHit)	82
Scottish Singles Sales (Official Charts)	1
UK Singles (Official Charts)	1
UK Airplay (Music Week)	10

Weekly chart performance for "I'll Stand by You (Sarah's Version)"
Chart (2024)	Peak position
UK Singles Downloads (Official Charts)	2

==== Year-end charts ====
Chart (2004)	Position
UK Singles (OCC)	34

=== Certifications ===
Region	Certification	Certified units/sales
United Kingdom (BPI)	Silver	200,000^{^}
^{^} Shipments figures based on certification alone.

== Carrie Underwood version ==
"I'll Stand by You"

Single by Carrie Underwood

from the album Idol Gives Back
- Released: April 24, 2007
- Length: 3:31
- Songwriters: Chrissie Hynde; Tom Kelly; Billy Steinberg
- Producers: Nigel Lythgoe; Ken Warwick; Richard Curtis

Carrie Underwood singles chronology
"Wasted" (2007)	"I'll Stand by You" (2007)	"So Small" (2007)

"I'll Stand by You" was covered in 2007 by American singer Carrie Underwood as a charity single, recorded for the American Idol special, Idol Gives Back which aired on April 25, 2007.

=== Release and promotion ===
Carrie Underwood performed the song during her visit to Africa. The song was used as the soundtrack for a video vignette where Underwood is seen singing to children and doing various activities with them. The single and the video were released on the U.S. iTunes Store on April 26, 2007. Ryan Seacrest announced that all money made on digital downloads would be donated to charity to help millions of poor children at the time.

During one of the elimination episodes of American Idol season 6, the song was used as the send-off song for contestant Phil Stacey (the first of two eliminated contestants that week) instead of Daughtry's "Home", the show's main send-off song that season. Underwood performed the song during the Idol Finale on May 23, 2007.

=== Commercial performance ===
On its first few days of release, the song sold 124,496 digital downloads, prompting a debut on the U.S. Billboard Hot 100 at number six, Underwood's highest Hot 100 position since her 2005 debut single "Inside Your Heaven", which debuted at number one.

It was eventually removed from iTunes, leading the single to have one of the biggest falls in Hot 100 history. The single collected over 300,000 digital downloads in the time it was available for download. All profits from the sale of the single were donated to charity. The single also received unsolicited airplay on U.S. country music radio stations, despite not being officially released to country radio.

=== Music video ===
The music video for the song was filmed in Africa. Underwood is seen singing to young children and helping them with different art projects, such as painting. At one point in the video, she is seen walking into a cemetery with a girl in her arms, and a boy by her hand who is carrying flowers. Underwood is also seen crying towards the end of the video when she is helping an ill person. The video was made available for download on the U.S. iTunes Store.

=== Charts ===
Chart (2007)	Peak position
Canada Hot 100 (Billboard)	10
US Billboard Hot 100	6
US Hot Country Songs (Billboard) Charted from unsolicited airplay	41

== Shakira version ==
"I'll Stand by You"

Promotional single by Shakira featuring the Roots

from the album Hope for Haiti Now
- Released: January 23, 2010
- Studio: Kaufman Astoria, Queens, New York City
- Length: 3:55
- Label: MTV
- Songwriters: Chrissie Hynde; Tom Kelly; Billy Steinberg

Colombian singer Shakira covered "I'll Stand by You" in 2010 as a promotional charity single for the Hope for Haiti Now campaign and was released on January 23, 2010, in the wake of the devastating 2010 Haiti earthquake. Recorded live on the charity telethon Hope for Haiti Now: A Global Benefit for Earthquake Relief on January 22, 2010, in New York City. She performed the song during the program, exactly before Wyclef Jean's speech and after Reese Witherspoon's call on the phone bank. The song is found on the charity benefit album, Hope for Haiti Now.

=== Track listing ===
Album version

1. " I'll Stand by You" (with the Roots)- 3:55

=== Charts ===
Chart (2010)	Peak position
Sweden (Sverigetopplistan)	53

== Other notable covers ==
For BBC Children in Need in 2014, 1,685 children sang the song live in unison live from 10 towns across the UK. The choirs performed the song and starting in the studio it cut between the choirs, in real time, giving each choir about 15–20 seconds on air. The choirs sang from: Elstree at Elstree Studios the studio just outside London where the main telethon was held, Bradford at Bradford College, Norwich at The Millennium Library in The Forum, Newport at The Newport Centre, Birmingham at Think Tank, Belfast at BBC Blackstaff House, Plymouth at Plymouth Life Centre, Blackpool at The Blackpool Tower Circus, Chatham at Chatham Historic Dockyard and Glasgow at BBC Pacific Quay

The song was also covered by Finn Hudson in Glee, which charted on the Billboard Hot 100 the week the episode it was featured in came out. It was covered again in a tribute to the character of Finn Hudson after the passing of actor Cory Monteith by Mercedes Jones (Amber Riley) in the show's fifth season.
