= The Girls Aloud Show =

2024 concert tour by Girls Aloud

- Tour by Girls Aloud
- Promotional poster
- Location: Ireland; United Kingdom
- Start date: 17 May 2024
- End date: 30 June 2024
- No. of shows: 30

Girls Aloud concert chronology
- Ten: The Hits Tour (2013); The Girls Aloud Show (2024)

The Girls Aloud Show was the seventh concert tour by English-Irish girl group Girls Aloud, with 30 shows across Ireland and United Kingdom. The tour marked the group's first tour since 2013's Ten: The Hits and their first as a quartet, following the death of Sarah Harding in 2021. It was the biggest UK arena tour of 2024, playing to over 300,000 people.

The tour commenced on 17 May 2024 in Dublin, Ireland and concluded on 30 June of the same year, in Liverpool, England. Group members Cheryl Tweedy, Nadine Coyle, Nicola Roberts and Kimberley Walsh have described the tour as a "celebration of Sarah, our music and our incredible fans." A one-hour special,The Girls Aloud Show: Live at The O2, aired 17 November 2024 on ITV1.

== Background ==
Girls Aloud — composed of Nadine Coyle, Sarah Harding, Nicola Roberts, Cheryl Tweedy and Kimberley Walsh — was formed on reality TV show Popstars: The Rivals in 2002, going on to achieve 20 consecutive top ten hits before taking a hiatus in 2009. The group eventually reformed in 2012 to mark their ten-year anniversary with the release of "Something New" and greatest hits album Ten, before embarking on their Ten: The Hits Tour; the group disbanded following the conclusion of the tour. In August 2020, Harding announced she had been diagnosed with breast cancer, which had spread to other parts of her body; Harding died in September 2021. In October 2022, the remaining members came together to raise funds and awareness of breast cancer in honour of Harding. In April 2023, Walsh described themselves as "really as tight as we've ever been at the moment" in the wake of Harding's death.

On 22 November, it was announced the group would tour in 2024, in "celebration of Sarah, our music & our incredible fans". Eight days later, eight additional dates were added, followed by an additional London date in December.

In an interview with British Vogue, the group announced they would not be releasing new music, stating it was "because Sarah wouldn't be included in that newness." In an interview with Virgin Radio, the group revealed initial discussions to celebrate their twentieth anniversary had begun several years prior, but had stalled following Harding's diagnosis, revealing that "all priorities changed". That December, an additional date in London date was announced.

== Critical reception ==
In her review of the tour's opening concert in Dublin on 17 May 2024, Zara Hedderman of The Guardian noted that Girls Aloud are "a glorious pop institution still calling the shots." Alluding to Harding's passing, she further wrote: "Old lyrics now have new poignancy – but with motorbikes and mic-stand moves, the mood stays upbeat [...] Euphoric cheers are constant, reaching an apex for a singalong to "I’ll Stand By You" and a confetti shower for "Jump." But the biggest reception is saved for the encore of "The Promise," a song with a sparkle that – much like the tenacious and tender group singing it – has never dimmed." Daily Telegraph critic Neil McCormick found that "these women have got qualities their younger selves would struggle to match: experience, loyalty, the sheer life-affirming delight of being able to stand onstage and sing to remind themselves and their fans that we are still here, and to celebrate those who aren’t." Ed Power from The Times called the show a "ferociously enjoyable, and a heartfelt tribute."

Una Mullally, writing for The Irish Times, felt that "this tour could have been framed as a nostalgia-fest, a chance to revisit some of the best pop hits of the early 21st century, or an all-out dance party. It’s all of those things, but also a touching tribute to their bandmate. Ultimately, the decision to lean into commemoration over commodification demonstrates an unexpected authenticity." Irish Independent's Barry Egan praised Girls Aloud for giving "the crowd exactly what they want, hit after hit with nothing but brilliance." He noted that "although most of us are aware of the fragility of life, sometimes it takes a pop song to make us really understand how lucky we are — and realise what impermanent creatures we are, too. That pop song was "Whole Lotta History," performed by Girls Aloud to a sold out 3Arena last night in Dublin."

== Broadcast and recordings ==
On 14 October 2024, it was announced one of the London concerts at the O_{2} Arena was filmed for ITV1 and ITVX, and will feature "sneak peeks behind-the-scenes" and air as a one-hour special. The special, billed as The Girls Aloud Show: Live at the O2, aired on 17 November 2024, which would have been Harding's 43rd birthday.

On 27 March 2025, a Blu-ray physical release of the concert film was announced for 13 June, distributed by Mercury Studios. Additionally, a deluxe box set was announced, including the previously announced Blu-ray, DVD, and 2CDs, housed in a 62-page rainbow foil hardback photo book package, which will also feature exclusive photos and extensive sleeve notes in relation to the tour. Other special features include multiple screen visuals from the tour, as well as the Sarah's version of the "I'll Stand by You" music video. Upon its release, it impacted several UK Video Charts, including: number one on the Official Blu-ray Chart and Official Music Video Chart, the latter of which it spent three consecutive weeks at the top position. On the Official Video Chart, it peaked at number four.

== Set list ==
This set list is from the 17 May 2024 concert in Dublin.

1. "Untouchable"
2. "The Show"
3. "Something New"
4. "Love Machine"
5. "Can't Speak French"
6. "Biology"
7. "Whole Lotta History"
8. "Wake Me Up"
9. "Sound of the Underground"
10. "Girl Overboard"
11. "No Good Advice"
12. "Graffiti My Soul"
13. "Long Hot Summer"
14. "I'll Stand by You"
15. "Sexy! No No No..."
16. "On the Metro"
17. "Jump"
18. "Call the Shots"
19. "Something Kinda Ooooh"
20. "The Promise"

== Tour dates ==
List of 2024 concerts
Date (2024)	City	Country	Venue
17 May	Dublin	Ireland	3Arena
18 May	Dublin	Ireland	3Arena
20 May	Belfast	Northern Ireland	SSE Arena
21 May	Belfast	Northern Ireland	SSE Arena
23 May	Manchester	England	AO Arena
24 May	Manchester	England	AO Arena
25 May	Manchester	England	AO Arena
27 May	Cardiff	Wales	Utilita Arena
28 May	Sheffield	England	Utilita Arena
31 May	Newcastle	England	Utilita Arena
1 June	Newcastle	England	Utilita Arena
2 June	Newcastle	England	Utilita Arena
4 June	Aberdeen	Scotland	P&J Live
8 June	Glasgow	Scotland	OVO Hydro
9 June	Glasgow	Scotland	OVO Hydro
10 June	Glasgow	Scotland	OVO Hydro
12 June	Nottingham	England	Motorpoint Arena
13 June	Nottingham	England	Motorpoint Arena
15 June	Leeds	England	First Direct Arena
16 June	Leeds	England	First Direct Arena
18 June	Birmingham	England	Resorts World Arena
19 June	Birmingham	England	Resorts World Arena
20 June	Birmingham	England	Resorts World Arena
22 June	London	England	The O_{2} Arena
23 June	London	England	The O_{2} Arena
25 June	London	England	The O_{2} Arena
26 June	London	England	The O_{2} Arena
27 June	London	England	The O_{2} Arena
29 June	Liverpool	England	M&S Bank Arena
30 June	Liverpool	England	M&S Bank Arena
