= On the Metro =

Song by Girls Aloud

from the album Ten
- Released: 26 November 2012
- Recorded: May 2012
- Genre: Dance-pop; EDM; techno pop
- Length: 3:15
- Label: Polydor
- Songwriters: Nicola Roberts; Jason Pebworth; George Astasio; Shave; Dan Stein
- Producers: The Invisible Men; DJ Fresh

"On the Metro" is a song by British-Irish pop group Girls Aloud, recorded and taken from their second greatest hits compilation Ten (2012). The song was written by Girls Aloud member Nicola Roberts, along with its producers Jason Pebworth, George Astasio, Shave and Dan Stein, otherwise known by The Invisible Men and DJ Fresh.

The song is a dance-pop song, which is influenced by progressive house music and J-pop. The song was acclaimed by contemporary music critics.

== Background and composition ==
The group's second compilation album, Ten, was the first record to be released by the group since their hiatus in 2008. Before then, the group signed a 3-album deal with Fascination Records in February 2009. The group were required to record new material in 2010, but this failed to go forth.

The song was written by Girls Aloud member Nicola Roberts, along with Jason Pebworth, George Astasio, Shave and Dan Stein, while production was handled by The Invisible Men and DJ Fresh. Along with the song "Beautiful 'Cause You Love Me", with the inclusion of both tracks makes Ten the first album since their debut, Sound of the Underground, not to be produced exclusively by Xenomania. After its release with Ten, fellow member Kimberley Walsh tweeted her praise for Roberts for writing the song, stating "So happy you all like #OnTheMetro !!! Our very own @nicolaroberts is a very talented songwriter #proud". Musically wise, the song was described as a "J-Pop with trance synths and sub-bass in their typically OTT manner [...]" Andy Kellman from Allmusic felt the musical composition was "sleek and speedy".

== Critical reception ==
"On the Metro" received critical acclaim from contemporary music critics. With the headline describing the song as "Unparalleled Amazingness", Bradley Stern from MuuMuse gave it a positive remark describing the song as "better electro-pop perfection" and said "“On The Metro” is a 100% flaw-free dance-pop tune. It plays like a cross between the ferocity of “Memory of You” and Mini Viva's “Left My Heart In Tokyo.” A reviewer from The Reflective Inklings awarded the song five-out-of-five stars, stating "On The Metro [...] will instantly wow the listener with the song’s smart electropop gloss doing what it is supposed to do. The chorus packs a whole lot of conviction and is one of the song’s strongest suits." Ian Wade from BBC Music described the song as an "raving-through-the-tears amazingness."

Robert Corpsey of Digital Spy believed that along with "Every Now and Then", the song would prove "the prospect of a new Girls Aloud album in 2013 would be a very exciting one indeed." He also highlighted the song as an album standout. A reviewer from So So Gay believed that "On the Metro" and "Every Now and Then" are far more standard Girls Aloud fare.

== Live performances ==
In 2013, the song was performed by Girls Aloud on the Ten: The Hits Tour. The song is also included in the setlist for their 2024 tour The Girls Aloud Show.

== Format and track listing ==
Digital download

1. "On the Metro" – 3:15
