= Sarah Harding =

English singer, model, and actress (1981–2021)

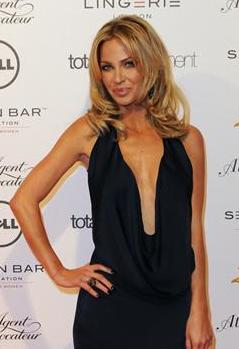
- Harding in 2012
- Born: Sarah Nicole Hardman; 17 November 1981; Ascot, Berkshire, England
- Died: 5 September 2021 (aged 39); Manchester, England
- Occupations: Singer; model; actress
- Years active: 1993–2021
- Musical career
- Genres: Pop; pop rock; dance-pop
- Instrument: Vocals
- Labels: Polydor; Fascination; Decca
- Formerly of: Girls Aloud

Sarah Harding (born Sarah Nicole Hardman; 17 November 1981 – 5 September 2021) was an English singer, model, and actress. Her professional career began in 2002 when she successfully auditioned for the ITV reality series Popstars: The Rivals, during which Harding won a place in the girl group Girls Aloud. The group achieved twenty consecutive top ten singles (including four number ones) in the UK, six albums that were certified platinum by the British Phonographic Industry (BPI), two of which went to number one in the UK, and accumulated a total of five BRIT Award nominations. In 2009, Girls Aloud won "Best Single" with their song "The Promise". As an actress, she appeared on many television series and films, including St Trinian's, St Trinian's 2: The Legend of Fritton's Gold, Run for Your Wife and Coronation Street.

During the group's break, Harding began acting, appearing in Bad Day, the BBC television film Freefall, Run for Your Wife and St. Trinian's 2: The Legend of Fritton's Gold. Harding contributed three solo songs to the soundtrack of St. Trinian's 2. She also modelled for Ultimo lingerie. In late 2012, she reunited with Girls Aloud to celebrate their tenth anniversary. In early 2013, they announced that they had split up. In 2015, Harding briefly appeared in the soap opera Coronation Street and released her first extended play record Threads. She then won Celebrity Big Brother 20 in 2017.

In August 2020, Harding announced that she had been diagnosed with advanced breast cancer; she revealed in March 2021 that her condition was terminal. She died on 5 September 2021, at the age of 39.

== Early life ==
Harding was born as Sarah Nicole Hardman on 17 November 1981 in Ascot, Berkshire. She attended St Cuthbert's Primary School in Egham until 1993. She was raised with two half brothers and moved to Stockport when she was 14 after her parents' separation. Harding's father had begun dating a younger woman, she therefore disowned her father and changed her surname to Harding. She attended Hazel Grove High School from 1993 to 1998 and later attended Stockport College where she studied hair and beauty. She then worked as part of the promotions team for two nightclubs in The Grand Central Leisure Park in Stockport, as a waitress at Pizza Hut, a van driver, debt collector and as a BT telephone operator. She also toured North West England performing at pubs, social clubs and caravan parks to support herself. In 2002, she was recording dance tracks when she decided to audition for UK talent-search shows. She auditioned for Fame Academy and Popstars: The Rivals. It was in the latter on which she found fame, pulling out of Fame Academy after being accepted into the first round of Popstars. Harding also entered FHM's High Street Honeys 2002, the magazine's national beauty contest. Her pictures appeared in the top 100, but Harding withdrew upon achieving success on Popstars.

== Career ==
=== 2002–2009: Popstars: The Rivals and Girls Aloud ===
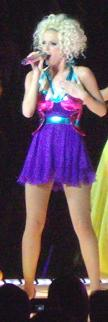
Harding performing with Girls Aloud at the O2 in London in 2008

In 2002, Harding auditioned for the reality television show Popstars: The Rivals. The programme, the second British series of the international Popstars franchise, would see the creation of two rival groups – a boy band and a girl group each consisting of five members, which would then compete against each other for the 2002 Christmas Number One spot on the UK Singles Chart. Several thousand applicants attended auditions across the UK in hope of being selected. Ten girls and ten boys were chosen as finalists by judges Pete Waterman, Louis Walsh and Geri Halliwell. These finalists then took to the stage participating in weekly Saturday night live performances (alternating weekly between the girls and boys). Each week the contestant polling the fewest phone votes was eliminated, until the final line-ups of the groups emerged. Harding joined Nadine Coyle, Cheryl Tweedy, Nicola Roberts and Kimberley Walsh to comprise the new girl group Girls Aloud, formed through the show by a public vote on 30 November 2002.

The group's debut single "Sound of the Underground" peaked at number one on the UK Singles Chart, becoming the 2002 Christmas number one. Girls Aloud hold the record for the shortest time between formation and reaching number one. The group released their debut album Sound of the Underground in May 2003, which entered the charts at number two and was certified platinum by the British Phonographic Industry (BPI) later the same year. Their singles "I'll Stand by You", "Walk This Way" and "The Promise" have charted at number one. Two of their albums have reached the top of the UK Albums Chart: their greatest hits album The Sound of Girls Aloud and 2008's Out of Control, both of which entered the chart at number one, with over one million copies of the former being sold. They also achieved seven certified albums and have been nominated for five Brit Awards, winning the 2009 Best Single for "The Promise".

The group's musical style was pop, but throughout their career, they experimented with electropop and dance-pop. Girls Aloud's collaborations with Brian Higgins and his songwriting and production team Xenomania earned the group critical acclaim, due to an innovative approach to mainstream pop music. The group became one of the few UK reality television acts to achieve continued success, amassing a fortune of £30 million by May 2010. Guinness World Records lists them as "Most Successful Reality TV Group" in the 2007 edition. They also hold the record for "Most Consecutive Top Ten Entries in the UK by a Female Group" in the 2008 edition and are credited again for "Most Successful Reality TV Group" in the 2011 edition. The group was also named the United Kingdom's biggest-selling girl group of the 21st century, with over 4.3 million singles sales and 4 million albums sold in the UK alone.

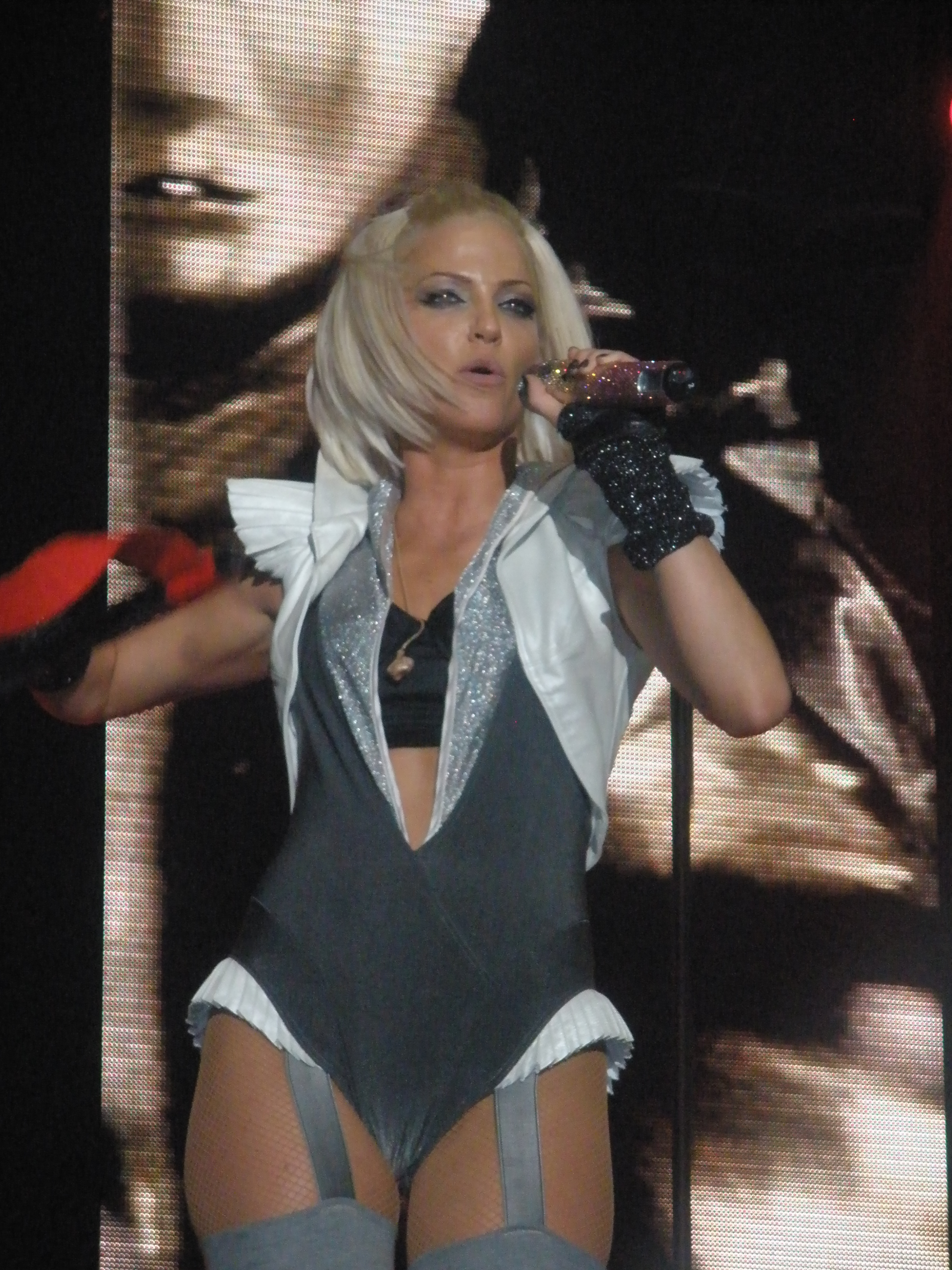
Harding performing with Girls Aloud as part of their Out of Control tour in 2009

In 2006, Harding signed a £100,000 deal to model Ultimo lingerie, following the likes of Penny Lancaster, Rachel Hunter and Helena Christensen. Alongside her Girls Aloud bandmates, Harding made a cameo appearance in St. Trinian's in 2007. She took on her first major acting role in 2008, appearing in the low-budget thriller Bad Day. Harding wore a brunette wig for the role of Jade Jennings. The film also stars Donna Air and Claire Goose. She also collaborated with London synthpop band Filthy Dukes on a cover of "Real Wild Child", recorded for the film Wild Child. In July 2009, Girls Aloud announced they would take a year-long hiatus to pursue solo projects, but would reunite for a new studio album in 2010.

During Girls Aloud's hiatus, Harding decided to focus on her acting career. "Singing was always my main ambition, but acting was something else I wanted to achieve", Harding said. Harding appeared in the BBC television film Freefall, written and directed by Dominic Savage. The film aired on BBC Two on 14 July 2009. Harding portrayed Sam, the beautician girlfriend of Dominic Cooper's character. The drama is a satirical take on the 2008 financial crisis. Company magazine said that "Sarah Harding showed she's got real acting potential in her convincing, but fleeting performance."

Later that year, Harding returned to the St. Trinian's franchise with a starring role in St. Trinian's 2: The Legend of Fritton's Gold. Despite her age, Harding portrayed teenage rebel Roxy, a new student at St. Trinian's School. The film received overwhelmingly negative reviews, holding a 10% 'rotten' rating on Rotten Tomatoes. Harding worked with Girls Aloud producers Xenomania to record three solo tracks for the film's soundtrack – "Too Bad", "Make It Easy" and a cover of David Bowie's "Boys Keep Swinging".

=== 2009–2015: Reunion with Girls Aloud, disbandment and acting ===
In December 2009, Harding appeared on MTV's Sarah Harding in 24 Hours. Harding and her then-boyfriend, DJ Tom Crayne, also launched a new nightclub named Kanaloa. Harding's guest vocals appear alongside Kanobby on the Roger Sanchez and Far East Movement track "2Gether"; she also appears in snippets of the music video. Harding then filmed Run for Your Wife in which she played one of the wives of the lead character, John Smith. The film was released on 14 February 2013.

After three years of hiatus, Girls Aloud reunited in 2012 to celebrate their tenth anniversary together. The group released the single "Something New" in November, with proceeds being donated to Children in Need. Their second greatest hits anthology Ten was released on 26 November 2012, followed by the single "Beautiful Cause You Love Me". In 2013, the group embarked on Ten: The Hits Tour. Shortly after the tour, the group announced their split.

Harding first revealed that she was working on her debut album in March 2010. She named Lady Gaga as her biggest influence. Despite this, an album never materialised. Harding restated her plans to release a solo album in 2013 and said that she had been "writing and experimenting with different sounds in the studio." In an interview in 2014. She said, "I'm doing all sorts of stuff at the moment [...] A lot of it is music, music, music.". In July 2015 her first solo release, "Threads", was announced; it was released on 7 August.

She made a guest appearance on the ITV soap opera Coronation Street as Joni Preston, the wife of Robert Preston (Tristan Gemmill). The character made a few appearances in July and August 2015 as her marriage to Robert disintegrated when he began an affair with ex-wife Tracy Barlow (Kate Ford).

In 2014, Harding competed on the BBC's Saturday night gymnastics show Tumble, in which she came third. She also participated in season 10 of BBC's Celebrity MasterChef in 2015.

On 16 August 2015, Harding released her debut single, "Threads". It debuted and peaked at number 2 on the UK Physical Singles Chart, one week later.

=== 2016–2021: Final projects ===
Harding took part on the third series of The Jump on Channel 4 in early 2016, withdrawing on 26 February (Week 5) after tearing a ligament in her knee during a training session. In Autumn 2016, Harding appeared alongside Andy Moss in a UK tour of Ghost: The Musical. However, she was replaced mid-tour by Carolyn Maitland after pulling out due to the subsequent pain from her injury after The Jump. In August 2017, Harding won the twentieth series of Celebrity Big Brother.

On 18 March 2021, Harding released a memoir, Hear Me Out, documenting her life and career as well as her cancer diagnosis.

On 24 March 2021, Harding released her final single, "Wear It Like a Crown", which she had recorded ten years earlier. However, she had found it and decided to release it with the profits going towards her chosen charity. The same day, the song went straight to number 1 on the iTunes chart. Although the single failed to chart on the UK Official Singles Top 100, it debuted and peaked at number 30 on the UK Official Singles Downloads Chart Top 100 on 2 April 2021.

=== Posthumous releases ===
In November 2024, Girls Aloud released "I'll Stand By You (Sarah's Version)" in aid of that year's Children in Need. The single features previously unreleased vocals from Harding, singing the lead in the verses. An official music video premiered on the same day as the single's release.

== Personal life ==
Harding was in an on-and-off relationship with Calum Best from 2005 to 2006. They remained friends until her death. Harding was engaged to DJ Tom Crane during 2011. She was also in a two-year relationship with DJ Mark Foster from late 2012 to late 2014. She also began a relationship with Celebrity Big Brother co-star Chad Johnson during their series of the programme. After the pair had finished the series, they had a brief long-distance relationship but ended it, remaining friends until her death. Following her death, Johnson said that he felt sad that Harding had never been able to fulfil her dream of becoming a mother.

In October 2011, Harding entered a rehab centre in South Africa, citing alcohol dependence and depression. She did not stop drinking alcohol altogether, but "reined it in". On 16 April 2013, Harding received a six-month driving ban and was fined £605 after police officers caught her talking on her mobile phone while she was driving through central London. Harding had nine penalty points on her licence for speeding prior to the incident.

Harding wrote a memoir, Hear Me Out, which was published in 2021, documenting her life and career as well as her terminal diagnosis.

== Illness and death ==
On 26 August 2020, Harding announced that she had been diagnosed with breast cancer that had advanced to "other parts" of her body. In October 2020, it was reported that she was living with her mother in Manchester upon undergoing treatment. In March 2021, she stated that the disease was terminal and that she did not expect to "see another Christmas".

Harding died of complications from breast cancer on the morning of 5 September 2021, at the age of 39. Among those who paid tributes were the other members of Girls Aloud: Nadine Coyle and Nicola Roberts said they were "absolutely devastated"; Kimberley Walsh added that her "heart was broken"; and Cheryl stated that Harding would be "forever in [their] hearts". A number of celebrities took to their social media and also paid tribute to Harding. The proceeds from Harding's final single, "Wear It Like a Crown", were donated to The Christie NHS Foundation Trust, which manages the Christie Hospital to fund research by the cancer treatment centre caring for Harding prior to her death.

== Discography ==
=== Extended plays ===
Title	EP details
Threads	Released: 7 August 2015; Label: Underdog Management Limited; Formats: digital download

=== Singles ===
Title	Year	Chart positions	Album
Title	Year	UK Digital	Album
"Threads"	2015	— (Note: "Threads" did not enter the UK Singles Chart, but debuted and peaked at number 2 on the UK Physical Singles Chart.)	Threads
"Wear It Like a Crown"	2021	30	Non-album single

=== Other appearances ===
List of non-single guest appearances
Title	Year	Album	Notes
"Real Wild Child"	2008	Wild Child (soundtrack)	A cover of Johnny O'Keefe's song.
"Too Bad"	2009	St. Trinian's 2: The Legend of Fritton's Gold (soundtrack)	
"Make It Easy"	2009	St. Trinian's 2: The Legend of Fritton's Gold (soundtrack)	
"Boys Keep Swinging"	2009	St. Trinian's 2: The Legend of Fritton's Gold (soundtrack)	A cover of David Bowie's song.
"2gether" (Roger Sanchez and Far East Movement featuring Kanobby)	2011	Free Wired	Harding provided uncredited guest vocals. She also appeared in the music video.

== Filmography ==
Year	Title	Role	Notes	Ref
2002	Popstars: The Rivals	Herself	Contestant	
2005	Girls Aloud: Home Truths	Herself	Documentary	
2006	Girls Aloud: Off the Record	Herself	Documentary	
2007	St Trinian's	School Band Member	Cameo	
2007	The Sunday Night Project	Herself/co-presenter	Christmas special	
2008	Bad Day	Jade Jennings	Supporting role	
2008	The Passions of Girls Aloud	Herself	Documentary	
2008	The Girls Aloud Party	Herself/co-presenter	ITV Music Special	
2009	Freefall	Sam	Television film; supporting role	
2009	St Trinian's 2: The Legend of Fritton's Gold	Roxy	Main role	
2009	Sarah Harding: In 24 Hours	Herself	Television film; documentary	
2011	Dating in the Dark	Presenter	Game show	
2012	Girls Aloud: Ten Years at the Top	Herself	Documentary	
2012	Run for Your Wife	Stephanie Smith	Main role	
2012	Don't Stop Me Now	Guest judge	Episode 7	
2014	The Voice of Ireland	Herself	Bressie's adviser during "battles" round; series 3	
2014	Tumble	Herself	Contestant; runner-up	
2015	Celebrity MasterChef	Herself	Contestant; series 10	
2015	Coronation Street	Joni Preston	5 episodes	
2016	The Jump	Herself	Contestant; withdrew	
2017	Celebrity Big Brother 20	Herself	Winner	
2020	Coronation Street: Compilations	Joni Preston	Archive footage	

== See also ==
- List of Celebrity Big Brother (British TV series) housemates

== Notes ==
Preceded by Coleen Nolan	Celebrity Big Brother UK winner Series 20 (2017)	Succeeded by Courtney Act
