= Ten: The Hits Tour =

2013 concert tour by Girls Aloud

- Tour by Girls Aloud
- Promotional poster for the tour
- Location: United Kingdom
- Associated album: Ten
- Start date: 21 February 2013
- End date: 20 March 2013
- Legs: 1
- No. of shows: 20
- Box office: US$13.5 million

Girls Aloud concert chronology
- Out of Control Tour (2009); Ten: The Hits Tour (2013); The Girls Aloud Show (2024)

Ten: The Hits Tour (also known as The 10th Anniversary Tour) was the sixth concert tour by British-Irish girl group Girls Aloud in support of the greatest hits album Ten (2012). It was the group's first tour in four years, following a three-year hiatus. The tour ranked on Pollstar's annual "Top 100 Mid Year Worldwide Tours". It earned £7.8m ($13.5m) from 20 shows. This was the group's last tour to feature Sarah Harding due to her death in September 2021.

== Background ==
Following their Out of Control Tour in 2009, Girls Aloud announced they would take a year-long hiatus before returning for a new album in 2010. The plans never came to be. On 19 October 2012, they held a press conference where they announced their reunion and their plans to release a "greatest hits" album, Ten, in November, followed by a tour in early 2013. The tour's first fourteen dates in the United Kingdom and Ireland were announced the same day. Due to popular demand, extra dates were added in London, Birmingham, Newcastle, Glasgow, Manchester, Belfast and Dublin.

== Critical reception ==
Kate Mossman of The Guardian wrote "Girls Aloud are still a formidable pop engine – 10 legs and a beat – with a natural sense of economy, which extends to their emotions on stage. Maybe if the farewells – such as they are – come from the less powerful members then they might be easier to go back on." Joanne Dorken said in her review for MTV "Girls Aloud's tour had it all – tears and emotions, mixed with glitter and sparkle, proving that these girls are definitely the leaders of the pack and know how to put on an impressive show." Diane Bourne wrote for the Manchester Evening News "Sadly, by the end, with group hugs and teary eyes from the girls, you get the sense that this tenth anniversary tour is a farewell, rather than a comeback. But with such palpable love from this audience, you certainly wouldn't bet against their return again. Just don't wait another ten girls..." Simon Gallagher from WhatCulture! wrote "If this is indeed the end, and the tearful goodbyes (especially from hometown girl Cheryl [Cole]) would suggest so, the world of pop will be missing one of its crown jewels. And while there are now some new girl groups on the block, there are very few out there, whether "manufactured" or otherwise, who can match Girls Aloud for their performance or the staging of their tours." Andre Paine wrote for The Evening Standard "Crucially, they also liked their fans and got up close to the crowd after being transported to the middle of the venue for a sequence including the bracing electropop tune "Call the Shots". "The Promise" was a rousing finale to a celebration of their first 10 years — a lifetime in pop, yet Girls Aloud looked like a group in their prime and hungry for hits."

== Broadcast and recordings ==
The shows in London on 1 and 2 March 2013 were recorded for a DVD release. It was broadcast on MTV freeview channel Viva on Saturday 30 March 2013. The show was then repeated on MTV Music and MTV Live HD the following day. The broadcast omitted two songs, "Call Me Maybe" and "Beautiful 'Cause You Love Me". A DVD titled Ten – The Hits Tour featuring the full-length show except "Call Me Maybe" was released on 11 November 2013.

== Set list ==
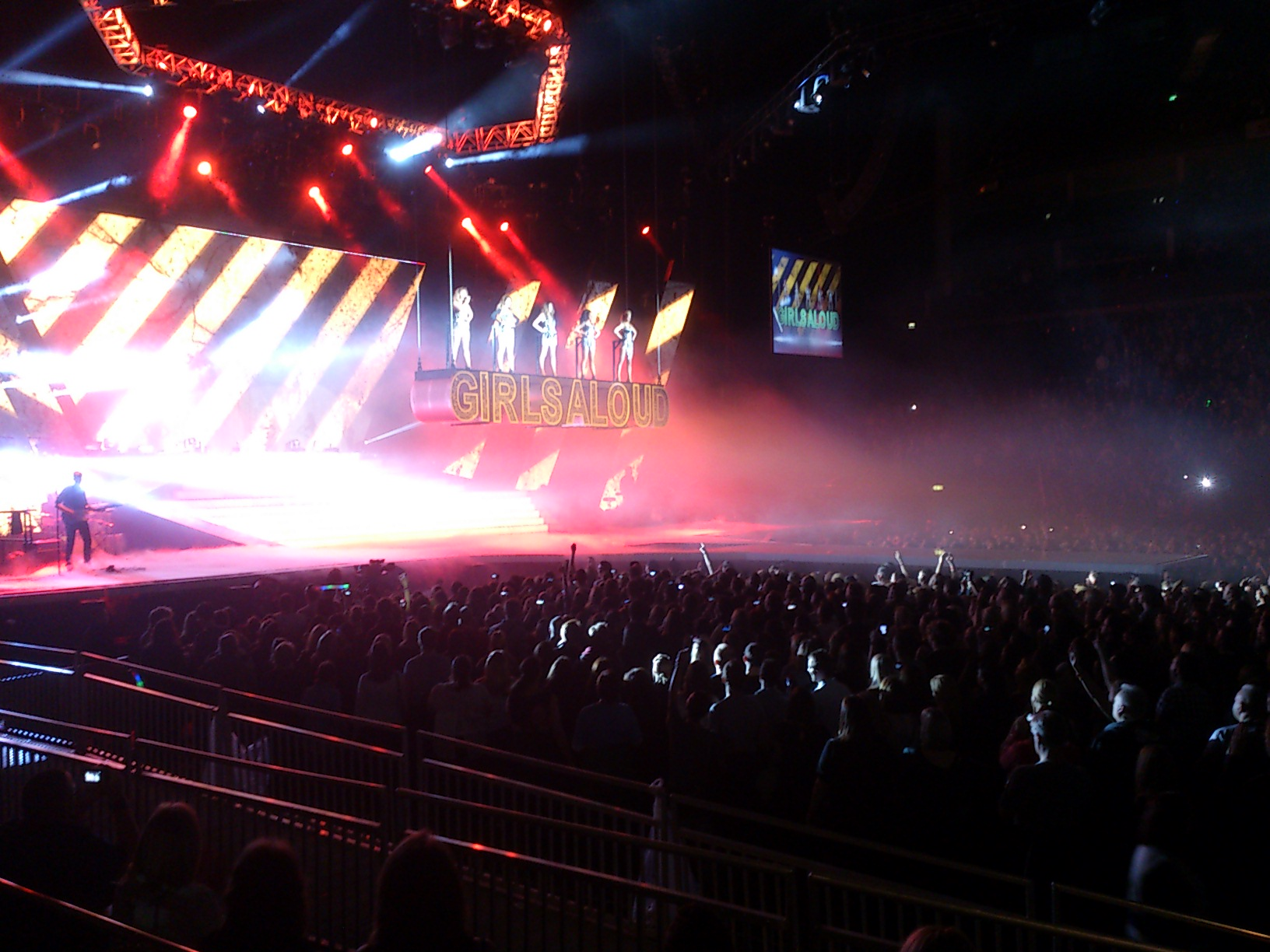
Girls Aloud performing "Sound of the Underground" in London

Section 1

1. "Sound of the Underground"
2. "No Good Advice"
3. "Life Got Cold"
4. "Wake Me Up"
5. "Jump"

Section 2

6. "The Show" (Contains elements of "Models")
7. "Love Machine"
8. "Whole Lotta History"
9. "Can't Speak French"
10. "Biology"

Section 3

11. "Sexy! No No No..."
12. "Untouchable"
13. "On the Metro"
14. "Call the Shots"

Section 4

15. "Something Kinda Ooooh"
16. "Call Me Maybe" (Carly Rae Jepsen cover)
17. "Beautiful 'Cause You Love Me"
18. "Something New"

Encore

19. "I'll Stand by You"
20. "The Promise"

== Tour dates ==
Date	City	Country	Venue	Opening Act
21 February 2013	Newcastle	England	Metro Radio Arena	Amelia Lily
22 February 2013	Newcastle	England	Metro Radio Arena	Amelia Lily
23 February 2013	Newcastle	England	Metro Radio Arena	Amelia Lily
25 February 2013	Sheffield	England	Motorpoint Arena	Amelia Lily
26 February 2013	Birmingham	England	LG Arena	Amelia Lily
27 February 2013	Birmingham	England	LG Arena	Amelia Lily
1 March 2013	London	England	The O_{2} Arena	Amelia Lily
2 March 2013	London	England	The O_{2} Arena	Amelia Lily
3 March 2013	London	England	The O_{2} Arena	Amelia Lily
5 March 2013	Manchester	England	Manchester Arena	Amelia Lily
6 March 2013	Manchester	England	Manchester Arena	Amelia Lily
7 March 2013	Manchester	England	Manchester Arena	Amelia Lily
9 March 2013	Glasgow	Scotland	SECC Concert Hall 4	Amelia Lily
10 March 2013	Glasgow	Scotland	SECC Concert Hall 4	Amelia Lily
11 March 2013	Glasgow	Scotland	SECC Concert Hall 4	Amelia Lily
13 March 2013	Belfast	Northern Ireland	Odyssey Arena	Amelia Lily
14 March 2013	Belfast	Northern Ireland	Odyssey Arena	Amelia Lily
16 March 2013	Dublin	Ireland	The O_{2}	Amelia Lily
19 March 2013	Nottingham	England	Capital FM Arena	Amelia Lily
20 March 2013	Liverpool	England	Echo Arena	Amelia Lily

Cancellations and rescheduled shows

17 March 2013

Dublin, Ireland

The O2

Cancelled due to transportation issues.

== Notes ==
- Data from study is collected from all worldwide concerts held between 1 January and 30 June 2012. All monetary figures are based in U.S. dollars. All information is based upon extensive research conducted by Pollstar.
