= Christmas 'Round at Ours =

2025 Christmas album from Girls Aloud

- Official cover art

Compilation album by Girls Aloud
- Released: 23 October 2025
- Recorded: September 2005
- Studio: Xenomania
- Genre: Christmas; dance-pop; pop
- Length: 35:23 (digital download and streaming); 31:57 (physical editions)
- Label: Fascination; Universal Music Group
- Producer: Xenomania

Girls Aloud chronology
Ten (2012)	Christmas 'Round at Ours (2025)

Christmas 'Round at Ours is a compilation album of Christmas songs by the English-Irish girl group Girls Aloud. First released digitally on 23 October 2025, it serves as a standalone release of the bonus disc of Christmas songs included with the deluxe edition of their third studio album, Chemistry, originally released on 5 December 2005.

The collection was released as a standalone album for the first time on streaming services and as a digital download on 23 October 2025, with CD and red vinyl formats following on 14 November 2025. The new release by Fascination Records and Universal Music Group features remastered audio, new sleeve notes, archival photos, and a previously unreleased remix, "Not Tonight Santa (Christmas Party Mix)", with the digital and streaming versions also including a radio edit of this mix.

Cheryl Tweedy noted that the album was always intended to be titled Christmas 'Round at Ours, which inspired the "At home with Girls Aloud" theme of their Christmas TV advertisement that year. However, the title was ultimately left off the original 2005 release to avoid confusion, as it was only available as a bonus disc.

== Background and recording ==
According to band member Kimberley Walsh, the idea for a Christmas release came from their producer, Brian Higgins of Xenomania, as they were finalizing the Chemistry album. The record label expanded on the idea, suggesting a full Christmas album be packaged with Chemistry as a deluxe edition.

The project had a very short turnaround. Nicola Roberts recalled that the group had only one week to record the entire album. During that time, the group recorded four classic Christmas covers while the Xenomania team wrote four original Christmas songs. Roberts noted that the group chose to cover "Jingle Bell Rock" because of its use in the 2004 film, Mean Girls. While the group recorded the covers, songwriters Miranda Cooper and Lisa Cowling wrote the four original Christmas songs in a single weekend." For the album's credits, the production team used festive pseudonyms: Brian Higgins was credited as "S. Claws", Miranda Cooper as "Holly Bush", Lisa Cowling as "Beth Lehem", Tim Larcombe as "Yuell Logg", Shawn Lee as "Henry Mistletoe", and Tim "Rolf" Coler as "Festiv Gifts".

The cover image, shot on the same day as the cover image for Chemistry, was later celebrated by the National Portrait Gallery in London during Christmas 2023.

== Music and composition ==
The album consists of eight tracks, evenly split between four original songs and four covers of Christmas standards. The original tracks, all written and produced by Xenomania, include "Christmas 'Round at Ours", "I Wanna Kiss You So (Christmas in a Nutshell)", "Count the Days", and "Not Tonight Santa".

The four covers are "I Wish It Could Be Christmas Everyday" (originally by Wizzard), "Jingle Bell Rock" (originally by Bobby Helms), "Merry Xmas Everybody" (originally by Slade), and "White Christmas" (originally by Bing Crosby). The group had previously performed "White Christmas" during the final of their formation show, Popstars: The Rivals. The re-recorded versions feature updated, contemporary production, such as the "electro-bass" on "I Wish It Could Be Christmas Everyday" and the "Pet Shop Boys-esque synth groove" on "White Christmas".

== Track listing ==
All tracks produced by Xenomania.

No.	Title	Writer(s)	Length
1.	"Christmas 'Round at Ours"	Miranda Cooper (Note: Cooper is credited on the release itself as "Holly Bush".); Brian Higgins (Note: Higgins is credited on the release itself as "S. Claws".); Shawn Lee (Note: Lee is credited on the release itself as "Henry Mistletoe".); Lisa Cowling (Note: Cowling is credited on the release itself as "Beth Lehem".); Tim Larcombe (Note: Larcombe is credited on the release itself as "Yuell Logg".)	3:02
2.	"Merry Xmas Everybody"	Jim Lea; Noddy Holder	3:43
3.	"Not Tonight Santa"	Cooper; Higgins; S. Lee; Cowling; Tim Coler (Note: Coler is credited on the release itself as "Festiv Gifts".)	2:42
4.	"Jingle Bell Rock"	J.C. Beal; J.R. Boothe	1:57
5.	"Count the Days"	Cooper; Higgins; S. Lee; Cowling; Larcombe	3:55
6.	"I Wish It Could Be Christmas Everyday"	Roy Wood	4:01
7.	"I Wanna Kiss You So (Christmas in a Nutshell)"	Cooper; Higgins; S. Lee; Cowling; Coler	3:36
8.	"White Christmas"	Irving Berlin	2:57
9.	"Not Tonight Santa" (Christmas Party Mix)	Cooper; Higgins; S. Lee; Cowling; Coler	6:01

Digital and streaming editions exclusive track
No.	Title	Writer(s)	Length
10.	"Not Tonight Santa" (Christmas Party Mix Radio Edit)	Cooper; Higgins; S. Lee; Cowling; Coler	3:26
Total length:			35:20

== Charts ==
Chart performance for Christmas 'Round at Ours
Chart (2025)	Peak position
Scottish Albums (OCC)	63
UK Albums Sales (OCC)	54
