= Children in Need 2012 =

- Genre: Telethon
- Presented by: Sir Terry Wogan; Fearne Cotton; Tess Daly; Nick Grimshaw
- Narrated by: Alan Dedicoat
- Country of origin: United Kingdom
- Original language: English

Production
- Production location: BBC Television Centre
- Camera setup: Multiple

Original release
- Network: BBC One; BBC Two
- Release: 16 November 2012

Related
- Children in Need 2011; Children in Need 2013

Children in Need 2012 was a campaign held in the United Kingdom to raise money for the charity Children in Need. 2012 marks the 32nd anniversary of the appeal which culminated in a live broadcast on BBC One and BBC Two on the evening of Friday 16 November until the early hours of Saturday 17 November.

The broadcast was hosted by Terry Wogan, with Tess Daly, Fearne Cotton and Nick Grimshaw as co-hosts. The show was broadcast from BBC Television Centre in London but also includes regular regional opt-outs presented from various locations around the UK. The 2012 appeal also marked the last Children in Need broadcast from BBC Television Centre as the BBC then sold and moved out of the building.

== Telethon ==
- The Mystery of Pudsey Bear's Eye Sketch with Misery Bear and Geri Halliwell.

=== Running order ===
- One Direction - "Live While We're Young"
- Doctor Who - The Great Detective (Mini Episode)
- The Friendship Project with Nina Wadia
- Strictly Come Dancing - Ann Widdecombe and Russell Grant dance off
- Aled Jones and the Children in Need choir - "Bridge over Troubled Water"
- Doctor Who Christmas special preview trailer
- The One Show Rickshaw Challenge
- Pudsey Bear vs Pudsey the dog dance off
- Girls Aloud - "Something New"
- The Walford Apprentice with Alan Sugar and EastEnders
- Chris Moyles featuring Morecambe and Wise - "Bring Me Sunshine"
- Not Going Out - featuring Sir Terry Wogan
- Susan Boyle - Over the Rainbow
- Team GB - "Do Your Thing"/"Single Ladies (Put a Ring on It)"/"Gangnam Style" music video
- Girls Aloud - "Beautiful Cause You Love Me"
- One Direction - "Little Things"
- Kylie Minogue - "Can't Get You Out of My Head"/"Spinning Around"/"I Should Be So Lucky"/"The Loco-Motion"
- The Script - "Six Degrees of Separation"
- Little Mix - "Change Your Life"
- BBC Newsreaders; Bill Turnbull, Sophie Raworth and Fiona Bruce do Top Gear in the Star in a Reasonably Priced Car
- Melanie C and Emma Bunton - "I Know Him So Well"
- Repeat of Chris Moyles performing Bring Me Sunshine
- Leona Lewis - "Fireflies"
- Call the Midwife Christmas special preview
- Repeat of Team GB performing Do Your Thing
- The Sarah Millican Television Programme Children in Need special
- Shona McGarty - "A Change Is Gonna Come"
- Paloma Faith - "Just Be"
- Il Divo - "My Heart Will Go On" (in Italian)
- Tim Minchin - "White Wine in the Sun"
- Repeat of EastEnders Walford Apprentice
- Stooshe - "Waterfalls"
- Charlotte Church - "How Not to Be Surprised When You're a Ghost"
- Example - "Say Nothing"
- Repeat of Girls Aloud performing Something New

== Media ==
As part of the appeal, the reformed girl group Girls Aloud released the song "Something New", with all proceeds for the song going to the charity and the song becoming the Official single for the appeal. In addition, the film Nativity 2: Danger in the Manger was shown in 42 Cineworld cinemas across the UK as charity screenings with all proceeds for these showings going to Children in Need.

== Totals ==
The following are totals with the times they were announced on the televised show.

Date	Time	Total
16 November 2012	20:55 UTC	£10,807,462
16 November 2012	21:55 UTC	£14,703,462
16 November 2012	23:27 UTC	£19,932,636
17 November 2012	01:08 UTC	£23,924,845
17 November 2012	02:03 UTC	£26,757,446

== Locations ==
The main telethon event was held inside BBC Television Centre, London, with other programmes coming from other locations. The preceding The One Show special was broadcast from outside Television Centre. In addition, each of the BBC Nations and Regions held their own event until approximately halfway through the telethon, contributing acts including the nationwide children's choir. These events were held at:

- BBC Scotland - The Beach Ballroom, Aberdeen.
- BBC Cymru Wales - BBC Hoddinott Hall, Cardiff.
- BBC Northern Ireland - Broadcasting House, Belfast.
- BBC North East and Cumbria - The Alnwick Garden, Northumberland.
- BBC North West - Museum of Lancashire, Preston.
- BBC Yorkshire - Magna Science Adventure Centre, Rotherham.
- BBC Yorkshire and Lincolnshire - Baths Hall, Scunthorpe.
- BBC East - West Road Concert Hall, University of Cambridge, Cambridge.
- BBC East Midlands - Conkers Discovery Centre, National Forest, Leicestershire.
- BBC Midlands - BBC Birmingham, The Mailbox, Birmingham.
- BBC West - STEAM: Museum of the Great Western Railway, Swindon.
- BBC South West - The Forum, University of Exeter, Exeter.
- BBC South - INTECH, Winchester.
- BBC South East - Glyndebourne, Lewes.
- BBC London - Tower of London, London.

== BBC programmes ==
In addition to the main telethon, several other BBC programmes and services have been fundraising for the appeal:

- Directly before the main telethon, a special edition of The One Show was aired in which the six participants of the Rickshaw Challenge return to BBC Television Centre. The challenge involves six children who have been helped by Children in Need travelling the 411 miles to London from Llandudno. Preceding the programme and the news was Pointless, which was a special edition in which Harry Judd, Danielle Harold, Perry Fenwick, Arlene Phillips and Duncan James. The team raised £1,127,317.
- The makeover programme DIY SOS: The Big Build renovated a centre for children with special needs. Broadcast on 14 November, the renovation of The Yard in Edinburgh also looked at the work the centre, which receives Children in Need funding, does. Viewers could donate throughout the programme by texting a code to donate £5.
- A special edition of antiques programme Bargain Hunt, broadcast on 16 November, featured Olympians Helen Glover, Samantha Murray, Lutalo Muhammad and Paralympian Lee Pearson trying to buy and sell antiques at a profit. The programme also sold other merchandise and experiences at auction. Through the profits the team gained, the sales of the experiences and merchandise, donation of the 'leftover lolly' and a small donation by presenter Tim Wonnacott the total raised was £1260.
- Rural affairs programme Countryfile released the Countryfile Calendar for 2013 in aid of Children in Need, with the pictures used in the Calendar from the Photographic competition held earlier in the year. The calendar raised £557,280 for appeal night.
- Children's magazine programme Blue Peter ran their annual appeal 'Go Pyjamas' for Children in Need. In it, participants are encouraged to be sponsored in wearing pyjamas when doing everyday tasks.
- BBC Radio 2 held several events to raise money for Children in Need including auctions of experiences, their Jukebox where listeners can hear their favourite songs in exchange for a donation, a summer Car fest as well as events held in the West End, Stand up for Pudsey and Weekend Wogan live and other additional fundraising efforts. They raised £4,010,974 for the appeal night.
- To mark the move of the BBC to New Broadcasting House, London, BBC Radio 4's Today programme asked listeners to create a skin for a DAB Digital Radio. The winning design, by David Hampson, was created and sold in aid of Children in Need.

== Partners ==
- Supermarket Asda sold Children in Need branded clothing, cookery products and merchandise involving Pudsey and Blush in addition to local fundraising events. They managed to raise £1,200,000 towards the appeal.
- Bakery chain Greggs sold specially decorated cakes and biscuits in addition to merchandise and local fundraising events. They raised £1,000,000 from their efforts.
- Pharmaceuticals chain Boots sold Pudsey and Blush merchandise as well as organising fundraising events in their stores raising £600,000.
- French car manufacturer Peugeot launched an online game Pudsey's Dream Wheels that allows members of the public to design a dream car for Pudsey. In exchange for a donation to Children in Need, their design could be entered into a draw to win a Peugeot 208 car.
- The Post Office are stocking Pudsey and Blush merchandise, as well as being key supporters of the Bear Faced campaign and are also a key location for donating and paying in raised money.
- Costco organised several fundraising events at their stores for the charity.
- DIY retailer B&Q sold merchandise and special spotted items for Children in Need and also undertook several fundraising events in their stores.
- Motorway service chain Welcome Break sold Children in Need merchandise, took part in fundraising events throughout the year and also collected money through their 'Spare a penny when you Spend a penny' scheme, encouraging visitors to donate their change when visiting the toilets.
- Building society Nationwide sold Children in Need merchandise, undertook fundraising activities and provided a place for funds to be paid into the charity. In addition, they also produced a pack to help children understand money with they help of Pudsey.
- Department stores Debenhams sold fourteen children's T-shirts designed by the top fashion designers for the store.
- Build-A-Bear Workshop offered customers the chance to build their own Pudsey or Blush bear with money donated to Children in Need through the sale.
- Restaurant chain Frankie & Benny's completed fundraising events across their restaurant chains.
- Kitchenware company Lakeland sold several cake baking products involving Pudsey and the spots theme.
- HM Revenue and Customs collected some money through sponsors for fundraising activities and through taking some donations through their centres.
- Lego sold a special Pudsey kit in aid of Children in Need.
- Chocolate makers Lindt have produced a lineup of chocolate bears for sale in aid of Children in Need.
- Holiday park operator Haven undertook several fundraising events at their various parks around the country.

Other partners include BT, who run the telethon call centres, PayPal, for online payment methods and eBay, who operate the online shop.

== See also ==
- Children In Need
- Pudsey Bear
- Pudseys Dream Wheels - Online Game by Peugeot UK
