= Ten (Girls Aloud album) =

2012 compilation album by Girls Aloud

Greatest hits album by Girls Aloud
- Released: 26 November 2012
- Recorded: November 2002 – May 2012
- Genre: Pop
- Length: 61:01
- Label: Polydor
- Producer: Brian Higgins; Xenomania; The Invisible Men; DJ Fresh; Jim Eliot

Girls Aloud chronology
Out of Control (2008)	Ten (2012)	Christmas 'Round at Ours (2025)

Singles from Ten
- 1. "Something New" Released: 18 November 2012; 2. "Beautiful 'Cause You Love Me" Released: 17 December 2012

Ten is the second greatest hits album released by English-Irish girl group Girls Aloud, released in commemoration of the group's tenth anniversary. It was released in the United Kingdom on 26 November 2012 through Polydor Records. The album consists of fourteen of Girls Aloud's singles, including the number-one singles "Sound of the Underground", "I'll Stand by You" and "The Promise", and four new tracks.

The album was praised by contemporary music critics, who noted songwriting and production team Xenomania's creativity and Girls Aloud's strong collection of hit singles. The album was promoted with Girls Aloud's final singles, "Something New" and "Beautiful 'Cause You Love Me", as well as Ten: The Hits Tour (2013).

== Background ==
Ten was the first album released by the group since their fifth and final studio album, Out of Control (2008). After signing a three-album deal with Fascination Records in February 2009, the group announced in July of that year that they would be taking a year-long hiatus to pursue solo projects, and returning in 2010 with a new studio album, which did not eventuate. In August 2012, Cheryl Cole confirmed Girls Aloud's reunion would occur in November of that year. A few days later, on 31 August, Cole confirmed to BBC Radio 1 and Capital FM that the girls' new single would be released in November, teasing the lyrics "I just wanna dance". Prior to the album's announcement, a countdown appeared a week beforehand on the group's website, fuelling speculation started by Cole in August. The album was officially announced on 19 October 2012, with all five members appearing at a press conference announcing the accompanying lead single to the public.

== Material ==
Eight tracks from Girls Aloud's first greatest hits album, The Sound of Girls Aloud: The Greatest Hits (2006) are included on Ten, namely "Sound of the Underground", "No Good Advice", "Jump", "The Show", "Love Machine", "I'll Stand by You", "Biology" and "Something Kinda Ooooh". The singles after the group's first and before their second greatest hits album such as "Sexy! No No No...", "Call the Shots", "Can't Speak French", "The Promise", "The Loving Kind" and "Untouchable" made the track listing of Ten. The only singles after their first greatest hits album that were not included on the group's second greatest hits album are "Walk This Way" and "I Think We're Alone Now". The track listing of the deluxe edition's bonus disc was decided by the fans, voting for their choices on Girls Aloud's official website.

Four new songs appear on the album. Girls Aloud's longtime collaborator, songwriting and production team Xenomania, wrote "Something New" and "Every Now and Then". Girls Aloud member Nicola Roberts co-wrote the track "On the Metro" alongside Jason Pebworth, George Astasio, Jon Shave and Dan Stein, and Rachel Moulden wrote the track "Beautiful 'Cause You Love Me". The inclusion of these two tracks makes Ten the first album since their debut, Sound of the Underground, not to be produced exclusively by Xenomania.

== Release ==
Ten was released in the United Kingdom on 26 November 2012. The album is available in three editions. The standard edition features one disc containing eighteen tracks, including four new songs. The deluxe edition features a bonus disc with a track listing voted by the group's fans. The HMV release of the deluxe edition included exclusive badges. A limited edition box set was made available on Girls Aloud's official website. The set is packaged inside a collector's box and includes the deluxe edition of the album with a gatefold cover, the never-before-released The Passions of Girls Aloud on a two-disc set, six exclusive art prints, and a golden ticket to win one of ten prizes.

== Promotion ==
In addition to performances of "Something New" on Children in Need 2012 and Strictly Come Dancing, Girls Aloud performed their 2008 single "The Promise" at the 2012 Royal Variety Performance in London in November 2012. It was televised on 3 December 2012 to over eight million viewers. They performed a headlining set at Capital FM's Jingle Bell Ball, performing five songs – "Something Kinda Ooooh", "The Promise", "Beautiful 'Cause You Love Me", "Call the Shots", and Something New". On 14 December, Girls Aloud appeared on BBC Radio 1's Live Lounge, performing their 2004 single "Love Machine" and a mash-up of Labrinth and Emeli Sandé's "Beneath Your Beautiful" with their song "Beautiful 'Cause You Love Me". On the same date, Girls Aloud performed "Love Machine" on The Graham Norton Show on BBC One.

A documentary special entitled Girls Aloud: Ten Years at the Top aired on ITV on 15 December 2012. The documentary explored the band's history, their individual successes, and their tenth anniversary reunion, also featuring behind-the-scenes access to their comeback preparations, culminating in their performance at the Royal Variety. The documentary attracted 2.5 million viewers on ITV.

On 21 February 2013, the group embarked on Ten: The Hits Tour. The tour was the group's first tour in four years and their first tour since they returned from their three-year hiatus. It ended on 20 March 2013, with their final performance at Echo Arena Liverpool, which was followed by the official disbandment of Girls Aloud.

== Singles ==
The lead single from the album, "Something New" was released on 16 November 2012. The song premiered on Capital FM on 16 October 2012. The song received generally positive views from critics, praising its unusual structure as well as the production. The song was also the official single for Children in Need and it peaked at number two on the UK Singles Chart.

The second single, "Beautiful 'Cause You Love Me", premiered on BBC Radio 2 on 13 November 2012, while the digital release took place on 17 December 2012. It was also sent to mainstream radio in the United Kingdom. Lyrically, the song was compared to Sugababes' "Ugly", TLC's "Unpretty" and Demi Lovato's "Skyscraper", while musically it was compared to the Spice Girls' "Too Much".

== Critical reception ==
Professional ratings
Aggregate scores
Source	Rating
Metacritic	79/100
Review scores
Source	Rating
AllMusic	4/5 stars
Daily Express	4/5
Digital Spy	5/5 stars
Drowned in Sound	7/10
Pitchfork	7.0/10
So So Gay	4.5/5 stars
State	4/5 stars
The Times	4/5 stars

Ten received positive reviews from music critics. Ian Wade of BBC Music hailed it as "incredible proof of how perfect pop can be in the right hands", placed it "up there with Gold, Substance and Discography in terms of greatest-hits sets" and concluded by stating that "if it's the last long-player Girls Aloud put their name to, their legacy is assured." Robert Copsey of Digital Spy awarded the album five stars out of five, praised the inclusion of the songs "Black Jacks" and "Memory of You" in the bonus disc tracklist and called Ten "a carefully-balanced collection that should please both casual and dedicated fans." Simon Gage of the Daily Express wrote that Girls Aloud are "celebrating their decade with an album that includes greatest hits [...] and [...] a number of new tracks that are in the main pumped-up crowd-pleasing pop" and noted that "you’d have to be mad not to go with it." Lee Williscroft-Ferris of So So Gay noticed that "Girls Aloud's success lies in having stuck with a winning formula to carve out a distinctive, instantly recognisable sound for themselves, while never becoming tedious or predictable", called Ten "an essential addition to anyone's music collection" and described it as "a true testament to Girls Aloud's prowess as a manufactured girlband, who have stood the test of time through a combination of clever marketing, wise adherence to a successful musical direction and the chemistry which binds the five individuals together as an act."

David Edwards of Drowned in Sound praised the band's production team, Xenomania, for crafting "wondrous and weird, dirty and daunting, sexy and sublime songs" and noticed that Girls Aloud "for most of their career, [...] delivered blindingly good pop music." However, he criticised the choice of singles included in the album as well as the covers, while praising songs like "Call the Shots", which he described as "an impeccable piece of melodic layering and dynamic majesty" and "Biology", which he hailed as "their absolute masterpiece, [...] a beautiful Frankenstein's monster of modern pop." He eventually called Girls Aloud "the greatest British pop band of the past ten years." Douglas Wolk of Pitchfork compared them to The Supremes and described them as "a group whose presence is all about charm and restraint, and whose behind-the-scenes powerhouse is a brilliantly original writing and production team." He highly commended the complexity of the songs "Biology" and "Love Machine", but felt that the covers and the new tracks, particularly "Beautiful Cause You Love Me", "just drag the album down." He went on to suggest that "they may have a second wave in them" and concluded by writing that "the virtue of Girls Aloud's best songs [...] is that the next part is always even better than the one you're listening to until, suddenly, they're over." Commenting on the new tracks, Phil Udell of State felt that "they have managed to maintain the quality" and noted that the singles "Love Machine", "The Show" and "Biology" "still prove the highlight of their career so far, fizzing with an excitement and joy that's hard to beat." Si Hawkins of The National wrote that Girls Aloud were "a breath of fresh air [...] back in 2002 [...] and have remained a guilty pleasure ever since", highlighted "On the Metro" as the standout new track and called Ten "a fine body of work." In his review of the album, Andy Kellman of AllMusic noticed that "despite the amount of new material, some of which is not up to par with the earlier smashes and certain album cuts, this is a handy sampling of Girls Aloud's biggest moments." Jon O'Brien of omg! praised the band's ability "to cram more hooks into each song than most of their rivals could manage in their entire career" and although he criticised all of the new tracks except "Something New", he eventually called Ten a "triumphant retrospective".

== Commercial performance ==
Ten entered the UK Albums Chart at number nine on 2 December 2012. The following week, the album dropped seventeen spots to number twenty-six. It spent a total of fifteen weeks on the official UK Albums Chart. As of 21 March 2013, Ten has sold 156,000 copies in the United Kingdom, according to the Official Charts Company (OCC). Following the untimely death of Sarah Harding, the album saw a resurgence in popularity in September 2021 with chart sales increasing by 320% and the album entered the top 100 at 61 on 16 September 2021 (week ending).

== Track listing ==
- All tracks produced by Brian Higgins and Xenomania, except where indicated.

Ten – Standard edition
No.	Title	Writer(s)	Producer(s)	Length
1.	"Something New" (new recording, 2012)	Brian Higgins; Wayne Hector; Tim Deal; Matt Gray; Carla Marie Williams; Tove Nilsson; Nicola Roberts; Florence Arnold	Higgins	3:20
2.	"The Promise" (radio edit) (from Out of Control, 2008)	Miranda Cooper; Higgins; Jason Resch; Kieran Jones; Williams; Nick Coler; Tim Powell		3:43
3.	"The Loving Kind" (radio mix) (from Out of Control)	Cooper; Higgins; Powell; Neil Tennant; Chris Lowe		3:59
4.	"Untouchable" (radio mix) (from Out of Control)	Cooper; Higgins; Powell; Gray		3:48
5.	"Sexy! No No No..." (from Tangled Up, 2007)	Pete Agnew; Myra Antonia Boyle; Manny Charlton; Cheryl Cole; Coler; Cooper; Lisa Cowling; Nadine Coyle; Gray; Sarah Harding; Higgins; Dan McCafferty; Powell; Roberts; Darrell Sweet; Kimberley Walsh; Williams		3:18
6.	"Call the Shots" (from Tangled Up)	Higgins; Cooper; Powell; Giselle Sommerville; Cowling		3:43
7.	"Can't Speak French" (Jeremy Wheatley radio edit) (from Tangled Up)	Cooper; Higgins; Powell; Coler; Jody Lei; Williams		3:19
8.	"Something Kinda Ooooh" (from The Sound of Girls Aloud: The Greatest Hits, 2006)	Cooper; Higgins; Powell; Coler; Lei; Sommerville		3:20
9.	"Biology" (from Chemistry, 2005)	Cooper; Higgins; Cowling; Powell; Sommerville		3:35
10.	"The Show" (from What Will the Neighbours Say?, 2004)	Cooper; Higgins; Cowling; Jon Shave; Powell		3:36
11.	"Love Machine" (from What Will the Neighbours Say?)	Cooper; Higgins; Powell; Coler; Cowling; Myra Boyle; Shawn Lee		3:25
12.	"I'll Stand by You" (from What Will the Neighbours Say?)	Tom Kelly; Chrissie Hynde; William Steinberg		3:43
13.	"Jump" (from Sound of the Underground, 2003 (reissue) and What Will the Neighbours Say?)	Marti Sharron; Gary Paul Skardina; Steve Mitchell		3:39
14.	"No Good Advice" (from Sound of the Underground)	Cooper; Higgins; Cowling; Coler; Lene Nystrøm		3:47
15.	"Sound of the Underground" (from Sound of the Underground)	Cooper; Niara Scarlett; Higgins		3:41
16.	"On the Metro" (new recording, 2012)	Nicola Roberts; Jason Pebworth; George Astasio; Shave; Dan Stein	The Invisible Men; DJ Fresh	3:12
17.	"Beautiful 'Cause You Love Me" (new recording, 2012)	Rachel Moulden	Jim Eliot	3:28
18.	"Every Now and Then" (new recording, 2012)	Higgins; Hector; Cooper; Annie Yuill; André Tegeler; Jaxon Bellina; Deal; Gray	Higgins	4:25
Total length:				61:01

Ten – Deluxe edition (disc 2)
No.	Title	Writer(s)	Length
1.	"Graffiti My Soul" (from What Will the Neighbours Say?)	Cooper; Higgins; Powell; Cowling; Peplab	3:14
2.	"Wake Me Up" (performance edit) (from What Will the Neighbours Say?)	Cooper; Higgins; Powell; Cowling; Lee; Paul Woods; Yusra Maru'e	3:10
3.	"Wild Horses" (from Chemistry)	Cooper; Higgins; Coler; Cowling; Boyle; Lee	3:23
4.	"Swinging London Town" (from Chemistry)	Cooper; Higgins; Powell; Gray	4:02
5.	"Whole Lotta History" (original Ash Howes mix) (from Chemistry)	Cooper; Higgins; Cowling; Sommervile; Larcombe	3:47
6.	"Crazy Fool" (B-side to "Whole Lotta History")	Cole; Cooper; Coyle; Harding; Higgins; Nicola Roberts; Shave; Walsh	3:34
7.	"Girl Overboard" (from Tangled Up)	Cooper; Higgins; Powell; Coler; Lei	4:09
8.	"Black Jacks" (from Tangled Up)	Cooper; Higgins; Powell; Coler; Cowling	4:20
9.	"Hoxton Heroes" (B-side to "Can't Speak French")	Cole; Cooper; Coyle; Harding; Higgins; Powell; Owen Parker; Roberts; Walsh	3:00
10.	"Memory of You" (B-side to "The Loving Kind")	Cole; Cooper; Coyle; Harding; Higgins; Powell; Roberts; Sommerville; Walsh	3:48
Total length:			35:07

Ten – Deluxe edition (disc 3)
No.	Title	Length
1.	"The Passions of Girls Aloud: Sarah"	46:01
2.	"The Passions of Girls Aloud: Cheryl"	47:30
Total length:		93:31

Ten – Deluxe edition (disc 4)
No.	Title	Length
1.	"The Passions of Girls Aloud: Kimberley"	48:13
2.	"The Passions of Girls Aloud: Nicola"	45:46
Total length:		93:59

== Charts ==
=== Weekly charts ===
Weekly chart performance for Ten
Chart (2012)	Peak position
Irish Albums (IRMA)	17
Scottish Albums (OCC)	12
UK Albums (OCC)	9

2021 weekly chart performance for Ten
Chart (2021)	Peak position
UK Albums (OCC)	61

2024 weekly chart performance for Ten
Chart (2024)	Peak position
Irish Albums (OCC)	10

=== Year-end charts ===
Year-end chart performance for Ten
Chart (2012)	Position
UK Albums (OCC)	78

== Certifications ==
Certifications for Ten
Region	Certification	Certified units/sales
United Kingdom (BPI)	Platinum	300,000^{‡}
^{‡} Sales+streaming figures based on certification alone.

== See also ==
- List of UK top-ten albums in 2012
