= The Promise (Girls Aloud song) =

2008 single by Girls Aloud

Single by Girls Aloud

from the album Out of Control
- B-side: "She"; "Girl Overboard" (live)
- Released: 15 October 2008
- Length: 3:43
- Label: Fascination
- Songwriters: Miranda Cooper; Brian Higgins; Jason Resch; Kieran Jones; Carla Marie Williams
- Producers: Brian Higgins; Xenomania

Girls Aloud singles chronology
"Can't Speak French" (2008)	"The Promise" (2008)	"The Loving Kind" (2009)

Music video
- "The Promise" on YouTube

"The Promise" is a single by British-Irish girl group Girls Aloud, taken from their fifth and final studio album Out of Control (2008). The song was written by Brian Higgins, Miranda Cooper, Jason Resch, Kieran Jones, and Carla Marie Williams and produced by frequent contributor Higgins along with production team Xenomania. Influenced by Phil Spector and music of the 1960s, "The Promise" is an upbeat love song about falling in love uncontrollably after promising to never fall in love again.

The song was praised and appreciated by most contemporary music critics, who lauded the song despite considering it unusual for Girls Aloud. It was honoured as Song of the Year at the 2009 BRIT Awards, becoming Girls Aloud's first win at the ceremony, and was also nominated for PRS for Music's Most Performed Work at the 2010 Ivor Novello Awards as well as for Best Single at the 2008 Heat Awards. "The Promise" was also awarded the Popjustice £20 Music Prize, the band's fifth single to win the prize.

Upon its release in October 2008, the single became Girls Aloud's fourth number one on the UK Singles Chart, continuing their six-year streak of top ten hits. It also peaked at number two on the Irish Singles Chart. A music video for the song, directed by Trudy Bellinger, is set at a drive-in movie theatre, where the group attend a 1960s-style screening of themselves performing the song. "The Promise" was promoted through numerous live appearances, including a high-profile performance on the fifth series of The X Factor, and served as the opening number of 2009's Out of Control Tour.

== Background ==
The backing track for the song was composed by two Australian musicians, Jason Resch and Kieran Jones, who would later play the song for Brian Higgins. Higgins and Miranda Cooper, afraid they would "ruin the moment", waited weeks to write the song's lyrics; they eventually wrote the song in seven minutes. Higgins said, "We knew that was the piece of music Girls Aloud needed to announce them as a supergroup in this country, so we knew we couldn't drop the ball melodically or lyrically." He elaborated, "Girls Aloud's records were more driving and pumping and innovative then than they are now because that's not what's required [...] "The Promise" was the sound of a big group, a group about to be huge. They needed the theme tune to the biggest girl group on the planet".

As soon as Girls Aloud heard the song, they decided it should be the first single from Out of Control. The group defied their record label's demands for another song, The Loving Kind, to be released as the lead single with the label claiming that the song would be "pop suicide". Nadine Coyle, who had just flown out from Los Angeles to do the Out of Control album photo shoot, threatened to not participate in the photo shoot at all and to immediately fly back to Los Angeles until the label conceded to the group's demands. The day before the song was due to be delivered to Fascination Records, the entire backing track was re-recorded to allow for a last-minute key change in the final choruses.

== Composition ==
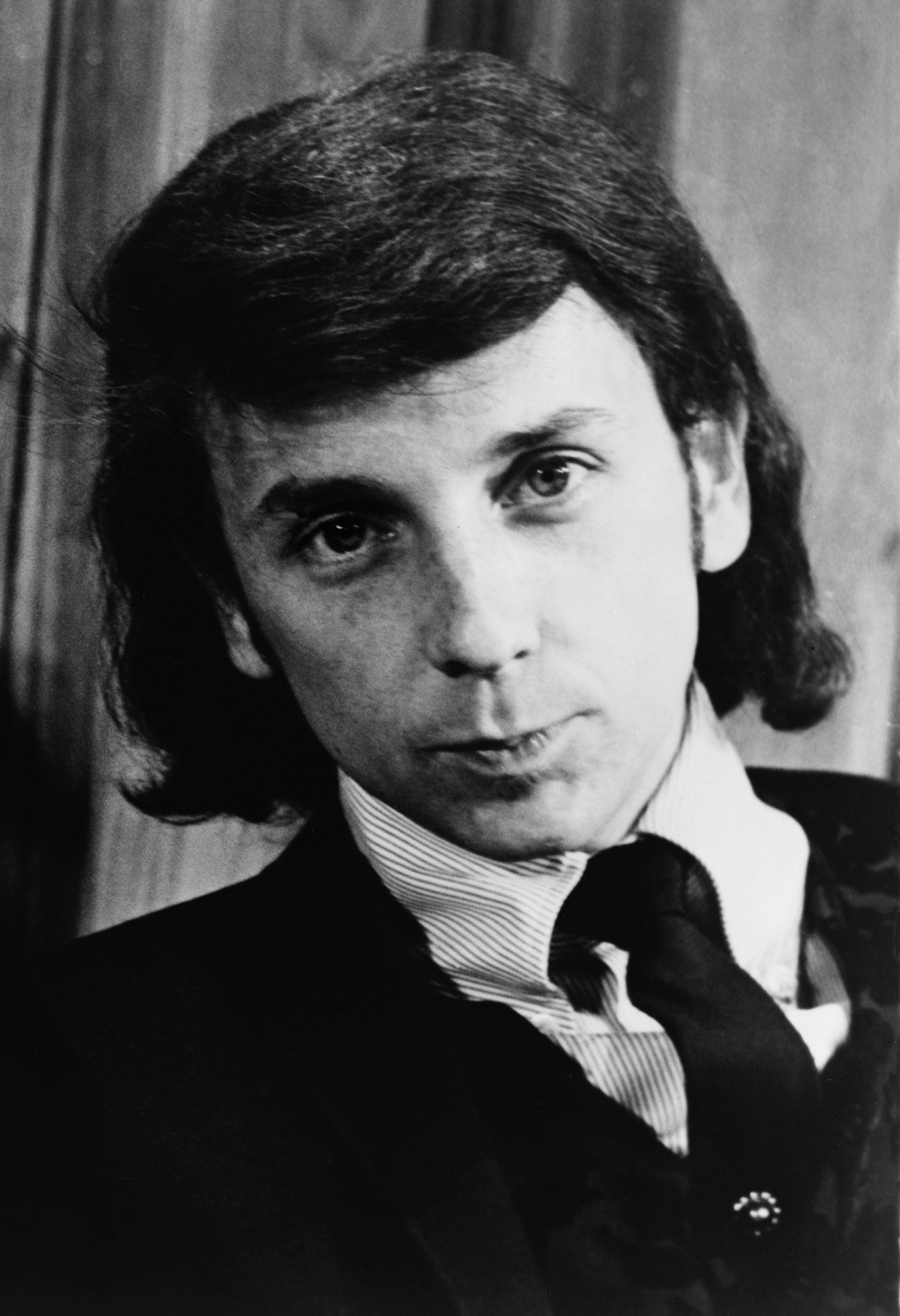
"The Promise" was compared to Phil Spector's Wall of Sound technique.

"The Promise" is an homage to 1960s music, particularly American record producer Phil Spector's famous Wall of Sound technique. It has been described as "a 1960s-influenced pop gem given a contemporary Girls Aloud twist". Peter Robinson, however, noted that the song "also hinted at a mellower side of 1970s New York disco, as if it were some sort of long soundtrack from a deleted scene in Saturday Night Fever." The song is written in A major with a time signature in common time and a tempo of 88 beats per minute. The vocal range spans from G♯_{3} to C_{5}. The chord progression varies throughout the song, but chords include E, Am, C, A, Dm, and D. "The Promise" is composed in rondo form, the chorus serving as the song's only repeated section. A key change takes place before the song's final chorus, in which it is in B-flat major. Both the radio edit and the album version of the song were edited from the full-length version for release. The radio edit lasts 3:42 and has a cold ending. The album version of "The Promise" is around fifteen seconds longer, opting for a repeat and fade of Sarah Harding's first verse following the final chorus.

== Release ==
Described by the band's website as a "stormer of a track", "The Promise" premièred on Switch on BBC Radio 1 on 14 September 2008. During promotion, Girls Aloud announced dates for 2009's Out of Control Tour. The song was released as a physical CD single in Ireland on 15 October 2008, followed by a digital release in Ireland and the United Kingdom on 19 October. The physical CD was released in the UK a day afterwards. It was originally scheduled for release on 27 October 2008, but the release was brought forward a week. The CD single featured a brand new b-side entitled "She", while an exclusive remix of "The Promise" by Jason Nevins was available as an iTunes exclusive. "The Promise" was also remixed by Dave Audé. A limited edition picture disc was made available exclusively through Girls Aloud's official website, featuring a live performance of "Girl Overboard" as the b-side. The song was digitally released in Germany on 16 January 2009 and physically on 27 March.

== Critical response ==
"The Promise" received mostly positive reviews from music critics. Although it was said to be "not what you'd necessarily expect from the gorgeous girl group," the song was praised for "its fantastic melody" and being "more interesting than the average retro-pop nugget." Digital Spy referred to the single as "a cute, wistful pop song" with "some nice Spectorish touches in the production and a lovely, classic-sounding melody" that "grows more persuasive with every listen." Rebecca Nicholson of The Guardian felt the song was "disappointing" because "Girls Aloud's producers have always been capable of making exciting and innovative pop music". However, Caroline Sullivan of the same publication thought the song was an album highlight: "Nothing hits the spot like the Phil Spector-like single "The Promise", one of this year's better chart-toppers." John Murphy of MusicOMH argued that although "it may lack the innovation and attitude of some of their previous work, but if you're looking for sparkling, fresh and sheer bloody fun pop music, then there's nobody better right now than Girls Aloud." He praised the song for its "heavenly harmonies and a chorus that glides in and scoops you up in its arms."

"The Promise" received criticism for "too many cooks spoiling the broth." Jaime Gill from Yahoo! Music found that the production" on the song was "so overegged and the vocals so treacly [...] you'll get a sugar rush, but you won't feel good about yourself afterwards." MSN further criticised "The Promise" for being "a shameless attempt at trying to cash in on the Duffy and Winehouse favoured 60's femme pop." On the other hand, Robin Carolan from Slant Magazine said that while it "suggests the girls have [...] shallowly jumped aboard the retro-soul bandwagon led by Duffy and Amy Winehouse, [...] the song's go-for-broke, very modern re-imagining of Spector's Wall of Sound proves to be more authentic and entertaining than most other recent attempts". It has also received comparisons to Girls Aloud's previous single, "Can't Speak French", with Terry Wogan claiming that the tune features the melody from the theme song of his 1980s British TV quiz show Blankety Blank.

== Chart performance ==
"The Promise" entered the UK Singles Chart at number one, knocking off singer Pink's 2008 single "So What" from the top. Early midweek figures suggested that the song was outselling "So What" by nearly two to one. The group's fourth number one hit in the United Kingdom, it sold 77,110 copies in its first week, making it the band's second-best opening week, beaten only by "Sound of the Underground" (2002). The single became the fastest-selling single of 2008 until "Hero," a charity single by the finalists on The X Factor, sold in excess of 100,000 copies two days after release, and 313,244 copies overall. Cheryl Cole, who was also on The X Factor, joked: "I don't mind being knocked off number one – for this cause only!"

Additionally, the song entered the Irish Singles Chart at number four, their first time in the top four since 2004's "I'll Stand by You". In its second week on the Irish Chart, "The Promise" had risen two places to number two only being kept off by The X Factor finalists who were at number one. On 28 December 2008, the UK Singles Chart listed "The Promise" as the number 17 best-selling single in their year-end countdown. It was certified gold by the British Phonographic Industry (BPI) in January 2009. PRS for Music named "The Promise" as the sixth-most played song of 2009 in the UK, using data taken from the count of plays and performances online, live, and on TV and radio. Following Sarah Harding's death in September 2021, the song had a resurgence in popularity with streams spiking at 340%.

== Music video ==
Girls Aloud in the music video for "The Promise" (2008)

Filming for a music video for "The Promise" took place on 15 September 2008. The video premièred on AOL's website on 25 September 2008. The music video was directed by Trudy Bellinger for Merge@Crossroads Films, and produced by Golden Square. They had just over three days to produce an open-air drive-in movie theatre using Flame and studio footage of five cars. Girls Aloud also reportedly auditioned the male actors/musicians in the music video, one of whom was guitarist Rene Woollard.

In the music video, the group members are at a drive-in movie theatre which is playing a black-and-white film of their performance of the song. The video – in both the drive-in cinema and the film being shown – pays homage to the '50s and '60s and soul acts of the time such as the Supremes. The film features flickering and flashes to emulate films of the time, in parallel to the cinema and attending group members. Harding gets out of her car and walks in front of the screen to sing her "Here I am... walking primrose..." verse.

On 13 November 2026, to coincide with the release of the deluxe edition reissue of Out of Control, an alternative edit of the video was released, consisting solely of the black-and-white performance scenes.

== Live performances ==
Girls Aloud first performed "The Promise" on BBC Radio 1's Live Lounge on 25 September, as well as a cover of Timbaland and OneRepublic's "Apologize." Nadine Coyle was not present, for she was ill with shingles. The first televised performance occurred on 18 October 2008, on The X Factor, on which Cheryl Cole served as a member of the judging panel at the time. The group wore their hair in big bouffant style with sparkling gold dresses, similar to those in the music video. Positioned in front of a lit-up frame, they sang live and performed simple, synchronized choreography. As the song's key change occurred, pyrotechnics exploded from the ceiling and a shower of sparks fell behind Girls Aloud. At the song's end, a second explosion of pyrotechnics occurred at the front of the stage. The group also performed the song on Friday Night with Jonathan Ross, GMTV, T4, and This Morning throughout promotion. Girls Aloud further performed "The Promise" at the annual Children in Need telethon, and Top of the Pops' Christmas special.

For their variety show The Girls Aloud Party, which aired between The X Factor's finale and its results show on 13 December, Girls Aloud wore tight silver fishtail dresses. At the 2009 BRIT Awards, Girls Aloud performed in sleeveless sequined leotards. Accompanied by male dancers in white suits, the group performed a routine involving pink feather fans, giving the illusion of nudity until they emerged from behind the fans. The performance was nominated for Most Memorable Performance the following year at the 2010 BRIT Awards.

"The Promise" served as the opening song for Girls Aloud's 2009 Out of Control Tour. Girls Aloud "first appeared rising up through the floor on podiums in a haze of silver sparkle" for the opening, in which they are "wearing long, spangly dresses which they whipped off to reveal short mini skirts." The dresses, described as "angelic, shimmering, full-length gowns", were designed by Welsh fashion designer Julien MacDonald, along with the rest of the costumes. A dance-beat reprise of the song ended the show. Girls Aloud performed "The Promise" at the 2012 Royal Variety Performance in London in November 2012 to celebrate their tenth anniversary and promote their greatest hits album Ten. It was televised on 3 December 2012 to over 8 million viewers. It was also performed at Capital FM's Jingle Bell Ball as part of a headlining set.

During The Girls Aloud Show arena tour in 2024, "The Promise" was performed as the encore.

== Track listing ==
UK CD (Fascination / 1788035)
No.	Title	Writer(s)	Producer(s)	Length
1.	"The Promise" (radio edit)	Miranda Cooper; Brian Higgins; Jason Resch; Kieran Jones; Carla Marie Williams	Higgins; Xenomania	3:43
2.	"She"	Cooper; Higgins; Lisa Cowling; Tim "Rolf" Larcombe; Shawn Lee; Paul Woods	Higgins; Xenomania	3:24

UK 7" picture disc (Fascination)
No.	Title	Writer(s)	Producer(s)	Length
1.	"The Promise" (radio edit)	Cooper; Higgins; Resch; Jones; Williams	Higgins; Xenomania	3:43
2.	"Girl Overboard" (live at The O2)	Cooper; Higgins; Tim Powell; Nick Coler; Jody Lei	Higgins; Xenomania	4:31

iTunes exclusive digital download
No.	Title	Writer(s)	Producer(s)	Length
1.	"The Promise" (radio edit)	Cooper; Higgins; Resch; Jones; Williams	Higgins; Xenomania	3:43
2.	"The Promise" (Jason Nevins remix)	Cooper; Higgins; Powell; Coler; Lei	Higgins; Xenomania; Jason Nevins^{[a]}	6:51

The Singles Boxset (CD19) & Digital EP
No.	Title	Writer(s)	Producer(s)	Length
1.	"The Promise" (radio edit)	Cooper; Higgins; Resch; Jones; Williams	Higgins; Xenomania	3:43
2.	"She"	Cooper; Higgins; Cowling; Larcombe; Lee; Woods	Higgins; Xenomania	3:24
3.	"Girl Overboard" (Tangled Up Tour Live From O2)	Cooper; Higgins; Powell; Coler; Lei	Higgins; Xenomania	4:31
4.	"The Promise" (Jason Nevins club mix)	Cooper; Higgins; Resch; Jones; Williams	Higgins; Xenomania; Nevins^{[a]}	6:51
5.	"The Promise" (Jason Nevins edit)	Cooper; Higgins; Resch; Jones; Williams	Higgins; Xenomania; Nevins^{[a]}	3:57
6.	"The Promise" (Jason Nevins dub mix)	Cooper; Higgins; Resch; Jones; Williams	Higgins; Xenomania; Nevins^{[a]}	6:07
7.	"The Promise" (Dave Audé vocal edit)	Cooper; Higgins; Resch; Jones; Williams	Higgins; Xenomania; Dave Audé^{[a]}	3:50
8.	"The Promise" (Dave Audé extended vocal)	Cooper; Higgins; Resch; Jones; Williams	Higgins; Xenomania; Audé^{[a]}	7:08
9.	"The Promise" (Dave Audé 128 dub)	Cooper; Higgins; Resch; Jones; Williams	Higgins; Xenomania; Audé^{[a]}	7:12
10.	"The Promise" (Flip & Fill mix)	Cooper; Higgins; Resch; Jones; Williams	Higgins; Xenomania; Flip & Fill^{[a]}	6:10

Notes

- ^{^a} denotes additional producer

== Credits and personnel ==
- Drums: Florrie Arnold
- Engineering: Toby Scott, Dan Aslet
- Guitars: Nick Coler, Jason Resch, Kieran Jones, Owen Parker
- Mixing: Jeremy Wheatley
- Programming and keyboards: Tim Powell, Brian Higgins, Matt Gray, Toby Scott, Nick Coler, Miranda Cooper, Jason Resch, Owen Parker
- Songwriting: Miranda Cooper, Brian Higgins, Jason Resch, Kieran Jones, Carla Marie Williams
- Strings and woodwind: Mark C. Brown, Mike Kearsey, Jo Auckland, Nick Squires, Stefan Defiletm, Susan Early, Adrian Smith

== Charts ==
=== Weekly charts ===
Weekly chart performance for "The Promise"
Chart (2008)	Peak position
Europe (European Hot 100 Singles)	8
Ireland (IRMA)	2
Scottish Singles Sales (Official Charts)	3
UK Singles (Official Charts)	1
UK Airplay (Music Week)	1

=== Year-end charts ===
2008 year-end chart performance for "The Promise"
Chart (2008)	Position
UK Singles (OCC)	17

2009 year-end chart performance for "The Promise"
Chart (2009)	Position
UK Singles (OCC)	131

=== Decade-end chart ===
Decade-end chart performance for "The Promise"
Chart (2000–2009)	Position
UK Singles (OCC)	99

== Certifications ==
Certifications for "The Promise"
Region	Certification	Certified units/sales
United Kingdom (BPI)	Platinum	860,000

== Release history ==
Release dates and formats for "The Promise"
Region	Date	Label	Format	Ref
Ireland	15 October 2008	Polydor Records	CD single	
Ireland	19 October 2008	Polydor Records	Digital download	
United Kingdom	19 October 2008	Fascination Records	Digital download	
United Kingdom	20 October 2008	Fascination Records	CD single	
Germany	16 January 2009	Polydor Records	Digital download	
Germany	27 March 2009	Polydor Records	CD single	

== See also ==
- List of Platinum singles in the United Kingdom awarded since 2000
- List of UK Singles Chart number ones of the 2000s
