= Something New (Girls Aloud song) =

2012 single by Girls Aloud

Single by Girls Aloud

from the album Ten
- Released: 16 November 2012
- Recorded: May 2012
- Genre: Dance
- Length: 3:19
- Label: Polydor
- Songwriters: Brian Higgins; Wayne Hector; Tim Deal; Matt Gray; Carla Marie Williams; Tove Nilsson; Nicola Roberts; Florrie Arnold
- Producer: Brian Higgins

Girls Aloud singles chronology
"Untouchable" (2009)	"Something New" (2012)	"Beautiful 'Cause You Love Me" (2012)

Music video
- "Something New" on YouTube

"Something New" is a song recorded by British girl group Girls Aloud from their second compilation album, Ten (2012). It was released by Polydor Records on 16 November 2012, as the first single from the album and the official single for Children in Need 2012. In February 2009, the group signed a new record deal with Fascination Records that would see the group release another three studio albums; however, they announced that they were taking a hiatus to pursue solo projects. In April 2012, bandmate Cheryl revealed the girls had been in talks to regroup for the group's tenth anniversary later that year. In October 2012, a countdown was activated on Girls Aloud's official website, which would last until 19 October 2012, when "Something New" would be premiered on radio. However the date was brought forward to 16 October 2012 following an early online leak of the track. The release marked the group's first song to be instead of Fascination Records.

"Something New" is a dance song written by Xenomania along with group member Nicola Roberts and Wayne Hector, and produced by Girls Aloud's long-time collaborator Brian Higgins. Music critics were mostly positive towards the production, and compared it to songs by David Guetta, Nicki Minaj and Lady Gaga. They also noted that the track's structure follow the group's signature style. "Something New" debuted and peaked at number two on the UK Singles Chart, becoming Girls Aloud's 16th top five hit in the country. The song also peaked inside the top five in Ireland and Scotland. The accompanying music video was directed by Ray Kay, and features a mixture of black-and-white and coloured shots of the entire group, while also showcasing each member in a separate set-up. Girls Aloud performed "Something New" in few programmes, such as Strictly Come Dancing and Top of the Pops, and in 2013's Ten: The Hits Tour.

This is the second Children in Need song that the band have released, the first being "I'll Stand by You" in 2004.

== Background ==
In February 2009, Girls Aloud signed a new record deal with Fascination Records that would see the group release another three studio albums. However, in July 2009, the group announced that they were taking a year-long hiatus to pursue solo projects but would reunite for a new studio album in 2010; this did not happen, however. Two months later, the hiatus was briefly interrupted when they did two shows supporting Coldplay along with Jay-Z at Wembley Stadium. In April 2012, during an interview with Chris Moyles on Radio 1, Cheryl Cole revealed the girls had been in talks to regroup for the group's tenth anniversary later that year. In August 2012, Nicola Roberts was also featured on the same radio show, and said, "It's our tenth birthday in November so we will definitely celebrating. I wanna tell you everything but I really can't!"

The comeback was confirmed when Girls Aloud's official website posted on 9 October a countdown that would last until 19 October, when the girls would make a special announcement. It was speculated that they would make an appearance on BBC's Strictly Come Dancing, where bandmate Kimberley Walsh joined as a contestant. However, on 15 October, the surprise, a single titled "Something New", leaked online in full. The official radio premiere of the song was then brought forward to the following day, with Girls Aloud posting on their website, "It's here! The finished version of Something New will be played on radio from midday and will also be on YouTube to listen in full." "Something New" was released on 16 November 2012 by Polydor Records through digital download, serving as the official Children in Need 2012 single. When asked about how she felt with the group being back together and the reception from the public, Walsh said, "I'm kind of flattered people actually care if we come back or not. I think we are all quite proud that we made enough of an impact to be able to a comeback."

== Composition ==
Girls Aloud – Something New
A 20 second sample of "Something New"'s chorus verse, which opens with distorted vocals before the group starts singing over a dance background.

"Something New" was recorded in May 2012 and produced by Girls Aloud's long-time collaborator Brian Higgins. The uptempo dance song and was written in A major with a time signature in common time and a tempo of 115 beats per minute. "Something New" opens with Cole and Nadine Coyle chanting "Go, girls, g-g-go, go, go / We girls gonna take control / You boys better know, know, know / We girls gonna run this show" over a piano melody. As the chorus begins, the five girls join together and sing, "All I want is something new / Something I can hold on to / I don’t wanna talk / I just wanna dance / Baby let it drop / Catch me if you can." It ends with the group shouting, "Boy you better watch your back / Cause we're the leaders of the pack." A reviewer for Heat notice similarities to David Guetta productions and compared it to songs by Nicki Minaj and Lady Gaga. Michael Cragg of The Guardian compared the verse's structure to the one of "Sexy! No No No..." (2007), and thought that "Something New" echoed the group's previous single, "Something Kinda Ooooh" (2006), not only because of the title, "but it also has the same slightly demented feel to it, all distorted backing vocals, strange rap sections and a brilliantly effortless chorus that soars out of an amazing bridge bit." Most critics also had a similar perception to Cragg regarding the song's "odd" structure, which is noted as "typical" and the group's "signature style".

Keisha Buchanan from rival girl group, Sugababes, revealed on her YouTube channel that she had helped write Something New, including the main melody of the song. However, Sugababes decided the song “wasn’t the direction (they) were going for” and that Something New eventually was picked up by Girls Aloud. Buchanan does not appear on the credits for Something New.

== Reception ==
=== Critical response ===
According to a Metro publication, "Something New" had a generally positive reaction from fans. Susana Novo Vásquez of The Huffington Post stated that "the indisputable team of Xenomania/Girls Aloud have been the ones to set the trends over the years for others to follow," adding that the song "continues down that path." Vásquez continued saying that the group returned into a moment where the "pop scene ... isn't the same as when they left," but thought that they were "doing it in a very intelligent way: by adopting some of the Calvin Harris electronic massive sound that is current right now, yet creating an intricate song structure." Robert Copsey of Digital Spy said that "like most Girls Aloud singles, a few listens are required to get our heads around it." Copsey criticized the distorted vocals and the fact that "there probably won't be a full album of new tracks to accompany it," but admitted that "it sounds modern enough for today's charts without compromising their signature sound" and praised its "massive chorus." Douglas Wolk of Pitchfork Media thought that the track "is a game approximation of the Girls Aloud of seven years ago," while BBC Music reviewer Ian Wade concluded that, "as its title suggests, Something New is just that, a fanfare-like call to arms announcing the group’s return."

Phill Udel of State said that, with the song, Girls Aloud "have managed to maintain the quality" they had prior to the release of Ten, and commented that "the other three new songs are nowhere near up to the same standard." Idolator blogger Sam Lansky commented that, for the fans, "Something New" is "a welcome relief to have an injection of fresh energy into the stagnant girl group scene," and concluded that, "given that this may be the group's final single before disbanding for good, they're certainly going out on a high note, with a track that feels quintessentially Aloud but retooled for 2012." Rebecca Twomey of Marie Claire said that the group is "on key with the current trend for dance music with their new song," while noting that they have "clearly taken inspiration from Cheryl's Call My Name." Katy Brand of The Daily Telegraph was critical towards the song. Brand said that the lyrics "are the usual post-Spice fare," but commented that "the images weren't quite matching the words. I was hearing the battle cry of enraged queens who will be oppressed no longer; I was watching five young women wearing identical orange mini-dresses, strutting up and down in perfect synchronicity, like catwalk models."

In 2013 it was nominated for the Popjustice £20 Music Prize.

=== Chart performance ===
"Something New" debuted and peaked at number two on the UK Singles Chart with sales of 70,000 units, becoming Girls Aloud's 16th top five hit in the country, but being held off the top spot by Olly Murs's "Troublemaker" (2012), which sold a total of 121,000 units. The following week, the song fell out of the top ten, reaching number 14. It also debuted at number four in Ireland, falling to number 17 the following week. In Scotland, the song became the group's third consecutive single to peak at number two, falling to 13 the following week.

== Music video ==
Amidst rumors that Girls Aloud were preparing the release of a new single, Daily Mirror reported that the group reunited for the video shoot on 2 October 2012. On 15 October 2012, they uploaded a teaser video on YouTube, in which we see the five girls wearing matching bright orange tulip-skirt dresses as they march away from the camera on a monochrome set. On 19 October 2012, the video was officially released through VEVO. Directed by Ray Kay, the video features a mixture of black-and-white and colored shots, and also showcases each member in a separate set-up – based around a triangle-enthused backdrop, while being accentuated by a projection of light. These shots are primarily beauty shots, with the group singing, while dancing alone. The bridge features Harding sitting in front of a white background, wearing a nude bodysuit while abstract images are projected onto her. The video intercalates with stylized lyrics of the song, and builds throughout, until the last section, where the group abandon their various stages of walking and begin to dance together. Carl Williott of Idolator said the video "matches [the song's] swagger with the UK quintet mugging for the camera, strutting around in those orange dresses and declaring 'We’re the leaders of the pack'." James Robertson of Daily Mirror deemed the video "perfect", praising the "sexy faces and high-tempo choreography."

== Live performances ==
Girls Aloud first performed "Something New" on 16 November 2012 at Children in Need 2012. The group also performed the song at the Wembley special of Strictly Come Dancing, aired on 18 November 2012. Girls Aloud also joined Capital FM's 2012 Jingle Bell Ball, and they included "Something New" on the setlist. On 31 December 2012, they also performed it at the New Year's Eve special of Top of the Pops. In 2013, "Something New" was the last song performed during the before the encore of the Ten: The Hits Tour. During The Girls Aloud Show in 2024, it was performed as the third number.

== Formats and track listings ==
These are the formats and track listings of major single releases of "Something New".

- Maxi single
1. "Something New" – 3:19
2. "Something New" (Jim Elliot Remix) – 3:27
3. "Something New" (The Alias Radio Edit) – 3:17
4. "Something New" (Fred Falke Remix) – 7:01
- 7" vinyl
1. "Something New" – 3:19
2. "Something New" (Seamus Haji Radio Mix) – 3:54
- Remixes EP
1. "Something New" – 3:19
2. "Something New" (Jim Elliot Remix) – 3:27
3. "Something New" (The Alias Radio Edit) – 3:17
4. "Something New" (Manhattan Clique Remix) – 5:34

Digital EP

1. "Something New" – 3:20
2. "Something New" (Jim Elliot Remix) – 3:27
3. "Something New" (The Alias Radio Edit) – 3:17
4. "Something New" (Fred Falke Remix) – 7:01
5. "Something New" (Manhattan Clique Remix) – 5:34
6. "Girls Aloud Megamix" – 7:27
7. "Something New" (Instrumental) – 3:19
8. "Something New" (Seamus Haji Radio Mix) – 3:51

== Credits and personnel ==
Credits adapted from the liner notes of Ten.

Recording

- Mixed at MixStar Studios in Virginia Beach, Virginia.
- Mastered at 360 Mastering in Fulham, London.

Personnel

- Bass guitar – Tim Deal
- Design, art direction – Studio Fury
- Drums – Florrie Arnold
- Engineer – Ben Taylor, Matt Gray, Toby Scott
- Mixing engineer – John Hanes
- Assistant mixing engineer – Phil Seaford
- Keyboards, programming – Brian Higgins, Luke Fitton, Matt Gray, Miranda Cooper, Tim Deal, Toby Scott
- Mastering – Dick Beetham
- Mixing – Serban Ghenea
- Photography – Benjamin Lennox
- Production – Brian Higgins
- Programming – Annie Yuill, Niara Scarlett
- Writers – Brian Higgins, Wayne Hector, Tim Deal, Matt Gray, Carla Marie Williams, Tove Nilsson, Nicola Roberts, Florrie Arnold

== Charts ==
=== Weekly charts ===
Chart (2012–2013)	Peak position
Euro Digital Songs (Billboard)	13
Hungary (Rádiós Top 40)	3
Ireland (IRMA)	4
Poland Dance (ZPAV)	36
Poland (Polish Airplay TV)	5
Scottish Singles Sales (Official Charts)	2
Slovakia Airplay (ČNS IFPI)	16
UK Singles (Official Charts)	2
UK Airplay (Music Week)	10

=== Year-end charts ===
Chart (2012)	Position
UK Singles (OCC)	159
Chart (2013)	Position
Hungary (Rádiós Top 40)	77

== Certifications ==
Region	Certification	Certified units/sales
United Kingdom (BPI)	Silver	200,000^{‡}
^{‡} Sales+streaming figures based on certification alone.

== See also ==
- List of UK top-ten singles in 2012
