= Girls Aloud =

British-Irish girl group

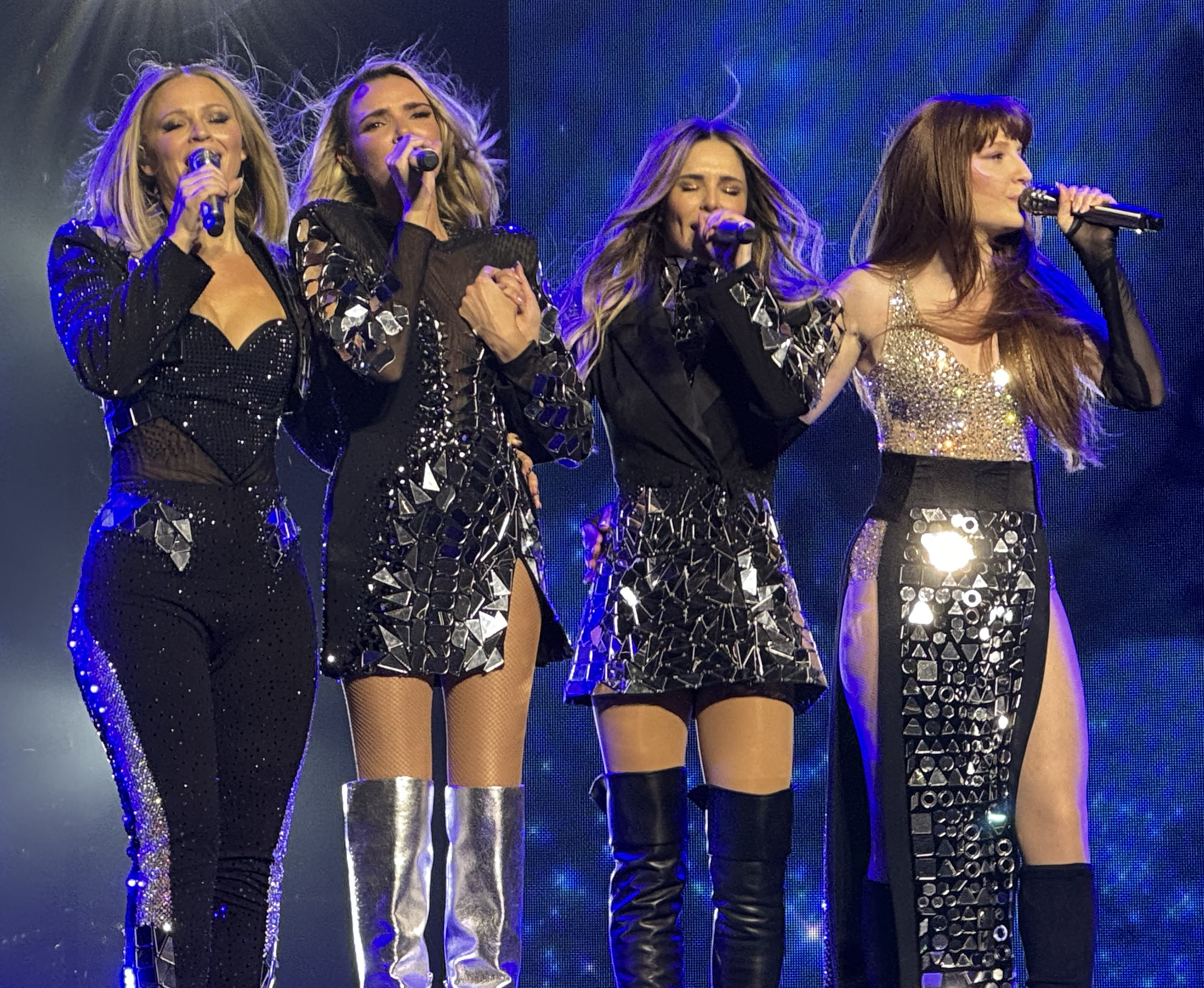
- Girls Aloud performing at the O2 Arena in June 2024 during the Girls Aloud Show (L–R): Walsh, Coyle, Cheryl, and Roberts

Background information
- Origin: London, England
- Genres: Pop; electropop; dance-pop; pop rock; progressive pop
- Years active: 2002–2009; 2012–2013; 2023–present
- Labels: Polydor; Fascination
- Members: Cheryl; Nadine Coyle; Nicola Roberts; Kimberley Walsh
- Past members: Sarah Harding
- Website: girlsaloud.com

Girls Aloud are a British-Irish pop girl group formed through the ITV talent show Popstars: The Rivals in 2002. The group's original line-up comprised Cheryl, Nadine Coyle, Sarah Harding, Nicola Roberts and Kimberley Walsh. They achieved immediate success with their debut single, "Sound of the Underground", which became the 2002 UK Christmas number one. Girls Aloud subsequently became one of the most commercially successful British girl groups of the 21st century, achieving twenty consecutive top ten singles on the UK singles chart, including four number ones, and two number one albums.

Throughout most of their career, Girls Aloud worked with the songwriting and production team Xenomania, led by Brian Higgins. Their music combined mainstream pop with elements of electronic music, rock and dance, frequently using unconventional song structures and abrupt shifts in style. The partnership produced songs including "Love Machine", "Biology", "Something Kinda Ooooh", "Call the Shots" and "The Promise", and attracted critical acclaim for its inventive approach to commercial pop.

Girls Aloud released five studio albums between 2003 and 2008, including their best-selling album Out of Control (2008). Their first greatest hits collection, The Sound of Girls Aloud (2006), sold more than one million copies. The group has been nominated for five BRIT Awards; "The Promise" won the Brit Award for British Single in 2009. After entering a hiatus later that year, the group reunited in 2012 for their tenth anniversary with their second greatest hits album, Ten, and its lead single "Something New". The group formally disbanded following their first reunion tour's final concert in March 2013.

Harding died from breast cancer in September 2021 at the age of 39. The four surviving members subsequently reunited for charitable activities in her memory and returned to performing with The Girls Aloud Show, a concert tour held in 2024. Conceived as both a celebration of the group's catalogue and a tribute to Harding, it became the largest UK arena tour of that year. The group has also overseen a series of anniversary reissues of their recordings.

== History ==
=== 2002: Popstars: The Rivals ===
Girls Aloud were formed on 30 November 2002 on ITV's Popstars: The Rivals. The concept of the programme, hosted by Big Brother presenter Davina McCall, was to produce a boy band and a girl group who would be "rivals" and compete for the 2002 Christmas number one single. Following the initial success of Hear'Say (winners of the original Popstars show), several thousand applicants attended auditions across the United Kingdom in hope of being selected. Ten girls and ten boys were chosen as finalists by judges Pete Waterman, Louis Walsh and Spice Girls member Geri Halliwell. However, two of these were disqualified before the live shows began: Hazel Kaneswaran was found to be too old to participate, while Nicola Ward refused to sign the contract, claiming the pay the group would receive was too low. Kimberley Walsh and Nicola Roberts were chosen as their replacements.

During October and November, the finalists took to the stage participating in weekly Saturday night live performances (alternating week-by-week between the girls and boys). Each week the contestant polling the fewest phone votes was eliminated until the final line-ups of the groups emerged. The five girls who made it into the group were Cheryl Tweedy, Nicola Roberts, Nadine Coyle, Kimberley Walsh, and Sarah Harding; Javine Hylton missed out on a place in the group, despite previous expectations that she would be placed in the line-up. The group was named Girls Aloud and managed by Louis Walsh, until 2005 when Hilary Shaw replaced him.

The new group competed with the boys' winning group, One True Voice, to claim 2002's Christmas number-one single. Girls Aloud won the battle with their single "Sound of the Underground", produced by Brian Higgins and Xenomania. The song spent four consecutive weeks at number one and was certified platinum in March 2003. The song received critical acclaim; Alexis Petridis of The Guardian stated that "it proved a first: it was a reality pop record that didn't make you want to do physical harm to everyone involved in its manufacture".

=== 2002–2005: Sound of the Underground and What Will the Neighbours Say? ===
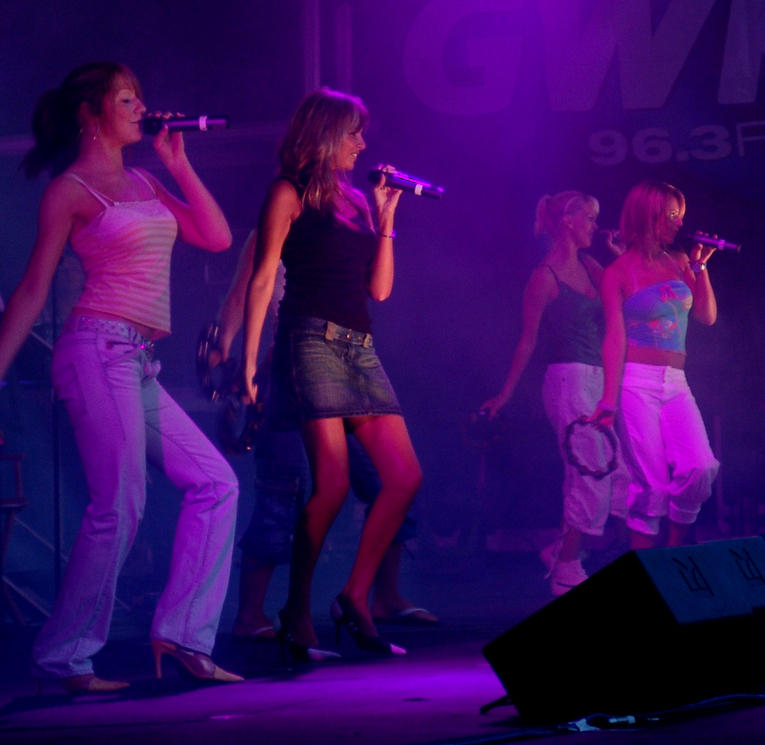
Girls Aloud performing at the Bristol International Balloon Fiesta in August 2004

After the success of their first single "Sound of the Underground", Girls Aloud spent five months recording the follow-up single and their debut album. Sound of the Underground was completed in April 2003 and released the following month. The album entered the charts at number two and was certified platinum by the British Phonographic Industry. The second single, "No Good Advice", was also released in May 2003 to similar success. Girls Aloud's third single, "Life Got Cold", charted at number three in August 2003. In November 2003, Girls Aloud released a cover version of the Pointer Sisters' 1980s dance hit "Jump". The single, which charted at number two, accompanied a new edition of Sound of the Underground.

After a brief hiatus, Girls Aloud released "The Show" in June 2004, the first single from What Will the Neighbours Say?, the group's second album. The single entered the charts at number two. The next single, "Love Machine", also peaked at number two in September 2004. Girls Aloud then recorded a cover of The Pretenders' "I'll Stand by You" which was released as the official Children in Need charity single. The song was not well received by critics. The cover became Girls Aloud's second number-one single, holding the position for two weeks.

The album What Will the Neighbours Say? was entirely written and produced by Xenomania. Upon its release on 29 November 2004, the album charted just outside of the top five and was quickly certified platinum. The final single from the album, "Wake Me Up", was released in February 2005. It charted at number four, making it their first to miss the top three. In early 2005, the group were nominated for a BRIT Award for Best Pop Act. Following the album's success, Girls Aloud announced their first tour, the What Will the Neighbours Say...? Tour, which took place in May 2005. The group also released their first DVD, Girls on Film.

=== 2005–2007: Chemistry and The Sound of Girls Aloud ===
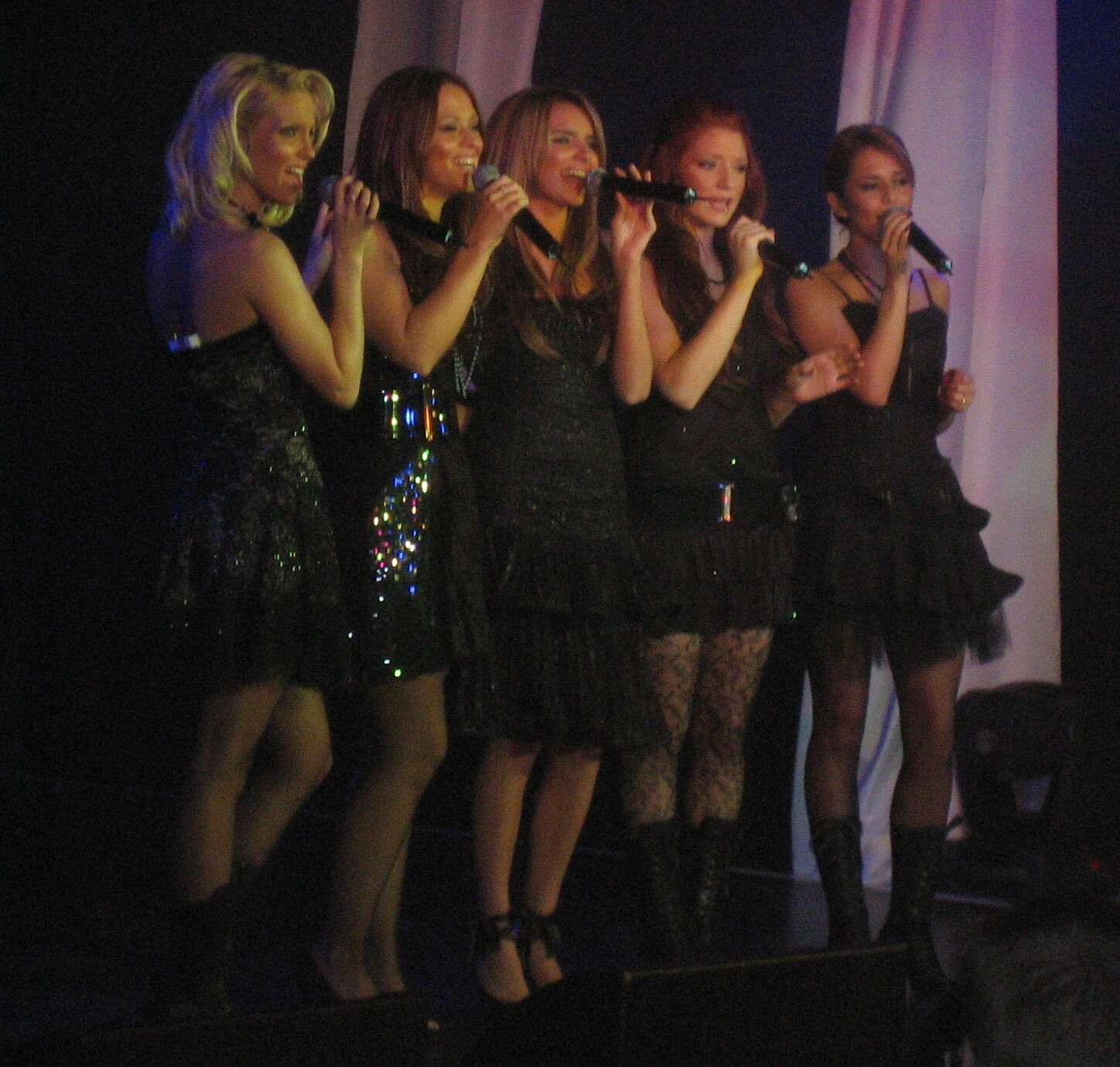
Girls Aloud performing at the Capital Radio Help a London Child fundraiser in December 2005

Following their first tour, Girls Aloud began work on their third studio album, Chemistry. The album peaked on the UK Albums Charts at number 11 and received platinum certification. The first single from the album, "Long Hot Summer", was released in August 2005. The single ended Girls Aloud's run of top five singles when it charted at number seven. The follow-up single from the album, "Biology", was released in November 2005. The song was critically acclaimed; Peter Cashmore of The Guardian labelled it "the best pop single of the last decade". The release was followed by a cover of Dee C. Lee's "See the Day", released in the Christmas week of 2005. Following this, they presented a one-off TV Special, Christmas Mania, on ITV, where they sang songs taken from their Christmas album. Girls Aloud won the Heart Award for the single at the O_{2} Silver Clef Lunch. The group travelled to Australia and New Zealand in February 2006 to release "Biology" and Chemistry. Despite a one-week promotional tour, "Biology" peaked at number 26 on the ARIA Singles Chart, failing to break the group in the Australian market. "Whole Lotta History", the fourth and final single to be taken from Chemistry, was released in March 2006 and charted at number six in the UK.

In 2005, Girls Aloud filmed a one-off documentary entitled Girls Aloud: Home Truths for ITV2. The success of the show later made way for Girls Aloud: Off the Record, a six-part fly-on-the-wall documentary series for E4. Girls Aloud then appeared in an episode of Ghosthunting with... (without Nadine) towards the end of 2006, in which Yvette Fielding guided them through haunted locations. In May 2006, Girls Aloud embarked on their first arena tour, named Chemistry: The Tour. In the same month, Girls Aloud were moved to Fascination Records, a sub-label of Polydor Records.

In October 2006, Girls Aloud released their first greatest hits collection, The Sound of Girls Aloud: The Greatest Hits. It debuted at number one on the UK album chart and went on to sell over one million copies. The album was accompanied by the single "Something Kinda Ooooh". Girls Aloud became the first British act to reach the top five purely on download sales; the single peaked at number three following its physical release. The next single was a cover of "I Think We're Alone Now" which peaked at number four on the UK Singles Chart. In March 2007, Girls Aloud collaborated with fellow British girl group Sugababes for the cover of the song "Walk This Way" by Aerosmith. Billed as "Sugababes vs. Girls Aloud", the song served as the official single for Comic Relief which became the group's third number one. In May 2007, Girls Aloud embarked on their third tour, The Greatest Hits Tour.

=== 2007–2009: Tangled Up and Out of Control ===
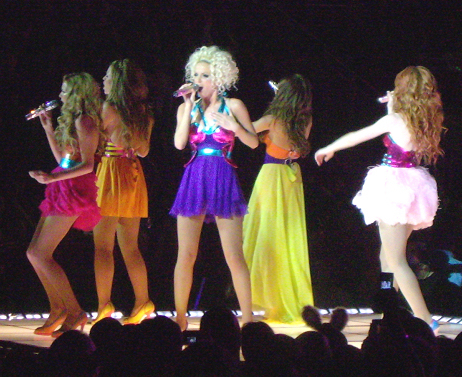
Girls Aloud performing in London during the Tangled Up Tour in May 2008

Girls Aloud released their fourth studio album, Tangled Up, in November 2007. The first single from the album, "Sexy! No No No..." peaked at number five on the UK Singles Chart. The second single, "Call the Shots", entered the top three. The third and final single from the album, "Can't Speak French", continued Girls Aloud's top ten streak. The release of the single coincided with Girls Aloud's second television series, The Passions of Girls Aloud. The show revolved around each member, with the exception of Coyle, pursues aspirations outside the group. The group received their second Brit Award nomination in 2008, nominated for the Best British Group award. In May 2008, Girls Aloud embarked on the Tangled Up Tour which consisted of 34 concerts around the United Kingdom.

Girls Aloud then recorded two tracks for the soundtrack to the 2007 film, St Trinian's. They made a cameo appearance in the film, as the school band. The soundtrack was released on 10 December 2007, and the music video for "Theme to St. Trinian's" premiered in December 2007.

In November 2008, Girls Aloud released their fifth studio album, Out of Control. The album entered the UK Albums Chart at number one and became their most successful studio album to date, being certified double platinum. The album's lead single, "The Promise", became the group's fourth number one on the UK Singles Chart. The single also returned the group to the top two on the Irish Singles Chart. "The Promise" was awarded Best British Single at the 2009 Brit Awards; the group also performed the song during the ceremony. For the promotion of the album, Girls Aloud appeared in a variety show entitled The Girls Aloud Party which aired on 13 December 2008 on ITV.

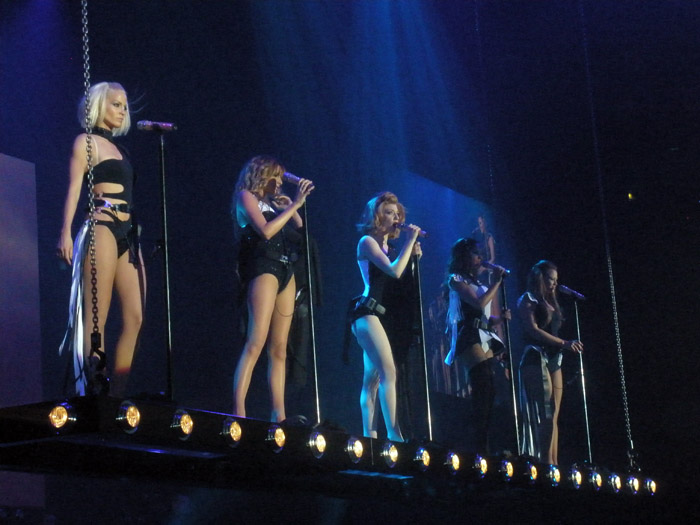
Girls Aloud performing in Manchester during the Out of Control Tour in April 2009

The second single from Out of Control, "The Loving Kind", was produced by Xenomania. Peaking at number ten, it became the group's twentieth consecutive top ten single. The final single from the album, "Untouchable" was released in April 2009. It peaked at number 11 on the UK Singles Chart, becoming the first single of the group to miss the top ten. The group embarked on the Out of Control Tour, from April to June 2009. A singles boxset collection was released to coincide with the tour.

In February 2009, Girls Aloud signed a new record deal with Fascination that would see the group release another three studio albums. In July 2009, the group announced that they were taking a year-long hiatus to pursue solo projects, and would reunite for a new studio album in 2010 which did not materialise. In September 2009, the group briefly interrupted the hiatus to perform two shows supporting Coldplay along with Jay-Z at Wembley Stadium.

=== 2012–2013: Ten ===
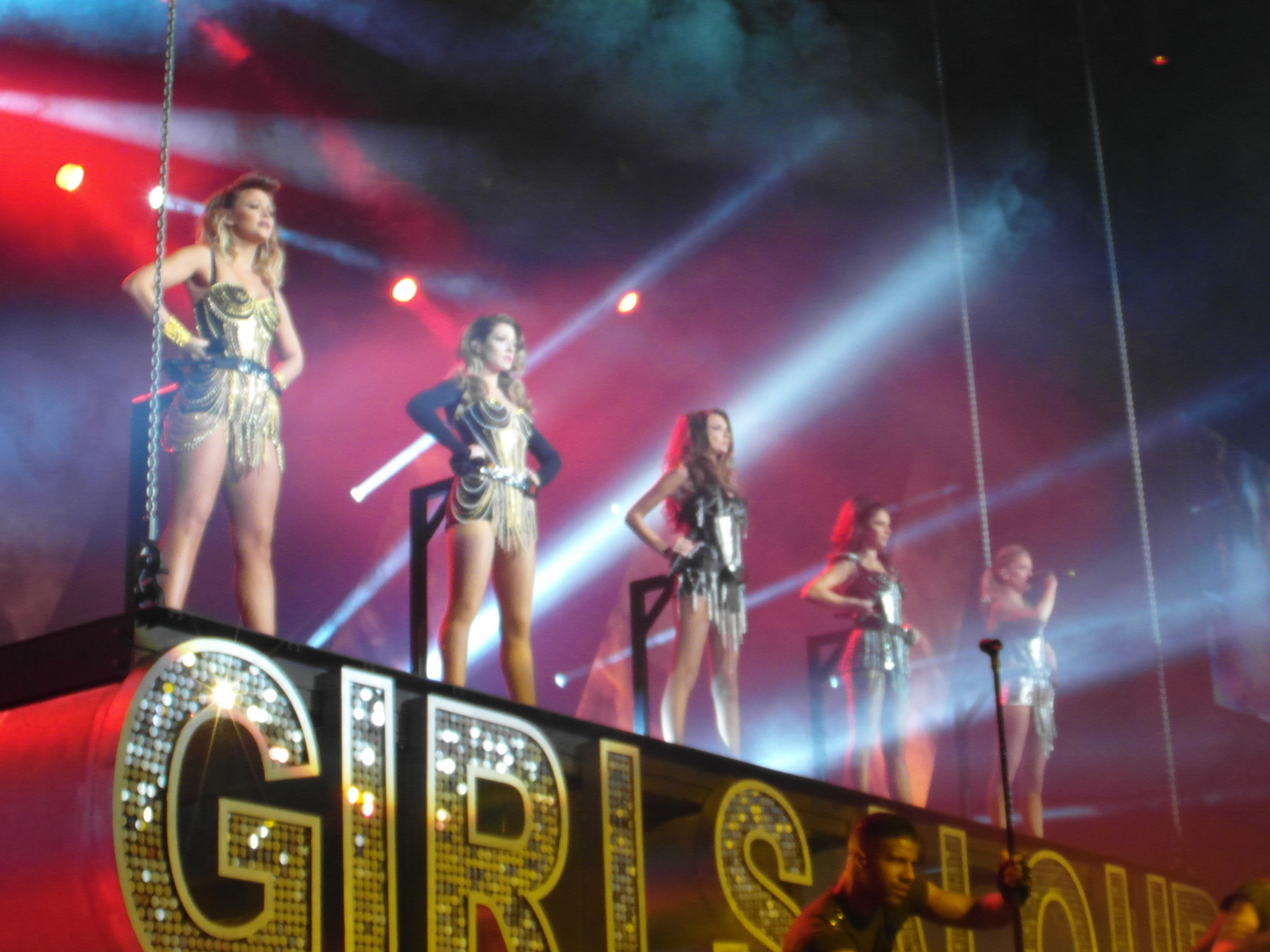
Girls Aloud performing during the Ten: The Hits Tour in March 2013

After three years of hiatus, Girls Aloud reunited for the group's tenth anniversary. On 16 November 2012, the group released their new single, "Something New" – the official charity single for Children in Need. The single peaked at number two on the UK Singles Chart. The group released their second greatest hits compilation, Ten, on 23 November 2012. The second single taken from Ten, "Beautiful 'Cause You Love Me," was released on 17 December 2012 and failed to chart in the top 40. A documentary special entitled Girls Aloud: Ten Years at the Top aired on ITV1 on 15 December 2012. In February 2013, the group embarked on Ten: The Hits Tour. On 20 March 2013, the group performed their final concert at Echo Arena Liverpool. A few hours later, they announced their split on Twitter.

=== 2021: Death of Sarah Harding ===
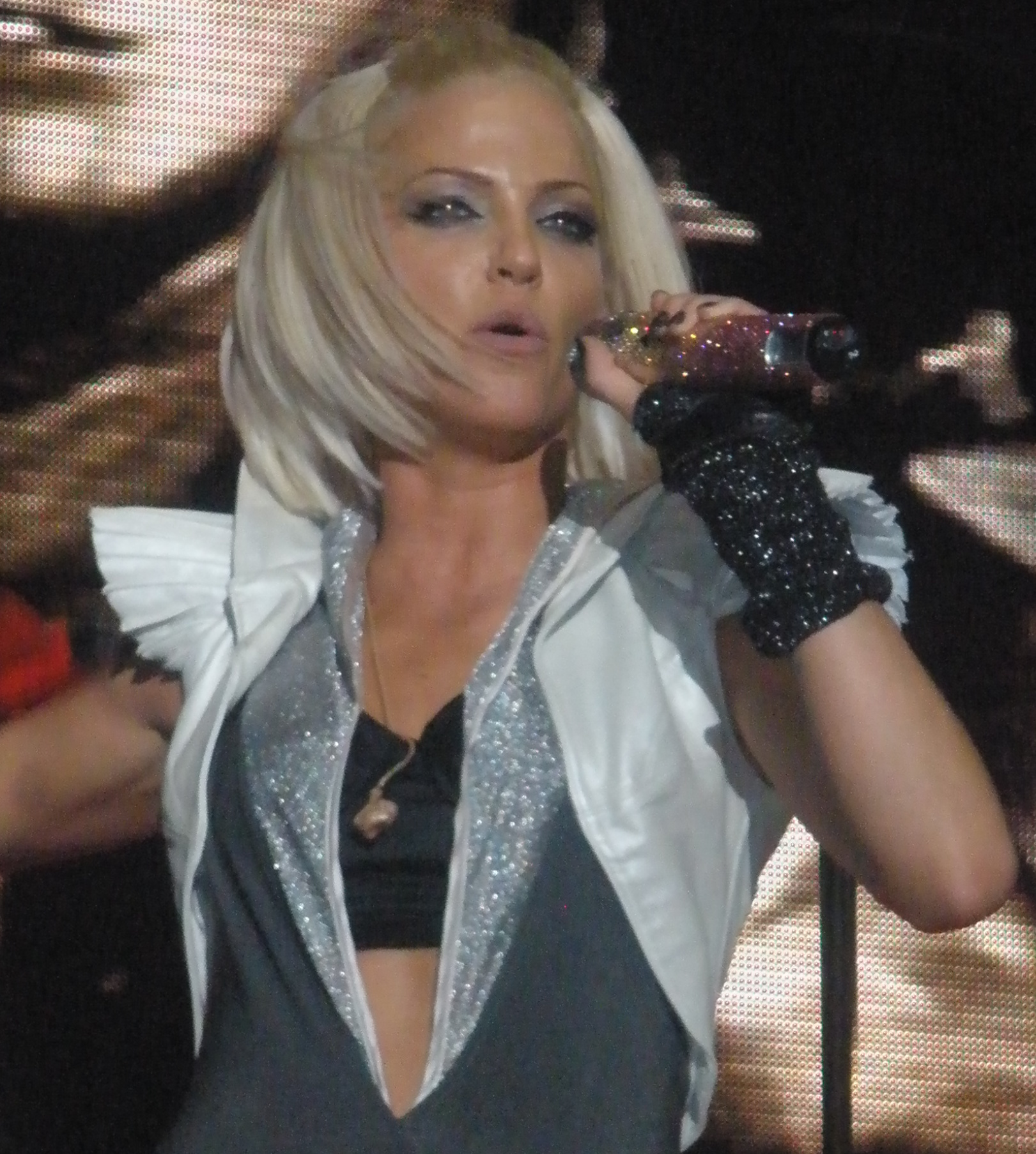
Harding in 2009

On 26 August 2020, group member Sarah Harding stated that she had been diagnosed with breast cancer that had advanced to "other parts" of her body. In March 2021, she said that the disease was terminal and that she "won't see another Christmas". She died on 5 September 2021 at the age of 39. On 24 July 2022, Girls Aloud appeared in Hyde Park, London, to raise awareness and money for breast cancer research. Tweedy, Roberts and Coyle participated in the event, with Walsh taking part in a remote event.

=== 2023–present: The Girls Aloud Show and reissue campaign ===
In November 2023, the group announced a reunion tour for the following year, the Girls Aloud Show, serving as a dedication in memory of Harding and a "celebration" of the group's music. Featuring thirty shows, the tour took place from May to June 2024, commencing in Dublin, Ireland, and concluding in Liverpool, England. It was the most successful UK arena tour of the year. On 14 October 2024, it was announced one of the London concerts at the O_{2} Arena was filmed for ITV1 and ITVX, and will feature "sneak peeks behind-the-scenes" and air as a one-hour special. The special, billed as The Girls Aloud Show: Live at the O2, aired the following month on 17 November. Physical formats were released in June 2025. In November 2024, it was announced Girls Aloud would re-release "I'll Stand by You", featuring newly-discovered lead vocals from Harding from the original recording sessions. The release, subtitled "Sarah's Version" was released as that year's Children in Need single.

Girls Aloud released deluxe versions of their five studio albums between 2023 and 2026, each containing the album era's B-sides and remixes, as well as previously unreleased songs or alternative versions. The twentieth anniversary edition of Chemistry included the promotional single, "Singapore (Definitive Version)". The group also issued the first standalone release of their holiday album, Christmas 'Round at Ours, originally released in December 2005 as a limited-edition bonus disc accompanying Chemistry.

== Other endeavours ==
Girls Aloud partnered with Mattel in 2005 to produce Fashion Fever Barbies. Each member designed the outfit and look of a doll modelled on herself. In addition to live DVDs of their tours and both of Girls Aloud's television series, the group have also released Girls on Film and Style. Official calendars were also issued annually from 2004 to 2009, the only exception being 2005. Girls Aloud co-wrote an autobiography titled Dreams That Glitter – Our Story. The book, named after a lyric in "Call the Shots", was published in October 2008 through the Transworld imprint Bantam Press. Before the release, OK! magazine bought the rights to preview and serialise the book.

In 2007, Girls Aloud signed a £1.25M one-year deal to endorse hair care brand Sunsilk. The girls filmed a television advertisement and appeared in magazine advertisements, with each of the five members being the face of a different shampoo. The same year, Girls Aloud also signed a deal with the UK division of Samsung. They endorsed mobile phones and MP3 players, made personal appearances and sang at Samsung events, and contributed to competition prizes, among other activities. The Samsung F210 Purple came with a 1GB memory card featuring Girls Aloud content. Girls Aloud appeared in television advertisements for Nintendo DS the following year. The group signed a deal to front a promotional campaign for a new low-calorie KitKat bar called "Senses" in March 2008. Sales increased 6.8% in the United Kingdom.

Beginning in 2009, Girls Aloud teamed with Eylure to release five sets of false eyelashes, each set designed by a different member of the band. A range of festival-themed lashes followed in 2010, while limited edition "10th Anniversary" lashes were released in 2012. Similarly, to celebrate their tenth anniversary, each member designed a charm bracelet for Pandora, available as either a complete bracelet or a "starter" bracelet.

=== Philanthropy ===
All five members of the group have been involved in charity work. Girls Aloud's cover of The Pretenders' "I'll Stand by You" was released as the official 2004 Children in Need single, with proceeds going to the charity. Nicola Roberts said, "Hopefully if our single does well it's a lot of money going to the charity." Their cover of Aerosmith and Run DMC's "Walk This Way", a collaboration with the Sugababes, was the official charity single for Comic Relief in 2007, recorded at Comic Relief co-founder and trustee Richard Curtis' request. Kimberley Walsh said, "It's a fantastic song and hopefully will raise tons of money for people living in really difficult situations here and in Africa." In March 2009, Cheryl, Kimberley Walsh, and various other celebrities climbed Mount Kilimanjaro in aid of Comic Relief. Girls Aloud celebrated their 10 years as a group by releasing another Children in Need single, "Something New", which they performed on the Children in Need TV special on 16 November 2012.

== Artistry ==
=== Musical style ===
Girls Aloud worked closely with Brian Higgins and his songwriting and production team Xenomania throughout their career. Xenomania produced all of Girls Aloud's albums and singles, excluding nine songs from their debut album, Sound of the Underground, the charity single "Walk This Way" and two songs from Ten. Of Higgins and Xenomania, Girls Aloud's former manager Louis Walsh says, "He just makes great songs for radio. They just jump out at you and stay in your brain." In a review of the group's debut single "Sound of the Underground", The Guardian's Alexis Petridis exclaimed it "proved a first: it was a reality pop record that didn't make you want to do physical harm to everyone involved in its manufacture." In response to Girls Aloud's debut album, Jacqueline Hodges of BBC Music said that "Higgins injects an element of instant-catchy-cool to the songs without going overboard in trying to shape uber-chic dance floor hits."

Petridis of The Guardian described What Will the Neighbours Say? as "a great album: funny, clever, immediate, richly inventive." He later wrote that Chemistry is "a record that dispenses with the tiresome business of verses and instead opts for songs apparently constructed by stitching eight different choruses together." Talia Kraines of BBC Music exclaimed that Girls Aloud "have resuscitated [pop music's] corpse by wedding chart-friendly melodies to experimental avant-garde sounds". "Biology" was described as "about as far from tired formula as you can possibly get. It sounds like three separate melodies condensed into one." Popjustice referred to the song as "pop music which redefines the supposed boundaries of pop music." In a review for 2007's "Sexy! No No No...", Nick Levine of Digital Spy complimented Xenomania's work on the song: sacrificing "conventional song structure in the name of keeping [...] hooks coming thick and fast – and quite right too."

Despite being most generally associated with the pop genre, Girls Aloud have experimented with other genres, in particular rock music with singles like "Sound of the Underground", "Graffiti My Soul", "Wake Me Up" and "Sexy! No No No...".

=== Influences ===
The band members themselves are known to be fans of artists such as Ne-Yo and Oasis.

The group's debut album Sound of the Underground takes influence from a number of 1980s genres, such as synthpop, power pop, and new wave, and 1990s styles like big beat, drum and bass, and garage. The album received comparisons to girl groups such as Bananarama, the Bangles, and the Spice Girls. Similarities to Kylie Minogue and Madonna were also noted. A majority of the songs make use of guitars and electronic beats. The rise of indie rock also inspired Brian Higgins to "blur the edges between commercial music and so-called 'indie' music." He continued, "pop music was on its backside and indie music was about to rise, through The Strokes and everything else. We were an independent company and we were as indie as the other bands around us. The guitar riff on No Good Advice is very very similar to the riff on the track Michael by Franz Ferdinand." What Will the Neighbours Say? further explores different subgenres of pop, especially electropop. Synthesisers are more prominent on the album, although the usage of guitar remains prominent in several songs. The backing track to "Love Machine", composed by Xenomania musicians Tim Powell and Nick Coler, was inspired by the Smiths, while "Wake Me Up" includes a guitar riff inspired by garage rock.

Chemistry takes influences from a wide variety of sources, including "everything from French chanson to piano-pounding blues to the clipped R&B of the Small Faces". Rapping in the same vein as artists like Betty Boo and Neneh Cherry is prominent. Yahoo! Music says "there's nary a 'formula' in sight. There are as many sudden tonal and tempo switches as the tricksiest Chicago art rock band. And all but one song here gives guitars a starring role." The songs are noticeably less rooted in electronic music, although "Swinging London Town" is "a dark, squiggly synth pop epic a la Pet Shop Boys" and "It's Magic" is composed of "little Röyksopp-like keyboard riffs". Alternatively, Tangled Up features a dancier, more electronic sound, inspired by the success of their 2006 single "Something Kinda Ooooh". "Call the Shots", "Close to Love", and "Girl Overboard" are all electropop numbers reminiscent of 1980s music. However, "Control of the Knife" is more inspired by reggae and ska, while "Black Jacks" recalls "sixties psychedelica". Out of Control features a number of songs inspired by 1980s electropop, while also exploring retro styles. "The Promise" is a 1960s Spector-influenced number, while "Rolling Back the Rivers in Time" was compared to the works of Burt Bacharach.

== Legacy ==
"Sound of the Underground" (2002)
Girls Aloud's first number-one single in the UK, and appeared on several lists of songs that defined the 2000s.

Girls Aloud's legacy has often been discussed in relation to their collaboration with the songwriting and production team Xenomania. The group's debut single, "Sound of the Underground", and Sugababes' "Round Round", both produced by Xenomania, have been called "two huge groundbreaking hits" that helped redefine British pop in the early 2000s. Emily MacKay of NME characterised the songs as representing "a whole new kind of pop". "Sound of the Underground" has since appeared on several retrospective lists of defining songs of the decade: The Telegraph ranked it 15th on its list of 100 songs that defined the 2000s, NME placed it at number 39, and Spinner.com named it the eighth-best British song of the decade.

The group's critical reputation strengthened over the course of the 2000s, particularly around their more experimental singles and albums. In 2009, Pitchfork ranked the 2005 single "Biology" at number 245 on its list of the top 500 tracks of the decade, while The Times included 2007's Tangled Up at number 62 on its list of the decade's best pop albums. MSN also listed 2005's Chemistry among the best albums of the 2000s. Critics frequently contrasted the group's inventive production and sustained success with the dominance of other genres "as pop fell out of favor in the 2000s." Reviewing the group's 2008 Tangled Up Tour, David Pollock of The Independent wrote that "Girls Aloud remain confidently the only pop show in town." The Times stated, "Not since ABBA and Michael Jackson has pure pop been so unanimously praised."

Girls Aloud have also been noted as one of the few British reality television acts to achieve longevity. Reviews of their debut album commented on the quality of the material in comparison with other releases by TV talent show contestants. In 2004, David Hooper of BBC Music described the group as "British pop royalty" and wrote that, "in the ultra-fickle world of TV-generated pop, Girls Aloud have real staying power." Andrew Lynch of entertainment.ie similarly observed that although "Girls Aloud really shouldn't have made it as far as a second album", the group had "a knack of coming up with utterly infectious pop songs".

Commercially, the group were named Britain's biggest-selling girl group of the 21st century so far in 2012, with UK sales of more than 4.3 million singles and 4.0 million albums. Guinness World Records listed them as the "Most Successful Reality TV Group" in its 2007 and 2011 editions and recognised them in its 2008 edition for the most consecutive top-ten entries in the UK by a female group. Collectively, the members of Girls Aloud earned £30 million by 2010. (Note: (a value equivalent to £48 million in 2026)) All five members were included in a 2010 list of Britain's richest stars under 30.

Girls Aloud's music has been praised by artists from outside mainstream pop. Bono described the group as "at the cutting edge of pop music" and referred to himself as a fan. Chris Martin called them "the ultimate form of life," while Julie Burchill described Girls Aloud as "simply the most perfect pop group since the Monkees." Their songs have also been covered by artists including Arctic Monkeys, Bloc Party, CMAT and Coldplay, among others.

== Members ==
- Cheryl (2002–2009, 2012–2013, since 2023)
- Kimberley Walsh (2002–2009, 2012–2013, since 2023)
- Nadine Coyle (2002–2009, 2012–2013, since 2023)
- Nicola Roberts (2002–2009, 2012–2013, since 2023)
- Sarah Harding (2002–2009, 2012–2013, died 2021)

== Discography ==
- Sound of the Underground (2003)
- What Will the Neighbours Say? (2004)
- Chemistry (2005)
- Tangled Up (2007)
- Out of Control (2008)

== Tours ==
- What Will the Neighbours Say...? Tour (2005)
- Chemistry Tour (2006)
- Greatest Hits Tour (2007)
- Tangled Up Tour (2008)
- Out of Control Tour (2009)
- Ten: The Hits Tour (2013)
- The Girls Aloud Show (2024)

== See also ==
- List of awards and nominations received by Girls Aloud
- List of best-selling girl groups
- List of Girls Aloud songs
- R v Walker
