= Beautiful 'Cause You Love Me =

Single by Girls Aloud

from the album Ten
- Released: 17 December 2012
- Recorded: May 2012
- Genre: Pop
- Length: 3:29
- Label: Polydor
- Songwriter: Rachel Moulden
- Producer: Jim Eliot

Girls Aloud singles chronology
"Something New" (2012)	"Beautiful 'Cause You Love Me" (2012)	"I'll Stand by You (Sarah's Version)" (2024)

Music video
- "Beautiful 'Cause You Love Me" on YouTube

"Beautiful 'Cause You Love Me" is a song recorded by British girl group Girls Aloud. It appears on their second compilation album, Ten (2012). It was written by Rachel Moulden and produced by Jim Eliot. The song received mixed reviews from music critics, some of whom thought ballads were not the group's best efforts. Upon the release of Ten, it charted at number 97 on the UK Singles Chart. The accompanying music video, directed by Paul Caslin, consists mostly of beauty shots from each member. The song was performed on programmes such as Children in Need 2012 and Top of the Pops.

== Background and composition ==
Beautiful 'Cause You Love Me
A 21-second sample of "Beautiful Cause You Love Me"'s chorus verse, where the group sings "Right now the whole world could call me ugly / So what? To you, I'm not / You don't love me cause I'm beautiful".

To follow the success of "Something New", the group decided to release "Beautiful 'Cause You Love Me" as the second single from their compilation album Ten. The song officially premiered on BBC Radio 2 on 13 November 2012, while the digital release took place on 17 December 2012. It was also sent to mainstream radio in the United Kingdom.

"Beautiful 'Cause You Love Me" was written by Rachel Moulden and produced by Jim Eliot. It is the second Girls Aloud single to not be produced by Xenomania, their previous one being "Walk This Way". Its lyric was deemed "striking and memorable" by Sam Lansky of Idolator. Amy Sciaretto of PopCrush noted the lyric addresses "how the love of a good man can make you beautiful, and that love, not looks, are what’s important in life."

Nadine Coyle has said "Beautiful 'Cause You Love Me" was almost the lead single from Ten instead of "Something New" but she threatened to not take part in the reunion until the release plans had changed. She admitted to disliking the song as she felt it was not a strong comeback single for the group and did not agree with its message, feeling all women are beautiful regardless of whether anyone loves them. This is also the only Girls Aloud single where Coyle does not sing co-lead vocals.

== Reception ==
=== Critical response ===
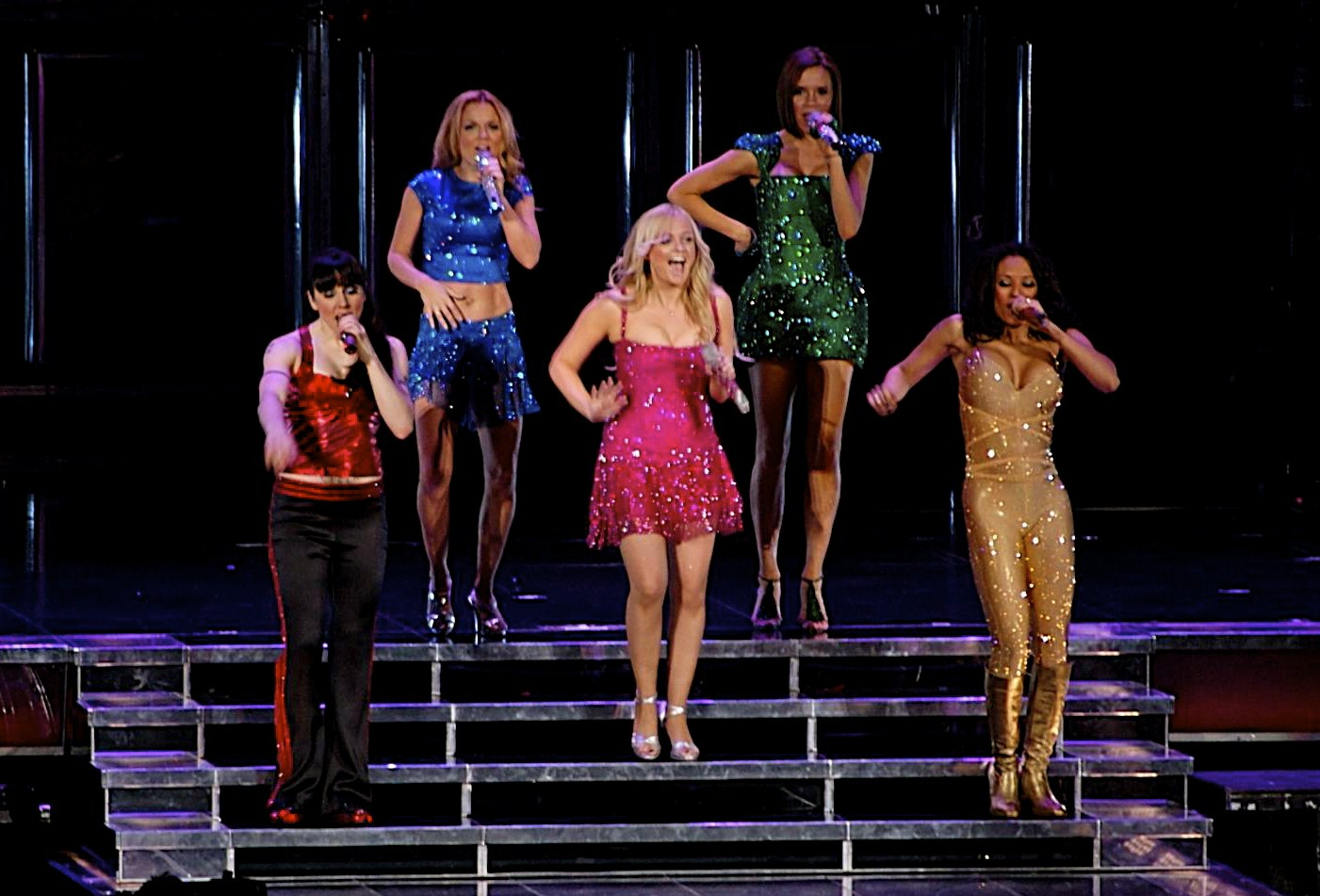
NME compared the song to the Spice Girls' song "Too Much".

"Beautiful 'Cause You Love Me" received mixed reviews from music critics. Ian Wade of BBC Music called the song a "blub-friendly empowerment cut complete with its own fireworks". Lee Williscroft-Ferris of So So Gay stated that the song "is as schmaltzy as the title suggests, the lyric ‘You don’t love me ’cause I’m beautiful / I’m beautiful ’cause you love me’ dripping in the kind of self-indulgent emotion one might not expect from the band. Still, it’s a classy number." Rebecca Twomey of Marie Claire deemed it a "silky smooth love song," while Chris Younie of 4Music said that the "emotionally-charged, touching ballad ... may not be a typical Girls Aloud pop-dance banger, but trust us when we say it's still amazing." A NME critic said the track "ain't bad", concluded that it occupies "a similar lyrical space to Sugababes' 'Unpretty' rewrite 'Ugly', and a similar space in the canon to "Too Much" by the Spice Girls."

However, Douglas Wolk of Pitchfork Media stated the song, "just drag the album [Ten] down... in particular, belongs on the same icky-valentine shelf as James Blunt's "You're Beautiful". Jon O'Brien of omg! called the song "an overly-slushy love song which could quite easily have been a reject from Cheryl Cole's last album." Lucas Villa of Examiner described the song as "about feeling pretty in the presence of a loved one", and yet described the song as "awkwardly reminiscent of the Mean Girls line: “I don't hate you because you're fat. You're fat because I hate you.” A Contact Music reviewer considered the song "big and ballady and seems to be more in keeping with the big saccharine American pop tradition of such staples rather," but stated that "the biggest overriding problem with this track though is that the beginning of it reminds us, for some unsure reason, of Tara Palmer-Tomkinson's recent disastrous foray into the world of pop. Something no one should ever have to witness." Amy Sciaretto of PopCrush wasn't "sure that Girls Aloud are the correct people to deliver that message" because they are "five stunning women who likely never had anyone tell ‘em they were ugly." Sam Lansky of Idolator thought that the track "may not rival Girls Aloud's best work, but it's not a complete disappointment." Lewis Corner of Digital Spy said that Girls Aloud wouldn't be a true pop group "if they solely focused on tracks of a high BPM rate and ignored a good ol' fashioned slowie," adding that ballads released by them "have always received a frosty reception on their first few plays, and this one was no different."

=== Chart performance ===
Upon the release of Ten, "Beautiful 'Cause You Love Me" charted at number 97 on the UK Singles Chart. During the release week of the single, it failed to chart at the UK Singles Chart and it became the first single of the group to not chart inside the top-forty.

== Music video ==
A scene of the video where Girls Aloud join each other in a living room.

The accompanying music video premiered on 4 December 2012 through the group's VEVO account and was directed by Paul Caslin. Opening with a drop of liquid, the video consists mostly of beauty shots from each member until they join each other on a living room with nothing but a couch. The video also featured product placement of a Nikon digital camera, Nikon 1 J2.

James Robertson of Daily Mirror stated that "the accompanying video is as pretty as the title suggests... but our favourite bit has to be the most unsubtle product placement we've ever seen." Some music critics compared the work to the Spice Girls' music video "Headlines (Friendship Never Ends)".

== Live performances ==
Girls Aloud first performed "Beautiful 'Cause You Love Me" on 16 November 2012 at Children in Need 2012. The group also performed the song at Capital FM's Jingle Bell Ball in December 2012. On 14 December 2012, Girls Aloud appeared on BBC Radio 1's Live Lounge, performing a mash-up of the song with a cover of Labrinth and Emeli Sandé's "Beneath Your Beautiful". On 25 December 2012, the group performed the song on Top of the Pops Christmas Special. In 2013, the group performed the song on Ten: The Hits Tour.

== Credits and personnel ==
Recording

- Recorded at Studio Spendido, Wales.
- Strings recorded at Air Edel, London.

Personnel

- Songwriter – Rachel Moulden
- Producer, mixer – Jim Eliot
- Vocal production – Jonathan Shakhovskey, Emily Wright
- Drums, keyboards, synths, bass, programming, FX – Jim Eliot
- Piano – Fred Cox
- Violin – Everton Nelson, Natalia Berner, AJ Dods, Richard George, Sally Herbert
- Viola – Bruce White, Clare Finnimore
- Cello – Ian Burdge, Johnny Byers
- Strings – Sally Herbert

Credits adapted from the liner notes of Ten.

== Charts ==
Chart (2012–13)	Peak position
Ireland (IRMA)	80
Scotland (OCC)	75
UK Singles (OCC)	97

== Release history ==
Region	Date	Format	Label
United Kingdom	17 December 2012	Digital download; Mainstream radio	Polydor
