= Here We Go (Moonbaby song) =

2000 song by Moonbaby

Single by Moonbaby
- B-side: "Kitsch Bitch Kool"
- Released: 14 August 2000
- Genre: Pop rock
- Length: 3:52
- Label: London
- Songwriters: Miranda Cooper; Brian Higgins; Matt Gray
- Producers: Brian Higgins; Xenomania

Music video
- "Here We Go" on YouTube

"Here We Go" is a pop song written by Miranda Cooper, Brian Higgins, and Matt Gray, originally recorded by Cooper under the alias Moonbaby. The song was initially released as Moonbaby's first (and only) single in 2000, later being covered by Lene Nystrøm in 2003 and Girls Aloud in 2004. A version with rewritten lyrics appears as the theme music of the French/Canadian animated television series Totally Spies!.

== Background and composition ==
Miranda Cooper was introduced to British record producer Brian Higgins by Saint Etienne members Bob Stanley and Pete Wiggs in the late 1990s. Cooper began recording music with him under the moniker Xenomania and stating "As soon as he played me some tracks, I thought 'This feels right.'" She and her sister attended boarding school in Canford Magna in Dorset, England. Thanks to a connection with Pete Tong, Cooper and Higgins were able to sign a deal with London Records. Cooper was signed as a solo artist in 2000 under the alias of Moonbaby. A four-track sampler was released, featuring "Here We Go" and three other tracks: "Moonbaby", "Deadlines and Diets" (later recorded by Girls Aloud), and "I'm Thru with Love" (later recorded by former Mis-Teeq member Alesha Dixon).

== Release ==
Moonbaby released "Here We Go" as her debut single on 14 August 2000, with cover art shot by fashion photographer Ellen von Unwerth. The single failed to make the top 75 on the UK Singles Chart. The deal between Xenomania and London Records fell through. Cooper and Higgins, however, went on to write and produce for other artists as Xenomania. "Here We Go" served as the basis for the theme music to the animated television series Totally Spies!. A remix version of the song with a more techno and rock tone and without Moonbaby's vocals was heard in the third through fifth seasons of Totally Spies!. In 2003, Aqua vocalist Lene Nystrøm covered "Here We Go" for her debut solo album Play with Me. Her version was compared to Girls Aloud's "No Good Advice", also produced by Xenomania and co-written by Nystrøm. Girls Aloud themselves covered the song a year later for their second album What Will the Neighbours Say?, which was entirely produced by Xenomania.

== Track listing ==
CD single (Moonbaby / LONCD446)

1. "Here We Go"
2. "Kitsch Bitch Kool"
3. "Here We Go" (Capoeira Twins Golightly Mix)

== Girls Aloud version ==
"Here We Go"

Song by Girls Aloud

from the album What Will The Neighbours Say?
- Released: 29 November 2004
- Recorded: May 2004
- Genre: Pop rock; power pop
- Length: 3:47
- Label: Polydor
- Songwriters: Miranda Cooper; Brian Higgins; Matt Gray
- Producers: Brian Higgins; Xenomania

What Will The Neighbours Say? track listing
- 14 tracks: 1. "The Show"; 2. "Love Machine"; 3. "I'll Stand by You"; 4. "Jump"; 5. "Wake Me Up"; 6. "Deadlines & Diets"; 7. "Big Brother"; 8. "Hear Me Out"; 9. "Graffiti My Soul"; 10. "Real Life"; 11. "Here We Go"; 12. "Thank Me Daddy"; 13. "I Say a Prayer for You"; 14. "100 Different Ways"

"Here We Go" was recorded by British all-female pop group for their second studio album What Will the Neighbours Say? in 2004. Their version was also produced by Brian Higgins and Xenomania.

=== Critical reception ===
A review for Girls Aloud's album described the song as "a relatively filthy '60s romp". John Murphy of musicOMH said the song is "brilliant […] and throws in a chorus that will have everyone's inner child dancing in front of the bathroom mirror singing into a hairbrush." Kitty Empire of The Observer commented that "the catchy chorus […] will keep the people who provide the background music on sports programmes on TV very happy." Coincidentally, the song has been heard in sports highlights television programs.

=== Live performances ===
Girls Aloud first performed "Here We Go" live as part of their MTV special on 30 October 2004. A recording of this performance later appeared on the DVD Girls on Film (2005). The group also performed the track on their 2005 concert tour, the What Will the Neighbours Say...? Tour.

=== Credits and personnel ===
- Mastering: Dick Beetham for 360 Mastering
- Mixing: Tim Powell, Matt Talt
- Production: Brian Higgins, Xenomania
- Songwriting: Miranda Cooper, Brian Higgins, Matt Gray
- Vocals: Girls Aloud
- Published by Warner/Chappell Music and Xenomania Music
