= Tangled Up (Girls Aloud album) =

Studio album by Girls Aloud
- Released: 16 November 2007
- Recorded: April–October 2007
- Studios: London, England; Los Angeles, California
- Genre: Pop
- Length: 47:26
- Labels: Fascination; Polydor
- Producers: Brian Higgins; Xenomania

Girls Aloud chronology
The Sound of Girls Aloud: The Greatest Hits (2006)	Tangled Up (2007)	Out of Control (2008)

Singles from Tangled Up
- 1. "Sexy! No No No..." Released: 31 August 2007; 2. "Call the Shots" Released: 26 November 2007; 3. "Can't Speak French" Released: 17 March 2008

Promotional United Kingdom cover

Tangled Up is the fourth studio album by English-Irish girl group Girls Aloud. It was released through Fascination Records and Polydor Records on 16 November 2007, and was distributed in two physical formats and made available for digital consumption. The album is a pop record that incorporates elements of dance-pop, synth-pop, and various EDM sub-genres produced by long time-collaborators Brian Higgins and production team Xenomania. Marking a more mature approach according to group member Cheryl, the album lyrically delves into themes of love, relationships and femininity, and it was the group's first experimentation with tools such as autotune and vocoder. Production and development began with each member meeting with Higgins to discuss their personal and professional experiences since the release of their third album Chemistry (2005). It was recorded separately from April to October 2007, with the band members earning songwriting credits for two tracks off the album.

Upon its release, Tangled Up was met with widespread acclaim from music critics, who commended the dance-oriented sound, songwriting and fun production; it has been identified by numerous commentators as Girls Aloud and Xenomania's best work. Commercially, it experienced success in the United Kingdom, peaking at number four, and was certified platinum by the British Phonographic Industry (BPI) for shipments of 300,000 units. It performed moderately in Ireland, reaching number 25, and was certified gold by the Irish Recorded Music Association (IRMA) for 7,500 claimed sales.

In order to promote Tangled Up, Girls Aloud conducted a series of promotional activities such as television, commercial and magazine appearances. Three singles were released from the album: "Sexy! No No No...", "Call the Shots" and "Can't Speak French", all achieving critical and commercial success in Europe. Furthermore, the girl group embarked on their Tangled Up Tour, which saw them tour in the UK and the Republic of Ireland. Like the album, it achieved critical and commercial acclaim, and a live DVD was distributed on 27 October 2008.

== Background and development ==
In April 2007, the group announced that they would release a new studio album in November of that year. Initial ideas started in March of that year where each member met with British producer Brian Higgins, who had worked with them together on their previously released albums. Each singer visited Higgins at his home in England and discussed their experiences and life endeavours after the release of Girls Aloud's third studio album Chemistry (2005). To his advantage, he decided to take inspiration from those discussions and work further on the new record, along with his production team Xenomania. Group member Nicola Roberts reaffirmed that it was important for Higgins to be "up to date with where [Girls Aloud are] at," and further commented, "Our songs have to reflect us so that's why we do it." Moreover, when asked in an interview with Fascination Records about what fans and critics could expect from the album, group member Cheryl Cole said they were heading for a "more mature direction." She also believed that the ideal focus for the record was not to sing "about things that we would have when we were 16. Now we're singing about things that you talk about in your early 20s."

In late March 2007, Higgins and Xenomania started crafting demo songs for the girl group to record, which commenced the following month. However, Higgins only provided the demo to member Nadine Coyle to sing to choose which sections of the song will work. Subsequently, she recorded the tracks in Los Angeles once Higgins mastered the final versions. According to member Kimberley Walsh, it took Girls Aloud six months to finish recording the album, which she found "unusual" for the group. Furthermore, she noted that sessions for their previous albums would take a "matter of weeks", but took longer because the members wanted to experiment more with the production. Moreover, recording had to be halted due to the group embarking on The Greatest Hits Tour and promotion of Tangled Up's lead single "Sexy! No No No...". The album was finished in October 2007 and was mastered by Higgins himself, with the help of Dick Beetham of 360 Masterings.

== Composition and themes ==
Unlike the group's previous records, Tangled Up is a pop album that consistently incorporates elements of electropop, dance music, Europop and various EDM sub-genres. Regarding the sound and production, Alexis Petridis of the Guardian found the material to be "witty, diverse and experimental", whilst Digital Spy contributor Nick Levine believed it to be "their most danceable album to date". Tangled Up was the group's first album to not include cover songs or traditional ballads. Group member Nadine Coyle said that the tracks from Tangled Up were "all in the same vein," contrary to their previous releases, of which she described the song selection as "quite random". There are several themes discussed throughout the record, including melancholy, love, relationships, sex and femeninity. Girls Aloud co-wrote two of the twelve tracks on the album: "Sexy! No No No..." and "Crocodile Tears". A leftover track titled "Dog Without A Bone", was originally written in 2006 in an attempt to come up with a lead single for the group's first compilation album, The Sound of Girls Aloud: The Greatest Hits, however, "Something Kinda Ooooh" was released instead. The group also co-wrote and recorded a song titled "Hoxton Heroes", which pokes fun at indie bands. The song was deemed too controversial for Tangled Up and therefore omitted from the album; however, the song was released as a B-side to the third single off the album "Can't Speak French". Cheryl Cole stated that whilst they never intended to enter the industry as "brilliant lyricists", they felt "comfortable with writing bits and pieces".

=== Songs ===
"Call the Shots"
A 22-second sample of the opening track features Girls Aloud singing mature lyrics over a "classy electronic Euro-pop" instrumentation.

"Close to Love"
A 23-second sample of the song's chorus which "kicks off the energetic side of Tangled Up with a monster beat."

The album opens with "Call the Shots", an "elegant" electropop ballad that incorporates elements of 1980s pop and 1990s house, and minor Europop sounds. Additionally, it was described as one of their softer–sounding singles in their career and features a solo bridge section by member Nicola Roberts. Furthermore, Cheryl highlighted it as her favourite track from the album and said it gave her goosebumps. The second track, "Close to Love", was noted by commentators as the "kick-starter" to the album, singling out its "energetic" nature and dance–house music as a factor. During the verses, it features a "part rap, part singing" delivery by member Nadine Coyle. The third track of the album, "Sexy! No No No..."—which was released as the record's lead single—was described as one of their most "daring" single releases. Incorporating instrumentation such as synthesizers, keyboards and vocoder pro-tools for Cheryl's vocals at the first part of the recording, it is an experimental power pop anthem that emphasizes a rock-like sound over-top accompanying electronic music. "Girl Overboard" was singled out as one of the better cuts from the album, with many critics praising its "clubby vibe" and 80s-inspired house and Eurodance music. Moreover, a Matt O'Leary from Virgin Media felt the song was one of the only "melodic" mentions on Tangled Up.

"Can't Speak French", the fifth song on the record, is a "sultry" midtempo number that features electric guitars and synths, similar to what was used during the phase of smooth jazz music. Likewise, "Black Jacks" is another midtempo recording that boasts 1960s-psychedelic music, and was compared to the work of Toni Basil and Sugababes. Another melodic track to Tangled Up, it was selected by some critics as one of the "finest" moments from both the album and Girls Aloud's career. "Black Jacks" was originally recorded for the group's previous studio album Chemistry but left out of the album for unknown reasons. The seventh track, "Control of the Knife", is a reggae and ska-influenced tune that incorporates a variety of trumpets, drum machines and synthesizers. During the song's chorus, an uncredited male singer performs the lines "Got sweet hassle, sweet talking me / Got cheap babble, cheap talking free," through vocoder effects. "Fling" was described by DIY's Stuart McCaighy as a "trademark GA" track, signifying its "beefed-up dancefloor" sound and rap section as examples. Similarly, Nick Levine at Digital Spy noticed that the track saw Girls Aloud on "full vamp-mode".

The ninth song is "What You Crying For", first described by Cheryl as a "garage-sound track". However, critics refuted these comments by defining its sound as drum and bass, with influences of pop and two-step garage. Despite a negative remark by McCaighy, many other music editors highlighted the production as "forward-thinking" and believed the members "excelled themselves". The "futuristic" "I'm Falling" includes "squelchy sounds with a punky guitar", which was later compared to Girls Aloud's track "Graffiti My Soul" by BBC Music's Talia Kraines. "Damn" was one of the only tracks that was not frequently discussed by critics in their reviews for Tangled Up, but the pop rock-number was criticized for not sonically "blending" with the rest of the material. The album closer, "Crocodile Tears", is a mid-tempo pop rock song that focuses more on the members' "intelligent" vocal performances, an element to which was never highlighted in their previous work, as mentioned by AllMusic's John Lucas.

== Release and packaging ==
Tangled Up was first released in Ireland on 16 November 2007, and then throughout Europe on 19 November 2007. It was distributed by Fascination in two physical formats—a standard compact disc and a special jewelcase packaging— and was available for digital consumption through Polydor. The record was issued through the iTunes Store and Amazon Music worldwide the following year by Polydor, and on 7 October 2015, Tangled Up, along with various other musical releases by Girls Aloud, were released in North America. The artwork has the group's name and the album title hung on several long black rods in front of a purple background. The lyrics for each song were not featured in the accompanying booklet. The title of the album, Tangled Up, derives from a sentence of the album track "Close to Love". It is the only Girls Aloud album cover art not to feature the members; it received negative remarks from commentators for its "boring" context and imagery.

A fan edition of Tangled Up was also available through Girls Aloud's official website; the artwork incorporates each of the members holding onto long thick metal wires covered in rubber, while the original photos were placed inside the booklet. Additionally, the CD came with the lyrics and signed postcards. Despite the change, which was positively received, the artwork was noted by critics for its slightly uneven display of member Nicola Roberts, whose photo occupies marginally less space than those of the remaining four members, as described by Fraser McAlphine of BBC Music.

=== Mixed Up ===
In addition to the album, Girls Aloud and Fascination teamed up with Julian Gingell and Barry Stone—under the pseudonym Jewels & Stone—to produce a limited edition remix album. Mixed Up, the group's first and only remix collection, was available to purchase only from British retail store Woolworths and was available at a discounted price when bought together with Tangled Up. The artwork is similar to that of the parent album, but the Girls Aloud text is altered to have a multi-colored font. Despite the collection featuring eight remixed tracks, Mixed Up only features one recording from Tangled Up; this was "Sexy! No No No...", which was edited and remixed by Tony Lamezma, whilst the remaining content comes from the group's previous singles. For digital deluxe editions of Tangled Up, the remix album was condensed down into a 38-long minute track and included as the final appearing number; it was made for an "album only" purchase on digital stores.

Mixed Up: CD only
No.	Title	Writer(s)	Length
1.	"The Show" (Tony Lamezma club mix)	Miranda Cooper; Brian Higgins; Tim Powell; Lisa Cowling; Jon Shave	3:43
2.	"No Good Advice" (Doublefunk clean vocal mix)	Cooper; Higgins; Cowling; Coler; Lene Nystrøm	5:19
3.	"I Think We're Alone Now" (Tony Lamezma Baubletastic remix)	Ritchie Cordell; Tommy James	5:10
4.	"Sexy! No No No..." (Tony Lamezma's "Yes Yes Yes" mix)	Girls Aloud; Cooper; Higgins; Powell; Coler; Cowling; Myra Antonia Boyle; Matthew Del Gray; Carla Marie Williams; Dan McCafferty; Darrell Sweet; Manny Charlton; Pete Agnew	5:53
5.	"Something Kinda Ooooh" (Tony Lamezma remix)	Cooper; Higgins; Powell; Coler; Jody Lei; Giselle Sommerville	4:40
6.	"Wake Me Up" (Tony Lamezma's Love Affair)	Cooper; Higgins; Powell; Cowling; Shawn Lee; Paul Woods; Yusra Maru'e	5:09
7.	"Jump" (Almighty vocal mix)	Steve Mitchell; Marti Sharron; Gary Skardina	4:09
8.	"Biology" (Tony Lamezma remix)	Cooper; Higgins; Cowling; Sommerville	4:23

== Singles ==
The first single from Tangled Up was "Sexy! No No No...", which was released on 3 September 2007. A critical success, the single reached number five on the UK singles chart and number 11 on both the Billboard Euro Digital Songs Chart and Irish Singles Chart. The accompanying music video was directed by Trudy Bellinger and features the group sporting futuristic-looking skintight PVC catsuits with peep-toe high heels as they dance through wires stretched across the set. "Call the Shots", the second single from the album, was released on 26 November. It achieved critical acclaim from critics and was awarded the Popjustice £20 Music Prize, Girls Aloud's fourth win in that category. It was also a commercial success, peaking at number three in the UK and number nine in Ireland. The accompanying music video was directed by Sean de Sparengo, and features the members in purple dresses performing on Malibu Beach at night with flames and white fabric surrounding them. Each member of the band is also shown in other locations, following several story lines. Although they were in discussion, "Control of the Knife" and "Close to Love" were scrapped from being the third single in favour of "Can't Speak French", which was released 17 March 2008. This was during the same time Girls Aloud were working on the material to their fifth studio album Out of Control (2008). Critically and commercially successful, a music video was shot by Petro that features Girls Aloud in elaborate costumes inspired by Marie Antoinette and 18th century French fashions.

== Critical reception ==
Professional ratings
Review scores
Source	Rating
AllMusic	4/5 stars
BBC Music	(positive)
Digital Spy	4/5 stars
DIY	8/10
The Guardian	4/5 stars
The List	5/5 stars
MusicOMH	4/5 stars
NME	7/10
Virgin Media	4.5/5 stars

Upon its release, Tangled Up received universal acclaim from music critics. In an article from The List, Camilla Pia awarded the album a five-star rating, praising the mixture of genres, "witty lyrics, insanely infectious melodies and soaring choruses that explode out of nowhere". However, Pia noted Xenomania's "genius" production and concluded that Tangled Up "is a standout example of some of the best British songwriting in years". Talia Kraines of BBC Music agreed, labelling it another "unrelenting pop masterpiece" by the group, made "without ever losing their sense of fun", while complimenting the "challenging" production. AllMusic writer John Lucas awarded the album four stars, considering it a "short, sharp and tight collection of some of the most exciting music in a particularly exciting career". Lucas also commended the album's maturity and its heavy use of electropop music. Similarly, Matt O'Leary of Virgin Media rated Tangled Up four and a half stars out of five, describing the album as "ballsy pop with moments of eclecticism which [...] results in hair-curlingly exciting music" and enjoyed the group's ability to grow creatively.

Although Alexis Petridis, a contributor to The Guardian, felt that the opening half of Tangled Up was "disappointing", he commended the melodies, songwriting and variety of music elements; for that, he awarded the record four stars. Nick Levine from Digital Spy found the songs to be "fun, frivolous, catchy, sexy and innovative" and called it their most "danceable album to date". John Murphy of MusicOMH examined how Tangled Up proved to show how Girls Aloud had managed to move on creatively since their time on reality TV and commended the album's pop and electronic aspects. He called the album "original, inventive and sometimes exhilarating", and the only aspect of criticism in his review was aimed towards the album cover. A reviewer for NME rated the album 7 out of 10, saying that the group's career "has been marked by genre-hopping," and felt that Tangled Up "will continue the trend". The reviewer also highlighted the songs "Fling" and "Can't Speak French" as "unbeatable future pop hits". Although criticizing the choices of certain songs and member Nadine Coyle's overemphasized vocal deliveries, Stuart McCaighy from DIY awarded it 8 points and commended the production and quality of songs.

Conversely, Tangled Up received mixed opinions by commentators who felt divided by the content and production. Nick Butler from Sputnikmusic gave it two and a half points out of five, labelling it "average". Butler criticized Xenomania's input for making the record sound inconsistent and "wild", whilst also noting that the production overlapped the girl group. Citing the album track "What You Waiting For" as the album's only "tuneful thing here", he went on to conclude it as "Girls Aloud's worst album yet". The Times writer Steve Jelbert awarded the album three stars and gave it a mixed review, calling it as "predictable as a motorway, but fun". Similarly, Dom Passantino at Drowned in Sound awarded it four points out of ten, highlighting the lack of originality and "stupid" themes as core reasons for the rating. He also criticized the "boring" vocal performances and only recommended "Black Jacks" for its "acceptable" quality.

== Commercial performance ==
Commercially, Tangled Up experienced success in the United Kingdom. The record debut at number four and five on the UK Albums Chart and the physical component chart, making it the group's first studio album to enter the top ten since What Will the Neighbours Say? (2004) and their highest record since their debut in 2003. That same week—dated 25 November 2007—it managed to peak one position higher on the downloads chart, their highest peak since its establishment. Tangled Up appeared only once inside the top ten of the album chart, descending to number 12 the following week. The record stayed inside the top 40 for another 17 weeks, tallying it up to 36 appearances. After the release of Girls Aloud's fifth and final studio album, Out of Control (2008), Tangled Up re-entered the top 100 chart at number 79 and spent eight weeks outside the top 70. Then in November 2008, the album re-charted at number 53 while Out of Control was still inside the top 100 and charted for a total of three weeks.

To date, Tangled Up has spent 47 weeks in the UK Albums Chart, making it their longest-charting studio album. It was certified Platinum by the British Phonographic Industry (BPI) for shipments of 300,000 units, and has sold 523,000 copies as of July 2026. In Ireland, Tangled Up experienced moderate success and entered at number 25, their second record after Chemistry (2005) not to enter the top 20. It dropped to number 33 in the following chart, but spent another ten weeks steadily inside the top 60. Nevertheless, Tangled Up was certified Gold by the Irish Recorded Music Association (IRMA) for shipments of 7,500 units. The album entered at number four on the Scottish Albums Chart, and experienced a similar run as on the UK Albums Chart.

== Promotion ==
=== Commercial and televised appearances ===
In order to promote Tangled Up, Girls Aloud conducted a series of promotional activities such as television, commercial and magazine appearances. One of the earlier promotion schedules was an appearance by Nadine Coyle on RTÉ One's Saturday Night with Miriam on 14 July 2007, where she briefly commented on the work of Tangled Up and "Sexy! No No No...". Subsequently, the group began promotion of the album by performing the single at the T4 on the Beach special on 22 July 2007, and sang the track on further TV show specials. In November that year, the band performed their single "Call the Shots" on various charity and television shows, such as UNICEF and The X Factor, and performed a Christmas special for Top of the Pops in December. The following year, Girls Aloud performed "Can't Speak French" on various shows such as the 2008 V Festival.

Through 2007 and 2008, Girls Aloud had also recorded several television specials and shows that promoted themselves and the work from Tangled Up. The group performed and made a cameo appearance in the British teen film St Trinian's; they also provided vocals to the soundtrack, whilst member Sarah Harding made another appearance in its sequel. Furthermore, Girls Aloud released a fashion-inspired DVD titled Get Girls Aloud's Style (2007), which also contained music video commentary up to "Sexy! No No No...". The band hosted a four-part special with ITV2, titled The Passions of Girls Aloud (2008), which showed each member doing activities in different countries. Coyle, who was scheduled to take part, decided to pull out of the project, which courted controversy from fans and commentators.

=== Concert tour ===
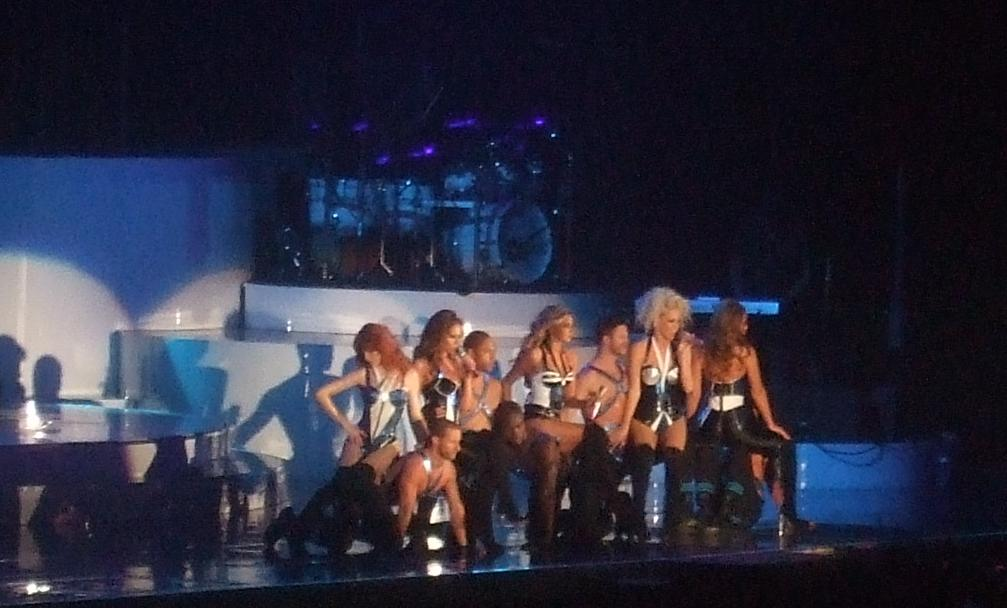
Girls Aloud performing during the Tangled Up Tour, 2008.

To further promote the record, Girls Aloud embarked on the Tangled Up Tour in 2008. Prior to its announcement, several publications had reported a split of the band, after Nadine Coyle withdrew from two reality shows that the group participated in. The show reportedly cost an estimated £3 million to stage, with £250,000 worth of pyrotechnics. The band called the show their most "extravagant and rewarding" tour year, while Sarah Harding said that "over the years it gets bigger and more elaborate". The stage outfits were designed by Welsh designer Julien MacDonald, London-based Norwegian designer Kristian Aadnevik, and Liza Bruce. The tour spanned between May and mid-August 2008 and was recorded on 17 May 2008 at the O2 Arena in London, airing live across 50 Vue cinemas throughout United Kingdom. The recording was released on DVD through Polydor Records on 27 October 2008, and it was later certified Gold by the BPI.

== Cultural impact ==
Tangled Up and its songs have earned several mentions by commentators and critics as the group's best works. In a readers' column at The Guardian, Laurence Green and Patrick Devine openly commended the appeal of the singles "Sexy! No No No..." and "Call the Shots", identifying it amongst the group's best work. On their poll, the former and latter track placed second and third on their "Girls Aloud's finest moments"—behind 2005's "Biology"—, and were the only inclusions that featured more than one single over 10% of the votes from a single studio album. Similarly, an editor at Metro valued both singles as some of their most "daring" and "critically acclaimed" singles, and some of the "best work in the 21st century". "Call the Shots", in particular, has been cited as one of the greatest songs in pop history, as claimed by publications such as AllMusic, Popjustice, amongst others. Furthermore, the single won the Popjustice £20 Music Prize, Girls Aloud's fourth consecutive win in that category, of eight nominations in total. Kathy Iandoli from Billboard cited "Can't Speak French" and "Call the Shots" as the 10th and top underrated tracks by underrated girl groups in North America, stating that the final song was an "incredible" number". Andy Kellman of AllMusic highlighted Tangled Up as one of their best albums, the others being What Will The Neighbours Say? (2004) and The Sound of Girls Aloud (2006); while an editor at Capital FM labelled it one of the best releases in their career.

The success of Tangled Up brought several nominations and accolades to Girls Aloud. In 2007, the group were nominated for five categories, eventually winning Album of the Year, Video of the Year for "Sexy! No No No..." and an individual record for member Cheryl. The group were also nominated at the 2008 Brit Awards for Best Group, which was the group's first nomination since 2005 in that category, and were recognized by the Capital FM Awards as the favorite London-based group, and by the News of the World Fabulous award. Glamour magazine voted them the best band in the UK, marking their second consecutive accolade. In 2009, Tangled Up won the Best Live Album of the Year award at the Music Producers Guild Awards, their first and only win from the organization.

== Track listing ==
All tracks were produced by Brian Higgins and Xenomania. Credits adapted from the liner notes.

Standard edition
No.	Title	Writer(s)	Length
1.	"Call the Shots"	Miranda Cooper; Brian Higgins; Tim Powell; Giselle Sommerville; Lisa Cowling	3:45
2.	"Close to Love"	Cooper; Higgins; Powell; Cowling; Nick Coler; Jody Lei	3:53
3.	"Sexy! No No No..."	Girls Aloud; Cooper; Higgins; Powell; Coler; Cowling; Myra Antonia Boyle; Matthew Del Gray; Carla Marie Williams; Dan McCafferty; Darrell Sweet; Manny Charlton; Pete Agnew	3:18
4.	"Girl Overboard"	Cooper; Higgins; Powell; Coler; Lei	4:11
5.	"Can't Speak French"	Cooper; Higgins; Powell; Coler; Lei; Williams	4:04
6.	"Black Jacks"	Cooper; Higgins; Powell; Coler; Cowling	4:20
7.	"Control of the Knife"	Cooper; Higgins; Sommerville; Jon Shave	3:51
8.	"Fling"	Cooper; Higgins; Powell; Coler; Williams; Moguai	4:13
9.	"What You Crying For"	Cooper; Higgins; Cowling; Tim "Rolf" Larcombe; Boyle	3:44
10.	"I'm Falling"	Cooper; Higgins; Powell; Yusra Maru'e; Niara Scarlett	4:01
11.	"Damn"	Cooper; Higgins; Powell; Coler; Cowling	3:46
12.	"Crocodile Tears"	Girls Aloud; Cooper; Higgins; Powell; Coler; Sommerville; Larcombe	4:18
Total length:			47:26

Digital deluxe edition bonus track
No.	Title	Length
13.	"Mixed-Up (Note: "Mixed-Up" comprises "The Show" (Tony Lamezma Club Mix), "No Good Advice" (Doublefunk Clean Vocal Mix), "I Think We're Alone Now" (Tony Lamezma's Baubletastic Remix), "Sexy! No No No..." (Tony Lamezma's "Yes Yes Yes" Remix), "Something Kinda Ooooh" (Tube City Remix), "Wake Me Up" (Tony Lamezma's "Love Affair"), "Jump" (Almighty Vocal Mix) and "Biology" (Tony Lamezma Remix).)"	38:22

Special Deluxe 3CD edition – disc 2
No.	Title	Writer(s)	Length
1.	"What's a Girl to Do"	Cooper; Higgins; Powell; Cowling; Boyle	3:58
2.	"My Heart"	Cooper; Higgins; Powell; Cowling; Coler	3:07
3.	"Dog Without a Bone"	Cooper; Higgins; Sommerville	4:00
4.	"Blow Your Cover"	Cooper; Higgins; Cowling; Lei; Girls Aloud	3:27
5.	"Hoxton Heroes"	Girls Aloud; Higgins	3:01
6.	"Walk This Way vs Sugababes"	Tyler; Perry	2:55
7.	"Theme to St. Trinian's"	Mole; Thomson; Higgins	4:29
8.	"On My Way to Satisfaction"	Cooper; Higgins; Powell; Marue; Scarlett	4:05
9.	"Je Ne Parle Pas Français (Note: French version of "Can't Speak French")"	Cooper; Higgins; Powell; Coler; Lei; Williams	3:41
10.	"Sexy! No No No..." (alternative version)	Girls Aloud; Cooper; Higgins; Powell; Coler; Cowling; Boyle; Del Gray; Williams; McCafferty; Sweet; Charlton; Agnew	3:32
11.	"Girl Overboard" (alternative version)	Cooper; Higgins; Powell; Coler; Lei	3:54
12.	"Close To Love" (alternative version)	Cooper; Higgins; Powell; Cowling; Coler; Lei	3:05
13.	"Sexy! No No No..." (development track)	Girls Aloud; Cooper; Higgins; Powell; Coler; Cowling; Boyle; Del Gray; Williams; McCafferty; Sweet; Charlton; Agnew	2:28
14.	"Can't Speak French" (radio edit)	Cooper; Higgins; Powell; Coler; Lei; Williams	3:19
15.	"Something Kinda Ooooh" (live at Bournemouth)	Cooper; Higgins; Powell; Coler; Lei; Sommerville	3:24
16.	"Rehab" (Radio 1 live lounge)	Winehouse	3:44
17.	"With Every Heartbeat" (Radio 1 live lounge)	Carlsson; Kleerup	4:01

Special Deluxe 3CD edition – disc 3
No.	Title	Writer(s)	Length
1.	"Sexy! No No No..." (Tony Lamezma's 'Yes Yes Yes' radio edit)	Girls Aloud; Cooper; Higgins; Powell; Coler; Cowling; Boyle; Del Gray; Williams; McCafferty; Sweet; Charlton; Agnew	4:09
2.	"Call The Shots" (Tony Lamezma's radio edit)	Cooper; Higgins; Powell; Sommerville; Cowling	3:29
3.	"Can't Speak French" (Tony Lamezma's radio edit)	Cooper; Higgins; Powell; Coler; Lei; Williams	3:59
4.	"Sexy! No No No..." (Xenomania club mix)	Girls Aloud; Cooper; Higgins; Powell; Coler; Cowling; Boyle; Del Gray; Williams; McCafferty; Sweet; Charlton; Agnew	4:58
5.	"Call The Shots" (Xenomania club mix)	Cooper; Higgins; Powell; Sommerville; Cowling	4:45
6.	"Can't Speak French" (Tony Lamezma's Passion remix)	Cooper; Higgins; Powell; Coler; Lei; Williams	6:05
7.	"Walk This Way" (Yoad mix)	Tyler; Perry	3:02
8.	"Sexy! No No No..." (Tony Lamezma's 'Yes Yes Yes' mix)	Girls Aloud; Cooper; Higgins; Powell; Coler; Cowling; Boyle; Del Gray; Williams; McCafferty; Sweet; Charlton; Agnew	6:14
9.	"Call The Shots" (Tony Lamezma's Sniper mix)	Cooper; Higgins; Powell; Sommerville; Cowling	7:22
10.	"Sexy! No No No..." (Flip & Fill remix)	Girls Aloud; Cooper; Higgins; Powell; Coler; Cowling; Boyle; Del Gray; Williams; McCafferty; Sweet; Charlton; Agnew	6:05
11.	"Call The Shots" (Alex K mix)	Cooper; Higgins; Powell; Sommerville; Cowling	5:08

== Personnel ==
Credits adapted from the liner notes of Tangled Up.

Recording

- Recorded in London, United Kingdom by members Cheryl, Sarah Harding, Nicola Roberts and Kimberley Walsh. Recorded in Los Angeles, California by member Nadine Coyle.

Music credits

- Cheryl Cole (credited under her full name) – vocals, songwriting
- Nadine Coyle – vocals, songwriting
- Sarah Harding – vocals, songwriting
- Nicola Roberts – vocals, songwriting
- Kimberley Walsh – vocals, songwriting
- Owen Parker – guitar
- Xenomania – production, composing, songwriting
- Brian Higgins – songwriting, production, composing, programming, mixing
- Matt Gray – songwriting, composing, programming
- Miranda Cooper – songwriting, composing, programming
- Tim Powell – songwriting, composing, programming, mixing
- Toby Scott – songwriting, composing, programming
- Jeremy Wheatley – mixing
- Giselle Sommerville – songwriting
- Lisa Cowling – songwriting
- Dan Aslet – guitar
- Nick Coler – guitar, keyboards, programming
- Jody Lei – songwriting
- Nazareth – songwriting
- Jon Shave – keyboards, programming
- Andre Tegelen – keyboards, programming
- Michael Bellina – keyboards, programming
- Moguai – songwriting
- Tim Larcombe – songwriting
- Myra Boyle – songwriting
- Yusra Maru'e – songwriting
- Niara Scarlett – songwriting

== Charts ==
=== Weekly charts ===
Chart (2007–08)	Peak position
Irish Albums (IRMA)	25
Scottish Albums (Official Charts)	4
UK Albums (Official Charts)	4

=== Year-end charts ===
Chart (2007)	Position
UK Albums (OCC)	62
Chart (2008)	Position
UK Albums (OCC)	71

== Certifications ==
Region	Certification	Certified units/sales
Ireland (IRMA)	Gold	7,500^{^}
United Kingdom (BPI)	Platinum	523,000
^{^} Shipments figures based on certification alone.

== Release history ==
Region	Date	Format	Label
Ireland	16 November 2007	CD	Fascination
United Kingdom	16 November 2007	Limited edition CD	Fascination
United Kingdom	19 November 2007	CD	Fascination
United Kingdom	19 November 2007	digital download	Fascination
Australia	2008	digital download	Polydor
New Zealand	2008	digital download	Polydor
Ireland	2008	digital download	Polydor
Germany	2008	digital download	Polydor
France	2008	digital download	Polydor
Spain	2008	digital download	Polydor
Japan	2008	digital download	Polydor
Taiwan	2008	digital download	Polydor
United States	7 October 2015	digital download	Polydor
Canada	7 October 2015	digital download	Polydor
