= List of Girls Aloud concert tours =

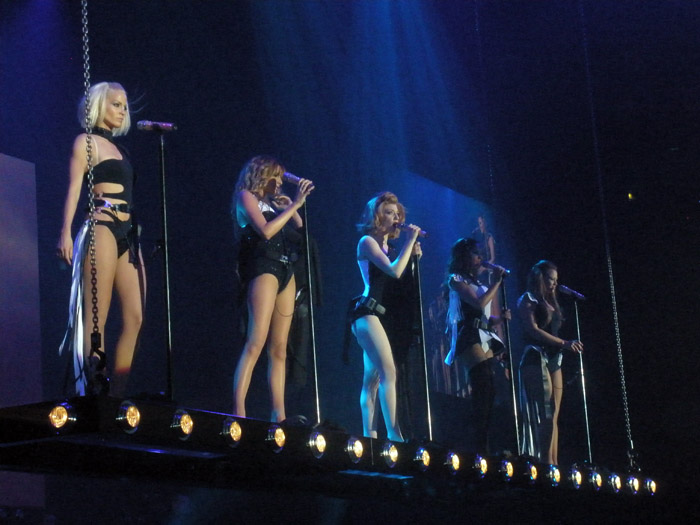
Girls Aloud (L-R: Sarah Harding, Nadine Coyle, Nicola Roberts, Cheryl Cole, and Kimberley Walsh) performing in Manchester in April 2009, as a part of their Out of Control Tour.

British-Irish girl group Girls Aloud have embarked on seven concert tours of the United Kingdom and Ireland, six of which were in arena-sized venues.

The group initially planned to embark on a Popstars: The Rivals tour in March 2003, alongside their fellow winners One True Voice as well as other contestants. However, the tour was cancelled due to poor ticket sales. Girls Aloud's manager Louis Walsh said the group would tour by themselves later that year; however, these plans never came into fruition. In 2004, dates for Girls Aloud's first tour were announced. The What Will the Neighbours Say...? Tour reached twenty theatres over the course of twenty two shows. In 2006, Girls Aloud embarked on their second tour, performing in ten arenas across the United Kingdom. The Chemistry Tour is the group's shortest tour and their only not to reach the island of Ireland. Kimberley Walsh described the show as "bigger and better." The introduction depicts Girls Aloud as five women created by a mad scientist, referencing their reality show beginnings. The stage included a catwalk which extended into the audience. The tour received widespread acclaim from contemporary music critics who complimented the show's relentless fun. In support of their first greatest hits, Girls Aloud embarked on The Greatest Hits Tour in 2007. The show, dubbed the group's "raunchiest tour ever", received favorable reviews but was chastised for the number of covers performed.

2008's Tangled Up Tour saw Girls Aloud embark on their longest tour yet. The show reportedly cost an estimated £3 million to stage, with £250,000 worth of pyrotechnics. The stage outfits were designed by Welsh designer Julien MacDonald. For the opening number, the girls were suspended from the ceiling wearing black cloaks. They also performed a stripped-down ballad section on a catwalk in the middle of the arena. Many reviews focused on Girls Aloud's provocative attire, comparing it to Madonna's Erotica era. The tour was mostly praised by critics, who noted that "Girls Aloud remain confidently the only pop show in town" and they "pulled out all the stops." Girls Aloud also performed a number of open-air concerts over the summer. The Out of Control Tour was announced for 2009. Initially, just ten tour dates in bigger arenas across the United Kingdom and Ireland were announced. Due to arenas selling out, Girls Aloud had to add a number of live shows to the tour. They also learned a pole-dancing routine. The sell-out tour earned millions in gross revenue.

An arena tour in 2024 featuring the four remaining members of the group commenced.

Girls Aloud have performed at London gay nightclub G-A-Y multiple times to promote the singles "The Show", "Life Got Cold", "Wake Me Up", and "Long Hot Summer". They also performed at the venue to launch the release of their albums Sound of the Underground, What Will the Neighbours Say?, Chemistry, and Tangled Up. The group have also performed at a number of festivals, including Big Gay Out in 2005 and V Festival in 2006 and 2008. Girls Aloud also supported Coldplay alongside Jay-Z at Wembley Stadium for two consecutive nights in September 2009.

== Concert tours ==
List of concert tours
Year	Title	Duration	Shows
2005	What Will the Neighbours Say...? Tour	4 May 2005 – 2 June 2005	22
It promoted their first two albums, Sound of the Underground and What Will the Neighbours Say?. The tour reached theatres across the United Kingdom and Ireland. Seventeen tour dates were initially announced by various news sources in December 2004. Extra shows were added at the Manchester Apollo and London's Hammersmith Apollo respectively, due to the high demand. Girls Aloud performed all of their singles to date in addition to album tracks and a cover of Wheatus' "Teenage Dirtbag". The show was released on DVD in November 2005 In a review of the DVD, MusicOMH stated "this features all that you'd ever want from a pop concert [...] almost every song is a cracker."
2006	Chemistry: The Tour	22 May 2006 – 3 June 2006	10
The tour was announced towards the end of October 2005. Performing just ten dates across Great Britain, the tour ranks as their shortest. The group did not tour in Ireland due to low record sales. Kimberley Walsh said the tour would be "bigger and better" than the last tour, due to the size of the venues. The stage included a catwalk which extended into the audience. The tour begins with an introduction "evokes memories of Weird Science", as a mad scientist creates five women. The introduction was seen as a reference to Girls Aloud's reality show beginnings. Girls Aloud performed a cover of Kaiser Chiefs' "I Predict a Riot" and a medley of songs from 1980s musicals. The tour received widespread critical acclaim who complimented the show's relentless fun. Laura Lee Davies of The Times praised the show, calling it "a thrilling hour and a half of skinny pants, fireworks and dry ice." Sophie Heawood of The Guardian gave the concert four stars out of five. Heawood lauded the group's energy, vocals, and the show's "Broadway feel". A DVD of the concert, titled Girls Aloud: The Greatest Hits Live from Wembley Arena, was released on 13 November 2006 to coincide with the release of Girls Aloud's greatest hits The Sound of Girls Aloud.
2007	The Greatest Hits Tour	14 May 2007 – 2 June 2007	16
In support of their first greatest hits album The Sound of Girls Aloud. Girls Aloud performed all of their singles at the time, with the exception of their Dee C. Lee cover "See the Day", as well as album tracks like "Graffiti My Soul", "Real Life" and "Money". The group also performed a medley consisting of songs from the film Dirty Dancing. Girls Aloud's provocative attire received attention. Dave Simpson of The Guardian gave the show three stars out of five. He chastised the covers, saying Girls Aloud "fare best when they are playing their own songs." Lisa Verrico of The Times also awarded the concert three stars out of five and shared a similar point of view to Simpson. She wrote, "The band's smartest, sassiest, least conventional songs struggled to ignite the Newcastle crowd, while tacky covers and tawdry ballads went down a storm." Verrico also felt "big idea after big idea was let down by its budget." The show is Girls Aloud's only tour not to receive a video release.
2008	Tangled Up Tour	3 May 2008 – 29 August 2008	35
The first dates were announced by various news sources towards the end of November 2007. Initially, there was one date per venue, but the demand caused extra tour dates to be scheduled. In addition to twenty-four arena dates, Girls Aloud also performed eleven open-air concerts over the summer. The show reportedly cost an estimated £3 million to stage, with £250,000 worth of pyrotechnics. The stage outfits were designed by Welsh designer Julien MacDonald. For the opening number, the girls were suspended from the ceiling wearing black cloaks. They also performed a stripped-down ballad section on a catwalk in the middle of the arena. Many reviews focused on Girls Aloud's provocative attire, comparing it to Madonna's Erotica era. The Mirror called it "the most sexually-charged performance of their career". The Independent gave the show four stars, saying that "even their between-song chatter is amusing". Although low points were noted, the review continued that "Girls Aloud remain confidently the only pop show in town." The Daily Record said they "pulled out all the stops." However, The Times said "the famous five could easily have been interchangeable Stepford androids." The tour was recorded on 17 May at the O2 Arena and shown live across 50 Vue cinemas up and down the country. A DVD was released on 27 October 2008, followed by a Blu-ray release on 24 November 2008.
2009	Out of Control Tour	24 April 2009 – 6 June 2009	32
In support of their fifth studio album Out of Control. Initially, just ten tour dates in bigger arenas across the United Kingdom and Ireland were announced. Due to arenas selling out, Girls Aloud had to add a number of live shows to the tour. The show opened with Girls Aloud stood on podiums which rose from underneath the stage and into the air. They also learned a pole-dancing routine. They performed covers of James Morrison's "Broken Strings" and Britney Spears' "Womanizer". The sell-out tour earned millions in gross revenue. It was released on DVD and Blu-ray in October 2009.
2013	Ten: The Hits Tour	21 February 2013 – 20 March 2013	20
In support of their second greatest hits album, Ten. The tour was the group's first tour in four years, and their first tour since they returned from a three-year hiatus (2009–12). Initially, only 14 dates were announced for the tour, but due to high demand, 6 extra dates were added.
2024	The Girls Aloud Show	17 May 2024 – 30 June 2024	30
The seventh concert tour by Girls Aloud, performing 30 shows across Ireland and the United Kingdom. It marked their first tour since 2013 and their first as a quartet following the death of member Sarah Harding in 2021. Described by the group as a "celebration of Sarah, our music and our incredible fans," the tour commenced in Dublin and concluded in Liverpool. It was the biggest UK arena tour of 2024, playing to over 300,000 people. The tour received positive critical reviews. A concert special filmed at The O2 Arena aired on ITV1 in November 2024. Physical releases (Blu-ray/DVD/CD) are scheduled for 13 June 2025.

== Concerts ==
List of concerts
Year	Title	Date
2007	Live at the Local	31 October 2007
In 2007, Girls Aloud performed a live set for Birmingham radio station BRMB's Live at the Local series. The intimate show included a live band accompanying the group with stripped down, mostly acoustic arrangements of Girls Aloud's songs. Girls Aloud performed "Something Kinda Ooooh", "Can't Speak French", "Whole Lotta History", "I'll Stand by You", "Love Machine", "Sexy! No No No...", "Sound of the Underground", "Call the Shots", and "Biology".
2008	The Girls Aloud Party	13 December 2008
A Christmas variety show, produced for ITV. Girls Aloud performed some of their biggest hits, as well as some tracks from their latest album, Out of Control. James Morrison performed his track "Broken Strings" with Girls Aloud, while Kaiser Chiefs led into "Sound of the Underground" with their own track, "Never Miss a Beat". Along with performing, Girls Aloud starred in comedy skits. The show attracted 8.1million viewers to ITV.
2009	Viva la Vida Tour	18 September 2009 & 19 September 2009
In September 2009, Girls Aloud performed two consecutive nights at London's Wembley Stadium as an opening act for Coldplay alongside Jay-Z and White Lies. They performed eight of their biggest singles – "Sound of the Underground", "Biology", "Untouchable", "Love Machine", "I'll Stand by You", "Something Kinda Ooooh", "Call the Shots", and "The Promise" – and a cover of Robyn's "With Every Heartbeat".
