= Graffiti My Soul =

Song by Girls Aloud

from the album What Will The Neighbours Say?
- Released: 29 November 2004
- Recorded: April 2004
- Genre: Avant-pop; hard rock
- Length: 3:14
- Label: Polydor
- Songwriters: Miranda Cooper; Brian Higgins; Lisa Cowling; Tim Powell; Peplab
- Producers: Brian Higgins; Xenomania

What Will The Neighbours Say? track listing
- 14 tracks: 1. "The Show"; 2. "Love Machine"; 3. "I'll Stand by You"; 4. "Jump"; 5. "Wake Me Up"; 6. "Deadlines & Diets"; 7. "Big Brother"; 8. "Hear Me Out"; 9. "Graffiti My Soul"; 10. "Real Life"; 11. "Here We Go"; 12. "Thank Me Daddy"; 13. "I Say a Prayer for You"; 14. "100 Different Ways"

"Graffiti My Soul" is a song by British-Irish all-female pop group Girls Aloud, taken from their second studio album What Will the Neighbours Say? (2004). Written and produced by Brian Higgins and his production team Xenomania, the track was originally written for Britney Spears. "Graffiti My Soul" includes a sample of Peplab's "It's Not the Drug."

Receiving comparisons to Madonna and The Prodigy, "Graffiti My Soul" was lauded by contemporary music critics who praised its innovation. It was expected to be the fifth and final single from What Will the Neighbours Say?, but was canceled so Girls Aloud could begin recording their third album Chemistry.

== Background and composition ==
"Graffiti My Soul" was originally written for Britney Spears in sessions for her fourth studio album In the Zone (2003). Brian Higgins told The Observer in 2004 that Spears' record company Jive Records loved "Graffiti My Soul," but Spears' people felt that the song needed more of a chorus. Higgins said that they wanted "essentially Sound of the Underground 2." Group member Cheryl described Spears' version as "strange," adding that it was not fully mixed. She said that Spears sang it in "that really strange voice and it freaked me out."

The song contains a sample of Dutch musician Peplab's 2001 track "It's Not the Drug." According to a post on his website, Higgins visited Amsterdam and asked permission to sample the main guitar riff of "It's Not the Drug" for Girls Aloud.

The track begins with Nadine Coyle delivering the line "Spiked heels and skintight jeans, I've got a fist full of love that's coming your way, baby," before introducing the guitar riff sampled from Peplab. "Graffiti My Soul" includes stuttered rapping and spoken verses. The song avoids the typical AABA form and verse-chorus form present in most contemporary pop music.

== Release ==
"Graffiti My Soul" was originally intended to be the fifth and final single from What Will the Neighbours Say?, coinciding with the What Will the Neighbours Say...? Tour, but it was canceled so that Girls Aloud could focus on recording their third studio album Chemistry (2005). In January 2008, Cheryl stated that if there was an album track she would have like to release as a single, it would be "Graffiti My Soul".

In 2012, Girls Aloud fans selected "Graffiti My Soul" to be one of ten songs included on the deluxe edition bonus disc of their greatest hits collection Ten. The song has been performed on three of Girls Aloud's concert tours, 2005's What Will the Neighbours Say...? Tour, 2007's The Greatest Hits Tour and 2024's The Girls Aloud Show.

== Reception ==
The Observer described "Graffiti My Soul" as a standout track on Girls Aloud's album, describing it as "a full-scale collision between Madonna, Michael Jackson and the Prodigy". The Guardian, the sister publication of The Observer, also said the song makes you question: "What if the Prodigy hadn't turned down the chance to write with Madonna?" Yahoo! Music called the song "frighteningly sharp and sassy."

Matt Helders, the drummer of indie rock band Arctic Monkeys, praised the song: "Their songs do really musical, clever things; the stutter-rapping in Graffiti My Soul… They're unbeatable."

== Credits and personnel ==
- Guitar: Nick Coler, Shawn Lee
- Keyboards and programming: Brian Higgins
- Mastering: Dick Beetham for 360 Mastering
- Production: Brian Higgins, Xenomania
- Programming: Brian Higgins, Tim Powell, Nick Coler
- Songwriting: Miranda Cooper, Brian Higgins, Lisa Cowling, Peplab, Tim Powell
- Vocals: Girls Aloud
- Published by Warner/Chappell Music, Xenomania Music, Music AllStars and Last Dodo Music
- Contains sample of "It's Not the Drug" by Peplab, licensed from Proudly Recording
