= Girls on Film (video) =

Video by Girls Aloud
- Released: 13 June 2005
- Recorded: 2003–2005
- Genre: Pop
- Length: 102 mins
- Label: Polydor

Girls Aloud chronology
Girls on Film (2005)	What Will the Neighbours Say? Live in Concert (2005)

Girls on Film is the first music video compilation by Girls Aloud, released in 2005 on DVD. The collection contained all of their music videos at the time of release, and was named after Duran Duran's song "Girls on Film" which was covered by Girls Aloud. The DVD included some of their most memorable television performances, and footage from their MTV special Girls Aloud - The Show that aired on MTV Hits on 30 October 2004. There is also behind-the-scenes footage, a Q&A fan session, a double-sided poster and a Christmas television advertisement starring the girls.

== Track listing ==
#	Title
1.	"The Show" [MTV Special]
2.	"Love Machine" [MTV Special]
3.	"Here We Go" [MTV Special]
4.	"Sound of the Underground" [MTV Special]
5.	"I'll Stand By You" [MTV Special]
6.	"Jump" [MTV Special]
7.	"Q&A Fan Session" [MTV Special]
8.	"Sound of the Underground" [Music Video]
9.	"No Good Advice" [Music Video]
10.	"Life Got Cold" [Music Video]
11.	"The Show" [Music Video]
12.	"Love Machine" [Music Video]
13.	"Jump" [Music Video]
14.	"I'll Stand By You" [Music Video]
15.	"Wake Me Up" [Music Video]
16.	"No Good Advice" [Behind The Scenes]
17.	"Love Machine" [Behind The Scenes]
18.	"I'll Stand By You" [Behind The Scenes - Hit 40 UK]
19.	"The Show" [Behind The Scenes]
20.	"Outdoor Adventure" CD:UK film piece
21.	"No Good Advice" CD:UK performance
22.	"Life Got Cold" Popworld performance
23.	"Mars Attack" Top of the Pops Saturday performance
24.	"Wake Me Up" Top of the Pops performance
25.	"Love Machine" Top of the Pops performance
26.	Christmas TV ad Easter Egg

== Chart ==
Chart (2005)	Peak Position
UK Music DVD Chart	5
