= What Will the Neighbours Say? =

2004 studio album by Girls Aloud

Studio album by Girls Aloud
- Released: 29 November 2004
- Recorded: April–September 2004
- Studios: London, England
- Genres: Dance-pop; power pop
- Length: 51:15
- Label: Polydor
- Producers: Brian Higgins; Xenomania

Girls Aloud chronology
Sound of the Underground (2003)	What Will the Neighbours Say? (2004)	Chemistry (2005)

Singles from What Will the Neighbours Say?
- 1. "The Show" Released: 28 June 2004; 2. "Love Machine" Released: 13 September 2004; 3. "I'll Stand by You" Released: 15 November 2004; 4. "Wake Me Up" Released: 21 February 2005

What Will the Neighbours Say? is the second studio album by English-Irish girl group Girls Aloud, released by Polydor Records on 29 November 2004. Following concerns at the label over sales of their debut album, Sound of the Underground (2003), Polydor commissioned Brian Higgins and his production team Xenomania to produce its follow-up in its entirety. Recording took place at Xenomania's studio in Kent, with all five group members contributing to the songwriting.

Musically, the album combines electronic dance production with rock-influenced guitars, drawing on synth-pop, house, disco and rockabilly alongside more conventional pop ballads. The singles "The Show", "Love Machine", and "Wake Me Up" reached the top five in the United Kingdom, while the Children in Need charity single "I'll Stand by You" became the group's second UK number one single. The album also includes their earlier hit "Jump". Girls Aloud supported the release with their first headlining tour in 2005.

What Will the Neighbours Say? received generally favourable reviews for its inventive production, although its cover versions attracted criticism. It debuted at number six on the UK Albums Chart and was certified double platinum in the UK and Ireland. A twentieth-anniversary reissue followed in March 2024, adding previously unreleased recordings and remixes and making the album available on vinyl for the first time.

== Background ==
Following the release of Girls Aloud's debut album, Sound of the Underground (2003), Polydor considered whether to commission a second album after sales fell below the label's expectations. Marketing executives Peter Loraine and Poppy Stanton advocated for the group, while head of A&R Colin Barlow credited the success of "Jump" with strengthening their position. Barlow subsequently asked Brian Higgins and Xenomania to produce the second album in its entirety, following their production of nine tracks across Sound of the Underground and its reissue, including four singles. "When the second album came round, the label said, 'Listen, we're not going to do this group any more if you don't do it.'" Higgins explained.

== Recording ==
Recording sessions took place at Xenomania's base, an English country house in Kent. Nadine Coyle recalled working separately from the other members, sometimes recording with Higgins until early morning; Higgins said that Coyle's vocal abilities enabled the team to test more adventurous material. According to Nicola Roberts, the group recorded songs in separate sections and multiple keys, hearing the complete tracks only after production was finished. If songwriter Miranda Cooper recorded a demo, the group were asked to "copy every small inflection, where she stopped the note, where she took her breath.".

Higgins said, "The pressure to come up with singles was, as always, immense. But [...] we were able to have a lot of fun working on ideas that were maybe a little too odd to be on the radio." The album was recorded from April to September 2004, although its lead single "The Show" was released in June 2004. The album title comes from a lyric in the song "Love Machine" which asks, "what will the neighbours say this time?"

== Music and lyrics ==
What Will the Neighbours Say? combines electronic production with guitar-based arrangements. The backing track to "Love Machine", composed by musicians Tim Powell and Nick Coler, was inspired by the Smiths, while "Wake Me Up" includes a guitar riff inspired by garage rock. What Will the Neighbours Say? also includes a number of ballads.

The lyrics focus on a number of more adult topics, often dealing with sexuality, as well as themes of teenage rebellion and heartbreak. The lyrics to "The Show" contain an anti-promiscuity message, while "Deadlines and Diets" is about one night stands. "Wake Me Up" faced a slight controversy due to its "boozy lyrics." The song references "Bud" and margaritas in the first verse. Unlike Sound of the Underground, Girls Aloud became involved in the writing process. "We don't let them out of the room till they've given every ounce of melodic instinct that they've got in them, [...] at the end, you find they've contributed really well," Higgins stated in an interview with The Observer. Coyle admitted, "I needed to be pushed into songwriting, because I wasn't really interested". The album's lyrics were praised by critics; Alexis Petridis noted that "the girls are usually singing something interesting. Someone at Xenomania has a knack for writing witty couplets". Roberts described Miranda Cooper's lyrics as "the constant thread".

== Songs ==
The album begins with its lead single, "The Show", described as "a feisty, thumping track with a positively rude bassline" and a "rush of thrilling synth stabs and natty vocal hooks". It was also compared to 1990s rave music. "Love Machine", the second single, follows. Petridis called the song a "perfect example of Xenomania's uniquely rousing approach to pop." It blends rockabilly-style guitar with 1980s synth-pop. A cover of the Pretenders' "I'll Stand by You" was recorded especially for Children in Need. Higgins scrapped a "weird, modernist breakbeat version" in favor of a more faithful cover to better suit Children in Need. It was compared to Shakespears Sister. "Jump" is a cover of the Pointer Sisters. The album's fifth track is "Wake Me Up", described as a "garage rock riff [...] over a banging house beat and Blue Monday-ish electronic bass line".

"Deadlines and Diets", originally recorded by songwriter Cooper under the alias Moonbaby, received comparisons to All Saints, particularly their song "Never Ever". "Big Brother", co-written by Cheryl Cole, was labelled "crunchy electro." It was noted that the song "could be about anything, up to and including the admittedly unlikely topic of sexual subservience to a totalitarian dictator." The "voyeur-themed" song was compared to ABBA, New Order and the Thompson Twins by one reviewer. "Hear Me Out" was co-written by Sarah Harding. The ballad received comparisons to those of the Spice Girls. One of the album's most noteworthy songs, "Graffiti My Soul", was intended for Britney Spears's In the Zone (2003). It was turned down for its lack of a chorus; Higgins said that they wanted "essentially "Sound of the Underground 2". The track was described as "a full-scale collision between Madonna, Michael Jackson and the Prodigy" and "frighteningly sharp and sassy." The Guardian said the song makes you question: "What if the Prodigy hadn't turned down the chance to write with Madonna?" "Real Life", the album's tenth track, "unexpectedly evokes Martina Topley-Bird's Tricky tracks."

"Here We Go" was previously recorded by Moonbaby in 2000 and Aqua singer Lene Nystrøm Rasted in 2003 and is the basis for the theme music of the animated television series Totally Spies!. The track has been described as "a relatively filthy '60s romp". "Thank Me Daddy", co-written by Kimberley Walsh, is a "saucy" disco song. "I Say a Prayer for You", a bonus track co-written and entirely sung by Roberts, also received comparisons to Spice Girls' ballads. The album's final track is "100 Different Ways", which Coyle co-wrote and sings solo.

== Release and promotion ==
What Will the Neighbours Say? was released in the United Kingdom on 29 November 2004. The international versions of the album exclude the bonus tracks "I Say a Prayer for You" and "100 Different Ways". What Will the Neighbours Say? and other Girls Aloud releases appeared on the US iTunes Store on 26 June 2007. For its twentieth anniversary, What Will the Neighbours Say? was reissued in March 2024 in three formats: a sky-blue vinyl LP, a picture disc vinyl LP, and a three-CD deluxe edition, as well as a digital download and on streaming. The non-vinyl editions feature the original UK album along with remixes, alternative cuts, rarities, and three previously unreleased tracks: a cover of Chris Isaak's "Wicked Game" originally slated for a shelved 2005 reissue of the album, the original song "Disco Bunny", and a cover of British pop duo Mania's "Baby When You Go."

=== Artwork and packaging ===
Polydor enlisted design agency Form to develop the visual identity for What Will the Neighbours Say? and its accompanying singles. The campaign sought to increase recognition of the individual members as well as the group. Form's art director Paul West drew on cinematic references, including Attack of the 50 Foot Woman (1958), Faster, Pussycat! Kill! Kill! (1965), Modesty Blaise (1966) and Charlie's Angels (2000), alongside the cover of Madness's One Step Beyond... (1979); West described the intended portrayal as "women in control". The agency developed sleeves resembling film posters, featuring the members' names as starring credits and adapting cinema-related symbols, including Dolby and content rating logos, into Girls Aloud branding.

Form designed a bespoke logo for each track title, combining these with abstract promotional imagery and cut-out photographs of the members in the CD's fold-out booklet. The album packaging brought together visual elements developed throughout the singles campaign. Designs included fictional magazine covers featuring each member for "Love Machine" and badges arranged on a denim jacket for "Wake Me Up", both assembled physically and photographed. Experiments with cut-out Polaroids also inspired the white outlines used on the album and "I'll Stand by You" sleeves. Form returned to the album for its twentieth-anniversary vinyl release in 2024. West revisited his scrapbook archive to select original Polaroids and photo shoot outtakes, which were incorporated into the new packaging alongside lyrics.

== Promotion ==
Promotion for What Will the Neighbours Say? accompanied efforts to manage Girls Aloud's growing tabloid profile. Polydor's head of press helped coordinate their public appearances and interactions with photographers, balancing the publicity generated by their nightlife with the label's preferred image. On 30 October 2004, the band performed an MTV Hits concert special that later appeared on the 2005 video release Girls on Film.

=== Singles ===
The album includes "Jump", which previously appeared on the 2003 reissue of Sound of the Underground and the Love Actually soundtrack. The single reached number two on the UK Singles Chart in November 2003. In the group's autobiography, Dreams That Glitter, Cheryl Cole identified its release as a turning point towards a lighter image, describing their earlier approach as "quite down and moody".

Promotion of What Will the Neighbours Say? began with "The Show", followed by “Love Machine”; both reached number two on the UK Singles Chart, with the latter holding that position for two consecutive weeks. Ahead of the album’s release, the group recorded the official Children in Need single, "I'll Stand by You". Announced ten days before its release on 15 November 2004, it became their second UK number one single.

"Wake Me Up" concluded the singles campaign, reaching number four and becoming the group's first single to peak outside the UK top three. It subsequently won the 2005 Popjustice £20 Music Prize, following the group's earlier win with "No Good Advice" in 2003.

=== Tour ===
Girls Aloud embarked on their first headlining tour, the What Will the Neighbours Say...? Tour, in May 2005. The initial itinerary comprised 17 dates across the United Kingdom, beginning at Nottingham's Royal Concert Hall on 4 May, and later expanded to include Ireland. Reviewing the opening night, The Guardian's Alexis Petridis praised the group's energetic performances but criticised the ballad segment and occasionally uneven choreography. A concert recording filmed at London's Hammersmith Apollo and produced by Richmond Studios was released on DVD on 7 November 2005. Bonus material included interviews, photograph galleries and the music video for "Long Hot Summer", accompanied by behind-the-scenes footage.

== Critical reception ==
Professional ratings
Review scores
Source	Rating
AllMusic	3.5/5 stars
DIY	4/5 stars
Entertainment.ie	4/5 stars
The Independent	3/5 stars
The Irish Times	4/5 stars
RTÉ.ie	4/5 stars
Stylus Magazine	A−
Yahoo! Music	7/10 stars

What Will the Neighbours Say? received acclaim from music critics. In a review for Stylus Magazine, Todd Burns wrote, "There is no pop in the world like Girls Aloud today." John Murphy of musicOMH labeled What Will the Neighbours Say? "nothing less than the pop album of the year." Petridis of The Guardian similarly hailed it as "a great album: funny, clever, immediate, richly inventive." Girls Aloud were praised for simply making it past their debut. A review by Entertainment.ie's Andrew Lynch said, "Girls Aloud really shouldn't have made it as far as a second album. [...] There's just one problem – the girls have a knack of coming up with utterly infectious pop songs".

What Will the Neighbours Say? did receive mild criticism for being "top-heavy", with the singles comprising the first five songs, which Sharon Mower of AllMusic said "left the second half of the album rather thin on killer tracks." BBC Music's David Hooper agreed, stating that while "Girls Aloud have real staying power", the album "settles into a fairly predictable mix of well-produced tunes covering the various pop styles and themes." In her review for Yahoo! Music, Emma Morgan gave the album 7/10 but called the album "a cheap thrill to be savoured and worn out by next Christmas." Girls Aloud's covers of "I'll Stand by You" and "Jump" were also criticised. Murphy noted, "it's when the girls stray from their regular songwriting team that they become unstuck. [...] The two covers are the only mis-step though here."

== Commercial performance ==
What Will the Neighbours Say? at number six on the UK Albums Chart and spent two weeks in the top ten; its initial chart run lasted 17 consecutive weeks, with subsequent re-entries bringing its total to 24 weeks in the top 100. It ranked 44th on the 2004 year-end chart. On 10 December 2004, the album was certified Gold by the British Phonographic Industry (BPI). It reached Platinum status on 14 May 2010, surpassing sales of over 300,000 units. Following the album's deluxe edition reissue in March 2024, What Will the Neighbours Say? returned to the chart at number 35 and entered the UK Vinyl Albums Chart at number six. On 26 March 2024, the album was certified double Platinum by the BPI for shipments in excess of 600,000 copies.

In Scotland, What Will the Neighbours Say? peaked at number four on the Scottish Albums Charts. In Ireland, the album debuted at number twelve, remaining in the top twenty for eight weeks. By 2005, it had been certified double Platinum by the Irish Recorded Music Association (IRMA) for shipments of more than 30,000 units.

== Track listing ==
All tracks were produced by Brian Higgins and Xenomania.

Standard edition
No.	Title	Writer(s)	Length
1.	"The Show"	Miranda Cooper; Brian Higgins; Tim Powell; Lisa Cowling; Jon Shave	3:36
2.	"Love Machine"	Cooper; Higgins; Powell; Cowling; Nick Coler; Myra Boyle; Shawn Lee	3:25
3.	"I'll Stand by You"	Chrissie Hynde; Tom Kelly; Billy Steinberg	3:43
4.	"Jump"	Steve Mitchell; Marti Sharron; Gary Skardina	3:39
5.	"Wake Me Up"	Cooper; Higgins; Powell; Cowling; Lee; Paul Woods; Yusra Maru'e	3:27
6.	"Deadlines & Diets"	Cooper; Higgins; Matt Gray	3:57
7.	"Big Brother"	Girls Aloud; Cooper; Higgins; Cowling; Tim "Rolf" Larcombe	3:58
8.	"Hear Me Out"	Girls Aloud; Cooper; Higgins; Powell; Cowling	3:42
9.	"Graffiti My Soul"	Cooper; Higgins; Powell; Cowling; Peplab	3:14
10.	"Real Life"	Cooper; Higgins; Cowling; Larcombe	3:41
11.	"Here We Go"	Cooper; Higgins; Gray	3:45
12.	"Thank Me Daddy"	Girls Aloud; Cooper; Higgins; Powell; Cowling; Woods; Larcombe	3:22

UK bonus tracks
No.	Title	Writer(s)	Length
13.	"I Say a Prayer for You" (Nicola Roberts solo)	Girls Aloud; Cooper; Higgins; Powell; Cowling	3:33
14.	"100 Different Ways" (Nadine Coyle solo)	Girls Aloud; Cooper; Higgins; Cowling; Nick Coler	3:41
Total length:			51:15

2024 deluxe edition – disc 2
No.	Title	Writer(s)	Length
1.	"Wicked Game"	Chris Isaak	3:24
2.	"Disco Bunny"	Cooper; Higgins; Powell; Coler	3:16
3.	"Baby When You Go"	Cooper; Higgins; Powell; Coler; Giselle Sommerville; Jason Resch; Niara Scarlett	2:34
4.	"I'll Stand By You" (electronic mix)	Hynde; Kelly; Steinberg	3:25
5.	"Wake Me Up" (alternative version)	Cooper; Higgins; Powell; Cowling; Lee; Paul Woods; Yusra Maru'e	3:26
6.	"Hanging on the Telephone"	Jack Lee	2:39
7.	"Androgynous Girls"	Cooper; Higgins; Coler; Cowling; Lee	4:40
8.	"Loving Is Easy"	Girls Aloud; Cooper; Higgins; Coler; Cowling; Lee; Larcombe	3:02
9.	"History"	Girls Aloud; Cooper; Higgins; Shave; Cowling; Lee; Larcombe	4:37
10.	"I'm Every Woman" (from Discomania)	Nickolas Ashford; Valerie Simpson	3:35
11.	"Love Machine" (demo version)	Cooper; Higgins; Powell; Cowling; Coler; Boyle; Lee	3:05
12.	"Deadlines & Diets" (version 2)	Cooper; Higgins; Matt Gray	3:59
13.	"Love Machine" (CD:UK edit)	Cooper; Higgins; Powell; Cowling; Coler; Boyle; Lee	3:05
14.	"The Show" (Popworld edit)	Cooper; Higgins; Powell; Cowling; Shave	3:05
15.	"I'll Stand By You" (tv edit)	Hynde; Kelly; Steinberg	3:26
16.	"Wake Me Up" (Off the Record edit)	Cooper; Higgins; Powell; Cowling; Lee; Paul Woods; Yusra Maru'e	3:10
Total length:			54:36

2024 deluxe edition – disc 3
No.	Title	Writer(s)	Length
1.	"Love Machine" (Tony Lamezma's club mix radio edit)	Cooper; Higgins; Powell; Cowling; Coler; Boyle; Lee	3:47
2.	"Wake Me Up" (Tony Lamezma's "Love Affair" radio edit)	Cooper; Higgins; Powell; Cowling; Lee; Paul Woods; Yusra Maru'e	3:56
3.	"The Show" (Flip & Fill remix)	Cooper; Higgins; Powell; Cowling; Shave	3:40
4.	"I'll Stand By You" (Tony Lamezma's club romp radio edit)	Hynde; Kelly; Steinberg	3:58
5.	"Love Machine" (Gravitas disco mix radio edit)	Cooper; Higgins; Powell; Cowling; Coler; Boyle; Lee	3:38
6.	"Wake Me Up" (Flip & Fill remix)	Cooper; Higgins; Powell; Cowling; Lee; Paul Woods; Yusra Maru'e	6:19
7.	"The Show" (Bang Bang Klub vocal mix)	Cooper; Higgins; Powell; Cowling; Shave	8:46
8.	"I'll Stand By You" (Gravitas vocal dub mix edit)	Hynde; Kelly; Steinberg	6:27
9.	"The Show" (Tony Lamezma's club mix)	Cooper; Higgins; Powell; Cowling; Shave	5:46
10.	"Wake Me Up" (Gravitas club mix)	Cooper; Higgins; Powell; Cowling; Lee; Paul Woods; Yusra Maru'e	5:29
11.	"Love Machine" (Tony Lamezma's Full-Length club mix)	Cooper; Higgins; Powell; Cowling; Coler; Boyle; Lee	6:20
12.	"The Show" (Bang Bang Klub alternative mix)	Cooper; Higgins; Powell; Cowling; Shave	7:42
13.	"Wake Me Up" (Tony Lamezma's "Love Affair")	Cooper; Higgins; Powell; Cowling; Lee; Paul Woods; Yusra Maru'e	7:01
14.	"The Show" (Gravitas club mix)	Cooper; Higgins; Powell; Cowling; Shave	6:51
Total length:			92:00

Sample credits

- "Graffiti My Soul" contains a sample of the Peplab song "It's Not the Drug".

Notes

- "I'll Stand by You" is a cover of the Anglo-American rock band, the Pretenders.
- "Jump" is a cover of the American R&B group the Pointer Sisters. The song also appeared on the re-issue of Sound of the Underground.
- The tracks "Deadlines & Diets" and "Here We Go" are covers of the Xenomania songwriter, Miranda "Moonbaby" Cooper. The original version of the latter was also covered by Lene Nystrøm in 2003. The Moonbaby version was used as the theme song for the animated series Totally Spies!.
- "Baby When You Go" was originally recorded in 2004 by the pop duo Mania, composed of Xenomania songwriters Niara Scarlett and Giselle Sommerville.
- "Wicked Game" is a cover of American rock musician Chris Isaak's 1989 single of the same name.

== Charts ==
=== Weekly charts ===
Weekly chart performance for What Will the Neighbours Say?
Chart (2004–24)	Peak position
Irish Albums (IRMA)	12
Scottish Albums (Official Charts)	4
UK Albums (Official Charts)	6
UK Vinyl Albums (OCC)	6

=== Year-end charts ===
2004 year-end performance for What Will the Neighbours Say?
Chart (2004)	Position
UK Albums (OCC)	44

2005 year-end performance for What Will the Neighbours Say?
Chart (2005)	Position
UK Albums (OCC)	136

== Certifications ==
Certifications for What Will the Neighbours Say?
Region	Certification	Certified units/sales
Ireland (IRMA)	2× Platinum	30,000^{^}
United Kingdom (BPI)	2× Platinum	600,000^{^}
^{^} Shipments figures based on certification alone.

== Release history ==
What Will the Neighbours Say? release history
Region	Date	Edition(s)	Format(s)	Label(s)	Ref.
United Kingdom	29 November 2004	Standard	CD; digital download	Polydor	
United States	26 June 2007	Standard	Digital download	Interscope	
Various	8 March 2024	Deluxe	CD; digital download; streaming; vinyl	Universal Music Operations	
