= Play with Me (album) =

Studio album by Lene
- Released: 21 September 2003
- Recorded: 2001–2003
- Genre: Discodance
- Length: 43:07
- Label: Polydor
- Producers: Arnthor & BAG; Bink; Bloodshy & Avant; Matt Gray; Brian Higgins; Lucas; Paul Meehan; Søren N. Rasted; Brian Rawling; Jeremy Wheatley; Xenomania; Yoga

Singles from Play with Me
- 1. "It's Your Duty" Released: 8 September 2003; 2. "Pretty Young Thing" Released: 16 February 2004

Play with Me is the only studio album by Norwegian singer Lene. It was released on 21 September 2003 by Polydor Records.

== Chart performance ==
The album charted at #30 in Denmark and #74 in Norway.

== Track listing ==
| No. | Title | Writer(s) | Producer(s) | Length |
|---|---|---|---|---|
| 1. | "Virgin Superstar" | Anders Bagge; Arnthor Birgisson; Karen Poole; Lene; Sebastian Nylund | Arnthor & BAG | 3:24 |
| 2. | "Pretty Young Thing" | Stella Katsoudas; Steve Torch; Walter Turbitt | Brian Rawling; Paul Meehan | 4:24 |
| 3. | "It's Your Duty" | Lucas; Poole; Lene | Lucas | 3:06 |
| 4. | "Play with Me" | Per Kalenius; Jens Bjurman; Poole; Lene | Yoga | 3:05 |
| 5. | "Bad Coffee Day" | Bagge; Birgisson; Poole; Nylund; Lene | Arnthor & BAG | 4:44 |
| 6. | "Here We Go" | Miranda Cooper; Brian Higgins; Matt Gray; Lene | Higgins; Grey; Xenomania | 3:43 |
| 7. | "Bite You" | Kalenius; Bjurman; Angela Hunte; Lene | Yoga | 3:29 |
| 8. | "Up in Smoke" | Felix Howard; Christian Karlsson; Pontus Winnberg; Henrik Jonback | Bloodshy & Avant | 3:38 |
| 9. | "We Wanna Party" | Cooper; Lisa Cowling; Higgins; Xenomania; Lene | Higgins; Xenomania; Jeremy Wheatley | 3:18 |
| 10. | "Pants Up" | Kandi Burruss | Bink | 3:31 |
| 11. | "Surprise" | Kalenius; Bjurman; Ruby Amanfu | Yoga | 3:01 |
| 12. | "Scream" | Søren N. Rasted; Dawn Jones; Lene | Rasted | 3:44 |
| Total length: | | | | 43:07 |

Japanese bonus tracks
| No. | Title | Writer(s) | Length |
|---|---|---|---|
| 13. | "Doin' It to You" | Howard; Bjurman; Kalenius | 3:53 |
| 14. | "Paper Bag" | Joakim Björklund; Savan Kotecha | 3:12 |
| Total length: | | | 50:12 |

== Release history ==
| Country | Date | Label |
|---|---|---|
| Japan | 21 September 2003 | Universal |
| Germany | 29 September 2003 | Universal |
| Poland | 29 September 2003 | Universal |
| Netherlands | 2 December 2003 | Universal |
