= Wake Me Up (Girls Aloud song) =

2005 single by Girls Aloud

Single by Girls Aloud

from the album What Will the Neighbours Say?
- B-side: "History"; "Loving Is Easy"
- Released: 21 February 2005
- Recorded: 2004
- Genre: Pop rock; garage rock; dance-rock
- Length: 3:27
- Label: Polydor
- Songwriters: Miranda Cooper; Brian Higgins; Tim Powell; Shawn Lee; Lisa Cowling; Paul Woods; Yusra Maru'e
- Producers: Brian Higgins; Xenomania

Girls Aloud singles chronology
"I'll Stand by You" (2004)	"Wake Me Up" (2005)	"Long Hot Summer" (2005)

Music video
- "Wake Me Up" on YouTube

"Wake Me Up" is a song recorded by British girl group Girls Aloud from their second studio album, What Will the Neighbours Say? (2004). It was released by Polydor Records on 21 February 2005, as the fourth and final single from the album. The song had been initially considered as the lead single, however, it was deemed to sound too harsh and the record company did not want to take the risk. The track was written by Miranda Cooper, Brian Higgins, Tim Powell, Shawn Lee, Lisa Cowling, Paul Woods and Yusra Maru'e. "Wake Me Up" is a pop rock song composed of a "garage rock guitar riff". It received mixed reviews from music critics. While some described it as predictable, others wrote that it appeared to be an attempt to recapture the sound of some of their previous release. Alex Kapranos, the lead singer of indie rock band Franz Ferdinand, said "Wake Me Up" inspired the band to work with producer Brian Higgins.

"Wake Me Up" debuted and peaked at number 4 on the UK Singles Chart, and became the band's first single to miss the top three. The song also peaked inside the top ten in Ireland, but missed the top ten in Europe. The accompanying music video was directed by Harvey & Carolyn, and portrays the band as rocker chicks as they ride motorcycles along a desert road. "Wake Me Up" has been performed on all of the group's concert tours, and also in a few live television appearances, including twice at the Top of the Pops, where Harley Davidson lent motorbikes for the members to use for the first performance, and at Today with Des and Mel. In 2005, "Wake Me Up" won the award for the Popjustice £20 Music Prize, an annual prize awarded by a panel of judges organised by music website Popjustice to the singer(s) of the best British pop single of the past year.

== Background and release ==
"We've been interested in Brian for years. His production of Girls Aloud's Wake Me Up first caught my attention. I remember thinking: 'What the hell is that? It's amazing'. There was something about their sound which was immediate but dangerous - rare in a girl group. It was really edgy."

— Alex Kapranos, the lead singer of indie rock band Franz Ferdinand, says the song inspired the band to work with "Wake Me Up" producer Brian Higgins.

Following a brief hiatus, Polydor Records enlisted Brian Higgins and Xenomania to produce Girls Aloud's second album in its entirety, following the success of their debut album. Higgins explained that Polydor were not going to continue with the group's contract unless he produced songs for the album. He continued, saying that his initial reaction was that he thought he would only be required to produce a couple of songs, however Polydor insisted that he produce the album in its entirety and that they thought only he understood what they wanted. The album was recorded from April to September 2004, with the lead single being released in June 2004.

For the lead single from What Will the Neighbours Say?, Polydor presented the band four singles choices, including "The Show", "Wake Me Up", "Graffiti My Soul", and "Androgynous Girls". Although "Wake Me Up" was the preferred choice, and also Sarah Harding's favorite from the album, it was deemed to sound too harsh and the record company did not want to take the risk. They also added "Androgynous Girls" as a b-side to the album's second single three months later. "The pressure to come up with singles was, as always, immense. But [...] we were able to have a lot of fun working on ideas that were maybe a little too odd to be on the radio," Higgins said. They decided to release "The Show", which was debuted on 28 June 2004, less than six months after the release of "Jump".

"Wake Me Up" was eventually released as the fourth and final single from the album on 21 February 2005. The first verse was recorded on the last day of sessions for What Will the Neighbours Say?. Kimberley Walsh's "dressed up and put on my make up" line was considered a "pivotal" point in the recording process. "Wake Me Up" was released on two CD single formats, as well as an additional 7" picture disc. The first disc included a remix of Girls Aloud's previous single, a cover version of The Pretenders' "I'll Stand by You". The second CD format included the Tony Lamezma's Love Affair remix of "Wake Me Up", as well as an exclusive b-side: the previously unreleased ballad, entitled "History", which was co-written by the band. The 7" picture disc includes the Gravitas Club Mix of "Wake Me Up" and another new b-side: another ballad, "Loving Is Easy", which was also co-written by Girls Aloud. It only appeared on vinyl until its inclusion on the special edition rarities disc of Girls Aloud's first greatest hits album, The Sound of Girls Aloud, along with a demo version of "Wake Me Up", which features an alternate first verse.

== Composition and critical reception ==
Girls Aloud - Wake Me Up
A 21 second sample of "Wake Me Up", a fast-paced pop rock song. MusicOMH reviewer John Murphy said that the song "marries a garage rock guitar sound to strange, almost Aphex Twin-like sound effects."

Described as having a garage rock inspired guitar riff, "Wake Me Up" is a fast-paced pop rock song that "marries a garage rock guitar sound to strange, almost Aphex Twin-like sound effects." It was reported that Girls Aloud were going to re-record the song because "ducers are wary of playing the song on children's TV in its unaltered form." Alexis Petridis of The Guardian said that the song sounds like what would happen if "you married an alarmingly fast techno thud to an implausibly dumb three-chord garage rock riff." A BBC Music critic, however, deemed the track, along with "Deadlines & Diets" and "I Say a Prayer for You", a "fairly predictable mix of well-produced tunes covering the various pop styles and themes." Reviewing Girls Aloud's first greatest hits album, Paul Scott of Stylus Magazine said that "Wake Me Up", "Long Hot Summer" (2005) and "Something Kinda Ooooh" (2006), "all feel, to varying degrees, like attempts to recapture [the] seductive bludgeoning" of "The Show". In 2005, "Wake Me Up" won the award for the Popjustice £20 Music Prize, an annual prize awarded by a panel of judges organised by music website Popjustice to the singer(s) of the best British pop single of the past year.

== Music video ==
The music video for "Wake Me Up" was directed by Harvey & Carolyn. It opens with Harding pulling down her bike helmet, followed by the helmeted faces of all five band members being shown with a title screen. The girls' helmets fly off their heads as they get on their motorcycles. At the front, the girls' names are on them. In subsequent scenes, the band members are shown racing on motorcycles along a desert road. Following the topic of the song, the members are seen applying fake tattoos, painting their nails, and blow-drying their hair, all still while riding on their motorcycles. At one point, the girls dismount from their bikes to dance, but eventually they return to the motorcycles and ride off into the distance.

== Live performances ==
Girls Aloud performed "Wake Me Up" on Top of the Pops on 28 January 2005. Harley Davidson lent motorbikes for the members to use for the performance. The band performed the track on the programme again on 4 March 2005. It was also performed on Today with Des and Mel, and at V Festival 2008. Girls Aloud have included "Wake Me Up" in all of their tours. For their debut tour, 2005's What Will the Neighbours Say...? Tour, the group performed the song in schoolgirl uniforms. For 2006's Chemistry Tour, it was performed as part of a medley alongside Chemistry album track "Wild Horses". It was also performed during 2007's The Greatest Hits Tour. On 2008's Tangled Up Tour, "Wake Me Up" was performed in a medley with "Walk This Way", and on 2009's Out of Control Tour, the song was included in a greatest hits medley which closed the concerts. In 2013, the song was performed during the Ten: The Hits Tour.

== Formats and track listings ==
These are the formats and track listings of major single releases of "Wake Me Up".

- CD single – CD 1
1. "Wake Me Up" – 3:27
2. "I'll Stand by You" (Gravitas Vocal Dub Mix Edit) – 6:26
- CD single – CD 2
1. "Wake Me Up" – 3:27
2. "Wake Me Up" (Tony Lamezma's Love Affair) – 7:01
3. "History" (Girls Aloud, Cooper, Higgins, Cowling, Jon Shave, Tim "Rolf" Larcombe, Lee) – 4:37
4. "Wake Me Up" (video) – 3:27
5. "Wake Me Up" (karaoke video) – 3:27
6. "Wake Me Up" (game)
- 7" vinyl
1. "Wake Me Up" – 3:27
2. "Loving Is Easy" (Girls Aloud, Cooper, Higgins, Cowling, Lee) – 3:01
3. "Wake Me Up" (Gravitas Club Mix) – 5:29
- The Singles Boxset
1. "Wake Me Up" – 3:27
2. "I'll Stand by You" (Gravitas Vocal Dub Mix Edit) – 6:26
3. "Wake Me Up" (Tony Lamezma's Love Affair) – 7:01
4. "History" – 4:37
5. "Loving Is Easy" – 3:01
6. "Wake Me Up" (Gravitas Club Mix) – 5:29
7. "Wake Me Up" (alternative version) – 3:27
8. "Wake Me Up" (video) – 3:27
9. "Wake Me Up" (karaoke video) – 3:27
10. "Wake Me Up" (game)
- Digital EP
1. "Wake Me Up" – 3:27
2. "I'll Stand By You" (Gravitas Vocal Dub Mix Edit) – 6:26
3. "Wake Me Up" (Tony Lamezma's "Love Affair") – 7:00
4. "History" – 4:36
5. "Loving Is Easy" – 3:01
6. "Wake Me Up" (Gravitas Club Mix) – 5:29
7. "Wake Me Up" (Alternative Lyrics Version) – 3:25

== Personnel ==
- Nadine Coyle – co-lead vocals
- Cheryl Tweedy – co-lead vocals
- Sarah Harding – co-lead vocals
- Nicola Roberts – co-lead vocals
- Kimberley Walsh – co-lead vocals

== Chart performance ==
On the week ending on 27 February 2005, "Wake Me Up" debuted at number four on the UK Singles Chart with first-week sales of 16,351 copies, becoming Girls Aloud's eighth top five single but their first single to miss the top three. It fell to number ten the following week. "Wake Me Up" is Girls Aloud 18th best-selling single in the United Kingdom. In Ireland, the single debuted and peaked at number six, falling to number 11 the following week. "Wake Me Up" failed to debut at the top ten in Europe, peaking at number 13 on the European Hot 100 Singles.

== Charts ==
=== Weekly charts ===
Chart (2005)	Peak position
Europe (Eurochart Hot 100)	13
Ireland (IRMA)	6
Scottish Singles Sales (Official Charts)	4
UK Singles (Official Charts)	4
UK Airplay (Music Week)	20

=== Year-end charts ===
Chart (2005)	Position
UK Singles (OCC)	119
