= It's Your Duty =

Single by Lene

from the album Play with Me
- B-side: "Queen for a Day"
- Released: 8 September 2003
- Recorded: 2002–2003
- Genre: Europop
- Length: 3:06
- Label: Polydor
- Songwriters: Karen Poole, Lene Nystrøm, Lucas Secon
- Producer: Lucas Secon

Lene singles chronology
"It's Your Duty" (2003)	"Pretty Young Thing" (2004)

"It's Your Duty" is the debut solo single by Norwegian singer Lene Nystrøm, released on 8 September 2003 from her sole album, Play with Me (2003). The song peaked at No. 3 on the Danish charts.

== Track listing ==
- UK CD single
1. "It's Your Duty" (Album Version) - 3:06
2. "It's Your Duty" (Mark Picchiotti Remix) - 7:30
- UK CD promo (LENE 2; Released: July, 2003)
1. "It's Your Duty" - 3:06
- UK 12" vinyl promo

A1. "It's Your Duty" (Mark Picchiotti Remix) - 7:30
B1. "It's Your Duty" (Bimbo Jones Dub) - 6:19

- Europe and Japan CD single
1. "It's Your Duty" – 3:06
2. "Queen for a Day" – 3:26
3. "It's Your Duty" (Mark Picchiotti Remix) – 7:30
4. "It's Your Duty" (Enhanced Video) – 3:06
- Europe & Japan promo CD
1. "It's Your Duty" - 3:06

== Charts ==
Chart (2003)	Peak position
Denmark (Tracklisten)	3
Italy (FIMI)	19
Norway (VG-lista)	9
Spain (Promusicae)	15
Sweden (Sverigetopplistan)	58

== Release history ==
Country	Date	Label
Japan	21 September 2003	Universal
Germany	22 September 2003	Universal
