= What Will the Neighbours Say...? Tour =

2005 concert tour by Girls Aloud

- Tour by Girls Aloud
- Cover of itinerary guide for the tour
- Associated albums: Sound of the Underground; What Will the Neighbours Say?
- Start date: 4 May 2005
- End date: 2 June 2005
- Legs: 1
- No. of shows: 21

Girls Aloud concert chronology
- What Will the Neighbours Say...? Tour (2005); Chemistry: The Tour (2006)

The What Will the Neighbours Say...? Tour was the first concert tour by British all-female pop group Girls Aloud. It supported their first two studio albums, Sound of the Underground and What Will the Neighbours Say?. Girls Aloud initially planned to tour in 2003 with their fellow Popstars: The Rivals contestants; however, the tour was cancelled due to poor ticket sales. Girls Aloud announced their first headlining tour in December 2004. Girls Aloud performed 22 dates in theatre-sized venues across the United Kingdom and Ireland, beginning in Nottingham on 4 May 2005 and concluding in Dublin on 2 June 2005.

The show, featuring a stairway on the stage, was divided into four distinct sections, including a ballad section. The set list consisted of songs from Girls Aloud's first two albums, as well as cover versions. The tour received generally favourable reviews from critics. The tour was a commercial success, allowing Girls Aloud to perform in arenas for their Chemistry Tour in 2006. In November 2005, the show was released on DVD as What Will the Neighbours Say? Live in Concert.

== Background ==
Girls Aloud had previously planned to embark on a Popstars: The Rivals tour in March 2003, alongside their fellow winners One True Voice as well as other contestants. However, the tour was cancelled due to poor ticket sales. The tour would have included shows at London's Wembley Arena and Birmingham's National Exhibition Centre. Girls Aloud's manager at the time, Louis Walsh said the group would tour by themselves later in the year; however, these plans never came into fruition.

Seventeen tour dates were initially announced by various news sources in December 2004. Tickets went on sale on 10 December 2004. Extra shows were added at the Manchester Apollo and London's Hammersmith Apollo respectively, due to the high demand. Three more dates for Ireland and Northern Ireland were added, one at Belfast's Waterfront Hall and two at Dublin's Olympia Theatre. "We've been itching to do this for a long time", Kimberley Walsh told press. "We decided to wait until we had two albums worth of songs to perform before we took to the stage. The time is right for us to give the fans a show they deserve."

== Concert synopsis ==
The first song performed is "The Show", the first single from What Will the Neighbours Say?. Girls Aloud appear at the top of a stairway and greet the fans, wearing tight jeans and metallic tops, before performing album track "Here We Go". The opening section of the show closes with Girls Aloud's cover of the Duran Duran song "Girls on Film". For the show's second section, Girls Aloud perform in sexualised versions of school uniforms. Pink Floyd's "Another Brick in the Wall" serves as an introduction to "No Good Advice". They then perform the album track "Graffiti My Soul" and the single "Wake Me Up". Girls Aloud perform "a poppy version" of Wheatus' "Teenage Dirtbag", led by Nicola Roberts.

Girls Aloud wear long dresses for the third section of the tour, which is a ballad section. The group opens the set with their single "Life Got Cold", followed by the album track "Deadlines & Diets". The final song in this section is a cover of The Pretenders' "I'll Stand by You", previously a number one hit for Girls Aloud. The final section of the show begins with the single "Love Machine" and the album track "Real Life". A cover of Chic's "Le Freak" is incorporated into the debut album track "Girls Allowed". The group has a disco dance-off. Girls Aloud end the show with their cover of The Pointer Sisters' "Jump", before returning with an encore of their debut single "Sound of the Underground" with an extended dance breakdown.

== Opening acts ==
- Cookie
- Kute
- Triple 8 (London dates only)

== Setlist ==
1. "The Show"
2. "Here We Go"
3. "Girls on Film"
4. "Another Brick in the Wall"/"No Good Advice" (contains elements of "My Sharona")
5. "Graffiti My Soul"
6. "Wake Me Up"
7. "Teenage Dirtbag"
8. "Life Got Cold"
9. "Deadlines & Diets"
10. "I'll Stand By You"
11. "Love Machine"
12. "Real Life"
13. "Girls Allowed"/"Le Freak"
14. "Jump"
15. "Sound of the Underground"

== Tour dates ==
Date	City	Country	Venue
4 May 2005	Nottingham	England	Nottingham Royal Concert Hall
5 May 2005	Brighton	England	Brighton Centre
7 May 2005	Plymouth	England	Plymouth Pavilions
8 May 2005	Cardiff	Wales	Cardiff International Arena
9 May 2005	Oxford	England	New Theatre Oxford
11 May 2005	Blackpool	England	Opera House Theatre
12 May 2005	Carlisle	England	Sands Centre
13 May 2005	Glasgow	Scotland	Clyde Auditorium
14 May 2005	Edinburgh	Scotland	Edinburgh Playhouse
16 May 2005	Newcastle	England	Newcastle City Hall
18 May 2005	Manchester	England	Manchester Apollo
19 May 2005	Manchester	England	Manchester Apollo
20 May 2005	Sheffield	England	Hallam FM Arena
21 May 2005	Birmingham	England	National Indoor Arena
23 May 2005	Bristol	England	Colston Hall
24 May 2005	Portsmouth	England	Portsmouth Guildhall
25 May 2005	Ipswich	England	Regent Theatre
27 May 2005	Liverpool	England	Liverpool Empire Theatre
28 May 2005	London	England	Hammersmith Apollo
29 May 2005	London	England	Hammersmith Apollo
31 May 2005	Belfast	Northern Ireland	Waterfront Hall
1 June 2005	Dublin	Ireland	Olympia Theatre
2 June 2005	Dublin	Ireland	Olympia Theatre

== Broadcast and recordings ==
What Will the Neighbours Say? Live in Concert

Video by Girls Aloud
- Released: 7 November 2005
- Recorded: 28–29 May 2005; Hammersmith Apollo
- Genre: Pop rock
- Length: 175 minutes
- Label: Polydor
- Director: Jonathan Potts

Girls Aloud chronology
Girls on Film (2005)	''What Will the Neighbours Say? Live in Concert'' (2005)	Girls Aloud: Greatest Hits Live From Wembley Arena (2006)

The show was recorded at the Hammersmith Apollo on 28 and 29 May 2005. The recording has been broadcast on Channel 4 in the United Kingdom. A DVD of the concert, What Will the Neighbours Say? Live in Concert, was released on 7 November 2005. The footage was directed and edited by Jonathan Potts, while David Venni provided photography. The DVD was produced by Richmond Studios. They used in-house video production skills to provide especially shot menus and interviews with the Girls. In addition to the show in its entire, the DVD consists of bonus material, such as the music video for "Long Hot Summer" and a featurette documenting its creation. Photo galleries, screen savers, interviews with Girls Aloud, an interactive game, and a making of the DVD are also included. The DVD charted within the top ten of the DVD chart.

Audio of "Love Machine" and "Real Life" were included on the single release of "Long Hot Summer". Later, an audio recording of the "Teenage Dirtbag" performance was included as a b-side to Girls Aloud's 2006 single "Whole Lotta History". A studio recording of the cover was finally released in 2007 on the compilation Radio 1: Established 1967.

== Critical reception ==
In a review of the DVD, MusicOMH stated "this features all that you'd ever want from a pop concert [...] almost every song is a cracker."
