= Jump (For My Love) =

1984 single by the Pointer Sisters

- U.S. reissue single

Single by the Pointer Sisters

from the album Break Out
- B-side: "Heart Beat"
- Released: April 11, 1984
- Recorded: 1983
- Studio: Studio 55 (Los Angeles)
- Genre: Dance-pop; electropop; R&B
- Length: 4:23 (album version); 3:59 (radio version); 6:24 (extended version)
- Label: Planet; RCA
- Songwriters: Stephen Mitchell; Marti Sharron; Gary Skardina
- Producer: Richard Perry

The Pointer Sisters singles chronology
"Automatic" (1984)	"Jump (For My Love)" (1984)	"I'm So Excited" (1984)

Music video
- "Jump (For My Love)" on YouTube

"Jump (For My Love)" (originally titled "Jump") is an electropop song by American girl group the Pointer Sisters, released on April 11, 1984, as the third single from their tenth studio album, Break Out (1983). The song hit the top ten on the US Billboard Hot 100, R&B, and Dance charts, and it was the best-selling American dance single of 1984, sold as a trio of songs including "I Need You" and "Automatic". The song features June Pointer on lead vocals and scored global chart success.

Girls Aloud remade the song as "Jump", which saw a release in November 2003.

== History ==
"Jump (For My Love)" features June Pointer on lead vocals. It was co-written by regular collaborators Marti Sharron, Gary Skardina, and Stephen Mitchell. Skardina and Mitchell were responsible for the chord progressions, melody, and arrangement while Sharron's focus was on the lyrics and melody. According to Sharron the instrumental track for the demo of "Jump" was completed before the lyrics: on first hearing the playback of the instrumental track in the studio (Marti Sharron quote:) "My partners and I...were so happy with the results we jumped up and down" which led to the song being called "Jump". Sharron recalls phoning Richard Perry, who was producing the Pointer Sisters' upcoming album, and telling him: "I have the album's big hit" and - although Perry considered giving the song to Julio Iglesias, Perry being a contributing producer to the singer's 1100 Bel Air Place album - "Jump" did become the final song slated for the Pointer Sister's 1983 album release Break Out. After Van Halen hit number one with their similarly-titled "Jump", the Pointer Sisters song would take on its current title "Jump (For My Love)".

Despite being one of the last songs recorded for the album, "Jump (For My Love)" would be the first song on the album's song listing. It would be released as the album's third single, with the ballad "I Need You" being the first single, which continued the Pointer Sisters' presence at R&B radio. "Automatic" eventually became the album's second single as it had enjoyed dance club airplay as an album cut and the record company wanted to capitalize on that. "Automatic" returned the Pointer Sisters to top ten after a three-year absence. "Jump..." became the most successful US single off of Break Out upon its release as the album's third single in April 1984. "Jump" ascended to a peak of number three on both the US Hot 100 and R&B chart in Billboard magazine that July, with the song also charting on Billboard's adult contemporary chart at number 11.

"Jump (For My Love)" would give the Pointer Sisters an international hit, charting in Belgium, West Germany, Ireland, the Netherlands, New Zealand, Switzerland, and the UK. In Australia, "Jump..." was issued as the lead single off Break Out in December 1983 and peaked at number 79: reissued after "Automatic," it would reach an Australian chart peak of number eight in September 1984. "Jump" featured June Pointer on lead vocals and the international release was somewhat unique. The Australian single release featured as the B-side the Break Out song "Operator" with Anita Pointer on lead. In other territories, the sing's B-side was "Heart Beat", a song with Ruth Pointer on lead, and that was initially on the Pointer Sisters' previous album So Excited!. Released prior to the 1984 Summer Olympics, "Jump (For My Love)" featured footage of athletes competing in track and field events, as well as NBA stars Julius Erving and Magic Johnson.

The Pointer Sisters won the 1985 Grammy Award for Best Pop Performance by a Duo or Group with Vocal for "Jump...", and co-writer Stephen (Steve) Mitchell received his nomination for the Grammy Award for Best Pop Instrumental Performance in 1985 for his musical performance as the principal musician on the song's recording. Although the group scored several Top 20 hits on the Hot 100, "Jump (For My Love)" is viewed as the signature song for the group.

At the 1985 ASCAP Pop Awards, "Jump (For My Love)" received "Most Performed Song" honors for songs in the ASCAP repertory during the 1984 ASCAP Survey Year.

"Jump (For My Love)" is published by Sony/ATV Music Publishing, Anidraks Music, Inc., and Stephen Mitchell Music, Inc.

== Track listings ==
Australia and New Zealand 7-inch single (Planet / 104213)

1. "Jump" – 4:27
2. "Operator" – 4:01

France 7-inch single (Planet / PB 61295)

1. "Jump" – 4:27
2. "Baby Come and Get It" – 4:57

France 12-inch single (Planet / PC 61269)

1. "Jump" – 4:27
2. "Baby Come and Get It" – 4:57
3. "I Need You" (12" version) – 5:51

Mexico 7-inch single (Planet / PR-2)

1. "Jump" – 4:27
2. "I Need You" – 4:01

U.S. 7-inch single (Planet / YB-13780)

1. "Jump (For My Love)" – 3:59
2. "Heart Beat" – 4:22

U.S. 12-inch single (Planet / YW-13781)

1. "Jump (For My Love)" (long version) – 6:24
2. "Jump (For My Love)" (instrumental) – 6:07
3. "Heart Beat" – 4:22

Japan 7-inch single (Planet / PLR-702)

1. "Jump (For My Love)" – 3:59
2. "Automatic" – 4:46

Japan 12-inch single (Planet / PLR-12001)

1. "Jump (For My Love)" (long version) – 6:24
2. "Automatic" (long version) – 6:07

Note: 12-inch singles released in the Australia/New Zealand (TDS-218), Canada (YW-13781), Netherlands (FC-3781), South Africa (TRM 499), Spain (FC-3781), United Kingdom (RPS 106) and West Germany (FC 3781) have the same track list as the U.S. version.

== Personnel ==
The Pointer Sisters

- June Pointer – lead vocals, backing vocals
- Ruth Pointer – backing vocals
- Anita Pointer – backing vocals

Musicians

- Stephen Mitchell – synthesizer, synthesizer programming, drum machine programming
- Howie Rice – Minimoog, additional synthesizers, electronic drums
- Reek Havoc – drum programming
- Paulinho da Costa – percussion

Production

- Producer – Richard Perry
- Associate producers – Gary Skardina & Stephen Mitchell
- Writers – Stephen Mitchell, Marti Sharron & Gary Skardina

== Charts ==
=== Weekly charts ===
Chart (1984)	Peak position
Australia (Kent Music Report)	8
Belgium (Ultratop 50 Flanders)	3
Belgium (VRT Top 30 Flanders)	4
Canada (CHUM)	8
Canada Top Singles (RPM)	8
Canada Adult Contemporary (RPM)	1
Ireland (IRMA)	2
Netherlands (Dutch Top 40)	10
Netherlands (Single Top 100)	9
New Zealand (Recorded Music NZ)	3
South Africa (Springbok Radio)	13
Switzerland (Schweizer Hitparade)	13
UK Singles (Official Charts)	6
US Billboard Hot 100	3
US Adult Contemporary (Billboard)	11
US Hot R&B/Hip-Hop Songs (Billboard)	3
US Dance/Disco Top 80 (Billboard) as Album Cut: I Need You/Automatic/Jump	2
US Cash Box Top 100	6
West Germany (GfK)	20

=== Year-end charts ===
Chart (1984)	Position
Australia (Kent Music Report)	56
Belgium (Ultratop 50 Flanders)	24
Canada Top Singles (RPM)	50
Netherlands (Dutch Top 40)	90
Netherlands (Single Top 100)	91
New Zealand (RIANZ)	40
UK Singles (Gallup)	65
US Billboard Hot 100	18
US Hot Black Singles (Billboard)	25
US Hot Dance/Disco (Billboard) as Album Cut: I Need You/Automatic/Jump	1
US Cash Box Top 100	24
West Germany (Media Control)	48

== Certifications ==
Region	Certification	Certified units/sales
Canada (Music Canada)	Gold	50,000^{^}
New Zealand (RMNZ)	Platinum	30,000^{‡}
United Kingdom (BPI)	Silver	200,000^{‡}
^{^} Shipments figures based on certification alone.^{‡} Sales+streaming figures based on certification alone.

== Girls Aloud version ==
"Jump"

Single by Girls Aloud

from the album Sound of the Underground (reissue), and Love Actually soundtrack
- B-side: "Girls Allowed"; "Grease"; "Love Bomb"
- Released: November 17, 2003
- Recorded: August 2003
- Genre: Dance-pop; electropop; synth-pop
- Length: 3:40
- Label: Polydor
- Songwriters: Stephen Mitchell; Marti Sharron; Gary Skardina
- Producers: Brian Higgins; Xenomania

Girls Aloud singles chronology
"Life Got Cold" (2003)	"Jump" (2003)	"The Show" (2004)

Music video
- "Jump" on YouTube

In 2003, British girl group Girls Aloud covered "Jump" for the soundtrack to the romantic comedy film Love Actually (2003) although ultimately it was not used in the movie; the Pointer Sisters' original version was used instead. Girls Aloud's version was produced by Brian Higgins and his production team Xenomania, recorded at the request of Love Actually director Richard Curtis. Upon its release in November 2003, "Jump" continued Girls Aloud's string of hits, peaking at number two on the UK Singles Chart and receiving a gold certification from the British Phonographic Industry. Their version appeared on the re-release of their debut album Sound of the Underground and was also included on the group's 2004 album What Will the Neighbours Say?. The song was also featured in Just Dance 3 for the Wii, Xbox 360, and PlayStation 3.

The music video was intertwined with scenes from Love Actually to make it appear that Girls Aloud had sneaked into 10 Downing Street to spy on the Prime Minister (Hugh Grant). "Jump" was promoted through various live appearances and has since been performed on all of the group's concert tours.

=== Background and release ===
The director of Love Actually, Richard Curtis, phoned Xenomania while they were in a taxi in Berlin to tell them he thought "Jump" would make a good Girls Aloud single. Girls Aloud's version of "Jump" was not featured in the film itself. Love Actually uses the Pointer Sisters' original version due to international audiences being unaware of Girls Aloud, who feature in the end credits. Girls Aloud do, however, appear on the British soundtrack. The fourth single would have been the album track "Some Kind of Miracle" had the soundtrack opportunity not arisen. Girls Aloud's version retains the 1980s feel of the original, using a Roland Jupiter-6 in the chorus.

The single was released on November 17, 2003, in the UK in two different CD single formats and as a cassette tape. The first disc includes "Girls Allowed", a track from Girls Aloud's debut album Sound of the Underground, and a cover of "Grease" which was recorded for ITV1's Greasemania. The second CD format featured another track from Sound of the Underground, the Betty Boo-produced "Love Bomb", and the Almighty Vocal Mix of "Jump". Meanwhile, the cassette tape (and the European CD) feature the single and the Almighty Vocal Mix of "Girls Allowed". Flip & Fill's remix of "Jump" appeared on CD1 of Girls Aloud's next single, "The Show", and the original Almighty Remix of "Jump" appeared on the "Long Hot Summer" 12" single.

According to Cheryl Cole in Girls Aloud's 2008 autobiography Dreams That Glitter - Our Story, the single was "the point when we realized everything we'd been doing was quite down and moody [...] and that's not what people wanted." Nicola Roberts further stated it was "meant to be. It was a turning point and everyone loved it."

=== Reception ===
==== Critical response ====
Girls Aloud's version was met with mixed reviews. David Hooper of BBC Music complimented the track in his review of Girls Aloud's second album: "Twenty years on, this version updates the song nicely with a welcome return of those buzzy synth sounds and gnarly bass noises from "The Show". Good work." Paul Scott of Stylus Magazine was similarly favourable, saying it "demonstrates their phenomenal power in finding a certain joy in ugliness. It’s an authentic inauthenticity set to the sound of a thousand discothèques. It’s being surrounded by a drunken hen party and finding enchantment instead of repulsion." On the other hand, one music critic said, "...the listener is certainly fed up by the time the song finishes." Alexis Petridis of The Guardian exclaimed, "Xenomania throw everything they have at the track, but can't rescue a duff song." The track was slated by Lisa Verrico of The Times, who said it "takes whatever credibility [Girls Aloud] had left and runs off with it. Horrible bass, klutzy production and so-so singing put the girls at the bottom of the pop pile". RTÉ.ie said that "fans of the group will love it, but the rest of us will just wonder why, particularly since the original is so much better."

==== Chart performance ====
The song debuted at number two on the UK Singles Chart, behind Westlife’s Mandy. Coincidentally, both bands were managed by Louis Walsh at the time. "Jump" was number four on the chart the following week. The single spent four more weeks inside the top twenty. Overall, the song spent a total of fourteen weeks inside the top 75. It was certified gold by the British Phonographic Industry.

On the Irish Singles Chart, "Jump" entered at number two and spent three consecutive weeks at its peak. In its fourth week on the Irish chart, "Jump" slipped just two positions to number four. It spent two more weeks in the top ten at numbers seven and nine respectively, before rising up the chart again to spend two weeks at number six. "Jump" spent a final week in the Irish top ten before falling down the chart.

"Jump" is one of the few Girls Aloud songs that received an international release outside of the United Kingdom and Ireland. Although Girls Aloud's version was not a US hit, it reached the top ten in Belgium, the Netherlands, and Sweden.

=== Music video ===
The music video for "Jump", directed by Katie Bell, was made to appear as if it was intertwined with the film Love Actually. During the video, the members of Girls Aloud sneak into the residence of the Prime Minister, played by Hugh Grant in the film. The group sneaks into 10 Downing Street through a bedroom window before tiptoeing down a set of stairs and looking around an empty, unlit conference room. Girls Aloud eventually re-exit through the window. Various shots of the women singing and dancing, like those featured on the single's artwork, are shown throughout the video. A Grant lookalike was also hired for the music video.

A version of the music video without scenes from Love Actually can be found on Girls Aloud's 2005 DVD release Girls on Film. The video also appears on 2007's Get Girls Aloud's Style.

=== Live performances ===
"Jump" was promoted through various live appearances on television shows across the UK. Girls Aloud appeared on programmes like CD:UK, GMTV, Popworld, The Rolf Harris Show, Top of the Pops, Top of the Pops Saturday (twice), UK Top 40: CBBC Viewers' Vote, and Xchange. They also performed at events such as the UK's National Music Awards and 2003's Children in Need telethon. In Europe, Girls Aloud performed "Jump" on the Netherlands' national lottery Staatsloterij (The State Lottery). During the summer of 2004, Girls Aloud performed the show at a number of festivals and open-air concerts, such as Live & Loud, O2 in the Park, Pop Beach, and CBBC's Junior Great North Run charity concert. Girls Aloud also performed it on their MTV special in October 2004, as seen on the subsequent DVD Girls on Film. In 2006, the group performed "Jump" for a television show entitled All Time Greatest Movie Songs.

Since its release, "Jump" has been included on each of Girls Aloud's tours in some capacity. The track was included as the penultimate song on their 2005 tour What Will the Neighbours Say...? Tour. Performed amidst neon lights, the song's arrangement was closer to the Pointer Sisters' original version. For 2006's Chemistry Tour, "Jump" was included as the encore. The performance included a dance breakdown over a military drum. As the song reached its climax, pyrotechnics went off and confetti fell. There is a final explosion as Girls Aloud descend beneath the stage. It was included in the first section of 2007's The Greatest Hits Tour. The song was included as the penultimate song again for 2008's Tangled Up Tour. The performance included an extended intro in which Girls Aloud commanded the crowd to jump. The song was slightly remixed for this tour. For 2009's Out of Control Tour, "Jump" was included in a greatest hits medley which closed the show.

The single has also been performed at Girls Aloud's appearances at V Festival in 2006 and 2008. They also performed it at Twickenham Stadium in 2006 after a rugby match between the England national rugby union team and New Zealand's.

=== Track listings ===
UK CD1 (Polydor / 9814103)

1. "Jump" – 3:39
2. "Girls Allowed" (Brian McFadden, J. Shorten) – 3:26
3. "Grease" (Barry Gibb) – 3:25

UK CD2 (Polydor / 9814104)

1. "Jump" – 3:39
2. "Love Bomb" (Betty Boo, M. Ward, S. Ward) – 2:52
3. "Jump" (Almighty vocal mix) – 7:34

Australia (Polydor / 7642342)

1. "Jump" – 3:39
2. "Girls Allowed" – 3:26
3. "Grease" (Beatmasters remix) – 4:26*
4. "Jump" (video) – 3:39

UK cassette and Europe (Polydor / 9814531)

1. "Jump" – 3:39
2. "Girls Allowed" (Almighty vocal mix) – 6:15

The Singles Boxset (CD4)

1. "Jump" – 3:39
2. "Girls Allowed" – 3:26
3. "Grease" – 3:25
4. "Love Bomb" – 2:52
5. "Jump" (Almighty vocal mix) – 7:34
6. "Girls Allowed" (Almighty vocal mix) – 6:15
7. "Jump" (Almighty dub) – 7:08

Digital EP

1. "Jump" – 3:39
2. "Girls Allowed" – 3:24
3. "Grease" – 3:27
4. "Love Bomb" – 2:52
5. "Girls Allowed" (Almighty radio edit) – 4:05
6. "Jump" (Almighty vocal mix) – 7:36
7. "Jump" (Flip & Fill remix) – 6:15
8. "Girls Allowed" (Almighty vocal mix) – 6:15
9. "Jump" (Almighty dub mix) – 7:33

- *The sleeve lists the running time of 4:26 instead of the UK's 3:25, and includes the Beatmasters remix of the track as found on the Greasemania album, instead of the normal track, which appears on the UK single.

=== Members ===
- Nadine Coyle – co-lead vocals
- Sarah Harding – co-lead vocals
- Nicola Roberts – co-lead vocals
- Cheryl Tweedy – co-lead vocals
- Kimberley Walsh – co-lead vocals

=== Charts ===
==== Weekly charts ====
Chart (2003–2004)	Peak position
Australia (ARIA)	23
Belgium (Ultratop 50 Flanders)	6
Belgium (Ultratop 50 Wallonia)	33
Europe (Eurochart Hot 100)	8
Hungary (Rádiós Top 40)	22
Ireland (IRMA)	2
Netherlands (Dutch Top 40)	8
Netherlands (Single Top 100)	11
New Zealand (Recorded Music NZ)	13
Poland Airplay (Polish Airplay Charts)	11
Romania (Romanian Top 100)	97
Scottish Singles Sales (Official Charts)	2
Sweden (Sverigetopplistan)	9
Switzerland (Schweizer Hitparade)	58
UK Singles (Official Charts)	2
UK Airplay (Music Week)	20

==== Year-end charts ====
Chart (2003)	Position
Ireland (IRMA)	21
UK Singles (OCC)	42

Chart (2004)	Position
Belgium (Ultratop 50 Flanders)	63
Netherlands (Dutch Top 40)	57
Netherlands (Single Top 100)	64
Sweden (Hitlistan)	69

=== Certifications ===
Region	Certification	Certified units/sales
United Kingdom (BPI)	Gold	499,000
