= The Show (Girls Aloud song) =

2004 single by Girls Aloud

Single by Girls Aloud

from the album What Will the Neighbours Say?
- Released: 28 June 2004
- Recorded: 2004
- Genre: Dance-pop; electropop; Eurodance
- Length: 3:36
- Label: Polydor
- Songwriters: Miranda Cooper; Brian Higgins; Lisa Cowling; Jon Shave; Tim Powell
- Producers: Brian Higgins; Xenomania

Girls Aloud singles chronology
"Jump" (2003)	"The Show" (2004)	"Love Machine" (2004)

Alternative cover
- UK Maxi CD/Australian cover

"The Show" is a song recorded by British girl group Girls Aloud for their second studio album, What Will the Neighbours Say? (2004). It was released by Polydor Records on 28 June 2004, as the lead single from the album. The song was written by Miranda Cooper, Brian Higgins, Lisa Cowling, Jon Shave, and Tim Powell. The synth rhythm, composed by Shave, represents a change in musical direction from the band's previous releases. "The Show" is an uptempo dance-pop, electropop and Eurodance song with elements of the 1990 rave records.

"The Show" garnered a positive response from music critics, who deemed it another unique track produced by Xenomania, and it was considered one of the best songs of 2004 by The Times. It debuted and peaked at number 2 on the UK Singles Chart, continuing the band's string of hits by becoming their fifth consecutive single to chart within the top three. The song also peaked inside the top ten in Ireland and certain European territories. In 2006, it charted at number 67 on Australia's singles chart. The accompanying music video was directed by Trudy Bellinger, and portrays the five members as characters working in a salon. To promote the song, Girls Aloud performed "The Show" at the 2004 Royal Variety Performance and at London gay nightclub G-A-Y. It was also performed on five of the group's concert tours.

== Background and release ==
Following a brief hiatus, Polydor Records enlisted Brian Higgins and Xenomania to produce Girls Aloud's second album in its entirety, following the success of their debut album. Higgins explained that Polydor were not going to continue with the group's contract unless he produced songs for the album. He continued, saying that his initial reaction was that he thought he would only be required to produce a couple of songs, however Polydor insisted that he produce the album in its entirety and that they thought only he understood what they wanted. The album was recorded from April to September 2004. For the lead single from What Will the Neighbours Say?, Polydor presented the band four song choices, including "The Show", "Wake Me Up", "Graffiti My Soul", and "Androgynous Girls". Although "Wake Me Up" was the preferred choice, it was deemed too hard sounding and the record company did not want to take the risk, and they also added "Androgynous Girls" as a b-side to the album's second single three months later. "The pressure to come up with singles was, as always, immense. But [...] we were able to have a lot of fun working on ideas that were maybe a little too odd to be on the radio," Higgins said. They decided to release "The Show", which was debuted on 28 June 2004, less than six months after the release of "Jump". It was released on two different CD single formats, but did not feature any new b-sides. A remix of "Jump" appears on the first disc, while the Gravitas Club Mix of "The Show" and an exclusive interview both appeared on the second disc. "The Show" was also released in Australia two years later, on 3 June 2006, as the second single from the Australian version of Chemistry.

== Composition ==
Girls Aloud – The Show
A 21 second sample of "The Show", which mostly utilises synthesisers, contrary to the band's previous singles that were guitar-influenced. They deliver an anti-promiscuity message with the lyrics.

The song was written by Miranda Cooper, Brian Higgins, Lisa Cowling, Jon Shave, and Tim Powell. Contrary to the verse-chorus form that is typically used in modern pop music, "The Show" opts for a less conventional song structure. It was noted for its intricacy. The song's lyrics, which contain an anti-promiscuity message, "set in motion a writing style that would come to epitomise Girls Aloud's music." In the group's 2008 autobiography Dreams That Glitter – Our Story, Cheryl Cole described Girls Aloud's cover of the Pointer Sisters' "Jump" as "the point when we realized everything we'd been doing was quite down and moody [...] and that's not what people wanted." As their first single following the cover, "The Show" served as an introduction to Girls Aloud's new sound, being "their most risqué cut at the time." Rather than the guitar that dominated the band's first three singles, "The Show" mostly utilises synthesisers. The synth rhythm was composed by a Xenomania musician named Jon Shave. MusicOMH contributor John Murphy deemed the track's composition similar to "Love Machine", which he considered inspired by "'80s synth pop."

== Reception ==
=== Critical response ===
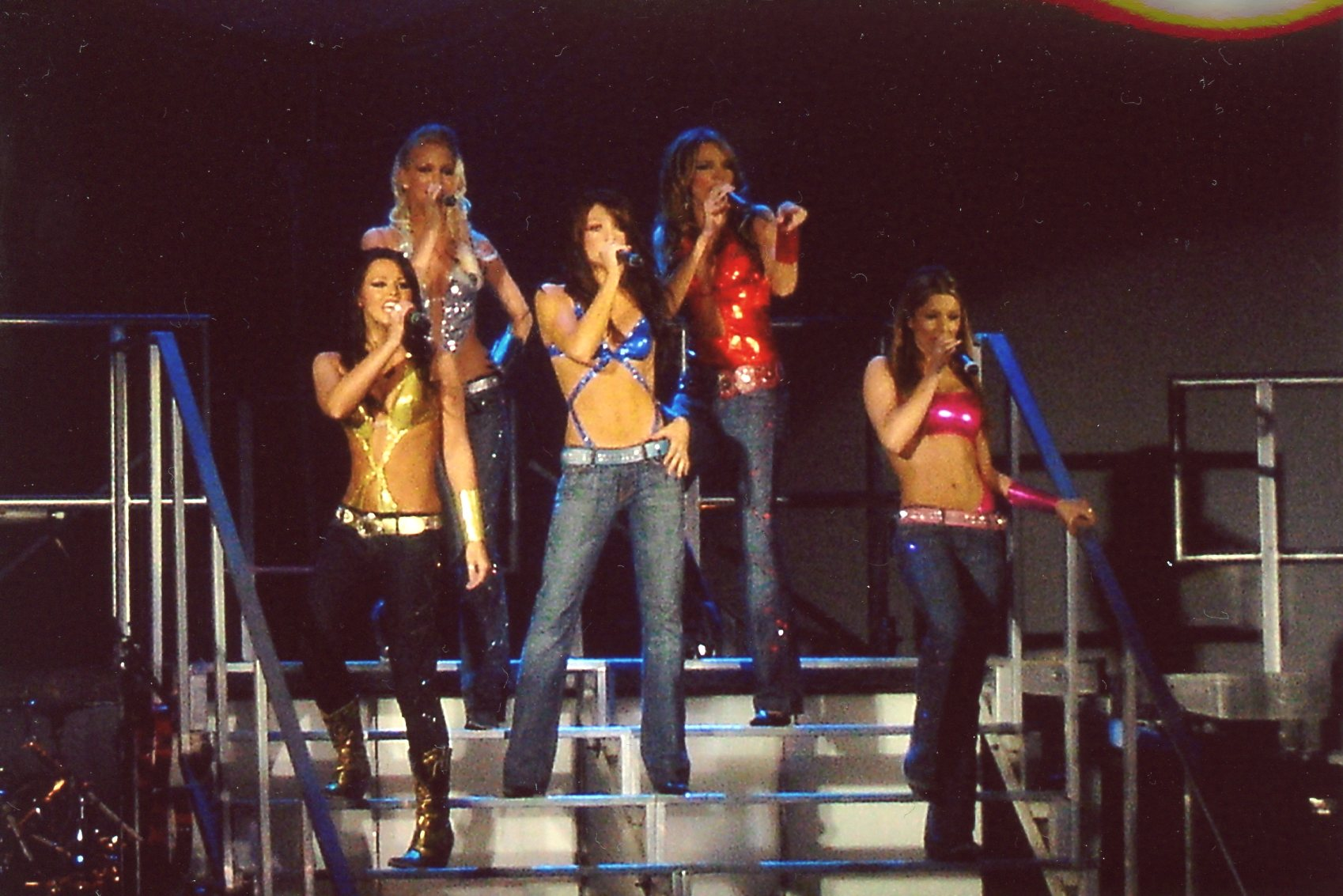
Girls Aloud performing "The Show" on the What Will the Neighbours Say...? Tour (2005).

"The Show" was described by BBC Music as "a feisty, thumping track with a positively rude bassline," while a reviewer for Virgin Media described the song as a "rush of thrilling synth stabs and natty vocal hooks." Paul Scott of Stylus Magazine referred to "The Show" as one of Girls Aloud's best songs, deeming it "audacious to say the least. With its clipped delivery and gnarled synth riffs barely sweetened, it’s SAW doing SST; tungsten and gristle polished to an FM sheen." Alexis Petridis of The Guardian considered "The Show" and "Love Machine" as the perfect examples of Xenomania's unique production, and added that the lead single "is based around a frantically exciting electronic noise that seems to have escaped from an early-1990s rave record." In their best-of-year countdown, The Times noted that the song helped Xenomania to establish themselves as the best pop music production team.

=== Chart performance ===
On the week ending 17 July 2004, "The Show" debuted at number 2 on the UK Singles Chart, being held off the top spot by Usher's "Burn". It fell to number 5 the following week. "The Show" is Girls Aloud 17th best-selling single in the United Kingdom. The single also debuted and peaked at number 9 on the European Hot 100 Singles, falling to number 18 the following week. In Ireland, it debuted at number ten, and peaked at number 5 three weeks later. After its release in Australia in 2006, "The Show" failed to make impact and missed the top forty of the ARIA Charts, debuting and peaking at number 67.

== Music video ==
The accompanying music video for "The Show" was directed by Trudy Bellinger. After the video shoot, Girls Aloud decided it was time to change their choreographer, hiring Beth Honan, who continued to work with the band for several years. Walsh also said that the music video for "The Show" was her least favourite from the band. The story takes place in a salon called "Curls Allowed." Each member of the band plays a character working in the salon, pampering and making-up a variety of men. Nicola Roberts is "Chelsea Tanner," who sprays insulting messages with fake bronzer onto her male customers; Nadine Coyle is "Frenchie", who ineptly tries to give her male customers facials; Sarah Harding is "Supa Styler", a hair stylist who fails to satisfy any of her customers; Cheryl Cole is "Maxi Wax", who makes the waxing process as painful as possible; and Kimberley Walsh is "The Boss", who looks on amusedly as her employees take their revenge on the salon's male customers.

== Live performances ==
Girls Aloud performed "The Show" at 2004's Royal Variety Performance. They also performed the song at London gay nightclub G-A-Y, to promote the release of the single, on 26 June 2004. Girls Aloud have included "The Show" in five of their concert tours. For their first tour, 2005's What Will the Neighbours Say...? Tour, "The Show" served as the opening number. For 2006's Chemistry Tour, each member have individual "stations" modeled after beauty salons, referencing the song's music video. The stations are surrounded by frames, which are illuminated through the song. The group then uses the framework for their dance routine. The following year, on their first greatest hits tour, the band performed the song with a half-naked male dance partner, using a bed for a prop. "The Show" was also performed on 2009's Out of Control Tour, where the song was included in a greatest hits medley which closed the concerts. In 2013, the song was performed in full during the Ten: The Hits Tour in the style of a Victoria's Secret show .

== Formats and track listings ==
These are the formats and track listings of major single releases of "The Show".

- CD single – Part 1
1. "The Show" – 3:36
2. "Jump" (Flip & Fill Remix) – 6:15
- CD single – Part 2'
1. "The Show" – 3:36
2. "The Show" (Gravitas Club Mix) – 6:50
3. "The After Show" (Interview) – 5:30
4. "The Show" (video) – 3:38
5. "The Show" (karaoke video) – 3:38
6. "The Show" (game)
- CD single – Part 3
1. "The Show" – 3:36
2. "Jump" (Flip & Fill Remix) – 6:15
3. "The Show" (Ringtone)
- The Singles Boxset
1. "The Show" – 3:36
2. "Jump" (Flip & Fill Remix) – 6:15
3. "The Show" (Gravitas Club Mix) – 6:50
4. "The After Show" (Interview) – 5:30
5. "The Show" (Tony Lamezma Club Mix)
6. "The Show" (Bang Bang Klub Vocal Mix) – 8:48
7. "The Show" (Bang Bang Dub Mix) – 8:47
8. "The Show" (BBK Alternative Mix) – 7:41
9. "The Show" (video) – 3:38
10. "The Show" (karaoke video) – 3:38
11. "The Show" (game)
- Digital EP
1. "The Show" – 3:36
2. "The Show" (Gravitas Club Mix) – 6:51
3. "The Show" (Tony Lamezma Club Mix) – 5:46
4. "The Show" (Bang Bang Klub Vocal Mix) – 8:46
5. "The Show" (Bang Bang Dub Mix) – 8:44
6. "The Show" (BBK Alternative Mix) – 7:41
7. "The Show" (Flip & Fill Remix) – 5:25
8. "The After Show" (Interview) – 5:32

== Personnel ==
- Nadine Coyle – co-lead vocals
- Cheryl Tweedy – co-lead vocals
- Sarah Harding – co-lead vocals
- Nicola Roberts – co-lead vocals
- Kimberley Walsh – co-lead vocals

== Charts ==
=== Weekly charts ===
2004 weekly chart performance for "The Show"
Chart (2004)	Peak position
Europe (European Hot 100 Singles)	9
Ireland (IRMA)	5
Poland Airplay (Polish Airplay Charts)	20
Romania (Romanian Top 100)	90
Russia Airplay (TopHit)	64
Scottish Singles Sales (Official Charts)	1
UK Singles (Official Charts)	2
UK Airplay (Music Week)	25

2006 weekly chart performance for "The Show"
Chart (2006)	Peak position
Australia (ARIA)	67

=== Year-end charts ===
Year-end chart performance for "The Show"
Chart (2004)	Position
UK Singles (OCC)	76

== In popular culture ==
The 2013 music video for Norwegian singer Annie's lead single "Back Together" from her The A&R EP features the bridge of "The Show" with Sarah Harding's vocals. It appears 17 seconds into the video as the second track in a fictional retro chart countdown; the bridge from "The Show" plays, but the song is credited on-screen as the #4 entry in the chart countdown as the fictional song "This Ol' House" by the fictional artist Deejay Jesu.
