= Dreams that Glitter =

Book by Girls Aloud

Dreams That Glitter – Our Story
- Front cover
- Author: Girls Aloud
- Language: English
- Genre: Autobiography
- Publisher: Bantam Press; Transworld
- Publication date: 9 October 2008
- Publication place: United Kingdom
- Media type: Print (hardcover)
- Pages: 256
- ISBN: 978-0-593-06122-0

Dreams That Glitter – Our Story is the autobiography of English-Irish pop group Girls Aloud, which was published in October 2008. The book was written with a ghostwriter and published by the Transworld imprint Bantam Press.

The autobiography was announced through Girls Aloud's official website on 8 April 2008.Dreams That Glitter features unseen photographs. The 256-page book also includes an insight into their personal lives, their success with Girls Aloud, style tips, and "everything we've learned about life, love and music."

The title Dreams That Glitter is a line from their 2007 single "Call the Shots". The book became a best-seller, and as of June 2009, had been released in paperback format. Girls Aloud held a book signing at Waterstones in Piccadilly, London on 9 October.
