= Love Machine (Girls Aloud song) =

2004 single by Girls Aloud

Single by Girls Aloud

from the album What Will the Neighbours Say?
- B-side: "Androgynous Girls"
- Released: 13 September 2004
- Recorded: 2004
- Genre: Pop rock; rockabilly; skiffle; teen pop
- Length: 3:27
- Label: Polydor
- Songwriters: Miranda Cooper; Brian Higgins; Tim Powell; Nick Coler; Lisa Cowling; Myra Boyle; Shawn Lee
- Producers: Brian Higgins; Xenomania

Girls Aloud singles chronology
"The Show" (2004)	"Love Machine" (2004)	"I'll Stand by You" (2004)

Music video
- "Love Machine" on YouTube

"Love Machine" is a song recorded by British girl group Girls Aloud from their second studio album, What Will the Neighbours Say? (2004). It was released by Polydor Records on 13 September 2004, as the second single from the album. The song was written by Miranda Cooper, Brian Higgins, Tim Powell, Nick Coler, Lisa Cowling, Myra Boyle, and Shawn Lee. The instrumentation was inspired by the Smiths, and created by Powell and Coler. "Love Machine" is an uptempo pop rock song with elements of 1980s synth-pop. The single was received favourably by contemporary music critics, who deemed it a joyful track that was different from the single releases by other artists at the time. According to research carried out for Nokia in 2006, "Love Machine" is the second "most exhilarating" song ever.

"Love Machine" debuted and peaked at number 2 on the UK Singles Chart, continuing the band's string of hits by becoming their sixth consecutive single to chart within the top three. The song also peaked inside the top ten in Europe and Ireland. The accompanying music video was directed by Stuart Gosling, and portrays the five members in a nightclub/restaurant scene dancing and sipping champagne whilst singing their song. Girls Aloud performed "Love Machine" on all of their tours and on several live appearances, including at Disney Channel Kids Awards, TMF Awards 2005, and at The Girls Aloud Party TV special in 2008.

== Background and release ==
Following a brief hiatus, Polydor Records enlisted Brian Higgins and Xenomania to produce Girls Aloud's second album in its entirety, following the success of their debut album Sound of the Underground. Higgins explained that Polydor were not going to continue with the group's contract unless he produced songs for the album. He continued, saying that his initial reaction was that he thought he would only be required to produce a couple of songs, but Polydor insisted that he produce the album in its entirety and that they thought only he understood what they wanted. The album was recorded from April to September 2004, although its lead single "The Show" was released in June 2004. Band member Nicola Roberts said that "Love Machine" was recorded in 18 parts over three days, and also revealed that the band initially was in disagreement with Polydor regarding its release as a single, with Sarah Harding adding that all the girls wanted to release "Deadlines & Diets" instead. Kimberley Walsh and Nadine Coyle in particular voiced their disapproval of the single release, Coyle stating it would be "career suicide" and that she thought the group would be known as laughing stocks if the song came out.

However, despite an "embarrassing" meeting between the label and the girls, "Love Machine" was picked as the second single from What Will the Neighbours Say?, being released on 13 September 2004. "The pressure to come up with singles was, as always, immense. But [...] we were able to have a lot of fun working on ideas that were maybe a little too odd to be on the radio," Higgins said. It was released on three different CD single formats, as well as an additional 7" picture disc, making it Girls Aloud's first single available on vinyl. The first disc included a Flip & Fill remix of "The Show". For the sleeve of the second CD, Artwork design group Form invented five fake magazines, one for each member, and used "Love Machine" lyrics as the headlines. The disc included an exclusive previously unreleased b-side entitled "Androgynous Girls", which had been initially considered to be released as the lead single of the album. The Gravitas Disco Mix of "Love Machine" was also included. The maxi-CD also included a task-based game, created by design agency Holler. The 7" picture disc included the radio edit and Tony Lamezma Remix of "Love Machine".

Cheryl Cole later stated that despite her initially hating the song, that the success of the single taught the group that they were not always right regarding single decisions and that they needed to listen to their label from time to time.

== Composition ==
Girls Aloud – Love Machine
A 21-second sample of "Love Machine"'s chorus verse, where the band sings "nonsense lyrics" over a pop rock background.

"Love Machine" was written by Miranda Cooper, Brian Higgins, Tim Powell, Nick Coler, Lisa Cowling, Myra Boyle, Shawn Lee. They came up with some of the song's lyrics by singing "nonsense lyrics" over a backing track, which eventually evolved into real songwords. The instrumentation track was inspired by the Smiths, and created by Powell and Coler. It is written in G Major with a time signature in common time and a tempo of 121 beats per minute. The vocal range from the band members spans from F_{3} to B_{4}. An early demo of "Love Machine" was included on the compilation album Popjustice: 100% Solid Pop Music, and later on an official Girls Aloud singles boxset; this version was sung by Cole, Nadine Coyle and Sarah Harding only, and featured radically different lyrics from the released version, even excluding the phrase "Love Machine". One of the song's lyrics, "What will the neighbours say / This time?" inspired the album's title, and it is a reference to Girls Aloud's debut single, where Cole sings, "Neighbour's banging on the bathroom wall / He's saying 'Crank the bass, I gotta get some more'". MusicOMH contributor John Murphy noted the track uses "a guitar line that sounds like it's been nicked from an old rockabilly tune", and compared its composition to other "'80s synth pop songs."

== Critical reception ==
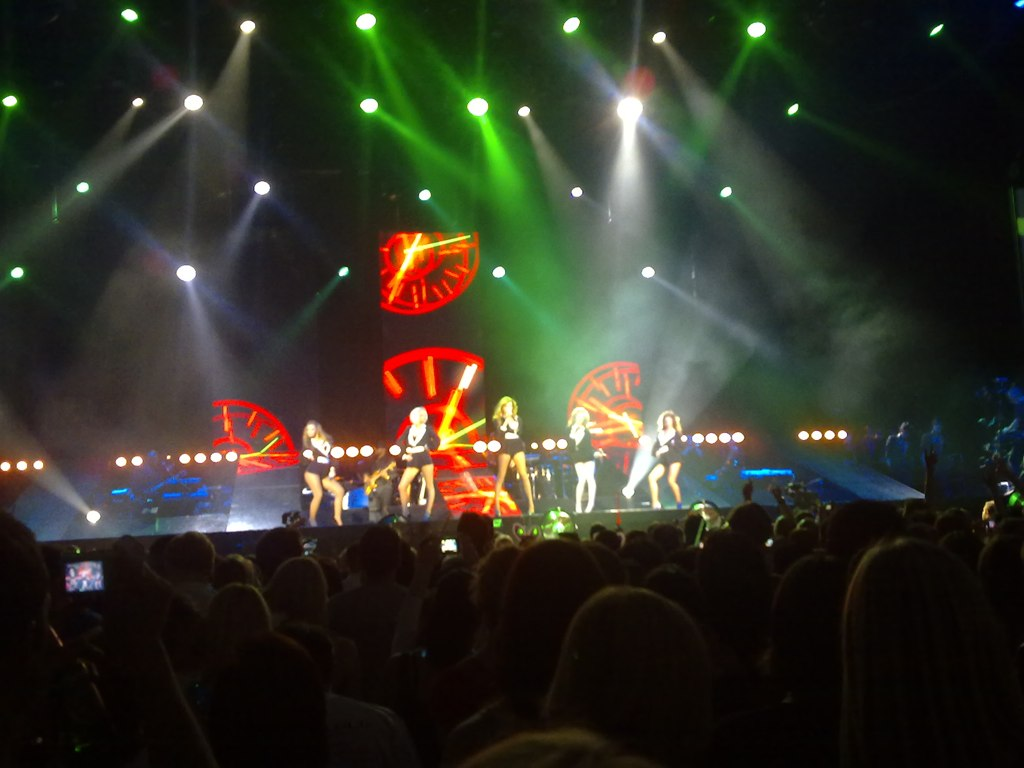
Girls Aloud performing "Love Machine" on the Out of Control Tour (2009).

The track received generally favourable reviews from music critics. Alexis Petridis of The Guardian considered "The Show" and "Love Machine" as the "perfect examples of Xenomania's uniquely rousing approach to pop," adding that the latter "sounds, incredibly, like the Smiths' Rusholme Ruffians colliding head-on with that band's musical nemesis, chirpy 1980s synth-pop." A reviewer for Virgin Media stated the song's "bouncy drums, perky guitars and ditsy lyrics will probably cause a seizure," and commented further, saying that "it sounds so unlike anything else in the charts right now...proving once again that they're still one of the most exciting bands in pop right now." The song was a Track Pick from the Allmusic review of What Will the Neighbours Say? by Sharon Mawer, while Robert Copsey of Digital Spy stated that, despite having many previous releases, it wasn't until "Love Machine", "a swinging, big band track with ludicrous lyrics – that they were thrust into the wider public consciousness." A BBC Music critic, however, called it "upbeat but not particularly tuneful". According to research carried out for Nokia in 2006, "Love Machine" is the second "most exhilarating" song ever, after "Song 2" by Blur.

Billboard named the song #65 on their list of 100 Greatest Girl Group Songs of All Time.

== Commercial performance ==
On the week ending 2 October 2004, "Love Machine" debuted at number 2 on the UK Singles Chart, being held of the top spot by "Call on Me" by Eric Prydz. It stayed at the same position the following week, before falling to number 8. The song also reached number six on the UK Downloads Chart, and eventually became the band's 7th best-selling single in the UK. "Love Machine" also debuted and peaked at number 8 on the European Hot 100 Singles, staying on the top ten for two weeks. In Ireland, the song debuted at number nine on 16 September 2004, and remained at the same position for three weeks, becoming Girls Aloud's first single to fail to enter the top five. It spent one last week in the top ten at number ten. "Love Machine" also entered the Dutch chart Single Top 100 on 14 May 2005 at number 52, before falling of the chart after 4 weeks.

== Music video ==
The accompanying music video for "Love Machine" was directed by Stuart Gosling for Image Dynamic Pictures, and filmed at the Titanic restaurant on London's Brewer Street. Gosling shot the project on 35mm film to give it the desired sleek, stylised, polished and glossy look. Girls Aloud members stopped in at Camden Post to view the footage and were impressed with the final results. The video depicts a nightclub/restaurant scene with the five women dancing and sipping champagne at the location whilst singing their pop number. A caption at the start of the video identifies the location as "The Eskimo Club", which explains the otherwise meaningless song lyrics "Let's go eskimo".

== Live performances ==
"Love Machine" was promoted through several live performances, including at the Disney Channel Kids Awards on 16 September 2004, and at the Smash Hits Poll Winners Party in 2004. They also performed it at the Carling Academy London on 10 February 2005, and at the TMF Awards 2005 in Belgium. The same year, Girls Aloud went on their debut tour, the What Will the Neighbours Say...? Tour, where they performed "Love Machine" in schoolgirl uniforms. For 2006's Chemistry Tour, there was an interlude where the group danced to "1 Thing" by Amerie. There was a similar interlude during 2007's The Greatest Hits Tour, where a big band breakdown was included. Also in 2007, the song was performed at the T4 on the Beach special. "Love Machine" was performed on 2008's Tangled Up Tour, where the band members wore cabaret inspired costumes. Later that year, the band performed it at The Girls Aloud Party TV special held by ITV1, and at the V Festival. For 2009's Out of Control Tour, the song was given a brassier, retro arrangement and included a dance break. On 14 December 2012, the band appeared on BBC Radio 1's Live Lounge, performing the song to promote their greatest hits album Ten, and also at The Graham Norton Show the same day. To further promote the greatest hits, "Love Machine" was also included on a promotional megamix. In 2013, the song was performed during the Ten: The Hits Tour. English indie rock band Arctic Monkeys covered the song on BBC Radio 1's Live Lounge.

== Formats and track listings ==
These are the formats and track listings of major single releases of "Love Machine".

- CD single – Part 1
1. "Love Machine" – 3:25
2. "The Show" (Flip & Fill Remix) – 5:35
- CD single – Part 2
1. "Love Machine" – 3:25
2. "Love Machine" (Gravitas Disco Mix) – 7:30
3. "Androgynous Girls" (Cooper, Higgins, Powell, Coler, Cowling, Lee) – 4:39
4. "Love Machine" (video) – 3:39
5. "Love Machine" (karaoke video) – 3:39
6. "Love Machine" (game) – 3:39
- 7" Vinyl
1. "Love Machine" – 3:25
2. "Love Machine" (Tony Lamezma Mix) – 6:15
- The Singles Boxset
1. "Love Machine" – 3:25
2. "The Show" (Flip & Fill Remix) – 5:35
3. "Love Machine" (Gravitas Disco Mix) – 7:30
4. "Androgynous Girls" – 4:39
5. "Love Machine" (Tony Lamezma Mix) – 6:15
6. "Love Machine" (video) – 3:39
7. "Love Machine" (karaoke video) – 3:39
8. "Love Machine" (game) – 3:39
- Digital EP
1. "Love Machine" – 3:26
2. "Love Machine" (Gravitas "Disco" Mix) – 7:28
3. "Androgynous Girls" – 4:48
4. "Love Machine" (Tony Lamezma's Full Length Club Mix) – 6:19

== Personnel ==
- Nadine Coyle – co-lead vocals
- Cheryl Tweedy – co-lead vocals
- Sarah Harding – co-lead vocals
- Nicola Roberts – co-lead vocals
- Kimberley Walsh – co-lead vocals

== Charts ==
=== Weekly charts ===
Chart (2004–2005)	Peak position
Europe (European Hot 100 Singles)	8
Ireland (IRMA)	9
Netherlands (Single Top 100)	52
Romania (Romanian Top 100)	50
Scotland Singles (OCC)	2
UK Singles (OCC)	2
UK Airplay (Music Week)	36

=== Year-end charts ===
Chart (2004)	Position
UK Singles (OCC)	49

== Certifications ==
Region	Certification	Certified units/sales
United Kingdom (BPI)	Platinum	694,000

== See also ==
- List of UK top-ten singles in 2004
- List of Platinum singles in the United Kingdom awarded since 2000
