= Miranda Cooper =

English songwriter and singer

- Born: 1975 (age 50–51)
- Origin: England
- Occupations: Songwriter, singer, record producer
- Years active: 1996–present

Miranda Cooper (born 1975) is an English songwriter and singer best known for her work as a member of the songwriting and production team Xenomania, founded by Brian Higgins. She has co-written songs for artists including Sugababes, Girls Aloud, Kylie Minogue, Pet Shop Boys, Alesha Dixon and The Saturdays. She has co-written four UK number-one singles: "Round Round", "Hole in the Head", "Sound of the Underground" and "The Promise", and has had over 30 top 10 UK hits. In October 2026, Miranda won the Music Creative: Spirit of the Studio award at the Music Week Women in Music Awards, recognising her multiple decades of contribution to music creation.

== Early life and career ==
Cooper began her career as a dancer and later worked in television presenting for the Disney Channel and Nickelodeon. In the mid-1990s, she was part of the pop duo T-Shirt, who released a cover of "You Sexy Thing", which reached number six on the Australian charts.

== Songwriting and Xenomania ==
In 1997, Cooper began working with Brian Higgins and became a founding member of Xenomania, a UK songwriting and production collective.

She co-wrote several Sugababes singles including "Round Round", "Hole in the Head", "In the Middle" and "Red Dress". "Round Round" reached number one on the UK Singles Chart in 2002.

Cooper also co-wrote Girls Aloud's debut single "Sound of the Underground", which became the UK Christmas number one in 2002 and spent four weeks at number one.

She went on to co-write all of Girls Aloud's singles up to their hiatus in 2009, including "The Promise", which won Best British Single at the 2009 BRIT Awards.

She has also written for Kylie Minogue, Pet Shop Boys, Alesha Dixon and The Saturdays. Cooper co-wrote "Sweet About Me" for Australian singer Gabriella Cilmi, released in March 2008. The song reached number six on the UK Singles Chart and topped the Australian ARIA Singles Chart for five weeks.

== Musical theatre ==
Cooper co-wrote the stage adaptation of Billionaire Boy, based on the novel by David Walliams. The production won Best Show for Children and Young People at the 2019 UK Theatre Awards.

She also co-wrote the music and lyrics to Fantastically Great Women Who Changed the World, which won Best Show for Children and Young People at the 2022 UK Theatre Awards.

In April 2026, it was announced that Cooper would write the music and lyrics for a stage musical adaptation of Fighting with My Family, the 2019 film written and directed by Stephen Merchant, with a book and lyrics by Jon Brittain and additional music by Nick Coler.

== Recent work ==
In 2026, Cooper co-wrote Jessie Ware's lead single "I Could Get Used To This" from her album Super Bloom.

She also co-wrote "John Hughes Movie" for Maisie Peters, from Peters' debut album You Signed Up for This (2021).

== Other roles ==
In 2025, Cooper was appointed President of The F-List, a UK organisation supporting female and gender-diverse musicians.

Cooper is also co-founder of Tilted Musicals, a production company focused on developing original musical theatre.

== Selected songwriting credits ==
- "Round Round" – Sugababes
- "Hole in the Head" – Sugababes
- "Sound of the Underground" – Girls Aloud
- "The Promise" – Girls Aloud
- "Sweet About Me" – Gabriella Cilmi
- "All Fired Up" – The Saturdays
- "John Hughes Movie" – Maisie Peters
- "I Could Get Used To This" – Jessie Ware
- "Giving You Up" – Kylie Minogue
- "Love Etc." – Pet Shop Boys
