= Brian Higgins (producer) =

English record producer (born 1966)

Brian Thomas Higgins (born November 4, 1966) is a British record producer and songwriter who has written and produced albums and tracks for several successful pop music singers and groups, including Girls Aloud, S Club 7, Sugababes, and the Saturdays, through his Xenomania production team. Miranda Cooper is a key collaborator who has co-writing credits in nearly all Xenomania-created tracks.

His musical style has been described as part electro, part power pop, part basic pop, with elements of new wave, rave and dance found in many of his collaborations.

== Early career ==
Higgins hails from Whitehaven, Cumbria, on the edge of the Lake District of England. He is the second of five children. His father was a general practitioner. Influenced by the band ®tm (Registered Trade Mark) in the early 1980s, he played keyboards in a band called Despatch, which included former members of ®tm.

In the late 1980s, he moved to East Grinstead, West Sussex. With fellow Cumbrian and guitarist Dave Colquhoun, he formed a band named Anything You Want, which also featured Mark Scott. Dave Colquhoun soon left the band and now plays guitar with Rick Wakeman of Yes fame. Scott and Higgins continued and had one release with Profile Records. Scott introduced Higgins to Steve Rodway (also known as Motiv8), who took on Higgins as a session musician. Higgins then co-wrote and co-produced the successful 1997 song "All I Wanna Do" for Dannii Minogue. Two of his collaborators on the single, Tim Powell and Matt Gray, became important future members of Xenomania.

Higgins' involvement in "All I Wanna Do" led to an opportunity to co-write a song for Cher. It led to the international number-one hit "Believe", released in 1998. Again, Powell and Gray were among his collaborators.

He said his sometimes wide musical tastes growing up, from punk rock groups like the Buzzcocks and the Sex Pistols, to electronic groups like Depeche Mode and New Order, have informed his musical style as the main producer behind Xenomania. He added, "It's natural for me to look for combinations of both in the music Xenomania creates."

== Xenomania ==
In 2000, Higgins and Gray produced a single for London Records with the singer Miranda Cooper (a.k.a. Moonbaby). Although the song did not become a hit, Cooper's lyric writing talent would become a key part of Xenomania.

Complications resulted from the late nineties sale of London Records to Universal Music Group. Eventually, Xenomania became an independent production company based in Kent where Higgins, Cooper, and the rest of the Xenomania production team currently reside.

"He thinks everyone's got at least one number one hit in them", says Cooper, his long-time writing partner, in a 2004 Observer Music Monthly article. Higgins clarified, "Music is a fundamental human need. Well, maybe not as necessary as water, but there's a natural tendency towards melody and rhythm in everybody. It's just a question of bringing it out."

In 2016, Higgins founded Twin Xenomania Ltd. with Nick Gatfield. Music released under the label included songs by Liv Lovelle.

== Collaborations ==
Artists that Higgins has produced and/or written with/for include Pet Shop Boys, Sugababes, Dannii Minogue, the Saturdays, Girls Aloud, Sophie Ellis-Bextor, Kylie Minogue, Bananarama, Alesha Dixon, Texas, Rachel Stevens, Gabriella Cilmi, Mollie King, Nadine Coyle, Vanilla (group), Kaiser Chiefs, and Saint Etienne among others.

Higgins said of Sugababes member Mutya Buena, "She's undoubtedly the finest female singer this country has produced in years – for me the closest comparison is Dusty Springfield."

== Sources ==
1. Mark Savage (May 2005). "The Hitmakers: Xenomania". BBC News Online.
2. Elisabeth Vincintelli (August 2005). "Originality, Inc. – The Songwriting Factories of Europe". Slate Music Box.
3. Alexis Petridis (May 2004). "Girls Aloud, What Will The Neighbours Say?". The Guardian.
