= JP Cooper discography =

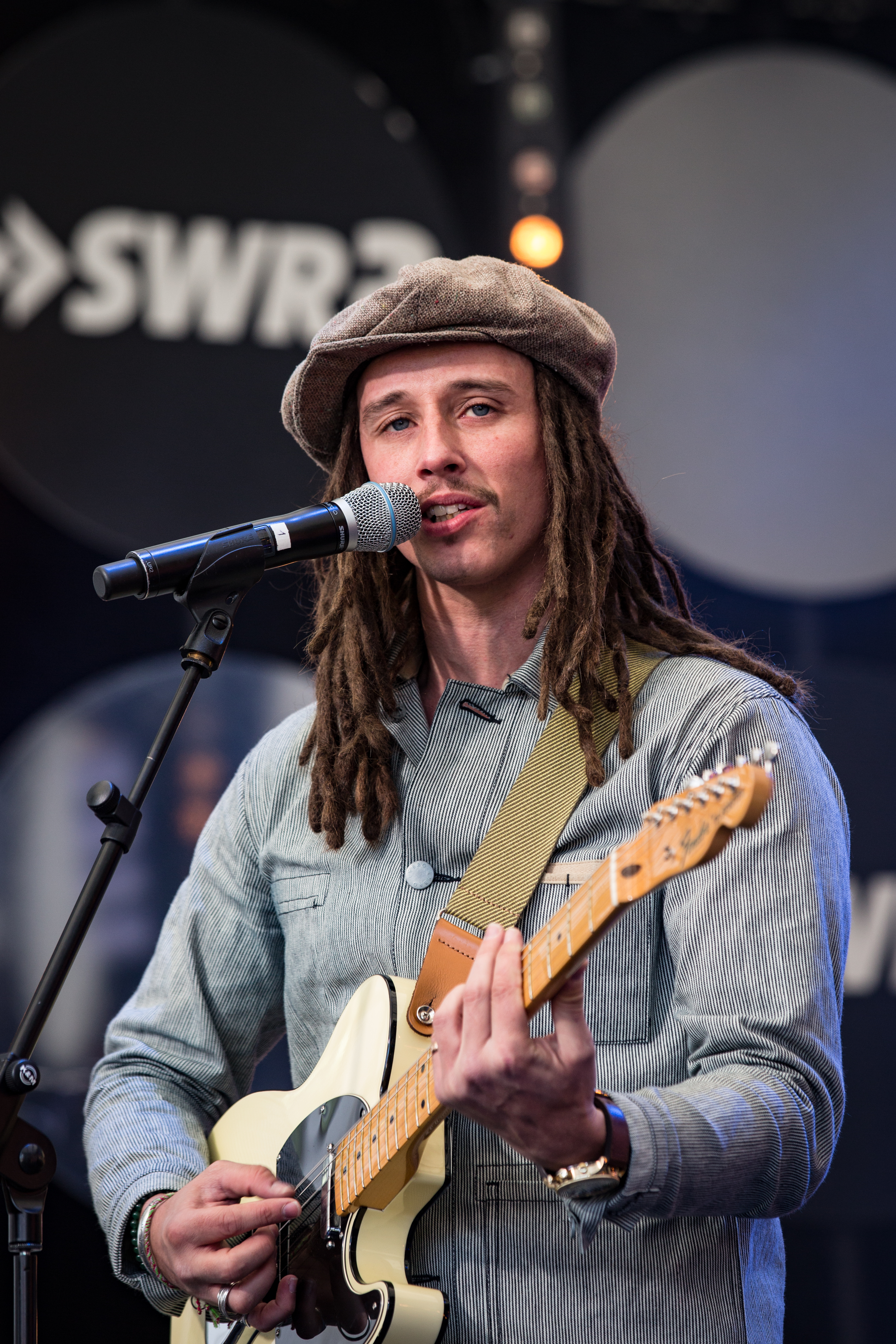
- Studio albums: 3
- EPs: 7
- Singles: 23

The discography of JP Cooper, an English singer and songwriter. His debut studio album, Raised Under Grey Skies, was released in October 2017 and peaked at number nine on the UK Albums Chart. The album spawned seven singles, most notably "September Song", which peaked at number seven on the UK Singles Chart.

== Studio albums ==
Title	Details	Peak chart positions					Certifications
Title	Details	UK	BEL (FL)	IRE	NLD	SWI	Certifications
Raised Under Grey Skies	Released: 6 October 2017; Label: Island; Formats: Digital download, CD	9	41	21	40	53	BPI: Gold
She	Released: 18 February 2022; Label: Island; Formats: Digital download, CD	66	—	—	—	—	
Just a Few Folk	Released: 13 February 2026; Label: Island; Formats: Digital download, CD	—	—	—	—	—	
"—" denotes a title that did not chart, or was not released in that territory.

== Extended plays ==
Title	Details
EP1	Released: 27 June 2012; Label: Self-released; Format: Digital download
EP2	Released: 27 June 2012; Label: Self-released; Format: Digital download
EP3	Released: 8 February 2013; Label: Self-released; Format: Digital download
Keep the Quiet Out	Released: 20 July 2014; Label: Island Records; Format: Digital download
When the Darkness Comes	Released: 26 January 2015; Label: Island Records; Format: Digital download
Too Close	Released: 26 June 2020; Label: Island Records; Format: Digital download
Love	Released: 12 February 2021; Label: UMG Recordings; Format: Digital download

== Singles ==
=== As lead artist ===
Title	Year	Peak chart positions										Certifications	Album
Title	Year	UK	AUS	AUT	BEL (Fl)	DEN	GER	IRE	NLD	SWE	SWI	Certifications	Album
"Five More Days" (featuring Avelino)	2016	—	—	—	—	—	—	—	—	—	—		Non-album single
"Party"	2016	—	—	—	—	—	—	—	—	—	—		Raised Under Grey Skies
"September Song"	2016	7	99	42	17	20	40	7	16	16	29	BPI: 3× Platinum; BEA: Gold; BVMI: Gold; FIMI: Platinum; GLF: Platinum; IFPI DEN: Platinum; MC: Gold	Raised Under Grey Skies
"Passport Home"	2017	86	—	—	—	—	—	—	—	—	—	BPI: Silver	Raised Under Grey Skies
"She's on My Mind"	2017	93	—	—	59	—	—	—	—	—	—	BPI: Silver; FIMI: Platinum	Raised Under Grey Skies
"Wait"	2017	—	—	—	—	—	—	—	—	—	—		Raised Under Grey Skies
"Momma's Prayers" (featuring Stormzy)	2017	—	—	—	—	—	—	—	—	—	—		Raised Under Grey Skies
"Dancing" (with Friction)	2018	—	—	—	—	—	—	—	—	—	—		Connections
"All This Love" (featuring Mali-Koa)	2018	—	—	—	—	—	—	—	—	—	—		Raised Under Grey Skies
"Cheerleader"	2018	—	—	—	—	—	—	—	—	—	—		Love
"Sing It with Me" (with Astrid S)	2019	—	—	—	53	—	—	—	—	76	—	BPI: Silver	Love
"Losing Me" (with Gabrielle Aplin)	2019	—	—	—	—	—	—	—	—	—	—		Dear Happy
"The Reason Why" (with Stefflon Don and Banx & Ranx)	2019	—	—	—	—	—	—	—	—	—	—		Non-album single
"In These Arms"	2020	—	—	—	—	—	—	—	—	—	—		Too Close (Note: "Bits and Pieces" and "Too Close" also appear on the album She.)
"Bits and Pieces"	2020	—	—	—	—	—	—	—	—	—	—		Too Close
"Little Bit of Love"	2020	—	—	—	—	—	—	—	—	—	—		Too Close
"Too Close"	2020	—	—	—	—	—	—	—	—	—	—		Too Close
"Is It Just Me?" (with Emily Burns)	2020	— (Note: "Is It Just Me?" did not enter the UK Singles Chart, but peaked at number 82 on the UK Singles Downloads Chart.)	—	—	—	—	—	—	—	—	—		Non-album single
"Holy Water"	2021	—	—	—	—	—	—	—	—	—	—		She
"If the World Should Ever Stop"	2021	—	—	—	—	—	—	—	—	—	—		She
"Call My Name"	2021	—	—	—	—	—	—	—	—	—	—		She
"Runaway" (with R3hab and Sigala)	2021	—	—	—	—	—	—	—	—	— (Note: "Runaway" did not enter the Swedish Singles Chart, but peaked at number 14 on the Swedish Heatseeker chart.)	―		Non-album single
"We Cry"	2021	—	—	—	—	—	—	—	—	—	—		She
"Need You Tonight" (featuring Ray BLK)	2022	—	—	—	—	—	—	—	—	—	—		She
"Fire" (with Banx & Ranx)	2022	—	—	—	—	—	—	—	—	—	—		Non-album single
"Waiting on a Blue Sky"	2024	—	—	—	—	—	—	—	—	—	—		Just a Few Folk
"Diamonds and Gold"	2024	—	—	—	—	—	—	—	—	—	—		Just a Few Folk
"Talking to Strangers"	2025	—	—	—	—	—	—	—	—	—	—		Non-album singles
"Walking on Sunshine"	2025	—	—	—	—	—	—	—	—	—	—		Non-album singles
"Summer of Love"	2025	—	—	—	—	—	—	—	—	—	—		Just a Few Folk
"Nothing Ever Changes"	2025	—	—	—	—	—	—	—	—	—	—		Just a Few Folk
"Sad Song" (featuring Gabrielle)	2025	36	—	—	—	—	—	—	—	—	—		Just a Few Folk
"—" denotes a title that did not chart, or was not released in that territory.

=== As featured artist ===
Title	Year	Peak chart positions										Certifications	Album
Title	Year	UK	AUS	AUT	BEL (Fl)	DEN	GER	IRE	NLD	SWE	SWI	Certifications	Album
"The Artist Inside" (Don Diablo featuring JP Cooper)	2012	—	—	—	—	—	—	—	—	—	—		Non-album singles
"Shivers" (SG Lewis featuring JP Cooper)	2015	—	—	—	—	—	—	—	—	—	—		Non-album singles
"Perfect Strangers" (Jonas Blue featuring JP Cooper)	2016	2	6	9	4	11	9	2	3	3	8	BPI: 2× Platinum; ARIA: 5× Platinum; BVMI: Platinum; FIMI: 3× Platinum; RIAA: Gold	Blue
"We Were Young" (Petit Biscuit featuring JP Cooper)	2019	—	—	—	—	—	—	—	—	—			Non-album single
"—" denotes a title that did not chart, or was not released in that territory.

=== Promotional singles ===
Title	Year	Peak chart positions	Album
Title	Year	BEL (Fl)	Album
"Closer"	2014	113	When the Darkness Comes

== Other charted and certified songs ==
Title	Year	Peak chart positions	Certifications	Album
Title	Year	SWE	Certifications	Album
"Birthday"	2017	46		Fifty Shades Darker
"Ordinary People" (Bugzy Malone featuring JP Cooper)	2018	—	BPI: Silver	B. Inspired

== Guest appearances ==
Title	Year	Other artist(s)	Album
"Carry You Home"	2014	Jake Isaac	War Child – EP
"Oceans"	2014	iLL BLU	The BLU Oceans Project – EP
"Get Involved"	2018	Craig David	The Time Is Now
"One Last Song"	2018	Gorgon City, Yungen	Escape
"Ordinary People"	2018	Bugzy Malone	B. Inspired
