= Nadine (EP) =

EP by Nadine Coyle
- Released: 22 March 2018
- Genre: Dance-pop
- Length: 14:26
- Label: Virgin EMI
- Producer: Xenomania; Commands

Nadine Coyle chronology
Insatiable (2010)	Nadine (2018)	Fool For Love (2019)

Nadine is the first extended play (EP) by Irish singer Nadine Coyle, released on 22 March 2018 by Virgin EMI Records. After reuniting with Brian Higgins from production team Xenomania, new music from Nadine began development in 2014.

== Background and development ==
In November 2010, Coyle released her debut studio album, Insatiable. Coyle collaborated with producers such as Toby Gad, Guy Chambers and William Orbit. Upon its release, the album received generally mixed to unfavourable reviews from music critics, and was met with limited commercial success due to an exclusive distribution through Tesco stores.

Wanting to release a potential follow-up record, Coyle announced that she and Brian Higgins of Xenomania had begun working on new material in 2014. In the following year, she confirmed that she was recording the album and that it would be released the same year, but production was halted and the album was never completed.

In July 2017, it was announced that Coyle had signed a recording deal with Virgin EMI Records, through which the EP was released.

== Promotion ==
Prior to its release, Coyle had released a non-album single titled "Go to Work", which peaked at number 57 on the UK Downloads Chart and number 52 in Scotland.

Nadine was announced on 5 February 2018, and its tracks were released bi-weekly leading up to its release date. In promotion of the EP, a concert tour consisting of seven dates was announced on the same day, but was later cancelled.

== Critical reception ==
Lauren O'Neill of Noisey UK described the EP as "unabashed British pop" and has kept a "formula of relative timelessness" comparable to that of Girls Aloud's.

== Track listing ==
All tracks produced by Xenomania and Commands.

No.	Title	Writer(s)	Length
1.	"Girls on Fire"	Nadine Coyle; Georgia Morgan; Lauren Morgan; Brian Higgins; Benjamin Taylor; Sarah Thompson; Keir MacCulloch; Kyle Mackenzie	3:35
2.	"Gossip"	Coyle; Takura Tendayi; Higgins; Luke Fitton; Thompson; MacCulloch; Mackenzie	4:16
3.	"September Song" (cover of the JP Cooper song)	John Paul Cooper; Benjamin McIldowie; Jon Cobbe Hume	3:31
4.	"Something in Your Bones"	Jolan Gidney-Craigen; Higgins; Taylor; Thompson; MacCulloch; Mackenzie	3:04
Total length:			14:26

== Personnel ==
- Nadine Coyle – lead vocals, background vocals
- Xenomania – production
- COMMANDS – production

== Release history ==
Region	Release date	Format	Label	Ref.
Worldwide	23 March 2018	Digital download	Virgin EMI	
