= Teemu Brunila =

Finnish musician (born 1976)

- Born: November 24, 1976 (age 49); Turku
- Origin: Finland
- Occupations: Singer, songwriter, and producer

Teemu William Brunila (born 24 November 1976, in Turku) is a Finnish singer, songwriter, musician and producer. Brunila became known as the lead vocalist and songwriter for the pop group The Crash. During their career, the band released four studio albums and one compilation album.

== Later career ==
After The Crash disbanded, Brunila has concentrated on writing music for other Finnish artists, including Anna Abreu, Saara and Jenni Vartiainen. He has also written songs for British acts like Pixie Lott and JLS and American R&B artist Trey Songz. When a song "Never Again" was featured on Songz's album Chapter V, Brunila became the first Finn to have co-written a song for an album at the top of the Billboard 200 album chart.

== Studio Killers ==
In 2011 a new virtual band Studio Killers started to gain success with their single "Ode to the Bouncer" and was said to have members from Finland, Denmark, and the United Kingdom. The group has never disclosed the identities of its members, but Brunila has been hypothesized to be the voice of the band's singer, Cherry.

== Personal life ==
Teemu Brunila is a graduate of the University of Turku, majoring in law. He has stated, however, that he has no intentions to start practicing law.

== Selected discography ==
=== Studio albums by The Crash ===
Year	Album	Peak Position
Year	Album	FIN
1999	Comfort Deluxe	26
2001	Wildlife	3
2003	Melodrama	2
2005	Selected Songs 1999–2005	10
2006	Pony Ride	2

=== Songwriting and production credits ===
Title	Year	Artist(s)	Album	Credits	Written with	Produced with
"Catching Snowflakes"	2010	Pixie Lott	Turn It Up Louder	Co-writer	Victoria Lott	–
"The Last Song"	2010	JLS	Outta This World	Co-writer	Aston Merrygold, Marvin Humes, Oritse Williams, Jonathan Gill, Fredrick Ball	–
"Innocence"	2011	JLS	Jukebox	Co-writer	Aston Merrygold, Marvin Humes, Oritse Williams, Jonathan Gill, Fredrick Ball	–
"Never Again"	2012	Trey Songz	Chapter V	Co-writer	Tremaine Neverson, James Abrahart, Curtis Mayfield, Matthew Prime	–
"Twilight"	2013	Sub Focus	Torus	Co-writer	Nicholas Douwma	–
"Feels Like Coming Home"	2014	Jetta	Feels Like Coming Home EP	Co-writer	Jetta John-Harley, Rickard Goransson, Justin Franks	–
"I'll Keep Loving You" (featuring Birdy & Jaymes Young)	2014	David Guetta	Listen	Co-writer	Pierre Guetta, Frederik Riesterer, Giorgio Tuinfort, Jaymes McFarland, Jasmine van den Bogaerde, Matthew Dragstrem	–
"Here It Is" (featuring Chris Brown)	2015	Flo Rida	My House EP	Co-writer	Tramar Dillard, Alexander Izquerdio, Justin Franks, Gary Hill, Josh Abraham, Oliver Goldstein, Thomas Troelsen	–
"That's What I Like" (featuring Fitz)	2015	Flo Rida	My House EP	Co-writer/Producer	Tramar Dillard, Breyan Isaac, Frederick Hibbert, Jamie Sanderson, Jimmy Marinos, Mike Skill, Thomas Troelsen, Marcos Palacios, Ernest Clark, Vincent "Vinny" Venditto, Wally Palamarchuk	Sermstyle, Vinny, Axident, Anton Ben-Horin, Ben Maddahi, Miles Beard, JP Negrete, Gladieux
"Last Party"	2015	Mika	No Place in Heaven	Co-writer	Michael Penniman Jr., Matthew Hales	–
"Porcelain"	2015	Mika	No Place in Heaven	Co-writer/Producer	Michael Penniman Jr., Jori Sjoroos, Joseph Khajadourian, Alex Schwartz	Mika
"Bring Me to Life" (featuring Milly Pye)	2015	MK	Non-album single	Co-writer	Marc Kinchen, Mark Batson, Milly Pye	–
"Party"	2016	JP Cooper	Raised Under Grey Skies	Co-writer/Producer	John Cooper	–
"Hehkuu"	2016	JVG	Non-album single	Co-writer/Producer	Jare and VilleGalle, Antti Riihimäki	–
"Too Many People"	2016	Milly Pye	Non-album single	Co-writer/Producer	Milly Pye, Hank Solo	Hank Solo
"September Song"	2016	JP Cooper	Raised Under Grey Skies	Co-writer/Producer	John Cooper, Benjamin McIldowie, Jonathan Hume	Mike Spencer
"Birthday"	2017	JP Cooper	Fifty Shades Darker: OST	Co-writer/Producer	John Cooper	–
"She's on My Mind"	2017	JP Cooper	Raised Under Grey Skies	Co-writer/Additional producer	John Cooper, Benjamin McIldowie, Jonathan Hume	Mike Spencer, Jon Hume
"Wait"	2017	JP Cooper	Raised Under Grey Skies	Producer	–	Hank Solo
"All This Love" (featuring Mali-Koa Hood)	2017	JP Cooper	Raised Under Grey Skies	Co-writer/Producer	John Cooper	–
"The Only Reason"	2017	JP Cooper	Raised Under Grey Skies	Producer	–	–
"Change"	2017	JP Cooper	Raised Under Grey Skies	Producer	–	Hank Solo
"Closer"	2017	JP Cooper	Raised Under Grey Skies	Producer	–	Mike Spencer
"Beneath the Streetlights and the Moon"	2017	JP Cooper	Raised Under Grey Skies	Producer	–	Greg Wells
"In the Silence"	2017	JP Cooper	Raised Under Grey Skies	Co-writer/Producer	John Cooper	–
"Tidal Wave"	2017	JP Cooper	Raised Under Grey Skies	Producer	–	–
"Superpowers"	2017	Saara	Non-album single	Co-writer/Producer	Saara, Hank Solo	–
"Pink Magic"	2019	Yesung	Pink Magic	Co-writer	Jake K, Hailey Collier, Ryan S. Jhun	–
"Magic"	2020	Kylie Minogue	Disco	Co-writer	Kylie Minogue, Michelle Buzz, Daniel Heløy Davidsen, Peter Wallevik	–
"Miss a Thing"	2020	Kylie Minogue	Disco	Co-writer/Producer	Kylie Minogue, Nico Johann "Stadi" Hartikainen, Ally Ahern	Nico Johann "Stadi" Hartikainen
"Real Groove"	2020	Kylie Minogue	Disco	Co-writer/Producer	Kylie Minogue, Nico Johann "Stadi" Hartikainen, Alida Gaprestad	Nico Johann "Stadi" Hartikainen
"Till You Love Somebody"	2020	Kylie Minogue	Disco	Co-writer	Kylie Minogue, Skylar Adams, Linslee Campbell	–
"Manallan Mailla"	2026	Vilma Jää	Control Resonant	Co-writer	Vilma Jää, Jurek Reunamäki	Jurek Reunamäki
