= Insatiable (Nadine Coyle song) =

Single by Nadine Coyle

from the album Insatiable
- B-side: "Enough Is Never Enough"
- Released: 10 September 2010
- Recorded: 2009
- Genre: Pop rock; power pop
- Length: 3:06
- Label: Black Pen
- Songwriters: Nadine Coyle; Guy Chambers
- Producer: Ricci Riccardi

Nadine Coyle singles chronology
"Insatiable" (2010)	"Sweetest High" (2011)

"Insatiable" is the debut solo single by Irish singer Nadine Coyle. Co-written with Guy Chambers and produced by Ricci Riccardi, the song was released as the lead single from Coyle's debut solo album of the same name (2010). The accompanying music video for "Insatiable" was directed by Wayne Isham and features Coyle performing with a live band against various backdrops. It charted in Ireland, Scotland, the UK and charted on the European singles chart.

== Background ==
"Insatiable" was Coyle's first solo single after seven years as a member of BRIT Award-winning girl group Girls Aloud. During the group's hiatus, Coyle announced plans to release a solo album. Nadine worked with a number of famous songwriters and producers, including Guy Chambers. BBC said the song "showcases a harder, guitar-led sound for the pop singer." Nadine revealed the song was intended to sound "sexy."

== Promotion ==
The song received its official world premiere on In:Demand on 10 September. Coyle visited The Scott Mills Show on 15 September, giving the song its BBC Radio 1 premiere. However, Coyle failed to make the Radio 1 playlist, resulting in a lack of airplay. Coyle appeared on Paul O'Grady Live. She also appeared on Daybreak and The Album Chart Show to perform the song. Coyle had declined to perform on The X Factor to promote the single as she claimed it would compromise her vocals, and that she "is only interested in performing live", as the single "is such a big song".

== Critical reception ==
The song has received acclaim from contemporary music critics. Popjustice said it "thunders across the horizon like a furious pop battlehorse. We like this a lot." Heat magazine described it as "very good indeed. And massive. And dramatic. And sing-songy. We love it quite a lot, actually." Digital Spy also praised the song, describing it as "a bombastic synthy pop morsel with more swagger than the hardest lad in the upper sixth." It has been called "ballsy and Eighties-influenced", receiving comparisons to The Bangles. Digital Spy also called the single "a bombastic pop chugger – synthy enough for 2010 but not quite modern-sounding."

In the mid-week charts (released on 3 November 2010) "Insatiable" reached number 35 on the UK Singles Chart, selling 117 physical copies on its first day. The statistics were reported widely in the press, with reports attributing low physical sales to the fact that the CD single was only available in Tesco. On The Official Chart Update on BBC it entered the UK Singles Chart at number 26, dropping out of the top 40 after one week. At the end of its first week, "Insatiable" had sold 11,392 copies – about 500 on CD while the rest were downloads. Coyle dismissed the poor sales of her debut single, saying she was focusing on "the bigger picture", claiming the single is "really, really good" and had been "really embraced". She said that she wanted to "watch costs and stuff in marketing and manufacturing", claiming that "singles aren't really making money any more so it's kind of better to concentrate your efforts on being able to have a big show and get stuff together and spend things wisely and have things that can last and withstand and be around."

== Music video ==
=== Background ===
The music video was directed by Wayne Isham. Wayne Isham said of Nadine, “I loved Nadine’s voice and songs from first listen as well as her focus on authentic performance and a vision as to how she wanted me to work with her. I’m inspired to take this to an even higher level. This girl rocks." Nadine said, "I viewed presentation reels by tons of talented directors, but Wayne's feel for capturing live performance as well as lighting and camera work spoke to me straight away." The video was filmed in Los Angeles starting on 11 September. It was deemed "too sexy" for television and had to be re-edited. It premiered on 3 October.

=== Synthesis ===
The video features Coyle performing in front of black and white backgrounds in a number of outfits. There are also scenes with rain falling behind her. She is accompanied by a live band. Nadine received media attention for her "sexy" looks. daily Ryan Love of Digital Spy said that he was excited for the video, but was ultimately disappointed.

The video has had over 1.6 million views on Nadine's official YouTube channel.

== Track listing ==
- UK digital single
1. "Insatiable" (Coyle, Guy Chambers)
2. "Insatiable" (PjOE & Timka Re-Mix Edit)
3. "Insatiable" (PjOE & Timka Re-Mix Extended)
4. "Enough Is Never Enough" (Demo Version)
- CD single (Only available in Tesco)
1. "Insatiable" (Coyle, Guy Chambers)
2. "Insatiable" (PjOE & Timka Re-Mix Edit)
3. "Insatiable" (PjOE & Timka Re-Mix Extended)

== Chart performance ==
Chart (2010)	Peak position
Ireland (IRMA)	20
Scottish Singles Sales (Official Charts)	23
UK Singles (Official Charts)	26
UK Indie (Official Charts)	3
