= Petit Biscuit =

French-Moroccan DJ and record producer (born 1999)

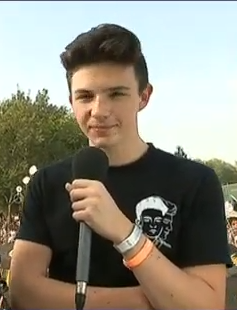
- Petit Biscuit in 2017

Background information
- Born: Mehdi Benjelloun; 10 November 1999 (age 26); Rouen, France
- Genre: Tropical house
- Occupations: DJ, record producer
- Years active: 2015-present
- Labels: Écurie; Inside; Petit Biscuit Music

Mehdi Benjelloun (born 10 November 1999), known by his stage name Petit Biscuit (French pronunciation: [pəti biskɥi]), is a French DJ and music producer.

The 26-year-old French-Moroccan producer is known for his distinctive style, forged through combining acoustic elements, electronic production, and vocal manipulations. The eclecticism of this combination is reflective of his background in the polar spheres of electronica and classical music. He describes his music as a call to travel, deep human reflection, and natural, sensual things.

== Early life ==
Benjelloun was born to a Moroccan father and a French mother.

In July 2017, he graduated from high school with a Baccalauréat Scientifique (high school diploma with a specialty in science) mention très bien (with honors). From September 2017, he started studying at Paris-Dauphine University, and later left the university to focus more on music in March 2018.

Benjelloun learned to play instruments such as piano, cello, bass and guitar, but preferred electro house sounds as he was able to produce "unlimited combinations of music". He wrote his first songs in secret in his room. His early musical interests included electronica and classical music. The name "Petit Biscuit" is said to come from his love of French pastries his grandmother baked.

== Career ==
He released his early works on SoundCloud until he was noticed by distributor Electro Posé, under whom he published "Sunset Lover" on 15 June 2015 as the lead single from his eponymous EP. It received over 62 million views and more than 400 million streams.

"You", "Palms", "Night Trouble", "Midnight Sky" and "Memories" were released as promotional singles on 15 June 2015. He released the single "Oceans" on 22 July 2015. He released his debut eponymous EP, Petit Biscuit on 13 May 2016. Sunset Lover became an international breakthrough hit amassing over 350 million streams.

Petit Biscuit's debut album Presence was released in December 2017 and was described by Earmilk as a "powerful, momentous album". It was Triple J Album of the week in Australia upon release, and features artists Lido, Bipolar Sunshine, and Cautious Clay, along with hits "Waterfall" and "Sunset Lover". He performed at the Victoires de la Musique, Paris – the French equivalent of the Brit Awards – and was nominated for his album, "Presence." To stay independent, he created his own label, "Petit Biscuit Music".

On 15 April 2018, he performed at Coachella for the first time. He has toured multiple countries around the world, including United States, United Kingdom, Netherlands, Mexico and Canada.

At the beginning of 2019, Petit Biscuit released "Wide Awake," which was described by Billboard as a "glitchy bass instrumental", and "We Were Young," featuring JP Cooper, as a "young love daydream".

On October 30, 2020, Petit Biscuit released his second studio album, "Parachute" via Écurie Records.

== Discography ==
=== Albums ===
Title	Details	Peak chart positions		
Title	Details	FRA	BEL (WA)	SWI
Presence	Released: 10 November 2017; Label: Petit Biscuit Music; Format: Digital download, CD	21	35	72
Parachute	Released: 30 October 2020; Label: Écurie; Format: Digital download	—	—	—
Discipline	Released: 28 June 2024; Label: Écurie; Format: Digital download	—	—	—
"—" denotes an album that did not chart or was not released.

=== Compilations ===
Title	Details
We Were Young (The Playlist)	Released: 26 July 2019; Label: Petit Biscuit Music; Format: Digital download

=== Extended plays ===
Title	Details	Peak chart positions
Title	Details	FRA
Petit Biscuit	Released: 13 May 2016; Label: Petit Biscuit Music; Format: Digital download, CD	56
I Leave Again	Released: 7 August 2020; Label: Écurie; Format: Digital download	—

=== Singles ===
==== As lead artist ====
Title	Year	Peak chart positions							Certifications	Album
Title	Year	FRA	AUT	BEL (WA)	CAN	GER	SWI	US Dance	Certifications	Album
"City Lights"	2014	—	—	—	—	—	—	—		Svmmer Svn Vol. 2
"Alone"	2015	—	—	—	—	—	—	—		Non-album single
"Sunset Lover"	2015	6	73	7	80	66	44	13	MC: 2× Platinum	Petit Biscuit EP and Presence
"Oceans"	2015	—	—	—	—	—	—	—		Presence
"Gravitation" (with Møme featuring Isaac Delusion)	2017	24	—	—	—	—	—	—		Presence
"Waterfall" (with Panama)	2017	147	—	—	—	—	—	40		Presence
"Problems" (featuring Lido)	2018	—	—	—	—	—	—	49		Presence
"Demain" (featuring Bigflo & Oli)	2018	5	—	96	—	—	91	—		La vie de rêve
"Wake Up" (featuring Bipolar Sunshine and Cautious Clay)	2018	—	—	—	—	—	—	—		Presence
"Suffer" (with SKOTT)	2018	—	—	—	—	—	—	—		Non-album singles
"Safe"	2018	—	—	—	—	—	—	—		Non-album singles
"Wide Awake"	2019	—	—	—	—	—	—	—		Non-album singles
"We Were Young" (with JP Cooper)	2019	162	—	—	—	—	—	43		Non-album singles
"Chateau"	2020	—	—	—	—	—	—	—		Songs for Australia
"I Leave Again" (featuring Shallou)	2020	—	—	—	—	—	—	25		Parachute
"Drivin Thru The Night"	2020	—	—	—	—	—	—	—		Parachute
"Burnin"	2020	—	—	—	—	—	—	—		Parachute
"You Don't Ignore (Too Late)"	2023	—	—	—	—	—	—	—		Discipline
"Honor Your Goals"	2024	—	—	—	—	—	—	—		Discipline
"Bad Episode"	2024	—	—	—	—	—	—	—		Discipline
"I Forgot What's Love" (with Cub Sport)	2024	—	—	—	—	—	—	—		Discipline
"Shorter Than the Night"	2024	—	—	—	—	—	—	—		Discipline
"Cruel Heart"	2024	—	—	—	—	—	—	—		Discipline
"—" denotes a single that did not chart or was not released.

==== Promotional singles ====
Title	Year	Album
"You"	2015	Non-album singles
"Sleepless"	2015	Non-album singles
"Palms"	2015	Non-album singles
"Night Trouble"	2015	Non-album singles
"Midnight Sky"	2015	Non-album singles
"Memories"	2015	Non-album singles
"Open Your Eyes"	2015	Petit Biscuit EP
"Beam"	2017	Presence

=== Other charted songs ===
Title	Year	Peak chart positions	Album
Title	Year	FRA	Album
"Iceland"	2017	68	Petit Biscuit

=== Remixes ===
Song	Year	Artist
"The Magic"	2014	Totalmess
"Tell Her"	2014	Once A Tree
"Her"	2014	Vagabond
"Pretty Thoughts" (with Joey Ugh)	2014	Alina Baraz & Galimatias
"Faded"	2015	Zhu
"Such A Mess"	2015	Lostodyssey
"Fais Rien"	2015	Moi Je
"Memories That You Call" (featuring Monsoonsiren)	2015	Odesza
"Just a Lover" (featuring George Maple)	2016	Hayden James
"Stay (featuring Alessia Cara)	2017	Zedd
"Rushing Back" (featuring Vera Blue)	2019	Flume

== Awards and nominations ==
=== International Dance Music Awards ===
Year	Category	Work	Result	Ref.
2019	Best Downtempo Artist (Male)	—N/a	Won	
2020	Best Downtempo Artist (Male)	—N/a	Won	

==== Berlin Music Video Awards ====
Berlin Music Video Awards is an international festival founded in 2013 that puts the talents behind music videos into the spotlight. Supporting both unknown and famous artists, it is a primary networking event for the video and music industries in Europe. Filled with a vast selection of music video marathons, professional judges, live performances, filmmaking workshops and networking events, the festival is not only meeting ground for filmmakers, but also for musicians as well as all music enthusiasts.

Year	Category	Work	Result	Ref.
2021	Best Director	Burnin (directed by Aube Perrie)	Nominated	
