= Melodrama (The Crash album) =

The Melodrama

Studio album by The Crash
- Released: 2003
- Genre: Synthpop, pop, rock
- Length: 37:58
- Label: Warner Music Finland
- Producer: The Crash

The Crash chronology
Wildlife (2001)	The Melodrama (2003)	Selected Songs 1999–2005 (2005)

Melodrama is the third studio album by Finnish Britpop band The Crash, released in 2003.

== Track listing ==
No.	Title	Length
1.	"Prologue"	1:36
2.	"Still Alive"	4:05
3.	"Best of the Best"	4:17
4.	"Gigolo"	3:43
5.	"Flash"	4:04
6.	"It's Contagious"	3:45
7.	"Oh What a Thing"	4:19
8.	"What If I Meet You"	3:15
9.	"Trouble"	3:48
10.	"Catfight"	2:56
11.	"Moonlight for Lovers"	2:04

- All songs have been written by Teemu Brunila

== Band members ==
- Teemu Brunila – vocals, guitar, keyboard
- Samuli Haataja – bass guitar
- Erkki Kaila – drums
- Tomi Mäkilä – keyboard
