= We Were Young (song) =

Single by Petit Biscuit featuring JP Cooper
- Released: 29 May 2019
- Length: 3:34
- Label: Petit Biscuit Music

Petit Biscuit singles chronology
"Wide Awake" (2019)	"We Were Young" (2019)	"Chateau" (2020)

JP Cooper singles chronology
"Sing It with Me" (2019)	"We Were Young" (2019)	"Losing Me" (2019)

"We Were Young" is a song by French DJ and music producer Petit Biscuit, featuring vocals from English singer-songwriter JP Cooper. It was released as a single on 29 May 2019 by Petit Biscuit Music.

== Background ==
In an interview with Billboard, Petit Biscuit said, "'We Were Young' is like a hymn to an innocent love, a beautiful love ... even a bit too beautiful to be true. We Were Young really is a big blend of my pop and electronic influences, even going to gospel on the choruses. Working together with JP on the different vocal parts of the track was a real pleasure. His particular tone brought a lot of freshness to my electronic production." JP Cooper said, "I was so excited to get in the studio with Mehdi. I'd heard some of his work and his sound I absolutely loved. Genuinely, I think this kid is a bit of a genius when it comes to electronic music. I wanted to make sure that I brought a little bit of my flavor to the track, and I think it fused beautifully. It was really interesting to try and write a classic-sounding chorus over such a modern-sounding track, and I'm super happy with how it turned out."

== Music video ==
A music video to accompany the release of "We Were Young" was first released onto YouTube on 3 July 2019.

== Track listing ==
Digital download
No.	Title	Length
1.	"We Were Young"	3:34

Digital download
No.	Title	Length
1.	"We Were Young" (feat. JP Cooper) (DROELOE Remix)	3:04

Digital download
No.	Title	Length
1.	"We Were Young" (DROELOE Remix)	3:04
2.	"We Were Young" (Robotaki Remix)	3:16
3.	"We Were Young" (Paul Woolford Remix)	4:48
4.	"We Were Young" (Nohost Remix)	3:36
5.	"We Were Young" (Instrumental)	3:34

== Charts ==
Chart (2019)	Peak position
Belgium (Ultratip Bubbling Under Wallonia)	27
France (SNEP)	162
US Hot Dance/Electronic Songs (Billboard)	43

== Release history ==
Region	Date	Format	Label
United Kingdom	29 May 2019	Digital download; streaming	Petit Biscuit Music
