= Sunset Lover =

Single by Petit Biscuit

from the EP Petit Biscuit and album Presence
- Released: 15 June 2015
- Recorded: 2014
- Genre: Chillwave; tropical house
- Length: 3:57
- Label: Petit Biscuit (independent)
- Songwriter: Petit Biscuit
- Producer: Petit Biscuit

Petit Biscuit singles chronology
| "Alone" (2015) | "Sunset Lover" (2015) | "Oceans" (2015) |

"Sunset Lover" is the single by French-Moroccan DJ and music producer Petit Biscuit. It was first published on SoundCloud on 22 February 2015, initially available as a free download, and was released independently on 15 June 2015, later featuring on his eponymous debut EP (2016), debut album Presence (2017), and compilation album We Were Young (The Playlist) (2019).

"Sunset Lover" entered the French Singles Chart in May 2016, and went on to peak at number 3 in March 2017. As of April 2022, it has amassed over 690 million streams on Spotify.

The single has only one line of lyrics "Ha-hallelujah, oh, I'm down on the beach." Due to the inclusion of the word Hallelujah, the song has been muted in some countries.

== Music video ==
A music video to accompany the release of "Sunset Lover" was first released onto YouTube on 8 September 2016 at a total length of three minutes and thirty-six seconds.

== Track listings ==
"Sunset Lover" digital download
| No. | Title | Length |
|---|---|---|
| 1. | "Sunset Lover" | 3:57 |

== Charts ==
=== Weekly charts ===
Weekly chart performance for "Sunset Lover"
| Chart (2016–19) | Peak position |
|---|---|
| Austria (Ö3 Austria Top 40) | 73 |
| Belgium (Ultratop 50 Flanders) | 43 |
| Belgium (Ultratop 50 Wallonia) | 7 |
| Canada Hot 100 (Billboard) | 80 |
| Czech Republic Singles Digital (ČNS IFPI) | 42 |
| France (SNEP) | 3 |
| Germany (GfK) | 66 |
| Ireland (IRMA) | 87 |
| Italy (FIMI) | 49 |
| Netherlands (Single Top 100) | 86 |
| Norway (VG-lista) | 36 |
| Scotland Singles (Official Charts) | 93 |
| Slovakia Singles Digital (ČNS IFPI) | 40 |
| Sweden (Sverigetopplistan) | 62 |
| Switzerland (Schweizer Hitparade) | 44 |
| US Hot Dance/Electronic Songs (Billboard) | 13 |

=== Year-end charts ===
Year-end chart performance for "Sunset Lover"
| Chart (2016) | Position |
|---|---|
| France (SNEP) | 77 |
| US Hot Dance/Electronic Songs (Billboard) | 85 |
| Chart (2017) | Position |
| Australia Streaming Tracks (ARIA) | 98 |
| Belgium (Ultratop Wallonia) | 17 |
| France (SNEP) | 9 |
| US Hot Dance/Electronic Songs (Billboard) | 58 |
| Chart (2018) | Position |
| France (SNEP) | 160 |

== Certifications ==
Certifications for "Sunset Lover"
| Region | Certification | Certified units/sales |
|---|---|---|
| Austria (IFPI Austria) | Gold | 15,000^{‡} |
| Belgium (BRMA) | Gold | 10,000^{‡} |
| Canada (Music Canada) | 2× Platinum | 160,000^{‡} |
| Denmark (IFPI Danmark) | Gold | 45,000^{‡} |
| France (SNEP) | Diamond | 233,333^{‡} |
| Italy (FIMI) | Platinum | 50,000^{‡} |
| New Zealand (RMNZ) | 2× Platinum | 60,000^{‡} |
| Spain (Promusicae) | Gold | 30,000^{‡} |
| United Kingdom (BPI) | Platinum | 600,000^{‡} |
^{‡} Sales+streaming figures based on certification alone.

== Release history ==
Release history and formats for "Sunset Lover"
| Region | Date | Format | Label | Ref. |
|---|---|---|---|---|
| France | 15 June 2015 | Digital download | Self-released | |
