= Pony Ride (The Crash album) =

Studio album by The Crash
- Released: September 27, 2006
- Genre: Britpop, pop, rock
- Length: 38:00
- Label: Warner Music Finland
- Producer: The Crash

The Crash chronology
Selected Songs 1999–2005 (2005)	Pony Ride (2006)

Professional ratings
Review scores
Source	Rating
Popmatters	7/10
Rave	3.5/5 stars

Pony Ride is the fourth and the last studio album by Finnish Britpop band The Crash, released on 27 September 2006.

== Track listing ==
No.	Title	Length
1.	"Pony Ride"	3:39
2.	"Big Ass Love"	3:31
3.	"Grace"	3:46
4.	"Stay"	4:04
5.	"Thorn in My Side"	3:59
6.	"Stalker"	3:58
7.	"Filthy Flower"	3:30
8.	"Backstage"	3:57
9.	"Reasons to Sing"	3:13
10.	"These Days"	3:59

== Band members ==
- Teemu Brunila – vocals, guitar, keyboard
- Samuli Haataja – bass guitar
- Erkki Kaila – drums
- Tomi Mäkilä – keyboards

== Chart positions ==
Chart (2006)	Peak position
Finnish Albums (Suomen virallinen lista)	2
