= Sing It with Me =

Single by JP Cooper & Astrid S

from the album She
- Released: 3 May 2019
- Length: 3:21
- Label: Island Records
- Songwriters: Steve Mac, Henrik Michelsen, Electric, Danny Parker, JP Cooper
- Producer: Steve Mac

JP Cooper singles chronology
"Cheerleader" (2018)	"Sing It with Me" (2019)	"We Were Young" (2019)

Astrid S singles chronology
"Only When It Rains" (2019)	"Sing It with Me" (2019)	"The First One" (2019)

"Sing It with Me" is a song by English singer-songwriter JP Cooper and Norwegian singer and songwriter Astrid S. It was released as a single on 3 May 2019 by Island Records.

== Background ==
When talking about the song, Cooper said, "I’m pretty sure that the reason most guys pick up a guitar and write a song for the first time, it's usually down to a girl. 'Sing It With Me' is a song about just that. It's the idea of writing a song for somebody that you didn't quite have the courage to simply say hi to. It's a romanticised version of that I guess, only this time the guy gets the girl (for me in reality I'd likely record it 50 times, only to decide it’s terrible and scrap it). I wanted to feature an artist with an incredibly sweet voice and Astrid S fit the bill perfectly. I was so excited to hear her on the track and she definitely delivered. I tried my best to write a chorus that was almost as infectious as 'Baby Shark' but very quickly realised that it was impossible. Overall, I think it turned out pretty well."

== Music video ==
A music video to accompany the release of "Sing It with Me" was first released onto YouTube on 30 May 2019. When talking about the music video, Cooper said, "I love 90's American indie films like Slacker, Rushmore and Napoleon Dynamite so the fact that it nods to that era… is great. We filmed it in Estonia with a brief for the location and the characters to all have a slight Wes Anderson feel, which I think the production company nailed. I’m usually quite nervous about making music videos. This is the first one of mine that I’ve watched back and smiled all the way through."

== Track listing ==
Digital download
No.	Title	Length
1.	"Sing It With Me"	3:21

Digital download
No.	Title	Length
1.	"Sing It With Me" (Acoustic)	3:41
2.	"Sing It With Me" (Guitar Acoustic)	3:24
3.	"Sing It With Me" (Piano Acoustic)	3:24
4.	"Sing It With Me"	3:21

Digital download
No.	Title	Length
1.	"Sing It With Me" (Just Kiddin' Remix Radio Edit)	3:00
2.	"Sing It With Me" (Just Kiddin' Remix)	5:41

Digital download
No.	Title	Length
1.	"Sing It With Me" (Embody Remix)	3:00

== Charts ==
Chart (2019)	Peak position
Belgium (Ultratip Bubbling Under Flanders)	3
Belgium (Ultratip Bubbling Under Wallonia)	6
Norway (VG-lista)	22
Romania (Airplay 100)	65
Sweden (Sverigetopplistan)	76

== Certifications ==
Region	Certification	Certified units/sales
Brazil (Pro-Música Brasil)	Gold	20,000^{‡}
Denmark (IFPI Danmark)	Gold	45,000^{‡}
Portugal (AFP)	Gold	5,000^{‡}
Spain (Promusicae)	Gold	30,000^{‡}
United Kingdom (BPI)	Silver	200,000^{‡}
^{‡} Sales+streaming figures based on certification alone.

== Release history ==
Region	Date	Format	Label
United Kingdom	3 May 2019	Digital download; streaming	Island Records
