= She's on My Mind =

"She's On My Mind"

Single by JP Cooper

from the album Raised Under Grey Skies
- Released: 21 July 2017
- Recorded: 2016
- Genre: Pop
- Length: 2:58
- Label: Island Records
- Songwriters: John Paul Cooper; Teemu Brunila; Benjamin McIldowie; Jon Hume
- Producers: Mike Spencer; Jon Hume; Teemu Brunila

JP Cooper singles chronology
"Passport Home" (2017)	"She's On My Mind" (2017)	"Wait" (2017)

'She's On My Mind' is a song by English singer JP Cooper. It was released as the fourth single of his debut studio album Raised Under Grey Skies.

The song was released as a digital download in the United Kingdom on 21 July 2017 through Island Records. The song has charted in Belgium. The song was written by John Paul Cooper, Teemu Brunila, Benjamin McIldowie and Jon Cobbe Hume.

== Background ==
In an interview with Fortitude Magazine, JP Cooper talked about the single by saying, "The title says it all, 'She’s on My Mind' is a song about having somebody invade your thoughts no matter how much you try to move forward, I’m sure most people have experienced this and we wanted the song to have the same infectious effect.

"I’m so glad we managed to release this before the summer is over as it’s definitely a song to enjoy in the sun. Written with the same close friends that I wrote September Song with, it was a lot of fun bringing this one to life."

In an interview with the Official Charts Company, he was asked if he expected his output as a musician to be this slow? He replied: "It’s difficult to put out another song when people are still enjoying your current one. It’s a weird one because [September Song] just keeps going. It was staggered as well, so by the time we got going with the next single Passport Home, radio was only just picking up September Song. I feel like everyone's in sync with the new single She's On My Mind, so we'll see how that goes. It'd be great to get another big one in the bag."

== Accompanying video ==
An official lyric video to accompany the release of 'She's on My Mind' was first released onto YouTube on 20 July 2017 at a total length of two minutes and fifty-nine seconds.

An official promo video - clocking at three minutes and fifteen seconds - also appeared online on 27 September 2017.

A live stripped back version of the song filmed in a mocked-up cafe has been uploaded by Vevo too.

== Track listing ==
Digital download - Album version
No.	Title	Length
1.	"She's On My Mind"	2:58

Digital download - Acoustics
No.	Title	Length
1.	"She's On My Mind" (Acoustic)	2:32
2.	"She's On My Mind" (Guitar Acoustic)	2:46

Digital download - Remixes
No.	Title	Length
1.	"She's On My Mind" (Bruno Martini Remix)	2:48
2.	"She's On My Mind" (Ryan Riback Remix)	3:24
3.	"She's On My Mind" (KC Lights Remix)	3:56

== Charts ==
Chart (2017–18)	Peak position
Belarus Airplay (Eurofest)	10
Belgium (Ultratip Bubbling Under Flanders)	10
Belgium (Ultratip Bubbling Under Wallonia)	11
Hungary (Rádiós Top 40)	36
Hungary (Single Top 40)	30
Italy (FIMI)	51
Romania (Airplay 100)	3
Russia Airplay (Tophit)	12
Scotland Singles (OCC)	81
Slovakia Airplay (ČNS IFPI)	60
UK Singles (OCC)	93
Ukraine Airplay (TopHit)	13

== Certifications ==
Region	Certification	Certified units/sales
Italy (FIMI)	Platinum	50,000^{‡}
United Kingdom (BPI)	Silver	200,000^{‡}
^{‡} Sales+streaming figures based on certification alone.

== Release history ==
Region	Date	Format	Label
United Kingdom	21 July 2017	Digital download	Island Records
