= Insatiable (album) =

Studio album by Nadine Coyle
- Released: 8 November 2010
- Recorded: 2008–2010
- Studio: London, Los Angeles, Malibu, Stockholm
- Genre: Pop; pop rock; R&B
- Length: 49:04
- Label: Black Pen
- Producer: Ricci Riccardi; Toby Gad; Guy Chambers; Julian Bunetta; Quiz & Larossi; William Orbit

Nadine Coyle chronology
Insatiable (2010)	Nadine (2018)

Singles from Insatiable
- 1. "Insatiable" Released: 1 November 2010

Insatiable is the debut studio album by Irish singer Nadine Coyle. It was released in the United Kingdom and Ireland on 8 November 2010, through Black Pen Records. Looking to transition from the electropop styles of her previous music as part of Girls Aloud, Coyle began to work on a solo album during the hiatus of the group. She enlisted writers and producers such as Toby Gad, Guy Chambers and William Orbit, co-writing its thirteen tracks alongside them. Coyle began to embrace a more sophisticated sound with Insatiable, and its songs incorporate genres of pop rock and R&B.

The title track was released as the album's sole single on 1 November 2010. Its poor commercial performance was highly criticised by the media, with reports attributing low physical sales to limited availability of the single. The song debuted in the top forty in both the United Kingdom and Ireland, dropping out of the charts the following week.

Upon its release, Insatiable received generally mixed to unfavourable reviews from music critics, who complimented its cohesiveness and maturity, but criticised the homogeneity and lack of personality shown on the record. The album was distributed exclusively by grocery store chain Tesco, and debuted at number 47 on the UK Albums Chart, with first-week sales of 5,450 copies.

== Background ==
Following seven years as a member of girl group Girls Aloud, Coyle announced plans to release a solo album during the group's hiatus. In May 2009, Coyle announced that she had signed a publishing deal with EMI. She enlisted Barbara Charone, who was worked with Madonna and Christina Aguilera, as a publicist and Bruce Garfield as her manager. Despite early reports indicating three major record labels interested in Coyle, it was reported that she had failed to earn a solo record deal. In April 2010, it was reported she had signed to Geffen Records, a deal which later fell through.

In August 2010, Coyle officially signed a deal with grocery store chain Tesco to exclusively distribute Insatiable. Tesco's head of entertainment Rob Salter said in a statement: "We are delighted that Nadine Coyle has agreed to entrust the first album of her solo career to Tesco. Nadine has delivered a real album with musical integrity and, most of all, that great big warm voice and fantastic songs which we believe will speak to all of Tesco's customers." The album itself was released through her own label, Black Pen Records. Coyle stated that "the traditional model for selling an album isn't the only way of doing things" and that the new process was a "once-in-a-lifetime opportunity for an artist."

=== Production ===
Coyle recorded the album in London, Los Angeles, Malibu, and Stockholm. She worked with a number of famous songwriters and producers during recording sessions, such as Desmond Child, Guy Chambers, Mike Elizondo, Steve Booker, Toby Gad, Tony Kanal, and newcomer Ricci Riccardi. Coyle also worked with Lucie Silvas, Matchbox Twenty's Kyle Cook, William Orbit, and Tiesto. Coyle said she had sketched out most of the tracks in her London flat, before taking them to producers. Some of the original vocals, recorded in her front room and bathroom, remain on the finished record. According to an interview with Booker, Coyle had worked on song ideas using GarageBand which she then presented to Booker in England to work on together further. The producer said, "She was singing her songs to loops, and then I took the loops out and rewrote the music from scratch to her ideas."

== Music ==
According to the official press release, the album includes "influences ranging from the 80’s to the noughties via Motown, sleek soul, blissed out ballads and a major injection of Tina Turneresque va-va-voooom." She also drew inspiration from soul band Sade's album Soldier of Love (2010). The title track, co-written with Guy Chambers, "showcases a harder, guitar-led sound for the pop singer." It was described as "a bombastic synthy pop morsel." "Red Light" is "a disco dazzler" and "an Annie Lennox-goes-electro-glam stomper", with a 40-second guitar solo. "Chained" is a R&B song with "a sparkly synth backline" built around a synth riff similar to Whitney Houston's "My Love Is Your Love". "Natural", also co-written with Chambers, was called "a slinky little number." "Unbroken" is "a soulful, smouldering, five-minute-long ballad" which sees Coyle sing in a "near-operatic falsetto". Two other songs heard by the BBC included a more straightforward pop number, and a show-stopping minor key ballad in the style of 1970s singer-songwriters like Carole King and Joni Mitchell.

== Release and promotion ==
The album was released on 8 November 2010. It was sold exclusively in Tesco stores. She performed at London's G-A-Y on Saturday, 30 October. On 19 October, a five-track Insatiable sampler was released through Nadine's official website, and made available for download. The sampler includes snippets of "Insatiable", "Put Your Hands Up", "Chained", "Red Light" and "Sexy Love Affair". She also promoted the album by performing to several hundred retail managers at the annual Tesco Company Conference 2010 at ExCeL London on 4 November 2010. Alongside interviews on both TV, radio and her own T4 special. .

== Singles ==
"Insatiable", the album's title track, served as the lead single upon its release on 1 November. Upon release, the track garnered heavy critical praise. Co-written with Guy Chambers and produced by newcomer Ricci Riccardi, BBC said the song "showcases a harder, guitar-led sound for the pop singer." It is said to be "ballsy and Eighties-influenced", receiving comparisons to The Bangles. A clip of the single appeared on Nadine's website on 6 September. The song received its official world premiere on In:Demand on 10 September. The music video, directed by Wayne Isham, was filmed in Los Angeles. The video premiered on 3 October. The single entered the UK Singles Chart at number 26 selling 11,392 copies. "Insatiable" entered the Irish top 50 at number 20.

== Critical reception ==
Professional ratings
Review scores
Source	Rating
BBC Music	(positive)
Daily Express	2/5 stars
The Daily Telegraph	2/5 stars
The Guardian	3/5 stars
The Irish Times	3/5 stars
NME	(6/10)
The Scotsman	1/5 stars
Virgin Media	2/5 stars
Yahoo! Music	(6/10)

Insatiable received generally mixed to negative reviews from music critics. Aggregating website AnyDecentMusic? reports a rating of 5.6 based on eight reviews. Fraser McAlpine of BBC Music felt that it "does tend to skitter across [...] a fine line between Heartfelt and A Bit Dim [...] in quite a distracting fashion", but noticed that its "quirks and idiosyncrasies are wrapped up in immaculately produced, grown-up pop music, hand-tooled by experts" and called it "lively and enjoyable in lots of ways". Tony Clayton-Lea from The Irish Times wrote that "it’s nothing we haven’t heard before, but as femme-pop goes, it’s a belter". Caroline Sullivan of The Guardian called it a "hook-filled record" of "sumptuous pop and Motownish melodies", but felt that it "doesn't make more of [Coyle's] voice" and concluded by stating that "she needs to plunge in properly if she's going to be a viable solo star". Sam Wolfson of NME felt that the album sounds "anachronistic" but praised the absence of auto-tune, saying that "it’s a pleasant reminder that pop homogeneity isn’t compulsory and most songs are fine without a guest slot from Flo Rida and a massive drop every nine seconds". James Berry of Yahoo! Music noticed that Coyle's "budget didn't stretch as far as cutting edge production" but ultimately described the album as "a consistent, strutting and reasonably on the button pop record". Charlotte Heathcote from Daily Express wrote that Insatiable "holds its own [...] but its pop-by-numbers approach lacks the individuality to stand out in a marketplace saturated with expensively produced pop" and noticed that "it squanders [Coyle's] killer ingredient: that belter of a voice".

Lucy Jones of The Daily Telegraph gave the album a mixed review, saying that "once you sweep away William Orbit's glittering production and the hyper-stylised image of the Derry-born pop princess, there’s few outstanding songs here to leave the listener satisfied". Ian Gittins from Virgin Media wrote that Coyle "fails to use her deadliest weapon – her voice – to full effect on this proficient but somewhat personality-free album, preferring to warble gently over generic pop/R&B cuts". The Scotsman was equally negative, describing the album as "homogenised pop pap from a variety of proven popular suppliers, none of whom enhance their slender reputations" and calling it "a career low point".

== Chart performance ==
Insatiable was released exclusively through supermarket chain Tesco. It was available as a physical CD release in stores, or as an MP3 download on the Tesco website. The album was not available on iTunes, Play, Amazon, HMV or any other music download website. The album entered the UK Albums Chart at number 47, selling 5,450 copies in its first week. In its second week of release, the album fell to number 131 selling a further 1,809 copies. The album debuted at number 4 on the UK Independent Chart and spent two weeks inside the top 10. In Ireland the album reached number 20 on the Official Irish Chart in its first week of release there. In the Irish indie chart, Insatiable peaked at number 2. As of November 2011, Insatiable has sold 13,000 copies in the United Kingdom.

== Track listing ==
No.	Title	Writer(s)	Producer(s)	Length
1.	"Runnin'"	Nadine Coyle; Julian Bunetta; Ruth-Anne Cunningham	Bunetta	4:05
2.	"Put Your Hands Up"	Coyle; Arnthor Birgisson	Birgisson	3:45
3.	"Chained"	Coyle; Ricci Riccardi; Gareth Owen	Riccardi	3:59
4.	"Insatiable"	Coyle; Guy Chambers	Riccardi	3:07
5.	"Red Light"	Coyle; Steve Booker; Riccardi; Owen	Riccardi	4:11
6.	"My Sexy Love Affair"	Coyle; Toby Gad	Gad	4:06
7.	"Lullaby"	Coyle; Alex Cantrell; Louis Bell	Cantrell; Bell	3:13
8.	"You Are the One"	Coyle; Gad	Gad	4:06
9.	"Natural"	Coyle; Chambers	Chambers	3:36
10.	"Raw"	Coyle; Chambers	Riccardi	3:44
11.	"Rumors"	Coyle; Alex James; Andreas Romdhane; Josef Larossi	Quiz & Larossi	3:52
12.	"Unbroken"	Coyle; Booker	William Orbit	5:04
13.	"I'll Make a Man Out of You Yet"	Coyle	Riccardi	4:16

== Charts ==
Chart (2010)	Peak position
Irish Albums (IRMA)	20
Irish Independent Albums (IRMA)	2
Scottish Albums (OCC)	51
UK Albums (OCC)	47
UK Independent Albums (OCC)	4
