= Comfort Deluxe =

Studio album by The Crash
- Released: 1999
- Genre: Britpop, pop, rock
- Length: 42:35
- Label: Warner Music Finland
- Producer: The Crash

The Crash chronology
Comfort Deluxe (1999)	Wildlife (2001)

Professional ratings
Review scores
Source	Rating
Allmusic	4/5 stars
Metal Hammer	(5/7)

Comfort Deluxe is the debut studio album by Finnish Britpop band The Crash, released in 1999.

== Track listing ==
No.	Title	Length
1.	"Sugared"	4:26
2.	"World of My Own"	4:16
3.	"Fidelity"	3:54
4.	"Coming Home"	4:30
5.	"Polar"	4:10
6.	"Furious Boy"	3:18
7.	"I Never Dance"	3:40
8.	"Take My Time"	3:38
9.	"Muse"	4:17
10.	"Prophecy"	3:01
11.	"Going Out"	3:12

== Band members ==
- Teemu Brunila – vocals, guitar
- Samuli Haataja – bass guitar
- Erkki Kaila – drums
- Toni Ahola – keyboard

== Chart positions ==
Chart (1999)	Peak position
Finnish Albums (Suomen virallinen lista)	26
