= The Crash (band) =

Finnish pop rock band

- Origin: Turku, Finland
- Genres: Pop rock
- Years active: 1991–2009
- Past members: Teemu Brunila; Samuli Haataja; Erkki Kaila; Samuli Jokinen
- Website: www.thecrash.com

The Crash was a pop rock band from Turku, Finland, originally influenced by Britpop but later taking its lead from a diverse range of genres including Motown, disco, new wave and 80's rock. The band formed after Teemu Brunila and Samuli Haataja met in 1991, with both Erkki Kaila and Dani Aavinen joining to complete the line up. Originally, the band was called Ladies & Gentlemen, but later changed its name to New Deal, then again changed it to The Crush. In 1998, the name was changed to The Crash and Dani Aavinen was replaced by keyboard player, Toni Ahola.

== History ==
Their debut album, Comfort Deluxe, was released on Warner Music Finland in 1999, and was followed by a tour of Europe including Sweden, Germany, and Austria, as well as a successful performance at the In The City festival in Manchester, England. This caught the attention of Melody Maker and MTV Nordic. By this time Toni Ahola had left the band to further his studies and Jussi Lehtinen stepped in. A second Warner Music album, Wildlife, was released in 2001, with the single from that album, "Lauren Caught My Eye", (later, re-recorded and released on the album Pony Ride as just "Lauren") becoming the first video by a Finnish artist to be powerplayed on MTV. This, along with the music video for follow-up single "Star" (later, re-recorded and released on the album Pony Ride as "Solitudinarian") earned the band a nomination for Best Nordic Artist at the MTV Europe Awards held in Barcelona in 2002. Other nominated artists were Röyksopp, Saybia, The Hives and, eventual winners, Kent. It was at this time that Jussi Lehtinen left the band to be replaced by Tomi Mäkilä. The band's third album, Melodrama – also on Warner Finland – showed a marked departure from their earlier melancholic sound, with lead single "Still Alive" particularly helping to find a whole new audience for the band. The album entered the Finnish charts at #2 and stayed on the list for 11 weeks. It was at this time that "Star" was picked to be used on an eBay commercial on German TV, proving to be one of the most successful German TV campaigns to date. The Crash toured Germany intensively as a headline act as well as opening on large tours with local bands Reamonn and Sportfreunde Stiller. "Star" eventually reached #21 in the German sales chart. Despite the efforts of Warner Music Germany to market the Melodrama album by including "Star" as a bonus track on the German version, the album failed to make any impact in the German charts upon release.

Following reasonable success in Scandinavia and Central Europe, the band turned its attention to the USA where interest was being shown by several major record companies including Capitol Records, Maverick Records, Warner/Atlantic and Hollywood Records. A short trip to the US followed in March 2005, where the band performed a packed show at the SXSW Festival in Austin, Texas leading to Billboard Magazine picking The Crash as one of the ten acts to catch that year, along with Bloc Party and M.I.A. The Crash also appeared at the legendary Viper Room in LA and the equally famous CBGB's in New York City. During this period the band was busy recording the Pony Ride album and decided to leave Warner Finland after 3 very successful domestic-selling albums. Instead the group financed the new recordings itself and licensed the finished album to several labels around the world. Pony Ride was released in Finland in September 2006 on Suomen Musiikki and entered the Finnish album chart at #2. In January 2007 the band signed deals with Rubber Records to release Pony Ride in Australia and New Zealand, and with Rykodisc to release the album in USA and Canada. The Crash returned to SXSW in March 2007 to perform at the Rykodisc showcase.

"Reasons To Sing" from the Pony Ride album was featured in the 17 November 2008 edition of The CW TV's Gossip Girl, reaching an audience, according to the U.S. Nielsen rating, of 2.88 million viewers.

On 2 April 2009 a press release was sent out by the band's Finnish booking agency, Live Nation, announcing that The Crash had decided to split up and would be performing a farewell tour of Finland in May 2009. The last performance by The Crash took place at the band's hometown festival, Ruisrock in Turku, on 5 July 2009.

== Members ==
- Teemu Brunila – vocals, guitar
- Samuli Haataja – bass, vocals
- Erkki Kaila – drums
- Samuli "JJ" Jokinen – keyboards

== Discography ==
=== Studio albums ===
List of albums, with details and chart positions
Title	Album details	Peak chart positions
Title	Album details	FIN
Comfort Deluxe	Released 1999	26
Wildlife	Released 2001	3
Melodrama	Released 2003	2
Selected Songs 1999–2005	Released 2005	10
Pony Ride	Released 2006	2

=== Singles ===
List of singles, with details and chart positions
Title	Year	Peak chart positions		
Title	Year	FIN	GER	SWE
"Crash (The Black EP)"	1997	—	—	—
"Take My Time"	1998	—	—	—
World of My Own	1999	—	—	—
"Sugared"	1999	—	—	—
"Coming Home"	1999	—	—	—
"Lauren Caught My Eye"	2001	3	—	44
"Star"	2001	—	28	—
"New York"	2002	—	—	—
"Still Alive"	2003	2	—	—
"Gigolo"	2003	—	—	—
"Big Ass Love"	2005	—	—	—
"Thorn in My Side"	2005	—	—	—
"Pony Ride"	2006	—	—	—
"Grace"	2006	—	—	—
"Stay"	2006	—	—	—
"—" indicates the single didn't chart or was not released in that chart's country.
