= Selected Songs 1999–2005 =

Compilation album by The Crash
- Released: 2005
- Genre: Britpop, pop, rock
- Label: Warner Music Finland
- Producer: The Crash

The Crash chronology
Melodrama (2003)	Selected Songs 1999–2005 (2005)	Pony Ride (2006)

Selected Songs 1999–2005 is a compilation album by the Finnish pop rock band The Crash, released in October 2005. The album includes the most important and meaningful songs composed during 1999–2005, but also three brand new songs: "Johnny Ran Away with You", "Big Ass Love", "Thorn in My Side".

There are two versions made of the album. One that includes only the CD, and one that offers also some DVD material; four music videos and an interview from 2003.

The album reached number 10 in The Official Finnish Charts.

== CD ==
1. Sugared
2. World of My Own
3. Fidelity
4. Coming Home
5. I Never Dance
6. Lauren Caught My Eye
7. Star
8. New York
9. Times
10. Fireworks
11. Still Alive
12. Best of the Best
13. Gigolo
14. Flash
15. Oh What a Thing
16. Johnny Ran Away with You
17. Big Ass Love
18. Thorn in My Side

=== DVD ===
1. Sugared
2. Lauren Caught My Eye
3. Star
4. Still Alive
5. Melodrama-interview

== Band members ==
- Teemu Brunila – vocals, guitar, keyboard
- Samuli Haataja – bass guitar
- Erkki Kaila – drums
- Tomi Mäkilä – keyboard
- Toni Ahola – keyboard
