= Shallou =

American musician and environmentalist

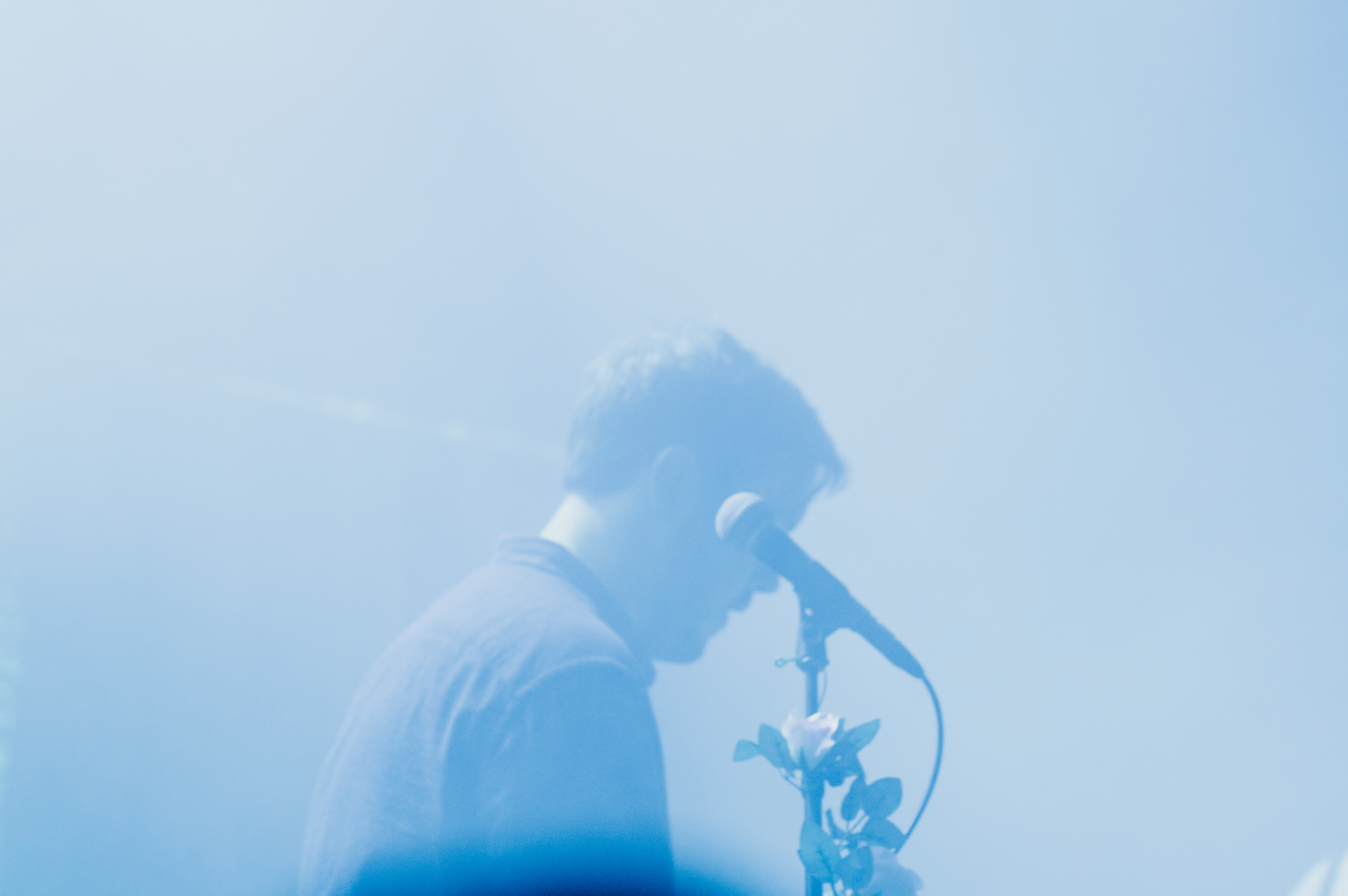
- Shallou performing on stage
- Born: Joe Boston; Washington D.C., United States
- Occupations: Singer; producer; DJ
- Years active: 2014–present
- Musical career
- Genres: Electro house; downtempo; indie electronic; alternative; tropical house
- Instruments: Vocals; guitar; bass; piano
- Label: Island Records (current), Sleeptalker (owner)
- Website: shalloumusic.com

Joe Boston, better known by his stage name Shallou, is a Los Angeles–based singer, producer, and DJ, who produces ambient, house melodies with soulful vocals that have carved a niche in the indie and electronic music scenes. His debut EP, All Becomes Okay, was released in May 2017, followed by EP Souls in April 2018, both through his own label, Sleeptalker. Shallou was signed by Island Records in 2019 and released his debut album, Magical Thinking in early 2020.

== Early life ==
Boston grew up in Rockville, Maryland with a family of intense music lovers. His dad was all about music discovery, playing Radiohead and Wilco to him when he was a kid. He was first inspired by singer James Blake and producer Gold Panda when he was around 16, combining elements of those artists into his own sound. After attending college at Loyola University New Orleans, he moved to Chicago to continue producing music. Boston currently resides in Los Angeles.

== Career ==
=== 2014–present ===
Shallou began his career during late 2014, and since then has been vastly noticed by the likes of Billboard, Sirius XM, The Fader, Complex, Spin, Indie Shuffle and Hype Machine. Shallou's 2016 singles "Heights" and "Doubt" have also received heavy rotation on multiple streaming platforms. In 2017, Shallou released his first cover, "Motion Picture Soundtrack". Shallou has released two Spotify Singles, "Begin" and a cover of Francis and the Lights "Friends", which he arranged and recorded with a string quartet at Spotify's offices in New York. He also released his debut EP, All Becomes Okay, available on all streaming services, as well as for download directly on Shallou's website, with 100% of its profit going to the Environmental Defense Fund. He has toured numerous times in every major US market, as well as a 2018 Europe tour. In March 2019, it was announced Shallou would perform at Coachella, Lollapalooza, Life is Beautiful and Outside Lands music festivals. Additionally, Shallou has played Red Rocks Amphitheater, Electric Forest, Firefly Music Festival, BUKU Music + Arts Project, amongst others. By early 2020 Shallou garnered over 350 million streams with the release of his debut album, Magical Thinking, featuring collaborations from The Knocks as well as vocalists Daya and Ashe.

On September 15, 2021, Shallou released "Heartaches", co-written by Elderbrook. Later in 2021, he released the full EP titled "The Long Way Home". On October 27th, 2023, Boston released his most recent album to date, "In Touch", on the eve of his wedding day.

== Associated acts ==
Shallou often performs with a live trio, touring with many similar artists such as Petit Biscuit, Honne, Roosevelt, Basecamp, El Ten Eleven, and Big Gigantic.

== Discography ==
=== Albums ===
Title	Details	Peak chart positions
Title	Details	US Dance
Souls	Released: April 27, 2018; Label: Sleeptalker; Format: Digital download	21
Magical Thinking	Released: March 27, 2020; Label: Island Records; Format: Digital download	-
The Long Way Home	Released: December 3, 2021; Label: Fader Label; Format: Digital download	
In Touch	Released: October 27, 2023; Label: Fader Label; Format: Digital download	

=== Extended plays ===
Title	Details
After	Released: October 16, 2015; Label: Independent; Format: Digital download
All Becomes Okay	Released: May 12, 2017; Label: Sleeptalker; Format: Digital download, CD

=== Singles ===
==== As lead artist ====
Title	Year	Peak chart positions	Album
Title	Year	US Dance	Album
"Heights"	2016	—	Non-album singles
"Slow" (with RKCB)	2016	—	Non-album singles
"Doubt" (summer edit)	2016	—	Non-album singles
"Begin" (featuring Wales)	2017	43	All Becomes Okay
"Fictions"	2017	—	All Becomes Okay
"You & Me"	2017	—	Souls
"Lie" (with Riah)	2018	32	Souls
"Find" (with Kasbo and Cody Lovaas)	2018	—	Souls
"Vignette"	2018	—	Souls
"Count On" (feat. Colin)	2018	—	Non-album singles
"All Your Days" (with Emmit Fenn)	2019	—	Non-album singles
"Fading"	2019	—	Magical Thinking
"Older" (with Daya)	2020	26	Magical Thinking

==== As featured artist ====
Title	Year	Peak chart positions	Album
Title	Year	US Dance	Album
"Come Home" (Baynk featuring Shallou)	2017	—	Someone's EP
"I Leave Again" (Petit Biscuit featuring Shallou)	2020	25	Parachute
"—" denotes a recording that did not chart or was not released.

=== Covers ===
Title	Original artist	Year	Published	Ref.
"Motion Picture Soundtrack"	Radiohead	2017	—N/a	

=== Remixes ===
Title	Original artist	Year	Published	Ref.
"Black Bear (Shallou Remix)	Andrew Belle	2014	—N/a	
"Go For It (Shallou Remix)	CRUISR	2015	—N/a	
"Dawn Faces (Shallou Remix)	Acre Tarn	2016	—N/a	
"Jungle (Shallou Remix)	Saint Mesa	2016	—N/a	
"The Other (Shallou Remix)	Lauv	2017	—N/a	
"Straightjacket (Shallou Remix)"	Quinn XCII	2017	—N/a	
"Problems (feat. Lido) [Shallou Remix]"	Petit Biscuit	2018	—N/a	
"Safe (Shallou Remix)"	Daya	2018	—N/a	
"you were good to me (shallou remix)"	Jeremy Zucker & Chelsea Cutler	2019	—N/a	
"drunk text me (Shallou remix)"	Lexi Jayde	2022	—N/a	
"Saint (Shallou remix)"	Forester	2022	—N/a	
"Clarity (Shallou remix)"	Vance Joy	2022	—N/a	

== Tracks ==
=== Published tracks ===
List of tracks, showing year released and published
Title	Year	Published
As lead Artist
"Doubt"	2015	SoundCloud
"Surface"	2015	SoundCloud
"After"	2016	SoundCloud
As Featured Artist
"Rekjavik" (Nutrition featuring Shallou)	2016	YouTube; SoundCloud
