= Petit Biscuit (EP) =

EP by Petit Biscuit
- Released: 13 May 2016
- Recorded: 2016
- Length: 23:59
- Label: Petit Biscuit
- Producer: Petit Biscuit

Petit Biscuit chronology
Petit Biscuit (2016)	Presence (2017)

Singles from Petit Biscuit
- 1. "Sunset Lover" Released: June 25, 2015

Petit Biscuit is the debut extended play (EP) by French DJ Petit Biscuit. It was released on 13 May 2016.

== Background ==
The EP features breezy vocal samples over guitars, keys and precessions.

== Singles ==
"Open Your Eyes", exclusive song from the physical version of the EP was released as a promotional single on June 8, 2015. "Sunset Lover" was released as the lead single from the EP on June 25, 2015.

== Reception ==
Andrew Claps of YourEDM reviewed the EP, stating "His signature guitar based plucks accompanied by peaceful-like melodic vocal chops instills a state of nostalgia based relapses to a more blissful time."

== Track listing ==
Petit Biscuit
No.	Title	Length
1.	"Once Again"	5:10
2.	"Sunset Lover"	3:57
3.	"Jungle"	4:33
4.	"Full Moon"	5:38
5.	"Iceland"	4:41
Total length:		23:59

Physical Releases Exclusive Track
No.	Title	Length
6.	"Open Your Eyes"	3:40
Total length:		26:39

== Charts ==
Chart (2016–17)	Peak position
French Albums (SNEP)	56

== Certifications ==
Region	Certification	Certified units/sales
France (SNEP)	Gold	50,000^{‡}
New Zealand (RMNZ)	Gold	7,500^{‡}
^{‡} Sales+streaming figures based on certification alone.
