= Nadine Coyle =

Irish singer (born 1985)

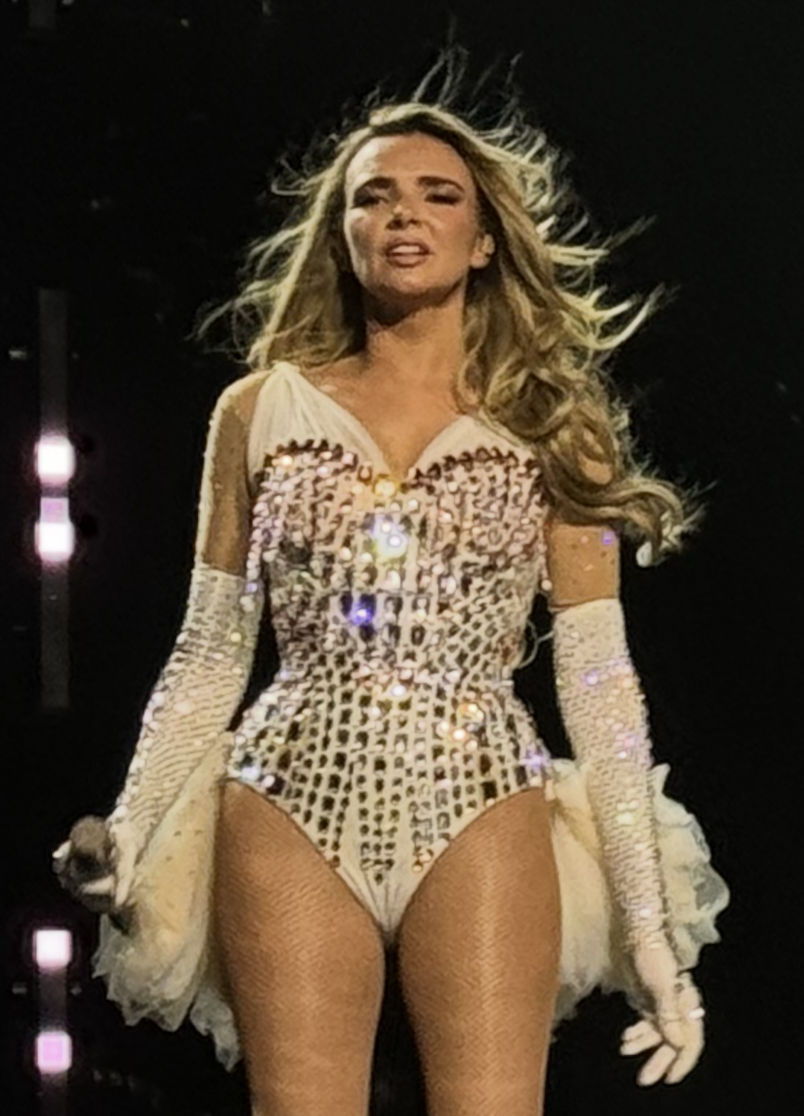
- Coyle in 2024
- Born: Nadine Elizabeth Louise Coyle; 15 June 1985 (age 41); Derry, Northern Ireland
- Occupations: Singer; model
- Years active: 1999–present
- Children: 1
- Musical career
- Genres: Pop; electropop; R&B
- Instrument: Vocals
- Labels: Polydor; Fascination; Black Pen; Virgin EMI

Nadine Elizabeth Louise Coyle (born 15 June 1985) is an Irish singer-songwriter, producer and model. In 2002, she was selected as a member of Girls Aloud, a pop girl group created through ITV's reality competition show Popstars: The Rivals. The group went on to receive large success, achieving a string of 20 consecutive UK top ten singles (including four number ones), two UK number one albums, five consecutive platinum selling studio albums, and receiving nominations for five BRIT Awards, winning Best Single in 2009 for "The Promise".

In 2010, Coyle released her debut solo studio album, Insatiable, and its title track, through her own record label, Black Pen Records, in partnership with supermarket giant Tesco. In 2017, she released the single "Go to Work" on Virgin EMI Records, and later that year, she released her debut extended play (EP), Nadine.

== Early life ==
Coyle was born on 15 June 1985 to Lillian and Niall Coyle in Derry, Northern Ireland. Her parents first noticed her talent for singing at the age of two, when she sang the Drifters' "Saturday Night at the Movies". Coyle was uninterested in her education but received good marks. She recorded a demo CD, which was distributed to Louis Walsh and The Late Late Show. The CD included cover versions of "Fields of Gold", "Somewhere Over the Rainbow", "Love Is" and the aria "Summertime".

== Career ==
=== 2001: Popstars ===
While attending Thornhill College in 2001, Coyle auditioned for the Irish version of the reality television talent show Popstars, on which Louis Walsh was a judge. She won a place in the band Six, but it was later revealed that she had lied about her age. She was 16 years old, two years younger than the minimum age requirement of 18. She returned to Thornhill College in Derry.

=== 2002–2009: Girls Aloud ===
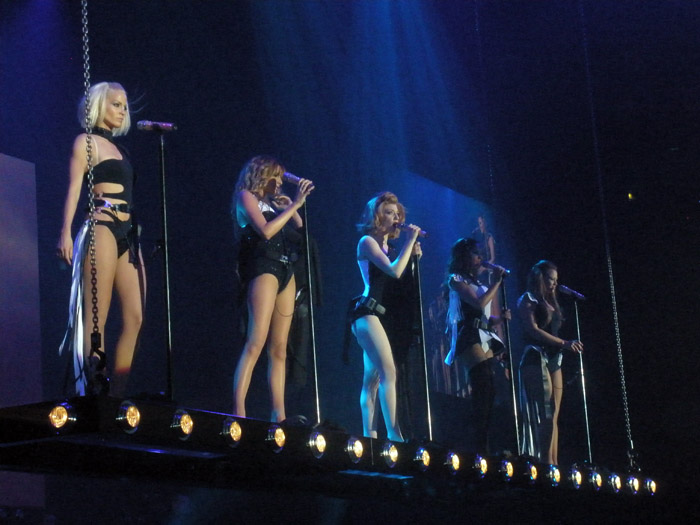
Girls Aloud performing live

Walsh encouraged Coyle to enter Popstars: The Rivals, the second British series of the international Popstars franchise. The series' goal was to create two winning pop groups – a boy band and a girl group, each consisting of five members who would then partake in "a battle of the sexes" as they vie for the Christmas number one on the UK Singles Chart. Several thousand applicants attended auditions across the UK in hope of being selected. Ten girls and ten boys were chosen as finalists by judges Walsh, Pete Waterman and Geri Halliwell. These finalists then took to the stage participating in weekly Saturday night live performances (alternating weekly between the girls and boys). Following her performance of "Fields of Gold", Walsh told her she gave the "performance of the night. Stole the show for me," while fellow judge Halliwell said, "I'd love to buy a single of yours already".

Coyle joined Cheryl Tweedy, Sarah Harding, Nicola Roberts and Kimberley Walsh to comprise the new girl group Girls Aloud, formed through the show by a public vote on 30 November 2002. The group's debut single "Sound of the Underground" peaked at number one on the UK Singles Chart, becoming the 2002 Christmas number one. Girls Aloud hold the record for the shortest time between formation and reaching number one. The group released their debut album Sound of the Underground in May 2003, which entered the charts at number two and was certified platinum by the British Phonographic Industry (BPI) later the same year. Their singles "I'll Stand by You", "Walk This Way" and "The Promise" charted at number one. Two of their albums have reached the top of the UK Albums Chart: their greatest hits album The Sound of Girls Aloud and 2008's Out of Control, both of which entered the chart at number one, with over one million copies of the former being sold. They also achieved seven certified albums and have been nominated for five Brit Awards, winning the 2009 Best Single for "The Promise".

The group's musical style is pop, but throughout their career they had experimented with electropop and dance-pop. Girls Aloud's collaborations with Brian Higgins and his songwriting and production team Xenomania earned the group critical acclaim, due to an innovative approach to mainstream pop music. The group became one of the few UK reality television acts to achieve continued success, amassing a fortune of £30 million by May 2010. Guinness World Records lists them as "Most Successful Reality TV Group" in the 2007 edition. They also hold the record for "Most Consecutive Top Ten Entries in the UK by a Female Group" in the 2008 edition and are credited again for "Most Successful Reality TV Group" in the 2011 edition. The group was also named the United Kingdom's biggest-selling girl group of the 21st century, with over 4.3 million singles sales and 4 million albums sold in the UK alone.

=== 2009–2013: Insatiable and Girls Aloud reunion ===
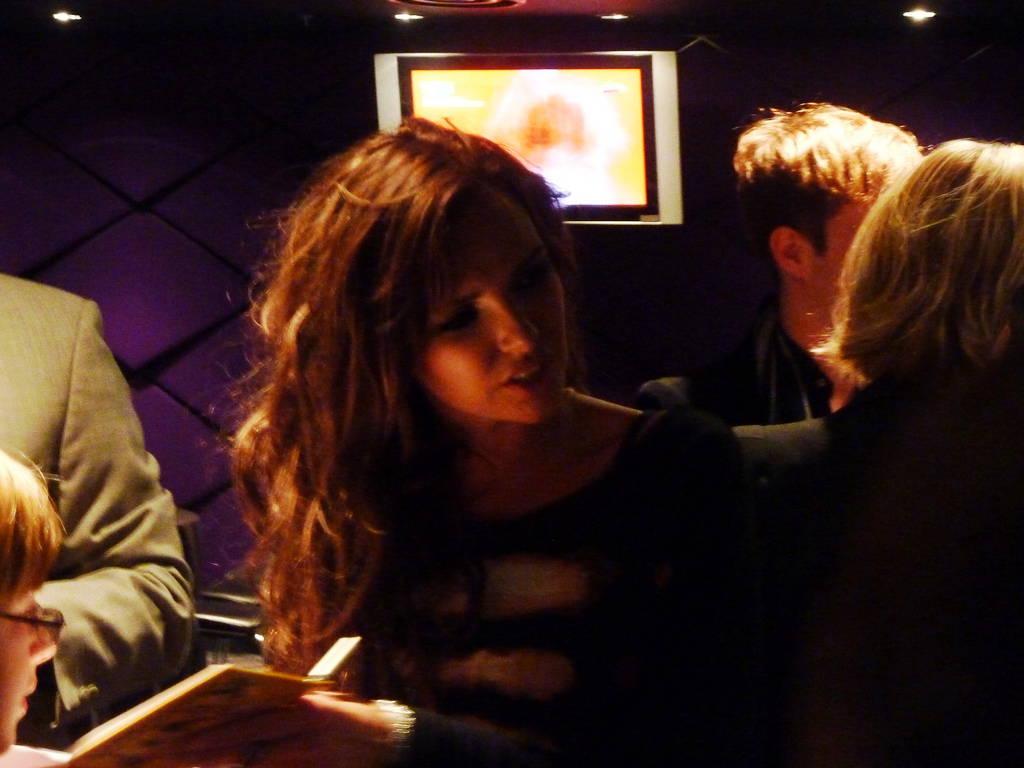
Coyle after show in 2009

In 2009, Girls Aloud decided they would partake in a hiatus to pursue solo projects. That same year, Coyle collaborated with Boyz II Men for their album Love, recording a cover of the Take That song "Back for Good", although the song was cut from the final track listing. Coyle also worked with Jay Sean, although the duet was later scrapped.

Coyle announced plans to release a solo album during Girls Aloud's hiatus. She enlisted Barbara Charone, who has worked with Madonna and Christina Aguilera, as a publicist and Bruce Garfield as her manager. Early reports indicated three major record labels interested in Coyle, In April 2010, it was reported she had signed to Geffen Records. The deal later fell through. In August 2010, Coyle officially signed a deal with grocery store chain Tesco's new record label, releasing the album through her own Black Pen Records imprint.

She worked with a number of famous songwriters and producers during recording sessions, such as Desmond Child, Guy Chambers, Mike Elizondo, Steve Booker, Toby Gad, Tony Kanal and newcomer Ricci Riccardi. According to an interview with Booker, Coyle had worked on song ideas using GarageBand which she then presented to Booker in England to work on together further. The producer said, "She was singing her songs to loops, and then I took the loops out and rewrote the music from scratch to her ideas." He described her songs as "very pop". Booker also worked on songs to show off Coyle's vocals: "Because she's got such a belting voice, I tried a couple of things where she could really belt," he said.

The album was preceded by the release of her debut single, the title track "Insatiable". Co-written with Guy Chambers and produced by Ricci Riccardi, the song has an "80s feel" and "a harder, guitar-led sound." The single peaked at number twenty-six in the UK Singles Chart.

In November 2012, Coyle reunited with the rest of Girls Aloud to celebrate their tenth anniversary. On 18 November 2012, the band released their new single "Something New" which was also the official charity single for Children in Need. The group released their second greatest hits compilation Ten on 26 November 2012. Coyle and the group embarked on the Ten: The Hits Tour in February. After the tour's conclusion in March 2013, the group announced that they were disbanding.

=== 2015–present: Nadine and new projects ===
In late June, Coyle appeared on ITV's Michael Flatley: A Night to Remember, as part of ITV Music Specials. On the programme she sang a cover of "Dangerous Games", shortly thereafter she announced she would star alongside Flatley on his 2014 tour on select dates. Coyle, in August, also revealed she has been in the studio recording new songs for a forthcoming second studio album.

On 16 September 2014, Coyle announced that she began working with longtime collaborator Brian Higgins. In March 2015, Coyle spoke about the details concerning her second album, stating that she intended on signing with a major label and that the sound is "similar" to that of London Grammar. Later that year, Nadine recorded a duet with Shane Filan from the band Westlife for his album Right Here. They performed the single, titled "I Could Be" together on that year's annual Children in Need telethon.

In July 2017, it was announced that Coyle had signed a recording deal with Virgin EMI Records. She released her new single, "Go to Work", on 8 September 2017. In February 2018, it was announced that Coyle will release a four-track EP Nadine in April 2018. "Girls on Fire" was the first track to be released from the EP, on 8 February 2018.

Coyle announced a seven-date tour, touring the UK and Ireland in May 2018. The tour was cancelled without reschedule in April 2018, a month before commencing, with Coyle stating it was becoming "impossible to achieve" what they had wanted to do and that the cancellation was "definitely a lesson" for her. In 2019, Coyle returned to the music scene with her summer anthem "Fool for Love", produced by Brian Higgins of Xenomania. In December of that year, Coyle announced another track called "All That I Know" which was released in 2020.

In October 2022, Nadine sang a cover of the Cranberries classic "Zombie", as it was voted the number 1 Irish song of all time by RTE2FM listeners. Her performance gathered great reviews.

In July 2023, Coyle attended the European premiere of Barbie and released a new single, a cover of Snow Patrol's classic "Chasing Cars". Coyle's version is titled "If I Lay Here (Chasing Cars)".

In May and June 2024, Coyle and her Girls Aloud bandmates got back together for an arena tour titled The Girls Aloud Show in memory of their late bandmate Sarah Harding.

== Other ventures ==
As a member of Girls Aloud, Coyle has also appeared in the fly on the wall documentary Girls Aloud: Home Truths, the E4 documentary series Girls Aloud: Off the Record and a one-off variety show entitled The Girls Aloud Party. Coyle made a cameo appearance in Natasha Bedingfield's video for "I Wanna Have Your Babies".

Coyle contributed to the book Dreams that Glitter - Our Story, an autobiography with her Girls Aloud bandmates, in October 2008. The book was written with a ghostwriter and published by the Transworld imprint Bantam Press. The book featured unseen photographs and included insights into the members' personal lives, their success together, style tips and "everything we've learned about life, love and music."

As a member of Girls Aloud, Coyle has also endorsed Barbie, KitKat, Nintendo DS, Samsung, Sunsilk and Pandora.

In December 2009, Coyle visited her hometown of Derry to successfully break the record of the most trees planted in one site in an hour by 100 volunteers. Coyle has also dedicated some of her time to charities, including the Northern Ireland children's hospice.

Coyle published her new record label Black Pen Records, which additionally released her debut album Insatiable and her further singles. In 2012, Coyle served as a guest judge for an episode of the series America's Next Top Model.

In March 2018, Coyle appeared in Fabulous Magazine with a cover photo shoot and feature interview where she discussed life after Girls Aloud.

In 2019, Coyle participated in the nineteenth series of I'm a Celebrity...Get Me Out of Here! and finished in fifth place.

== Personal life ==
Coyle had a cancer scare when she found a lump in her breast when she was 17; the lump proved to be benign.

In 2006, Coyle relocated from Northern Ireland to Los Angeles, California to be with US actor Jesse Metcalfe, the relationship ended after two and a half years. The move led to her constantly commuting back and forth between the US and the UK for her projects with Girls Aloud and as a solo artist. While living in Los Angeles, Coyle opened an Irish pub restaurant in Sunset Beach, California named Nadine's Irish Mist in 2008 as a family business, which would allow family members to live near her and help her run the business. In 2013, her estimated wealth was £6 million according to that year's Sunday Times Rich List.

On 15 August 2013, Coyle announced on her Instagram account that she was expecting a child. She further confirmed her reunion with ex-fiancé Jason Bell, who is the father of her daughter. Their daughter, Anaíya Bell, was born on 10 February 2014.

In 2015, after nine years in Los Angeles, Coyle closed down Nadine's Irish Mist and moved back to Northern Ireland to raise her daughter Anaíya. She stated that she decided to close the restaurant as the business gradually took a toll on her overworked family members and that she was tired of being approached by film and television producers who wanted to use the restaurant for their projects. She also stated that she was becoming homesick for Northern Ireland while living in Los Angeles.

Coyle and Bell split in 2019 "due to their increasingly distanced lives", as Bell remained in the United States when Coyle returned to Northern Ireland. However, by 2021 the two were living together in Northern Ireland to allow Bell to co-parent Anaíya during the COVID-19 pandemic.

== Discography ==
=== Studio albums ===
List of albums, with selected chart positions
Title	Details	Peak chart positions		
Title	Details	IRL	SCO	UK
Insatiable	Released: 8 November 2010; Label: Black Pen, Tesco; Formats: CD, digital download	20	51	47

=== Extended plays ===
List of EPs
Title	Details
Nadine	Released: 22 March 2018; Label: Virgin EMI; Formats: Digital download

=== Singles ===
==== Lead ====
List of singles, with selected chart positions
Title	Year	Peak chart positions			Album
Title	Year	IRL	SCO	UK	Album
"Insatiable"	2010	20	23	26	Insatiable
"Sweetest High"	2011	—	—	—	Non-album singles
"Go to Work"	2017	—	52	— (Note: "Go to Work" did not enter the Official Singles Chart, but peaked at number 57 on the Official Singles Sales Chart, which counts only paid-for sales in the UK.)	Non-album singles
"Fool for Love"	2019	—	—	—	Non-album singles
"All That I Know"	2020	—	62	—	Non-album singles
"If I Lay Here (Chasing Cars)"	2023	—	—	—	Non-album singles
"—" denotes album that did not chart or was not released

==== Collaborations ====
List of non-single guest appearances, with other performing artists, showing year released and album name
Title	Year	Album
"I Could Be" (with Shane Filan)	2015	Right Here

== Filmography ==
Television
Year	Title	Role	Notes
2001	Irish Popstars	Herself/Contestant	Reality TV Series; Left because she was underage.
2002	Popstars: The Rivals	Contestant/Herself/Competitor	Reality TV series; 1st place
2005	Girls Aloud: Home Truths	Herself	Reality TV series; Documentary
2006	Girls Aloud: Off the Record	Herself	Reality TV series; Documentary
2007	The Friday Night Project	Herself	Co-Presenter
2008	The Passions of Girls Aloud	Herself	Reality TV series; Documentary
2008	The Girls Aloud Party	Co-presenter	Special TV show
2012	America's Next Top Model	Mentor/Judge	"Jessica Sutta and Nadine Coyle" (Episode 6; Season 18)
2012	Girls Aloud: Ten Years at the Top	Herself	Documentary
2013	Pop Life, I'm in a Girl Group!	Herself	Documentary; Episode 2 of 3
2013	Ten: The Hits Tour	Herself	Girls Aloud live from the O2 Arena and last interview as a group.
2014	Michael Flatley: A Night To Remember	Herself - Singer	Special TV show
2018	The Horne Section	Guest Performer	Special TV show
2018, 2019, 2020	Celebrity Juice	Herself	TV panel show
2019	Soft Border Patrol	Herself	Mockumentary
2019	Saturday Kitchen	Herself	Cooking show
2019	Living With Lucy	Herself	Documentary
2019	The Hit List	Herself	Children in Need special
2019	I'm a Celebrity...Get Me Out of Here!	Herself	Contestant; Series 19
2021	The Great Celebrity Bake Off For Stand Up to Cancer	Herself	Contestant of Series 4; Celebrity Baking Competition
2021	Last Singer Standing	Herself	Judge
2021	RuPaul's Drag Race UK	Herself	Special guest; Series 3
2025	RuPaul's Drag Race UK	Herself	Guest judge; Series 7

Film
Year	Title	Role	Notes
1999	Surfing with William	Young girl	Supporting role
2007	St Trinian's	Herself	Supporting role
2014	Lord of the Dance: Dangerous Games	Erin the Goddess	Supporting role
2017	Pin Cushion	Air Hostess	Supporting role

== See also ==
- List of I'm a Celebrity...Get Me Out of Here! (British TV series) contestants
