= Mali-Koa Hood =

Australian singer-songwriter

Mali-Koa
- Also known as: AR/CO
- Born: May 19, 1991 (age 35); Sydney, Australia
- Origin: London, England, United Kingdom
- Occupations: Singer; Songwriter; Musician
- Years active: 2016–present
- Labels: Island Records, Honest Records
- Website: https://www.malikoa.com/

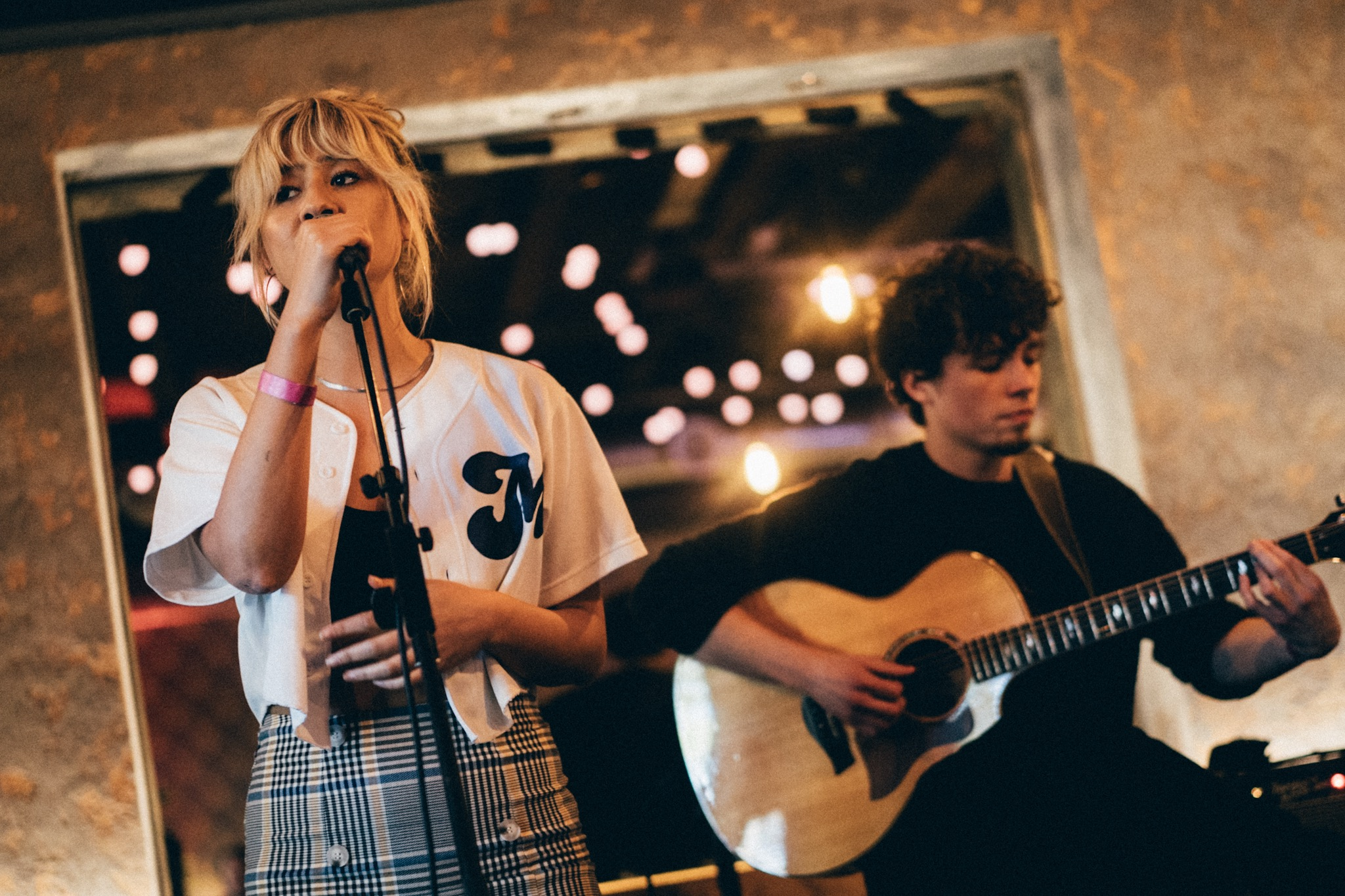
Mali-Koa Hood performing at the Aussie BBQ event in 2019.

Mali-Koa Hood, often credited as Mali-Koa, is an Australian singer and songwriter based in London, England.

== History ==
In April 2012, at the age of 20, Hood competed in the first season of the singing competition series, The Voice Australia. She covered "American Boy" for her blind audition and did a duet cover of "What's Up?" before being eliminated in the battle rounds portion of the show.

On 22 December 2017, Hood released her debut solo song and promotional single, "Honest". The song received over 2 million streams. In March 2018, Hood announced that she had signed a record deal with Island Records UK and revealed that she would be releasing an album.

On 26 July 2018, Hood was featured on a remix of JP Cooper's song "All This Love". The song received national radio play and was later featured on the fifth season of the British reality series, Love Island. As of July 2020, the song's official music video has received over 15 million views on YouTube and over 9 million streams on Spotify.

On 7 December 2018, Hood released "Pretend", her first song released via Island Records. In May 2019, Hood performed at The Great Escape festival in London. On 31 May 2019, Hood released a song titled "Sorry" with the track's accompanying music video being released on 12 June. The song's official music video has since received 2.5 million views on YouTube.

In March 2020, Hood performed at the Global APRA Music Awards in London. On 22 April 2020, Hood released "Dancer", the first single from her upcoming album, set for release later in the year. The song's accompanying music video was released the same day. On 4 June 2020, Hood released the album's second single, titled "Some Things", premiering the song on Atwood Magazine. On 9 July 2020. Hood released the album's third single, "Me Before You". The song's music video was released on 29 July 2020. In August 2020, the singer-songwriter released a cover of Robin S's "Show Me Love" and in February 2021, a cover of the song "You're the Voice" by the Australian icon John Farnham.

Mali-Koa is a grammy nominated songwriter. Her credits include writing on the work of G-Eazy, Marshmello, Tiesto, Subfocus, Gryffin, KX5 and Alan Walker.

She is part of a rising electro duo called AR/CO with fellow musician Leo Stannard.

== Discography ==
=== Studio albums ===
Title	Details
Hunger	Released: 20 November 2020; Label: Honest Records; Formats: Digital download

=== Singles ===
Year	Title	Album	Label
2017	"Numbers Game" (H Block Ink featuring Mali-Koa)		
2017	"Honest"	Hunger	
2018	"All This Love" (JP Cooper featuring Mali-Koa)	Raised Under Grey Skies	Island Records
2018	"Pretend"	Hunger	Honest Records Island Records
2019	"Sorry"	Hunger	Honest Records Island Records
2020	"Dancer"	Hunger	Honest Records Island Records
2020	"Some Things"	Hunger	Honest Records Island Records
2020	"Me Before You"	Hunger	Honest Records Island Records
2020	"Revolution"	Hunger	Honest Records Island Records
2020	"Hunger"	Hunger	Honest Records Island Records
2021	"Higher Than Before" (Flawes featuring Mali-Koa)	Fawes EP: Reverie	Red Bull Records
2022	"Sparks" (Meduza, DEL-30 featuring Mali-Koa)		Anjunabeats
2024	"Sorry" (Headrow, Mali-Koa)		Radiance Records (UK)

=== Song credits ===
Year	Title	Artist	Album	Notes
2017	"The Beautiful & Damned"	G-Eazy	"The Beautiful & Damned"	Composer
2019	"Sleeping Through Sirens"	Ben Hazlewood	Non album single	Composer
2021	"No Control"	Piero Pirupa	No Control	Composer, Vocals
2021	"Run Run"	Will Clarke, Jaded, AR/CO		Composer, Vocals
2021	"Hot Air Baloon"	Don Diablo, AR/CO		Composer, Vocals
2021	"Check Out"	J.Worra feat. Leo Stannard		Composer
2022	"Under The Sun"	Franky Wah, AR/CO		Composer, Vocals
2022	"Tears In Ibiza"	The Stickmen Project, AR/CO		Composer, Vocals
2022	"Call Me By My Name"	AR/CO		Composer, Vocals
2022	"GIANTS"	Tiggi Hawke		Composer, Lyricist
2022	"Night Feels"	AR/CO		Composer, Vocals
2022	"Supersonic L.U.V"	AR/CO		Composer, Vocals
2022	"Sparks" and "Sparks - Extended Mix"	MEDUZA, DEL-30, Mali-Koa		Composer, Vocals
2023	"Vibration (One More Time)"	Sub Focus ft. AR/CO		Composer, Vocals
2023	"Bright Lights"	Kx5 ft. AR/CO		Composer, Vocals
2023	"Wake N' Shake"	220 KID, AR/CO		Composer, Vocals
2023	"Back Around"	Tiësto, AR/CO		Composer, Vocals
2023	"MOVE"	AR/CO		Composer, Vocals
2023	"We Could Be Love"	AR/CO		Composer, Vocals
2023	"All Over The World"	AR/CO		Composer, Vocals
2024	"Sorry"	Headrow, Mali-Koa		Vocals, Composer
2024	"Cherry Lips"	AR/CO		Composer, Vocals
2024	"We Could Be Love"	Hayden James, AR/CO	We Could Be Love	Composer, Vocals
2024	"Fantasy"	Cosmo's Midnight feat. Franc Moody	Stop Thinking Start Feeling	Composer
2024	"The Feeling"	Rudimental, 1991, PNAU, AR/CO	RUDIM3NTAL	Composer, Vocals
2025	"Incommunicado"	Alan Walker, AR/CO	Walkerworld 2.0	
2025	"Worlds Apart"	Marshmello, AR/CO		
2025	"Higher Power"	Gryffin, Lavern, AR/CO		

== Awards ==
Year	Award	Category	Nominated	Result	Ref
2018	Spark Animation Festival Awards	Best Video	"All The Love" (with JP Cooper)	Won	
