= September Song (JP Cooper song) =

Single by JP Cooper

Single by JP Cooper

from the album Raised Under Grey Skies
- Released: 16 September 2016
- Recorded: 2016
- Genre: Pop; tropical house
- Length: 3:40
- Label: Island
- Songwriters: John Paul Cooper; Benjamin McIldowie; Jon Cobbe Hume
- Producers: Teemu Brunila; Mike Spencer (add.)

JP Cooper singles chronology
"Party" (2016)	"September Song" (2016)	"Passport Home" (2017)

Music video
- "September Song" on YouTube

"September Song" is a song by English singer JP Cooper. It is the second single from his debut studio album, Raised Under Grey Skies (2017). The song was released as a digital download in the United Kingdom on 16 September 2016 through Island Records. The song has peaked at number 7 on the UK Singles Chart, and has also reached the top 10 in both Ireland and Sweden. The song was written by Cooper, Jon Hume, Alex Bunker and Mr Hudson.

== Background ==
Talking about the song, Cooper said, "'September Song' in a nutshell is a nostalgic, innocent look at a teenage romance – probably one of your first romances. Looking back as an adult now at how simple things were back then, having those moments of, like, 'I wonder what that person is doing now.' In the UK, September is when you go back to school after the holiday. So that's the idea, this person has been missing this girl all summer – she's a September song, that's what he's looking forward to. We just wanted to write a song that was really sweet and innocent, it wasn't over-sexualized or anything like that."

== Music video ==
A video to accompany the release of "September Song" was first released onto YouTube on 28 November 2016 at a total length of three minutes and thirty-five seconds.

== Track listing ==
Digital download
No.	Title	Length
1.	"September Song"	3:40

Digital download – Remixes EP
No.	Title	Length
1.	"September Song" (guitar acoustic)	3:32
2.	"September Song" (piano acoustic)	3:35
3.	"September Song" (Don Corleon Remix)	3:50
4.	"September Song" (Indian Summer Mix)	3:35

== Charts ==
=== Weekly charts ===
Chart (2016–17)	Peak position
Australia (ARIA)	99
Austria (Ö3 Austria Top 40)	42
Belgium (Ultratop 50 Flanders)	17
Belgium (Ultratip Bubbling Under Wallonia)	10
Czech Republic Singles Digital (ČNS IFPI)	27
Denmark (Tracklisten)	20
France (SNEP)	153
Germany (GfK)	40
Hungary (Rádiós Top 40)	29
Ireland (IRMA)	7
Italy (FIMI)	66
Netherlands (Dutch Top 40)	13
Netherlands (Single Top 100)	16
Portugal (AFP)	54
Scottish Singles Sales (Official Charts)	4
Slovakia Singles Digital (ČNS IFPI)	35
Sweden (Sverigetopplistan)	16
Switzerland (Schweizer Hitparade)	29
UK Singles (Official Charts)	7
US Adult Pop Airplay (Billboard)	38

=== Year-end charts ===
Chart (2017)	Position
Belgium (Ultratop Flanders)	56
Denmark (Tracklisten)	54
France (SNEP)	197
Latvia Airplay (LaIPA)	64
Netherlands (Dutch Top 40)	68
Netherlands (Single Top 100)	47
UK Singles (Official Charts Company)	29

== Certifications ==
Region	Certification	Certified units/sales
Australia (ARIA)	Gold	35,000^{‡}
Belgium (BRMA)	Gold	10,000^{‡}
Brazil (Pro-Música Brasil)	Platinum	60,000^{‡}
Canada (Music Canada)	Gold	40,000^{‡}
Denmark (IFPI Danmark)	2× Platinum	180,000^{‡}
France (SNEP)	Platinum	200,000^{‡}
Germany (BVMI)	Gold	200,000^{‡}
Italy (FIMI)	Platinum	50,000^{‡}
Netherlands (NVPI)	Platinum	40,000^{‡}
New Zealand (RMNZ)	3× Platinum	90,000^{‡}
Spain (Promusicae)	Platinum	60,000^{‡}
Sweden (GLF)	2× Platinum	80,000^{‡}
United Kingdom (BPI)	3× Platinum	1,800,000^{‡}
^{‡} Sales+streaming figures based on certification alone.

== Release history ==
Region	Date	Format	Label
United Kingdom	16 September 2016	Digital download	Island

== Nadine Coyle version ==
"September Song"

Song by Nadine Coyle

from the EP Nadine
- Released: 9 March 2018
- Recorded: 2017
- Length: 3:31
- Label: Virgin EMI
- Songwriters: John Paul Cooper; Benjamin McIldowie; Jon Cobbe Hume
- Producers: Xenomania, COMMANDS

In 2018, Irish recording artist Nadine Coyle released a cover of "September Song". The cover, the third track from Coyle's Nadine EP, was released as a digital download on 9 March 2018 by Virgin EMI Records.
