= Passport Home =

Single by JP Cooper

from the album Raised Under Grey Skies
- Released: 7 April 2017
- Recorded: 2016
- Genre: Pop
- Length: 3:00
- Label: Island Records
- Songwriter(s): John Paul Cooper; Jamie Hartman
- Producer(s): Jamie Hartman; David Pramik

JP Cooper singles chronology
"September Song" (2016)	"Passport Home" (2017)	"She's on My Mind" (2017)

Music video
- "Passport Home" on YouTube

"Passport Home" is a song by English singer JP Cooper. It was released as the third single of his debut studio album Raised Under Grey Skies. The song was released as a digital download in the United Kingdom on 7 April 2017 through Island Records. The song has peaked at number 86 on the UK Singles Chart. The song was written by John Paul Cooper and Jamie Hartman.

== Critical reception ==
Josh Gray from Clash said, "With its stacked gospel backing vocals and optimistic chorus, 'Passport Home' sounds like it was tailor-made for tube station buskers who might be worried that people, especially lawyers, are starting to cotton on to just how many Ed Sheeran covers they crank out every day."

== Music video ==
A video to accompany the release of "Passport Home" was first released onto YouTube on 11 May 2017 at a total length of three minutes and twenty seconds.

== Track listing ==
Digital download - Single
No.	Title	Length
1.	"Passport Home"	3:40

Digital download - EP
No.	Title	Length
1.	"Passport Home" (Piano Acoustic)	3:03
2.	"Passport Home" (Guitar Acoustic)	2:58
3.	"Passport Home" (Live Choir Version)	3:02
4.	"Passport Home" (Keep The Light On Mix)	3:09

Digital download - Remix
No.	Title	Length
1.	"Passport Home" (Deepend Remix)	3:22

== Charts ==
Chart (2017)	Peak position
Scotland (Official Charts Company)	30
UK Singles (OCC)	86

== Certifications ==
Region	Certification	Certified units/sales
United Kingdom (BPI)	Silver	200,000^{‡}
^{‡} Sales+streaming figures based on certification alone.

== Release history ==
Region	Date	Format	Label
United Kingdom	7 April 2017	Digital download	Island Records
