= Go to Work =

Single by Nadine Coyle
- Released: 8 September 2017
- Genre: Electropop; house
- Length: 3:30
- Label: Virgin EMI
- Songwriters: Sarah Thompson; Florrie Arnold; Brian Higgins; Keir MacCulloch; Kyle Mackenzie; Ben Taylor; Toby Scott; Kris Ryeland; Nadine Coyle
- Producers: Xenomania; COMMANDS

Nadine Coyle singles chronology
"I Could Be" (2015)	"Go to Work" (2017)	"Fool for Love" (2019)

"Go to Work" is a song by Irish singer Nadine Coyle. The song was released as a digital download on 8 September 2017 by Virgin EMI Records.

== Background and release ==
"Go to Work" is Coyle's first single since the release of "I Could Be" with Shane Filan in 2015, and her first single as the lead artist since "Sweetest High" in 2011.

Coyle announced the single on 23 August 2017, and published a dance rehearsal clip, audio snippet, and music video preview via Twitter to promote the song. The music video was released on 15 September, one week after the track's release. Coyle performed the track live for the first time on 9 September, supporting Noel Gallagher's High Flying Birds at "We Are Manchester", a benefit concert to mark the reopening of Manchester Arena following the bombing in May 2017. On 29 September 2017, Coyle performed "Go to Work" on an episode of Strictly Come Dancing: It Takes Two. She further promoted the song with a non-singing appearance on Channel 4's Sunday Brunch on 1 October 2017.

== Critical reception ==
Ross McNeilage of MTV News described the single as a "90s house-influenced [...] total banger, through and through, that gets the party started while letting Nadine's incredible voice shine". Lewis Corner of Gay Times described it as a "pop banger ready for the weekend" and Justin Myers of Official Charts Company says that the single's "infectious housey piano and incessant beat recalls the golden era of the '90s, while the bang up-to-date production includes elements any pop fan of 2017 would be familiar with – tropical house influences are present and correct, even if the overall vibe is nowhere near as laid-back".

== Formats and track listings ==
These are the formats and track listings of major single releases of "Go to Work".

- Digital download
1. "Go to Work" - 3:30
- Digital download
1. "Go to Work" (DJ Licious Remix) - 3:23
2. "Go to Work" (Team Nouvelle's Holdin' On Remix) - 5:53
3. "Go to Work" (Calvo Remix) - 3:01

== Charts ==
Chart (2017)	Peak position
Scotland Singles (OCC)	52
UK Download (Official Charts Company)	57
