= Raised Under Grey Skies =

Studio album by JP Cooper
- Released: 6 October 2017
- Length: 45:35
- Label: Island
- Producers: Teemu Brunila; Mike Spencer; Hannah Vasanth; Crispin Hunt; Adam Bartlett; Two Inch Punch; Fred Ball; Jamie Hartman; David Pramik; Jon Hume; Hank Solo; Greg Wells; Wesley Muoria-Chaves

JP Cooper chronology
When the Darkness Comes (2015)	Raised Under Grey Skies (2017)	Too Close (2020)

Singles from Raised Under Grey Skies
- 1. "Party" Released: 10 June 2016; 2. "September Song" Released: 16 September 2016; 3. "Passport Home" Released: 7 April 2017; 4. "She's on My Mind" Released: 21 July 2017; 5. "Wait" Released: 25 August 2017; 6. "Momma's Prayers" Released: 15 September 2017; 7. "All This Love" Released: 26 July 2018

Professional ratings
Review scores
Source	Rating
Brig	5/5 stars
The Courier	4/5 stars
The Gryphon	Positive
Hit the Floor	Positive
Hot Press	Positive
The Yorkshire Times	3.0/5 stars

Raised Under Grey Skies is the debut album from English singer and songwriter JP Cooper. It was released on 6 October 2017 by Island Records.

== Track listing ==
Standard edition
No.	Title	Writer(s)	Producer(s)	Length
1.	"We Were Raised Under Grey Skies"	John Paul Cooper; Adriano Buffone	Hannah Vasanth	3:30
2.	"September Song"	Cooper; Teemu Brunila; Benjamin McIldowie; Jon Cobbe Hume	Brunila; Mike Spencer^{[b]}	3:40
3.	"Good Friend"	Cooper; David Bayley; Andrew MacFarlane; Edmund Irwin-Singer; Joe Seaward; Benjamin Ash; Frederik Ball	Two Inch Punch; Ball	2:57
4.	"All This Love (Featuring Mali-Koa Hood)"	Cooper; Brunila	Brunila	3:14
5.	"The Only Reason"	Cooper	Brunila	3:40
6.	"Passport Home"	Cooper; Jamie Hartman	Hartman; David Pramik^{[b]}	3:00
7.	"She's on My Mind"	Cooper; Brunila; McIldowie; Hume	Spencer; Hume; Brunila^{[b]}	2:58
8.	"Wait"	Cooper; Mark Taylor; Patrick Mascall	Brunila; Hank Solo^{[a]}	3:52
9.	"Change"	Cooper; Alex Smith	Brunila; Solo^{[a]}	3:48
10.	"Closer"	Cooper; Joseph Murphy; Jonathan Howard	Brunila; Spencer	3:03
11.	"Beneath the Streetlights and the Moon"	Cooper; Greg Wells	Brunila; Wells^{[b]}	3:34
12.	"In the Silence"	Cooper; Brunila	Brunila	3:19
13.	"Momma's Prayers" (with Stormzy)	Cooper; Vasanth; Michael Omari Jr.	Vasanth	5:05
Total length:				45:35

Deluxe edition
No.	Title	Writer(s)	Producer(s)	Length
14.	"Masterpiece"	Cooper; Afshin Salmani; Josh Cumbee	Crispin Hunt; Adam Bartlett^{[a]}	3:38
15.	"Tidal Wave"	Cooper; Hunt	Brunila	3:32
16.	"Party"	Cooper; Brunila	Brunila	3:23
17.	"Lost Boy Dreaming"	Cooper	Hunt; Bartlett^{[a]}	3:44
18.	"Passport Home" (piano acoustic)	Cooper; Hartman	Hartman; Pramik^{[b]}	3:03
19.	"September Song" (guitar acoustic)	Cooper; Brunila; McIldowie; Hume	Brunila; Spencer^{[b]}	3:32
20.	"Perfect Strangers" (band version)	Guy James Robin; Cooper; Smith	Wesley Muoria-Chaves	3:46

Notes

- [a] signifies a co-producer
- [b] signifies an additional producer

== Charts ==
Chart (2017)	Peak position
Belgian Albums (Ultratop Flanders)	41
Dutch Albums (Album Top 100)	40
Irish Albums (IRMA)	21
Scottish Albums (Official Charts)	10
Swiss Albums (Schweizer Hitparade)	53
UK Albums (Official Charts)	9

== Certifications ==
Region	Certification	Certified units/sales
Denmark (IFPI Danmark)	Platinum	20,000^{‡}
New Zealand (RMNZ)	Platinum	15,000^{‡}
United Kingdom (BPI)	Gold	100,000^{‡}
^{‡} Sales+streaming figures based on certification alone.
