= JP Cooper =

British singer (born 1983)

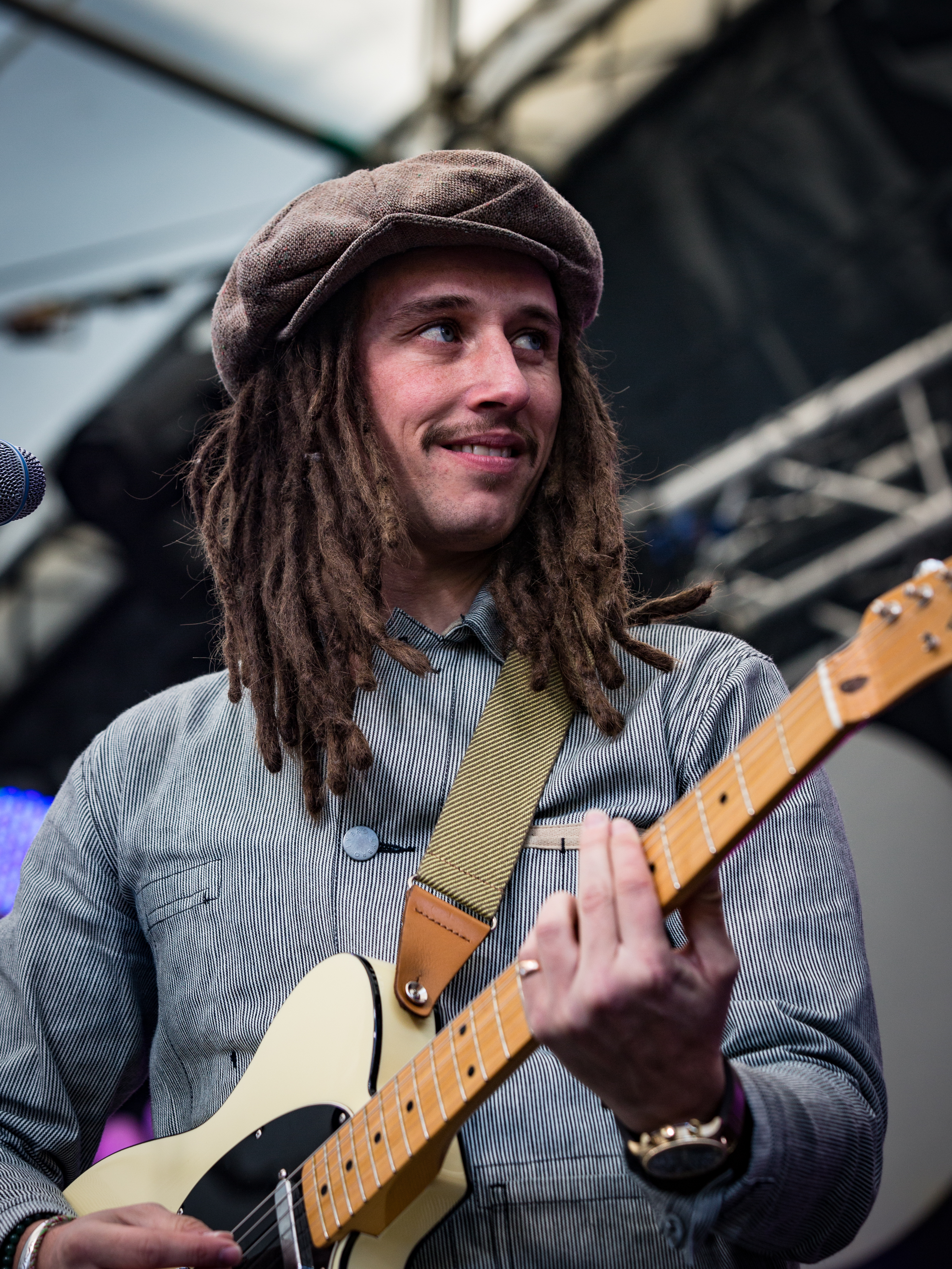
- Cooper in September 2017

Background information
- Born: John Paul Cooper; 1 November 1983 (age 42); Middleton, Greater Manchester, England
- Genres: Soul; alternative rock; tropical house
- Occupations: Singer; musician; songwriter
- Instruments: Vocals; guitar
- Years active: 2012–present
- Label: Island Records
- Website: jpcoopermusic.com

John Paul Cooper (born 1 November 1983) is an English singer and songwriter. He is best known for featuring on the single "Perfect Strangers" by Jonas Blue. The song was certified platinum in the UK. His follow-up solo single was "September Song". He is signed to Island Records.

== Career ==
=== 2002–2006: access to music ===
In 2002, Cooper studied Contemporary Popular Music at North Trafford College, based at Beehive Mill in Manchester. There, he joined a band called Kid Conspiracy, which later changed its name to Azure Glow. They grew a small following locally and enjoyed limited success, releasing self made EPs including December Falls and Listen. They ultimately disbanded following their last UK tour in 2006.

=== 2012–2015: career beginnings ===
On 27 June 2012, Cooper released his first two extended plays EP1 and EP2. He featured on Don Diablo's single "The Artist Inside", which was released on 9 November 2012. He released his third extended play, EP3 on 8 February 2013. On 20 July 2014, he released his fourth extended play Keep the Quiet Out. He released his fifth extended play, When the Darkness Comes on 26 January 2015.

=== 2016–2018: Raised Under Grey Skies ===
On 18 March 2016, Cooper released the single "Five More Days", featuring vocals from Avelino. He featured on Jonas Blue's single "Perfect Strangers", which was released on 3 June 2016. The song peaked at number 2 on the UK Singles Chart, and reached the top ten positions in eight additional countries, including Germany, Australia and Sweden.

On 10 June 2016, Cooper released the single "Party" as the lead single from his debut studio album. He released "September Song" on 16 September 2016 as the second single. The song peaked at number 7 on the UK Singles Chart, and also reached the top 10 in the Republic of Ireland and Sweden. "Passport Home" was released as the third single on 7 April 2017, peaking at number 86 on the UK Singles Chart. On 21 July 2017, Cooper released "She's on My Mind" as the fourth single. "Wait" was released as the fifth single on 25 August 2017. He eventually released the album, Raised Under Grey Skies on 6 October 2017.

He was also featured on Craig David's seventh studio album The Time Is Now on the song "Get Involved", which was released on 26 January 2018.

=== 2018–present: She and Just a Few Folk ===
On 16 June 2018, he played at Pinkpop, a festival in the Netherlands. On 26 July 2018, Cooper released "All This Love", featuring singer-songwriter Mali-Koa Hood. In August 2019, he collaborated with Gabrielle Aplin on her song "Losing Me" and in November that same year he collaborated with Stefflon Don. Cooper's second album, She, was released on 21 February 2022.

Cooper brought out his third album, Just a Few Folk, in February 2026. Looking back on previous chart success and attending award ceremonies, he told Headliner Hub: "Looking back, I don’t really care about that anymore. I love a Wetherspoons – I don’t need bougie hipster coffee or a members’ club. There’s no real culture in those places. I love the council estate greasy spoon with a Greek family running it, where you can get bacon and eggs and a bit of kebab on the side if you fancy it. That’s where you find stories and culture."

== Personal life ==
Cooper married Lauren (née Foster) in August 2019. They have two children.

== Discography ==
- Raised Under Grey Skies (2017)
- She (2022)
- Just a Few Folk (2026)
