= Girls Aloud discography =

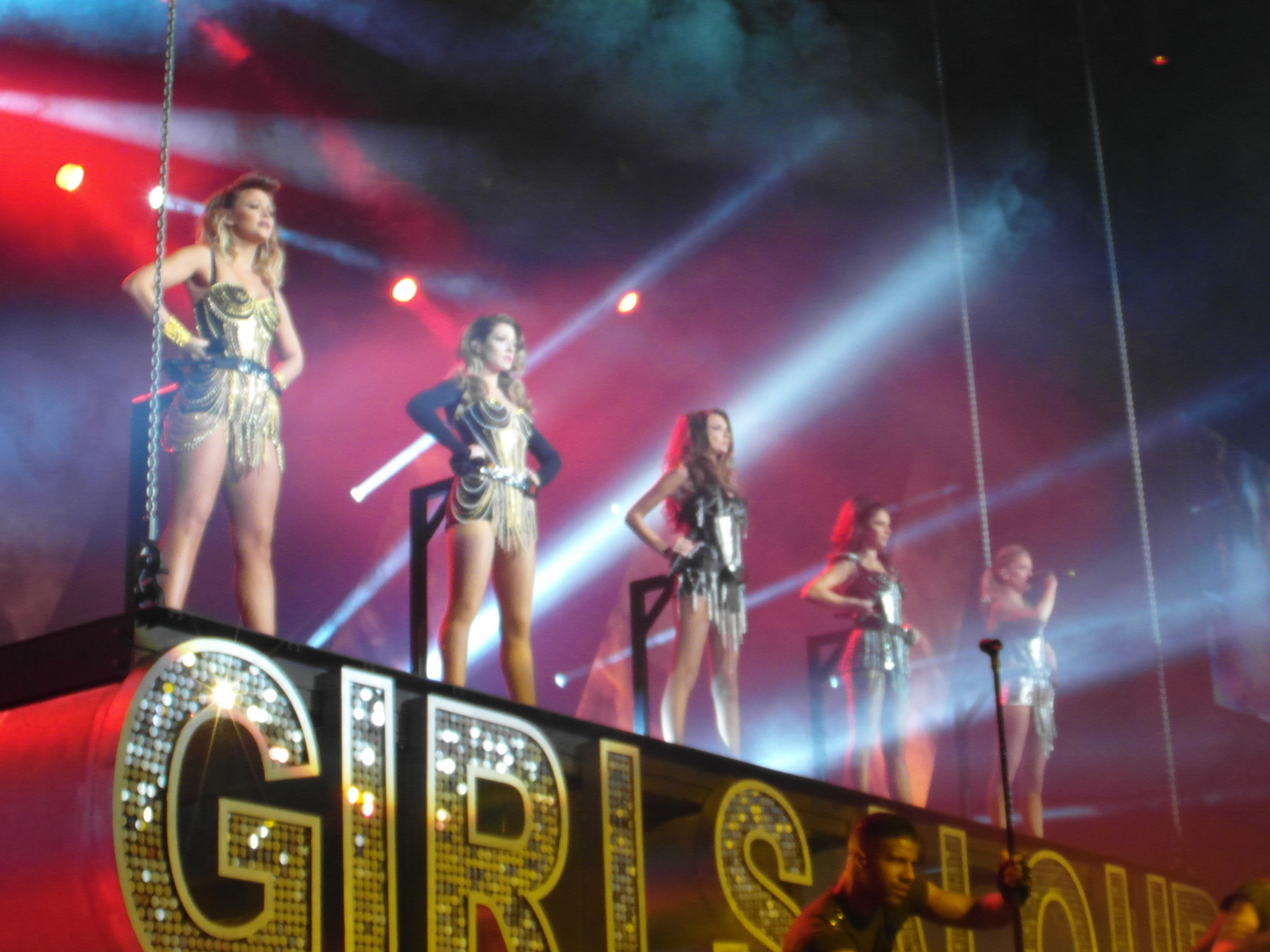
- Girls Aloud in 2013
- Studio albums: 5
- Live albums: 2
- Compilation albums: 2
- Singles: 24
- Remix albums: 1
- Extended plays: 2
- Box sets: 2
- Video albums: 11
- Promotional singles: 2
- Music videos: 25

The discography of British-Irish girl group Girls Aloud consists of five studio albums, two compilation albums, twenty-four singles, two promotional singles, two live albums, one remix album, two box sets, eleven video albums and twenty-five music videos.

Girls Aloud was formed in 2002 on the ITV1 talent show Popstars: The Rivals. Viewers voted for Cheryl Tweedy, Nicola Roberts, Nadine Coyle, Kimberley Walsh and Sarah Harding to be members of the group. The following month they won the programme by claiming the coveted Christmas number one ahead of the male group formed on the show, One True Voice. They released their debut single, "Sound of the Underground", which became the Christmas number-one on both the UK Singles Chart and Irish Singles Chart. Their second single, "No Good Advice", was released on both CD and DVD single formats in May 2003. A week later, the group released their debut album, Sound of the Underground, which was certified platinum by the British Phonographic Industry (BPI). The third single to be taken from the album was "Life Got Cold". Their fourth single, "Jump", a cover version of "Jump (for My Love)" by the Pointer Sisters, was taken from the soundtrack for the film Love Actually, and appeared on the re-issue of Sound of the Underground.

What Will the Neighbours Say?, the group's second album, was released in November 2004 and produced four singles, "The Show", "Love Machine", "I'll Stand by You", and "Wake Me Up". Preceded by the singles "Long Hot Summer" and "Biology", their third album, Chemistry, was released in December 2005. It is their lowest-charting album to date, although it was still certified platinum in the UK. The following year, Girls Aloud released their first compilation album, The Sound of Girls Aloud: The Greatest Hits, which included their first twelve singles and three new songs, two of which, "Something Kinda Ooooh" and "I Think We're Alone Now", were released as singles. March 2007 saw the release of "Walk This Way", a charity single for Comic Relief, performed in collaboration with Sugababes.

In November 2007, the album Tangled Up was released and entered the UK Albums Chart at number four. It was preceded by the lead single, "Sexy! No No No...". The group's nineteenth single, "The Promise", was released in October 2008, and entered the UK and Irish Singles Charts at numbers one and two respectively. It was taken from Out of Control, their fifth studio album, which was released on 31 October 2008 in Ireland and 2 November in the UK. "The Loving Kind" was released on 12 January 2009 in the UK and peaked at number ten in the UK, becoming their 20th consecutive top-10 single, while "Untouchable" reached number 11, making it their first single to miss the UK top 10. In 2012, the group's second greatest hits album, Ten, was released and entered the UK Albums Chart at number nine. The album yielded two singles, "Something New" and "Beautiful 'Cause You Love Me", which were both released in 2012. Sarah Harding died in 2021. In 2024, the group released "I'll Stand By You (Sarah's version)" for that year's Children in Need; the alternate version features only Harding singing the verses.

As of 2013, Girls Aloud have sold over 4.3 million singles and 4 million albums in the United Kingdom; in the United States, their digital song sales stand at 79,000, while their first four albums have sold 8,000.

== Albums ==
=== Studio albums ===
List of studio albums, with selected chart positions, sales and certifications
| Title | Details | Peak chart positions | | | Sales | Certifications |
| Title | Details | UK | IRE | NLD | Sales | Certifications |
|---|---|---|---|---|---|---|
| Sound of the Underground | Released: 26 May 2003; Label: Polydor; Formats: CD, digital download, LP, streaming | 2 | 6 | 53 | UK: 393,572 (Note: United Kingdom sales figures for Sound of the Underground as of November 2026.) | BPI: Platinum |
| What Will the Neighbours Say? | Released: 29 November 2004; Label: Polydor; Formats: CD, digital download, LP, streaming | 6 | 12 | — | UK: 629,858 (Note: United Kingdom sales figures for What Will the Neighbours Say? as of November 2026.) | BPI: 2× Platinum; IRMA: 2× Platinum |
| Chemistry | Released: 5 December 2005; Label: Polydor; Formats: CD, digital download, LP, streaming | 11 | 31 | — | UK: 413,193 (Note: United Kingdom sales figures for Chemistry as of November 2026.) | BPI: Platinum; IRMA: Platinum |
| Tangled Up | Released: 19 November 2007; Label: Fascination; Formats: CD, digital download, streaming | 4 | 25 | — | UK: 527,720 (Note: United Kingdom sales figures for Tangled Up as of November 2026.) | BPI: Platinum; IRMA: Gold |
| Out of Control | Released: 3 November 2008; Label: Fascination; Formats: CD, digital download, streaming | 1 | 7 | — | UK: 813,518 (Note: United Kingdom sales figures for Out of Control as of November 2026.) | BPI: 2× Platinum; IRMA: 2× Platinum |
"—" denotes album that did not chart or was not released

=== Compilation albums ===
List of compilation albums, with selected chart positions, sales and certifications
| Title | Details | Peak chart positions | | Sales^{[A]} | Certifications |
| Title | Details | UK | IRE | Sales^{[A]} | Certifications |
|---|---|---|---|---|---|
| The Sound of Girls Aloud: The Greatest Hits | Released: 29 October 2006; Label: Fascination; Formats: CD, digital download, streaming | 1 | 9 | UK: 1,287,718 (Note: United Kingdom sales figures for The Sound of Girls Aloud: The Greatest Hits as of November 2026.) | BPI: 4× Platinum; IFPI: Platinum; IRMA: Platinum |
| Ten | Released: 26 November 2012; Label: Fascination; Formats: CD, digital download, streaming | 9 | 10 | UK: 462,729 (Note: United Kingdom sales figures for Ten as of November 2026.) | BPI: Platinum |

=== Live albums ===
List of live albums, with selected chart positions
| Title | Details | Peak chart positions |
| Title | Details | UK |
|---|---|---|
| Girls A Live | Released: 3 November 2008; Label: Fascination; Format: CD, digital download, streaming | 29 |
| Out of Control: Live from the O2 2009 | Released: 5 October 2009; Label: Fascination; Format: CD, digital download, streaming | — |
| The Girls Aloud Show (Live) | Released: 13 June 2025; Label: Mercury Studios; Format: CD, digital download, streaming | — (Note: "The Girls Aloud Show (Live)" did not enter the UK Albums Chart, but debuted at number 44 on the UK Album Downloads Chart on 20 June 2025.) |
"—" denotes album that did not chart or was not released

=== Remix album ===
List of remix albums, with selected chart positions
| Title | Details | Peak chart positions |
| Title | Details | UK |
|---|---|---|
| Mixed Up | Released: 19 November 2007; Label: Fascination; Format: CD, digital download, streaming | 56 |

=== Box sets ===
List of box-sets
| Title | Details | Peak chart positions |
| Title | Details | UK |
|---|---|---|
| Singles Box Set | Released: 22 July 2009; Label: Fascination; Format: CD single box set | — |
| The Collection (Studio/B-Sides/Live) | Released: 27 May 2013; Label: Polydor; Format: CD box set | 165 |

=== Video albums ===
List of video albums
| Title | Details | Notes |
|---|---|---|
| Popstars: The Rivals | Released: 7 December 2002; Studio: 2 Entertain; Format: DVD | Footage of contestants' performances; Interviews with the judges and contestants |
| Girls on Film | Released: 13 June 2005; Studio: Polydor, Universal; Format: DVD | Features their first eight music videos; Performances on CD:UK, Popworld, Top of the Pops and the MTV special Girls Aloud – The Show; Certified gold by the British Phonographic Industry |
| What Will the Neighbours Say? Live in Concert | Released: 7 November 2005; Studio: Polydor, Universal; Format: DVD | Contains the What Will the Neighbours Say...? Tour as shot live in Hammersmith, London on 28 and 29 May 2005; Includes "Long Hot Summer" music video; Certified gold by the British Phonographic Industry |
| Girls Aloud: Off the Record | Released: 28 August 2006; Studio: Channel 4, Universal; Format: DVD | Features all six episodes of the reality television series |
| Girls Aloud: The Greatest Hits Live from Wembley Arena | Released: 13 November 2006; Studio: Polydor, Universal; Format: DVD | Contains the Chemistry Tour live from Wembley Arena, London on 3 June 2006; Includes music video for "Biology", "See the Day" and "Whole Lotta History"; Certified gold by the British Phonographic Industry |
| Get Girls Aloud's Style | Released: 12 November 2007; Studio: Polydor, Universal; Format: DVD | The group discuss their style and give fashion tips; Features their first sixteen music videos |
| Ghosthunting With... Girls Aloud | Released: 6 October 2008; Studio: Antix Productions, ITV; Format: DVD | The episode of paranormal television series Ghost Hunting with..., featuring four of the five members |
| Tangled Up: Live from The O_{2} 2008 | Released: 27 October 2008; Studio: Polydor, Universal; Format: DVD, Blu-ray | Contains the Tangled Up Tour shot live from London's O_{2} Arena on 17 May 2008; Includes music videos for "Sexy! No No No...", "Call the Shots" and "Can't Speak French"; Certified gold by the British Phonographic Industry |
| Out of Control Live from The O_{2} 2009 | Released: 5 October 2009; Studio: Polydor, Universal; Format: DVD, Blu-ray | Contains the Out of Control Tour shot live from London's O_{2} Arena on 24 May 2009; Includes "The Promise", "The Loving Kind" and "Untouchable" music videos; Includes Girl Cam for each of the girls; Includes visuals and an interview with the Girls; Certified gold by the British Phonographic Industry |
| Ten: The Videos | Released: 26 November 2012; Studio: Polydor, Universal; Format: DVD | Contains fifteen music videos for songs from the standard edition of Ten |
| Ten: The Hits Tour | Released: 11 November 2013; Studio: Polydor, Universal; Format: DVD | Contains the live tour to celebrate ten years of Girls Aloud |

== Extended plays ==
List of extended plays
| Title | Details |
|---|---|
| The Whole Damn Show Megamix | Released: 17 May 2024; Label: Polydor, Universal; Format: digital download, streaming |
| Christmas 'Round at Ours | Released: 14 November 2025; Label: Polydor, Universal; Format: CD, digital download, LP, streaming |

== Singles ==
List of singles, showing year released, selected chart positions, sales, certifications and associated album
| Title | Year | Peak chart positions | | | | | | | | | | | Sales | Certifications | Album |
| Title | Year | UK | AUS | BEL (FL) | FRA | GER | IRE | NLD | NZ | SCO | SWE | SWI | Sales | Certifications | Album |
|---|---|---|---|---|---|---|---|---|---|---|---|---|---|---|---|
| "Sound of the Underground" | 2002 | 1 | 31 | 13 | 55 | 42 | 1 | 9 | — | 1 | 39 | 25 | UK: 1,200,000 | BPI: 2× Platinum | Sound of the Underground |
| "No Good Advice" | 2003 | 2 | 88 | 45 | — | — | 2 | 26 | — | 2 | — | — | | BPI: Silver | Sound of the Underground |
| "Life Got Cold" | 2003 | 3 | — | 64 | — | — | 2 | — | — | 2 | — | — | | | Sound of the Underground |
| "Jump" | 2003 | 2 | 23 | 6 | — | — | 2 | 8 | 13 | 2 | 9 | 58 | UK: 499,000 | BPI: Gold | Sound of the Underground |
| "The Show" | 2004 | 2 | 67 | — | — | — | 5 | — | — | 1 | — | — | | | What Will the Neighbours Say? |
| "Love Machine" | 2004 | 2 | — | — | — | — | 9 | 52 | — | 2 | — | — | UK: 694,000 | BPI: Platinum | What Will the Neighbours Say? |
| "I'll Stand by You" | 2004 | 1 | — | — | — | — | 3 | 85 | — | 1 | — | — | | BPI: Silver | What Will the Neighbours Say? |
| "Wake Me Up" | 2005 | 4 | — | — | — | — | 6 | — | — | 4 | — | — | | | What Will the Neighbours Say? |
| "Long Hot Summer" | 2005 | 7 | — | — | — | — | 16 | — | — | 13 | — | — | | | Chemistry |
| "Biology" | 2005 | 4 | 26 | — | — | — | 7 | — | — | 3 | — | — | | BPI: Silver | Chemistry |
| "See the Day" | 2005 | 9 | — | — | — | — | 14 | — | — | 8 | — | — | | | Chemistry |
| "Whole Lotta History" | 2006 | 6 | — | — | — | — | 18 | — | — | 2 | — | — | | | Chemistry |
| "Something Kinda Ooooh" | 2006 | 3 | — | — | — | — | 7 | — | — | 2 | — | — | | BPI: Gold | The Sound of Girls Aloud |
| "I Think We're Alone Now" | 2006 | 4 | — | — | — | — | 11 | — | — | 3 | — | — | | | The Sound of Girls Aloud |
| "Walk This Way" (with Sugababes) | 2007 | 1 | — | — | — | — | 14 | — | — | 1 | — | — | | | Non-album single |
| "Sexy! No No No..." | 2007 | 5 | — | — | — | — | 11 | — | — | 3 | — | — | | BPI: Silver | Tangled Up |
| "Call the Shots" | 2007 | 3 | — | — | — | — | 9 | — | — | 4 | — | — | UK: 520,000 | BPI: Gold | Tangled Up |
| "Can't Speak French" | 2008 | 9 | — | — | — | — | 12 | — | — | 3 | — | — | | BPI: Silver | Tangled Up |
| "The Promise" | 2008 | 1 | — | — | — | — | 2 | — | — | 3 | — | — | UK: 860,000 | BPI: Platinum | Out of Control |
| "The Loving Kind" | 2009 | 10 | — | — | — | — | 16 | — | — | 2 | — | — | | BPI: Silver | Out of Control |
| "Untouchable" | 2009 | 11 | — | — | — | — | 19 | — | — | 2 | — | — | | | Out of Control |
| "Something New" | 2012 | 2 | — | — | — | — | 4 | — | — | 2 | — | — | | BPI: Silver | Ten |
| "Beautiful 'Cause You Love Me" | 2012 | 97 | — | — | — | — | 80 | — | — | 75 | — | — | | | Ten |
| "I'll Stand by You" (Sarah's version) | 2024 | — (Note: "I'll Stand by You" (Sarah's version) did not enter the UK Singles Chart Top 100, but debuted and peaked at number 2 on the UK Singles Downloads and the UK Singles Sales charts, respectively.) | — | — | — | — | — | — | — | — | — | — | | | Non-album single |
| "Not Tonight Santa" | 2025 | — | — | — | — | — | — | — | — | — | — | — | | | Christmas 'Round at Ours |
"—" denotes singles that did not chart or were not released

=== Promotional singles ===
List of promotional singles, showing year released, selected chart positions and associated album
| Title | Year | Peak chart positions | Album |
| Title | Year | UK | Album |
|---|---|---|---|
| "Theme to St. Trinian's" | 2008 | 51 | St Trinian's |
| "Singapore" | 2025 | — | Chemistry: 20th Anniversary |

== Music videos ==
List of music videos, showing year released and directors
| Title | Year | Directors |
|---|---|---|
| "Sound of the Underground" | 2002 | Phil Griffin |
| "No Good Advice" | 2003 | Phil Griffin |
| "Life Got Cold" | 2003 | Phil Griffin |
| "Jump" | 2003 | Katie Bell |
| "The Show" | 2004 | Trudy Bellinger |
| "Love Machine" | 2004 | Stuart Gosling |
| "I'll Stand by You" | 2004 | Trudy Bellinger |
| "Wake Me Up" | 2005 | Harvey & Carolyn |
| "Long Hot Summer" | 2005 | Max & Dania |
| "Biology" | 2005 | Harvey & Carolyn |
| "See the Day" | 2005 | Harvey & Carolyn |
| "Whole Lotta History" | 2006 | Margaret Malandruccolo |
| "Something Kinda Ooooh" | 2006 | Stuart Gosling |
| "I Think We're Alone Now" | 2006 | Alex Hemming |
| "Walk This Way" | 2007 | Trudy Bellinger |
| "Sexy! No No No..." | 2007 | Trudy Bellinger |
| "Call the Shots" | 2007 | Sean de Sparengo |
| "Theme to St. Trinian's" | 2007 | Trudy Bellinger |
| "Can't Speak French" | 2008 | Petro |
| "The Promise" | 2008 | Trudy Bellinger |
| "The Loving Kind" | 2008 | Trudy Bellinger |
| "Untouchable" | 2009 | Marco Puig |
| "Something New" | 2012 | Ray Kay |
| "Beautiful 'Cause You Love Me" | 2012 | Paul Caslin |

== See also ==
- List of artists who reached number one in Ireland
- List of artists who reached number one on the UK Singles Chart
- List of artists who reached number one on the UK Singles Downloads Chart
- List of artists with the most UK singles chart top tens
- List of best-selling girl groups
