= Ten: The Videos =

Video by Girls Aloud
- Released: 26 November 2012
- Recorded: December 2002 – October 2012
- Genre: Pop
- Length: 55 minutes
- Label: Polydor

Girls Aloud chronology
Out of Control: Live from the O2 2009 (2009)	Ten: The Videos (2012)

Ten: The Videos is a greatest videos DVD compilation by British all-female pop group Girls Aloud. Released by Polydor Records on 26 November 2012, the release accompanied the greatest hits album Ten. The collection is the third music video collection from Girls Aloud, following Girls on Film (2004) and Get Girls Aloud's Style (2007). The DVD features all fifteen of the music videos from the standard edition of Ten, including "Something New". All of the music videos have been previously released on DVD, with the exception of "Something New". The video album charted at number nine on the Official Charts Company's Music Video Chart on 2 December 2012.

== Track listing ==
DVD
No.	Title	Director(s)	Length
1.	"Something New"	Ray Kay	3:20
2.	"The Promise"	Trudy Bellinger	3:43
3.	"The Loving Kind"	Trudy Bellinger	3:59
4.	"Untouchable"	Marco Puig	3:48
5.	"Sexy! No No No..."	Trudy Bellinger	3:18
6.	"Call the Shots"	Sean de Sparengo	3:43
7.	"Can't Speak French"	Petro	3:19
8.	"Something Kinda Ooooh"	Stuart Gosling	3:20
9.	"Biology"	Harvey & Carolyn	3:35
10.	"The Show"	Trudy Bellinger	3:36
11.	"Love Machine"	Stuart Gosling	3:25
12.	"I'll Stand by You"	Trudy Bellinger	3:43
13.	"Jump"	Katie Bell	3:39
14.	"No Good Advice"	Phil Griffin	3:47
15.	"Sound of the Underground"	Phil Griffin	3:41

== Chart ==
Chart (2012)	Peak Position
UK Music Video Chart	10
