= Out of Control (Girls Aloud album) =

2008 studio album by Girls Aloud

Studio album by Girls Aloud
- Released: 31 October 2008 (Ireland)
- Genres: Pop; electropop
- Length: 53:09
- Label: Fascination
- Producers: Brian Higgins; Xenomania

Girls Aloud chronology
Tangled Up (2007)	Out of Control (2008)	Ten (2012)

Singles from Out of Control
- 1. "The Promise" Released: 15 October 2008; 2. "The Loving Kind" Released: 12 January 2009; 3. "Untouchable" Released: 27 April 2009

Alternative cover
- Special edition

Out of Control is the fifth studio album by English-Irish girl group Girls Aloud, released on 31 October 2008 in Ireland and on 3 November 2008 in the UK by Fascination Records. As with their previous albums, the album was primarily crafted by Brian Higgins and the Xenomania production team. Musically, the album builds on the group's established sound while moving towards a more polished and mainstream pop direction. Girls Aloud took a more active role in shaping the album's creative direction, incorporating prominent 1960s influences alongside 1980s-inspired electropop.

The album received generally positive reviews, with critics praising its inventive, catchy and emotionally resonant production, although some felt it was less innovative than the group's earlier work. Commercially, it was a major success, becoming Girls Aloud's first studio album to reach number one on the UK Albums Chart and also topping the Scottish Albums Charts, while reaching number seven in Ireland. It went on to become the group's highest-selling studio album, with UK sales exceeding 800,000 copies, and was certified 2× Platinum in both the United Kingdom and Ireland.

Out of Control produced three singles, beginning with "The Promise", which became Girls Aloud's fourth UK number-one single and won Song of the Year at the 2009 Brit Awards. Follow-up "The Loving Kind" became the group's 20th consecutive top-ten single, while "Untouchable" marked their first single to miss the UK top ten. To promote the album, Girls Aloud embarked on the Out of Control Tour from April to June 2009, before announcing a year-long hiatus to pursue solo projects, with plans to reunite for a new studio album in 2010; however, the planned album never materialised.

== Background ==
In November 2007, Girls Aloud released their fourth studio album, Tangled Up. The album peaked at number four on the UK Albums Chart and was certified Platinum by the British Phonographic Industry (BPI), with sales exceeding 500,000 copies. It produced three singles with "Sexy! No No No..." reaching number five on the UK Singles Chart, "Call the Shots" peaking in the top three, and "Can't Speak French" extending the group's run of consecutive top-ten singles. The release of "Can't Speak French" coincided with their second television series, The Passions of Girls Aloud, which followed the members as they pursued various interests outside the group. In 2008, Girls Aloud received their second Brit Award nomination for Best British Group and embarked on the Tangled Up Tour, comprising 34 dates across the United Kingdom. During this period, the group also contributed two songs to the soundtrack of the 2007 film St Trinian's, in which they made a cameo appearance as the school's band.

The group's fifth studio album was announced in May 2008, while Girls Aloud were still undertaking the Tangled Up Tour. Recording took place during the summer of 2008 at Xenomania's studios in Kent, with the group continuing their established collaboration with producer Brian Higgins and the Xenomania production team. The group's vocals were largely recorded individually during the sessions, which Sarah Harding described as more relaxed than those for previous albums. In contrast to their previous releases, Girls Aloud's increasingly mainstream profile had a greater influence on the album's direction, with Higgins and the Xenomania team favouring more immediate and accessible pop material over the unconventional and experimental approach of earlier songs such as "Biology" or "The Show." Girls Aloud received songwriting credits on four tracks from the album, including "Love Is the Key", "Miss You Bow Wow", "Revolution in the Head" and "Live in the Country." The album's title, Out of Control, originated from a remark made by the group's record label, which reportedly described the members as "out of control" and said that they could not be told what to do. The phrase also appears as a lyric in "We Wanna Party." An alternative title, Girls Aloud: Revolution, was reportedly considered after the song "Revolution in the Head", although it was ultimately not used. The album artwork for Out of Control, which was photographed by Ian Bartlett, was revealed on Girls Aloud's official website on 16 October 2008.

== Music ==
=== Style and lyrics ===
Kimberley Walsh has said that the album is "a lot older sounding, which wasn't intentional, it was just kind of how it went." The girl group were very involved in the album's direction. "The '60s thing is quite prominent," Walsh told the BBC. "But it's out of the ordinary. Not really what you'd expect." Nicola Roberts said that the album also features a lot of 1980s-inspired electropop. Sarah Harding said that Girls Aloud "wanted to stay upbeat but try something a bit different and advanced. I don't think anything we've ever done has ever sounded the same. But we have that same vibe whatever we do because of our vocals." Nadine Coyle said the "aim from the beginning was to come up with songs that didn't sound like anything else out there." Walsh continued, "We want to impress the fans with what we do, so we've tried to up our game with this album and step outside the comfort zone." Harding noted that the group sought to retain their characteristic upbeat sound while experimenting with more advanced and unconventional musical ideas. The resulting material was intended to represent a progression from their previous work while maintaining the distinct vocal identity that had become characteristic of Girls Aloud. Harding also emphasised the group's desire to produce songs that sounded distinct from other contemporary pop releases.

=== Songs ===
The album's lead single, "The Promise", is a 1960s Spector-influenced number. Despite the popularity of 1960's pastiches, it was said that Girls Aloud's "go-for-broke, very modern re-imagining of Spector's wall of sound proves to be more authentic and entertaining than most other recent attempts". "The Loving Kind" is a collaboration with Pet Shop Boys. Neil Tennant said that they co-wrote the song while working with Xenomania, and described it as "beautiful but still dancey". Popjustice said that "the lyrics have the sadness and melancholy of a massive proper ballad but the production drags the song straight to the dancefloor and lends it an undeniable sense of optimism." The song has been compared to 2007's "Call the Shots", and has been referred to as both "a letdown sequel" and "the best thing they've ever done." "Rolling Back the Rivers in Time", which originally had a working title of "50s Sweetheart", was compared to Burt Bacharach. It features guitar from Johnny Marr, formerly of the Smiths, who also plays harmonica on "Love Is the Key".

"Love Is the Key", according to Digital Spy, "begins with the strains of a cathedral choir before lurching into a 1960s-style pop strut". It ends with "a bluesey harmonica solo in the outro." "Turn to Stone" was called an "icy electro banger", compared to "Róisín Murphy's moody kid sisters being remixed by 808 State". "Untouchable" is a six and a half-minute song that was called "fast, electronic and fantastic" with an immense build-up to the chorus. The song was said to recall New Order and "fuses blissful Balearic guitar lines with a pulsating techno throb". The song was later remixed and shortened for the single release. Track seven, "Fix Me Up", was compared to "the theme tune to a comedy sex film from 1975. In a good way." It contains a sample of Reuben Bell's "Superjock", written by Bell, Jerry Strickland, and Wardell Quezergue. "Love is Pain" was described by Popjustice as "an early-90s electronic sort of affair."

"Miss You Bow Wow", it was stated, "could well be the most exhilarating song of the year, being almost ridiculously danceable, having a gloriously soaring chorus and some surreal lyrics". "Revolution in the Head", a reggae-influenced song, features pseudo-rapping from Nadine Coyle. "Live in the Country" is a drum and bass track and "basically the sequel to 'Swinging London Town'" (from Girls Aloud's 2005 album Chemistry). It was described as a "drum and bass anti-anarchy anthem". The album's bonus track, "We Wanna Party", is a cover of a Lene Nystrøm track. Nystrøm previously co-wrote Girls Aloud's "No Good Advice" and "You Freak Me Out", and also has her own version of "Here We Go". Girls Aloud originally recorded the song for What Will the Neighbours Say?, but it was decided it did not fit.

== Release ==
Out of Control was initially announced to be released on 10 November 2008, but the release date was moved forward a week to 3 November. The Irish release date came the Friday before on 31 October 2008. In addition to the album, an extra limited edition live album was released. Entitled Girls A Live, the bonus disc was available to purchase only from Woolworths. It features a number of live performances from Girls Aloud's tours. Additionally, a double-disc collector's edition of the album was released 8 December. The box set comes in a DVD-sized case and contains a bonus disc containing unreleased demos and interviews, as well as a 24-page booklet containing photos and lyrics to all of the songs.

=== Singles ===
- The album's first single, "The Promise", was released as the album's lead single on 15 October 2008. The song is notable for its 1960s influence, with "production that tips its cap towards vintage Spector." The music video took place at a 1950s-and-1960s-inspired drive-in movie theatre, where a retro-styled Girls Aloud watched themselves channel The Supremes on screen. "The Promise" became Girls Aloud's fourth No. 1 upon release. It also earned the group their first ever win at the BRIT Award for Best British Single in 2009.
- "The Loving Kind" was released as the album's second single on 12 January 2009. The music video, directed by Trudy Bellinger, was premiered on 3 December 2008. In the run-up to the single's release, commentators began to speculate that the song could possibly become the first single by the group to miss the top ten. However, "The Loving Kind" peaked at No. 10 on the UK singles chart, becoming Girls Aloud's 20th consecutive top ten single.
- "Untouchable" was released on 27 April 2009, as the third and final single taken from Out of Control. "Untouchable" peaked at No. 11 on the UK singles chart becoming Girls Aloud's first and only single not to reach the top 10.

== Critical reception ==
Professional ratings
Aggregate scores
Source	Rating
Metacritic	63/100
Review scores
Source	Rating
AllMusic	3.5/5 stars
Digital Spy	4/5 stars
The Guardian	3/5 stars
The Independent	2/5 stars
musicOMH	4/5 stars
NME	8/10
The Observer	3/5 stars
Slant Magazine	4/5 stars
The Times	4/5 stars

Out of Control received positive reviews from music critics. Aggregating website Metacritic reports a normalised rating of 63% based on nine critic reviews, indicating "a generally favorable" reception. It was described as "their most melancholy album to date". The Times wrote that Girls Aloud "show no sign of flagging in their quest to push the boundaries of the pop song" and noticed that they "continue to be as inventive as ever." BBC Music described Out of Control as "a shimmering album of heartbreaking electro pop" and exclaimed that it is "pop music at its finest." Digital Spy found it "smart, adventurous, emotionally resonant and often very, very catchy" and called it "an absolute delight" and Girls Aloud's "fourth terrific album in a row". MusicOMH noticed that it is "chock-full of those trademark, otherworldy electro-synth songs" and concluded by calling it "yet another excellent album from a group who may have risen from a lot of people's 'guilty pleasure' to becoming full-on national treasures". Slant Magazine hailed it as "one of the best pop albums of 2008" and said that Girls Aloud "are in a position where they can let the music do all the talking for them". NME praised the songs "Love Is The Key", "Rolling Back the Rivers in Time" and "Untouchable" and stated that although it is "not their best" effort, it is "more consistent than any British indie album released this year".

Yahoo Music said that it "barely steers too far from their recipe for success", but more or less praised the album, awarding it seven out of ten. The Observer gave it three out of five stars, but felt that Girls Aloud raised the bar so spectacularly that this album "suggests that Xenomania's once-bottomless well of great ideas is running dry". The Guardian stated that "despite ear-catching touches [...], nothing hits the spot like the Phil Spector-like single The Promise". The Independent described Girls Aloud's output as "the musical equivalent of the lingering aftertaste of synthetic sweeteners", calling the album "meekly conformist pop." The album appeared on Critic's Choice lists by Billboard contributors Keith Caulfield, Hazel Davis, and Mikael Wood. In 2008, the album came top in Popjustice's Readers Poll 2008, beating Britney Spears' Circus. The lead single, "The Promise", came fourth, behind Spears' "Womanizer", which they later covered on their Out of Control Tour, MGMT's "Kids" and Sam Sparro's "Black and Gold". "The Promise" also won Best Number One Single and the group won Best Pop Act of 2008.

== Commercial performance ==
Out of Control debuted in the Irish Albums Chart at No. 7, the highest debut of the week and their second highest charting in Ireland. It debuted in the UK Albums Chart at No. 1. This is their first studio album to achieve the coveted No. 1 position. The album Girls A Live also entered the UK Albums Chart at No. 29. Out of Control spent five weeks in the UK top five overall, and three additional weeks in the top ten. In the top ten albums chart of 2008, Out of Control came eighth, selling nearly 600,000 copies within just two months. On 4 January 2009, The Sound of Girls Aloud: The Greatest Hits re-entered the charts at No. 6 while Out of Control was No. 10, thus giving Girls Aloud two top ten albums at the same time. By August 2009, Out of Control had sold over 800,000 copies.

== Track listing ==
All tracks were produced by Brian Higgins and Xenomania. Credits adapted from the liner notes of Out of Control.

Standard edition
No.	Title	Writer(s)	Length
1.	"The Promise"	Miranda Cooper; Brian Higgins; Jason Resch; Kieran Jones; Carla Marie Williams	4:03
2.	"The Loving Kind"	Cooper; Higgins; Tim Powell; Neil Tennant; Chris Lowe	3:54
3.	"Rolling Back the Rivers in Time"	Cooper; Higgins; Williams; Powell	4:29
4.	"Love Is the Key"	Girls Aloud; Cooper; Higgins; Powell	4:17
5.	"Turn to Stone"	Cooper; Higgins; Powell; Matt Gray; Stuart McIennan; Sacha Collisson	4:25
6.	"Untouchable"	Cooper; Higgins; Powell; Gray	6:43
7.	"Fix Me Up"	Cooper; Higgins; Resch; Jones; Williams; Powell	4:26
8.	"Love Is Pain"	Cooper; Higgins; Williams	3:32
9.	"Miss You Bow Wow"	Girls Aloud; Cooper; Higgins; Powell; Lisa Cowling; Owen Parker; Toby Scott; Myra Boyle	4:11
10.	"Revolution in the Head"	Girls Aloud; Cooper; Higgins; Williams; Powell; Parker	4:31
11.	"Live in the Country"	Girls Aloud; Cooper; Higgins; Powell; Gray; Niara Scarlett	4:15

United Kingdom and special edition bonus track
No.	Title	Writer(s)	Length
12.	"We Wanna Party"	Cooper; Higgins; Cowling; Nick Coler; Powell; Lene Nystrøm	3:54
Total length:			53:09

Special edition bonus disc
No.	Title	Length
1.	"Out of Control: Making the Album" (commentary)	29:13

Girls A Live
No.	Title	Writer(s)	Length
1.	"Something Kinda Ooooh" (live at the Local, Birmingham, 2007)	Cooper; Higgins; Powell; Coler; Jody Lei; Giselle Sommerville	3:42
2.	"Waiting" (live at Wembley, Chemistry Tour 2006)	Cooper; Higgins; Tim "Rolf" Larcombe; Cowling; Shawn Lee; Paul Woods; Lars Fox	4:27
3.	"Call the Shots" (live at the O2, Tangled Up Tour 2008)	Cooper; Higgins; Powell; Sommerville; Cowling	4:03
4.	"Deadlines and Diets" (live at the Hammersmith Apollo, What Will the Neighbours Say...? Tour 2005)	Cooper; Higgins; Gray	4:42
5.	"Close to Love" (live at the O2, Tangled Up Tour 2008)	Cooper; Higgins; Powell; Coler; Lei; Cowling	4:16
6.	"Love Machine" (live at the Local, Birmingham, 2007)	Cooper; Higgins; Powell; Coler; Cowling; Boyle; Lee	3:36
7.	"Biology" (live at Wembley, Chemistry Tour 2006)	Cooper; Higgins; Cowling; Powell; Sommerville	4:24
8.	"Graffiti My Soul" (live at the Hammersmith Apollo, What Will the Neighbours Say...? Tour 2005)	Cooper; Higgins; Cowling; Powell; Peplab	5:05

== Personnel ==
- Joe Auckland – strings, woodwind
- Dick Beetham – mastering
- Nick Coler – guitar, keyboards, programming
- Miranda Cooper – keyboards, programming
- Brian Higgins – producer
- Tim Powell – keyboards, programming
- Toby Scott – keyboards, programming, engineer
- Sacha Collisson – keyboards, programming
- Adrian Smith – strings, woodwind
- Jeremy Wheatley – mixing
- Neil Tennant – keyboards and backing vocals on "The Loving Kind"
- Chris Lowe – keyboards on "The Loving Kind"
- Johnny Marr – guitar on "Rolling Back The Rivers in Time", harmonica on "Love Is The Key"

== Charts ==
=== Weekly charts ===
Weekly chart performance for Out of Control
Chart (2008)	Peak position
Irish Albums (IRMA)	7
Scottish Albums (Official Charts)	1
UK Albums (Official Charts)	1

=== Year-end charts ===
Year-end chart performance for Out of Control
Chart (2008)	Position
UK Albums (OCC)	8
Chart (2009)	Position
UK Albums (OCC)	78

== Certifications ==
Certifications for Out of Control
Region	Certification	Certified units/sales
Ireland (IRMA)	2× Platinum	30,000^{^}
United Kingdom (BPI)	2× Platinum	800,000
^{^} Shipments figures based on certification alone.

== Release history ==
Out of Control release history
Region	Date	Label	Format(s)	Ref.
Ireland	31 October 2008	Polydor Records	CD; digital download	
United Kingdom	3 November 2008	Fascination Records	CD; digital download	
United States	11 November 2008	Polydor Records	CD	
Germany	10 April 2009	Polydor Records	CD; digital download	

== See also ==
- List of 2008 albums
- List of UK Albums Chart number ones of the 2000s
