= Out of Control: Live from the O2 2009 =

Out of Control: Live from the O_{2}

Live album by Girls Aloud
- Released: 5 October 2009
- Recorded: 24 May 2009, The O_{2} Arena, London, England
- Genre: Pop
- Length: 82:40
- Labels: Fascination; Polydor

Out of Control: Live from the O_{2} 2009 is a live album and DVD by British pop group Girls Aloud. The CD is part of the Out Of Control Live from The O_{2} 2009 DVD limited fan edition set, only available on Girls Aloud's official website. The CD was recorded on 24 May 2009 at The O_{2} Arena in London while the group was on their Out of Control Tour. The album contains all the songs from the tour, with the exception of the Megamix that ends the show.

== Track list ==
=== DVD ===
1. "The Promise"
2. "No Good Advice"
3. "Love Is The Key"
4. "Life Got Cold"
5. "Love Bomb"
6. "Biology"
7. "Miss You Bow Wow"
8. "The Loving Kind"
9. "Waiting"
10. "Jump"
11. "Love Machine"
12. "Rolling Back The Rivers In Time"
13. "Untouchable"
14. "Sexy! No No No..."
15. "Broken Strings"
16. "Love Is Pain"
17. "Wild Horses"
18. "Call The Shots"
19. "Revolution In The Head"
20. "Sound Of The Underground"
21. "Fix Me Up"
22. "Womanizer"
23. "Something Kinda Ooooh"
24. Hits Medley: "The Show"/"Wake Me Up"/"Jump"/"No Good Advice"/"Can't Speak French"
25. "The Promise" (reprise)

== Bonus Features ==
=== Videos ===
1. The Promise (Video)
2. The Loving Kind
3. Untouchable (New Ending)
4. Revolution In The Head Cheryl Girl Cam - Stereo
5. Love Machine Nicola Girl Cam - Stereo
6. Miss You Bow Wow Sarah Girl Cam - Stereo
7. Sound Of The Underground Nadine Girl Cam - Stereo
8. Love Is The Key Kimberley Girl Cam - Stereo
9. Womanizer (Visuals)
10. Love Machine (Visuals)
11. Love Is The Key (Visuals)
12. Revolution In The Head (Visuals)
13. Biology (Visuals)
14. Out Of Control (Tour Interview)

Live audio track list

1. The Promise
2. Love Is The Key
3. Biology
4. Miss You Bow Wow
5. The Loving Kind
6. Waiting
7. Love Machine
8. Rolling Back The Rivers In Time
9. Untouchable
10. Sexy! No No No...
11. Broken Strings
12. Love Is Pain
13. Call The Shots
14. Revolution In The Head
15. Sound Of The Underground
16. Fix Me Up
17. Womanizer
18. Something Kinda Ooooh

=== CD track listing ===
Standard edition
No.	Title	Writer(s)	Length
1.	"The Promise"	Miranda Cooper; Brian Higgins; Jason Resch; Kieran Jones; Carla Marie Williams	5:17
2.	"Love Is the Key"	Girls Aloud; Cooper; Higgins; Jason Tim Powell	4:17
3.	"Biology"	Cooper; Higgins; Powell; Lisa Cowling; Giselle Sommerville	3:24
4.	"Miss You Bow Wow"	Girls Aloud; Cooper; Higgins; Powell; Cowling; Owen Parker; Toby Scott; Myra Boyle	4:07
5.	"The Loving Kind"	Cooper; Higgins; Powell; Neil Tennant; Chris Lowe	3:59
6.	"Waiting"	Cooper; Higgins; Cowling; Lee; Paul Woods; Tim "Rolf" Larcombe	4:14
7.	"Love Machine"	Cooper; Higgins; Powell; Cowling; Nick Coler; Boyle; Shawn Lee	4:09
8.	"Rolling Back the Rivers in Time"	Cooper; Higgins; Williams; Powell	4:29
9.	"Untouchable"	Cooper; Higgins; Powell; Matt Gray	6:57
10.	"Sexy! No No No..."	Girls Aloud; Xenomania; Nazareth	3:48
11.	"Broken Strings"	James Morrison; Fraser T Smith; Nina Woodford	4:19
12.	"Love Is Pain"	Cooper; Higgins; Williams	3:27
13.	"Call the Shots"	Cooper; Higgins; Powell; Sommerville; Cowling	4:38
14.	"Revolution in the Head"	Girls Aloud; Cooper; Higgins; Williams; Powell; Parker	4:52
15.	"Sound of the Underground"	Cooper; Higgins; Niara Scarlett; Xenomania	4:03
16.	"Fix Me Up"	Cooper; Higgins; Resch; Jones; Williams; Powell	2:38
17.	"Womanizer"	Nikesha Briscoe; Rafael Akinyemi	3:51
18.	"Something Kinda Ooooh"	Cooper; Higgins; Powell; Coler; Sommerville; Jody Lei	5:52
