= Billiam =

British boy band

- Origin: Birmingham, Leeds, Preston, Newcastle upon Tyne, England
- Genres: Pop
- Years active: 2007–2008
- Labels: Nightingale
- Members: Jordan, Zen, Jazz, George.
- Website: www.billiamuk.com (now offline)

Billiam were a four-piece British boy band. They supported Westlife in 2007 and Girls Aloud on their Tangled Up Tour in 2008. Their debut single, "Beautiful Ones", reached number 32 in September 2007 and "My Generation" entered the UK charts on 22 June 2008 at number 23. In November 2008 Billiam announced their split.

== Discography ==
=== Singles ===
- 2007 – "Beautiful Ones" No. 32 UK Singles Chart
- 2008 – "My Generation" No. 23 UK Singles Chart
