= The Loving Kind =

2009 single by Girls Aloud

Single by Girls Aloud

from the album Out of Control
- B-side: "Memory of You"; "Girls on 45 Megamix"
- Released: 12 January 2009
- Recorded: 2008
- Genre: Synth-pop
- Length: 3:53 (album version); 3:59 (radio mix)
- Label: Fascination
- Songwriters: Miranda Cooper; Brian Higgins; Tim Powell; Neil Tennant; Chris Lowe
- Producers: Brian Higgins; Xenomania

Girls Aloud singles chronology
"The Promise" (2008)	"The Loving Kind" (2009)	"Untouchable" (2009)

Music video
- "The Loving Kind" on YouTube

"The Loving Kind" is a song by British-Irish girl group Girls Aloud, taken from their fifth studio album Out of Control (2008). The song was written by Pet Shop Boys, Miranda Cooper, Brian Higgins and his production team Xenomania, and produced by Higgins and Xenomania. Described as a "synth-pop ballad", "The Loving Kind" was originally written for inclusion on Pet Shop Boys' Yes (2009) before being given to Girls Aloud. Upon its release in January 2009, "The Loving Kind" peaked at number ten on the UK Singles Chart, thereby continuing their six-year streak of top-ten hits.

In the music video, the group portrays the "good" and "bad" Girls Aloud as they perform in mirrored boxes. "The Loving Kind" was promoted through numerous live appearances and was performed on 2009's Out of Control Tour. The song was largely praised by most contemporary music critics, although maligned by others for its similarities with "Call the Shots".

== Background and composition ==
Xenomania and Pet Shop Boys wrote the song in sessions for the latter's album Yes. Both parties had previously agreed there would be just three co-written songs on the album, and having noticed Chris Lowe's "slight reticence" towards the song, Higgins suggested that Girls Aloud record "The Loving Kind". Pet Shop Boys member Neil Tennant said that they co-wrote the song while working with Xenomania, and described it as "beautiful but still dancey". It was the second song Girls Aloud recorded for Out of Control. PopJustice wrote that "the lyrics have the sadness and melancholy of a massive proper ballad but the production drags the song straight to the dancefloor and lends it an undeniable sense of optimism." Lowe said he was "absolutely over the moon" with the result.

"The Loving Kind"
The song's lyrics are wistful and melancholy.

"The Loving Kind" is in the same vein as much of the Pet Shop Boys' output. The Observer described it as an "elegantly sad account of a waning relationship." The song is written in D♭ major with a time signature in common time and a tempo of 128 beats per minute. The basic chord progression of the song is G♭, D♭, B♭m, Fm, and A♭. The song begins instantly with a synthesised introduction, followed by the first verse and refrain. There is an emotive bridge and a middle 8. The verse repeats, followed by the chorus, an instrumental section, and the chorus again. The radio mix differs slightly; the introduction is less abrupt and the song lasts six seconds longer.

== Release ==
The single was confirmed on 21 November 2008 via Girls Aloud's official website. The CD single includes a Girls Aloud megamix, released to celebrate Girls Aloud's twentieth single release. The megamix was created by Jewels & Stone, and features the intro and outro from the famous Stars on 45 medleys. There was also 7" picture disc made available, which included a previously unreleased B-side entitled "Memory of You", originally called "Japan". Remixes by Wideboys and Utah Saints were also commissioned.

=== B-side ===
There was a mild controversy surrounding the fact that the single's B-side "Memory of You" was only available on the vinyl format and not in CD or digital quality. The song was originally called "Japan". Popjustice featured a 30-second clip of "Memory of You" as their Song of the Day prior to release. It was later included in high quality on the official Girls Aloud singles box set later in 2009 and went on to be included on the deluxe edition of their second greatest hits compilation Ten. Roberts recorded a solo version of the song and made it available via pre-order only with her third single, "Yo-Yo", from her debut album.

== Critical reception ==
The song received mostly positive reviews from contemporary music critics. Digital Spy gave the song five stars, saying it "weds hauntingly melancholy vocals [...] to a sense of dancefloor euphoria totally at odds with the teary-eyed lyrics" and was "nothing short of dazzling, meaning 'The Loving Kind' deserves a place [...] on the list of Girls Aloud's finest ever singles." They called it "the standout track" from Out of Control and "one of the most emotionally resonant songs of the group's career." Dorian Lynskey of The Observer agreed, calling it "best of all [...] It's bracing to hear Girls Aloud traffic in grown-up emotions". "The Loving Kind" has also been called "the best thing they've ever done." Nicola Roberts was praised for her vocals, which Slant Magazine felt "provide some of the album's most affecting moments."

However, "The Loving Kind" was criticised due to its similarities with 2007's "Call the Shots", with NME even calling the song as "a letdown sequel". BBC Music felt the song was "hugely disappointing." Popjustice said that although it isn't "amazing by Girls Aloud PLUS Xenomania PLUS Pet Shop Boys standards", it was still "really properly amazing." In a blog for BBC, Fraser McAlpine agreed that "it's easy to get caught up on the idea of this being some immense pop event," but it was still an "extremely well done piece of heartbroken pop."

At the 2009 Popjustice £20 Music Prize, Nicola Roberts expressed dislike for the song and even nominated it for the Twenty Quid Invoice Prize, presented to what judges deem to be the worst single of any given year.

== Chart performance ==
On 14 December 2008, "The Loving Kind" entered the UK Singles Chart at number 87 on downloads alone. The following week, it entered the top forty at number 38. In the run-up to the single's release, chart commentators began to speculate that the song could possibly become the first single by the group to miss the top 10. James Masterton wrote on his Yahoo! chart blog, "Their problem is the continuing chart performance of former number 1 hit 'The Promise'. [...] Good reviews do not chart placings make and "this song is too good to be a flop" is as much a myth as "team X are far too good to get relegated"." After its physical release, "The Loving Kind" still managed to peak at number ten, becoming Girls Aloud's twentieth consecutive top ten single. It fell to number 14 the following week, but spent eighteen weeks in the top 100. "The Loving Kind" was highly successful in the Scottish Singles Chart, outpeaking "The Promise" by entering at number two and remaining in the top 10 for 4 weeks. The song entered the Irish Singles Chart at number 49, rising to number 24 the following week and eventually peaking at number sixteen.

== Music video ==
Girls Aloud in the music video for "The Loving Kind" (2008).

The music video, directed by Trudy Bellinger, was premièred on 4Music at 7pm and was shown on Channel 4 at 11:05pm on 3 December 2008. The making of the video was aired on MTV Hits on 13 December 2008, with reruns on both MTV Hits and TMF.

In the video, the girls portray the "good" Girls Aloud, who are the lovable kind, and their "bad" alter egos, who are not. The bad Girls Aloud throw wine and smash the glass that covers their boxes. Cheryl Cole cut herself when she smashed her hand through the glass and similarly Nadine Coyle injured herself when she kicked her foot through the glass; causing her shoe to fall off. Pop music blog PopJustice noted that "twenty singles in, Girls Aloud have made their best video yet."

== Live performances ==
Girls Aloud's first performance of the song occurred on their ITV1 variety show The Girls Aloud Party. The group performed in matching black tutus, described by MarieClaire as "mini prom dresses." They perform with slow, ballet-like motions and make their way to a catwalk. As Sarah Harding adlibs into the final chorus, pyrotechnics explode on both sides of the stage. On The Paul O'Grady Show, they performed in pink and purple dresses. On GMTV, they performed in the outfits from the music video. The performance received attention for Harding's "bum note".

On the group's 2009 Out of Control Tour, each girl is positioned in front of boxes with flashing lightbulbs, similar to those in the music video. Neon designs and scenes from the music video appear on the screens above the boxes. The ramps in front of them, used throughout the tour, also flash with neon lights. As the performance comes to a close, the lights all turn off.

== Formats and track listings ==
These are the formats and track listings of major single releases of "The Loving Kind".

UK CD (Fascination / 1794885)

1. "The Loving Kind" (Radio Mix) – 3:59
2. "Girls on 45, Volume 2" – 7:25

UK 7" picture disc (Fascination / 1794887)

1. "The Loving Kind" (Radio Mix) – 3:59
2. "Memory of You" (Girls Aloud, Cooper, Higgins, Powell, Giselle Sommerville) – 3:48

iTunes exclusive digital download

1. "The Loving Kind" (Utah Saints Club Mix) – 6:14

Digital download

1. "The Loving Kind" (Wideboys Club Mix) – 6:37

Mobile download

1. "The Loving Kind" (Wideboys Radio Edit) – 2:49

The Singles Boxset (CD20) / Digital EP

1. "The Loving Kind" (Radio Mix) – 3:59
2. "Girls on 45, Volume 2" – 7:25
3. "Memory of You" – 3:48
4. "The Loving Kind" (Utah Saints Club Mix) – 6:14
5. "The Loving Kind" (Wideboys Club Mix) – 6:37
6. "The Loving Kind" (Wideboys Radio Edit) – 2:49
7. "The Loving Kind" (Wideboys Dub) – 6:38
8. "The Loving Kind" (Utah Saints Radio Mix) – 3:15
9. "The Loving Kind" (Utah Saints Dub) – 5:57

== Credits and personnel ==
- Engineering: Toby Scott, Dan Aslet
- Guitars: Nick Coler, Jason Resch, Owen Parker
- Keyboards and programming: Brian Higgins, Tim Powell, Neil Tennant, Chris Lowe, Matt Gray, Miranda Cooper, Sacha Collisson
- Mixing: Jeremy Wheatley, Tim Powell, Yoad Nevo
- Songwriting: Miranda Cooper, Brian Higgins, Tim Powell, Neil Tennant, Chris Lowe

== Charts ==
=== Weekly charts ===
Weekly chart performance for "The Loving Kind"
Chart (2009)	Peak position
El Salvador (EFE)	8
European Hot 100 Singles (Billboard)	37
Ireland (IRMA)	16
Scottish Singles Sales (Official Charts)	2
UK Singles (Official Charts)	10
UK Airplay (Music Week)	1

=== Year-end charts ===
2009 year-end chart performance for "The Loving Kind"
Chart (2009)	Position
UK Singles (OCC)	149

== Certifications ==
Certifications for "The Loving Kind"
Region	Certification	Certified units/sales
United Kingdom (BPI)	Silver	200,000^{‡}
^{‡} Sales+streaming figures based on certification alone.

== Pet Shop Boys version ==
A version of the song by the Pet Shop Boys (named "monitor mix") was released on the reissue of the group's album Yes/Further Listening 2008-2010 in 2017.
