= Out of Control Tour =

2009 concert tour by Girls Aloud

- Tour by Girls Aloud
- Associated album: Out of Control
- Start date: 24 April 2009
- End date: 6 June 2009
- Legs: 1
- No. of shows: 32 in Europe

Girls Aloud concert chronology
- Tangled Up Tour (2008); Out of Control Tour (2009); Ten: The Hits Tour (2013)

The Out of Control Tour was the fifth concert tour by British-Irish girl group Girls Aloud. It supported their fifth studio album Out of Control. Initially, just ten dates in bigger arenas were announced in November 2008. Due to demand, more dates were added. Girls Aloud performed thirty-two dates across the United Kingdom and Ireland. The tour commenced on 24 April 2009 at the Manchester Evening News Arena, with the final show on 6 June 2009 in Newcastle's Metro Radio Arena.

The show was divided into five unique sections with distinct costumes, including the encore. Each member of the group had their own respective platform. During the show, Girls Aloud used pole dancing techniques and themes of BDSM. Most of the songs performed come from Out of Control, but earlier singles and cover versions were also performed. Like 2008's Tangled Up Tour, there is a smaller stage in the centre of the arena that Girls Aloud perform on during the show.

== Background and development ==
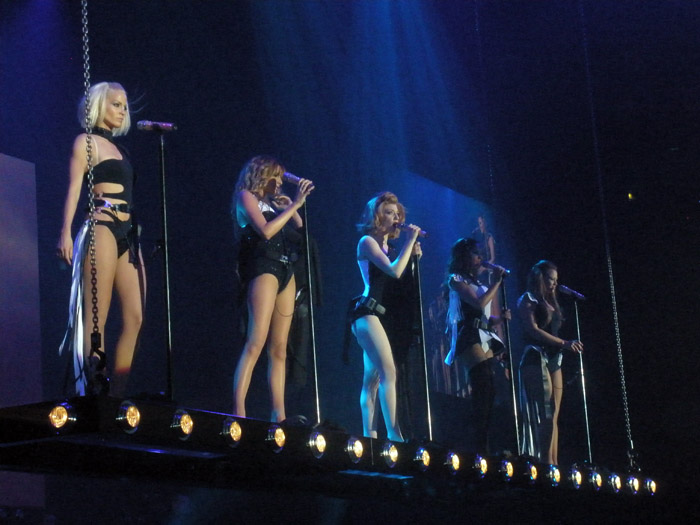
Girls Aloud performing at the Manchester Evening News Arena on 24 April 2009

Girls Aloud announced their plans to tour in support of Out of Control in mid-November 2008. Initially, just ten tour dates in bigger arenas across the United Kingdom and Ireland were announced, with tickets going on sale on 14 November. Due to arenas selling out, Girls Aloud added a number of live shows to the tour. Cheryl Cole's hometown of Newcastle sold particularly well, with the group scheduled to play a record-breaking four nights. Girls Aloud were also scheduled to play three dates in Belfast, Birmingham, Glasgow, Liverpool, and four dates in London and Manchester. The group performed three nights in O_{2} Arena and two at Wembley Arena.

The group began rehearsals "straight after Christmas". They took pole dancing lessons to prepare for a routine. Cheryl Cole and Kimberley Walsh missed some tour rehearsals, citing exhaustion following their charity climb of Mount Kilimanjaro for Comic Relief.

Girls Aloud's rider includes treadmills, various exercise machines, and scented candles, as well as a physical therapist and masseuse. Each individual member has her own respective hairdresser and make-up artist.

Emma Deigman was confirmed as the supporting act during the tour. Other support acts included Julian Perretta, Girls Can't Catch and Absent Elk. In addition to their own dates, Girls Aloud and American rapper Jay Z were support acts for Coldplay's Viva la Vida Tour at Wembley Stadium on 18 September 2009.

== Concert synopsis ==
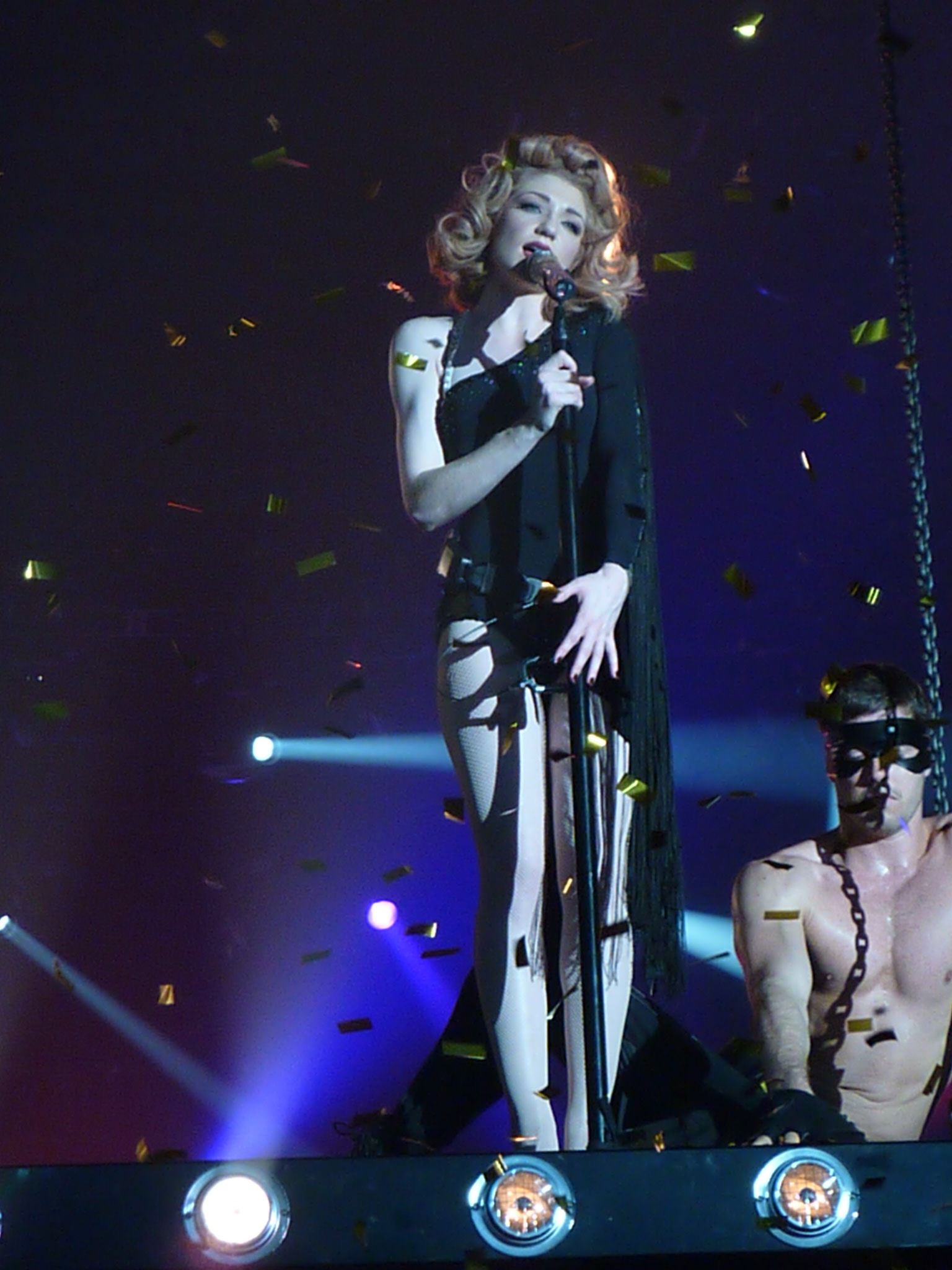
Nicola Roberts performing at the Metro Radio Arena in Newcastle during the final date of the tour

Girls Aloud start the show with their number one Brit Award-winning single "The Promise", "burst[ing] up out of the floor wearing long, spangly dresses which they whipped off to reveal short mini skirts." They rise above the stage on individual hydraulic podiums. Girls Aloud then perform Out of Control album track "Love Is the Key", followed by "Biology" and another album track entitled "Miss You Bow Wow." The dancers perform to an extended instrumental of "Miss You Bow Wow" while Girls Aloud change.

During the show's second section, Girls Aloud wear black-and-white kimono-inspired playsuits. They perform "The Loving Kind", followed by a revival of "Waiting", an album track from 2005's Chemistry. They then sing hit single "Love Machine" and "Rolling Back the Rivers in Time." During a performance of "Untouchable", Girls Aloud "fly" on a platform to a smaller, specially constructed stage in the centre of the arena. They perform "Sexy! No No No..." with a dance break containing interpolations of Rihanna's "Disturbia". They perform a cover of James Morrison's "Broken Strings". The album track "Love Is Pain" is performed, followed by "Call the Shots", as Girls Aloud return to the main stage.

Following a video sequence, "Revolution in the Head" is performed. Girls Aloud then perform debut single "Sound of the Underground". Girls Aloud pole dance for a performance of the album track "Fix Me Up" in "skintight dominatrix gear." A cover of Britney Spears' "Womanizer" features BDSM themes in its performance. The girls wear "tiny PVC outfits" and use whips on their dancers. This section ends with "Something Kinda Ooooh". Girls Aloud return in butterfly sequined corsets for their final number. The encore of the show is a megamix of Girls Aloud's other hits, consisting of: "The Show", "Wake Me Up", "Jump", "No Good Advice", "Can't Speak French", and a reprise of "The Promise."

== Opening acts ==
- Absent Elk (select dates)
- Emma Deigman (select dates)
- Will & The People (select dates)
- Girls Can't Catch (select dates)
- Julian Perretta (select dates)

== Setlist ==
The following setlist is obtained from the concert held on 26 April 2009, at The O_{2} Arena in London, England. It does not represent all concerts for the duration of the tour.

Section 1

1. "The Promise"
2. "Love is the Key"
3. "Biology"
4. "Miss You Bow Wow"

Section 2

5. "The Loving Kind"
6. "Waiting"
7. "Love Machine"
8. "Rolling Back the Rivers in Time"

Section 3

9. "Untouchable"
10. "Sexy! No No No..." (contains elements of "Disturbia")
11. "Broken Strings" (James Morrison cover)
12. "Love is Pain"
13. "Call the Shots"

Section 4

14. "Revolution in the Head"
15. "Sound of the Underground"
16. "Fix Me Up"
17. "Womanizer" (Britney Spears cover)
18. "Something Kinda Ooooh"

Encore

19. Hits Medley: "The Show"/"Wake Me Up"/"Jump"/"No Good Advice"/"Can't Speak French"
20. "The Promise" (reprise)

== Tour dates ==
Date	City	Country	Venue
24 April 2009	Manchester	England	Manchester Evening News Arena
25 April 2009	Sheffield	England	Sheffield Arena
26 April 2009	London	England	The O_{2} Arena
28 April 2009	Belfast	Northern Ireland	Odyssey Arena
29 April 2009	Belfast	Northern Ireland	Odyssey Arena
30 April 2009	Belfast	Northern Ireland	Odyssey Arena
2 May 2009	Dublin	Ireland	The O_{2}
3 May 2009	Dublin	Ireland	The O_{2}
5 May 2009	Newcastle	England	Metro Radio Arena
6 May 2009	Newcastle	England	Metro Radio Arena
8 May 2009	Glasgow	Scotland	SECC Concert Hall 4
9 May 2009	Glasgow	Scotland	SECC Concert Hall 4
11 May 2009	Nottingham	England	Trent FM Arena
12 May 2009	Nottingham	England	Trent FM Arena
13 May 2009	Sheffield	England	Sheffield Arena
15 May 2009	Sheffield	England	Sheffield Arena
16 May 2009	Manchester	England	Manchester Evening News Arena
17 May 2009	Manchester	England	Manchester Evening News Arena
19 May 2009	Liverpool	England	Echo Arena
20 May 2009	Birmingham	England	National Indoor Arena
21 May 2009	Birmingham	England	National Indoor Arena
23 May 2009	London	England	The O_{2} Arena
24 May 2009	London	England	The O_{2} Arena
26 May 2009	London	England	Wembley Arena
27 May 2009	London	England	Wembley Arena
29 May 2009	Manchester	England	Manchester Evening News Arena
30 May 2009	Glasgow	Scotland	SECC Concert Hall 4
1 June 2009	Birmingham	England	National Indoor Arena
2 June 2009	Liverpool	England	Echo Arena
3 June 2009	Liverpool	England	Echo Arena
5 June 2009	Newcastle	England	Metro Radio Arena
6 June 2009	Newcastle	England	Metro Radio Arena

=== Box office score data ===
Venue	City	Tickets sold / Available	Gross revenue
Odyssey Arena	Belfast	25,380 / 25,380 (100%)	$1,081,623
The O_{2}	Dublin	17,337 / 17,337 (100%)	$926,153
Manchester Evening News Arena	Manchester	303,948 / 303,948 (100%)	$14,178,817
Sheffield Arena	Sheffield	303,948 / 303,948 (100%)	$14,178,817
The O_{2} Arena	London	303,948 / 303,948 (100%)	$14,178,817
Metro Radio Arena	Newcastle	303,948 / 303,948 (100%)	$14,178,817
SECC Concert Hall 4	Glasgow	303,948 / 303,948 (100%)	$14,178,817
Trent FM Arena	Nottingham	303,948 / 303,948 (100%)	$14,178,817
Echo Arena	Liverpool	303,948 / 303,948 (100%)	$14,178,817
National Indoor Arena	Birmingham	303,948 / 303,948 (100%)	$14,178,817
Wembley Arena	London	303,948 / 303,948 (100%)	$14,178,817
TOTAL		346,665 / 346,665 (100%)	$16,186,593

== Broadcast and recordings ==
Out of Control: Live from the O_{2} 2009

Video by Girls Aloud
- Released: 5 October 2009
- Recorded: The O_{2} Arena; London, England; 24 May 2009
- Genre: Pop
- Label: Polydor

Girls Aloud chronology
Tangled Up: Live from the O_{2} (2008)	''Out of Control: Live from the O_{2} 2009'' (2009)	Ten: The Videos (2012)

The show was filmed on 24 May 2009 at The O_{2} Arena in London. A DVD called "Out of Control: Live From The O_{2} 2009" was released on 5 October 2009, with a Blu-ray following on 12 October respectively. As well as the full live show, the DVD included several bonus features, including a Girl-cam that allowed the viewer to follow their favourite band member as she performed a song on tour. Also included are the videos for the singles "The Promise", "The Loving Kind" and "Untouchable", as well as the tour screen visuals and interviews. A limited edition was also available from Girls Aloud's official website, including a live CD to accompany the DVD/Blu-ray.

In a review of the DVD, Phil Udell of State said, "Girls Aloud are great pop stars. […] their fourth live DVD finds them bestriding the live pop experience in high heels. […] It's hugely entertaining." CBBC Newsround gave the release three stars out of five, stating, "It's definitely a hit for fans, but it's unlikely to convert anyone who isn't already into their music."

The live video album reached number two on the music DVD chart in its first week, falling to the number three in its second week. The DVD remained at number three in its third week. It returned to number two the following week. The DVD was certified gold by the British Phonographic Industry.

=== DVD track listing ===
- Entire concert
- Special features
  - Music videos for "The Promise", "The Loving Kind" and "Untouchable"
  - Girl cam: "Revolution in the Head" (Cheryl), "Love Machine" (Nicola), "Miss You Bow Wow" (Sarah), "Sound of the Underground" (Nadine), "Love Is the Key" (Kimberley)
  - Behind-the-scenes tour interview
  - Tour screen visuals: "Womanizer", "Love Machine", "Love Is the Key", "Revolution in the Head" and "Biology"

== Critical reception ==
The Out of Control Tour received mostly positive reviews from contemporary music critics. Phil Udell of State wrote, "As a spectacle, it's second to none – opening with the five raised high into the air on moving plinths and taking in floating stages, dancers, pyrotechnics, costume changes, brass sections […] some of the best pop songs this side of the sixties." A reviewer from the Daily Mirror stated that "the slick routines proved why they're the UK's No1 girl band." David Balls of Digital Spy called it Girls Aloud's "most spectacular live show yet." Lauren Mulvenny of the Belfast Telegraph wrote, "the fiery five-piece proved themselves again as the queens of the pop anthem." Gillian Orr of The Independent gave the show three stars out of five, but felt that Girls Aloud should have performed more of their older hit singles as opposed to newer album tracks. Dave Simpson of The Guardian also awarded three stars out of five. Writing for City Life, Simon Donohue comments that "they sing, dance, smile and wave as though they each have an extra set of lungs and a monopoly on confidence."

The show was dubbed Girls Aloud's "raunchiest performance ever" due to provocative performances that employ pole dancing techniques and BDSM. Mulvenny wrote, "The show got even sexier when the costumes took a dominatrix twist […] alongside raunchy routines with shirtless male backing dancers."
