= The Girls Aloud Party =

- The Girls Aloud Party title card.
- Written by: Sketches: Will Ing; Paul Powell
- Directed by: Simon Staffurth; Pre-title Sequence: Chris Cottam
- Starring: Kimberley Walsh; Nicola Roberts; Nadine Coyle; Cheryl Cole; Sarah Harding
- Voices of: Tom Baker
- Country of origin: United Kingdom

Production
- Executive producers: For Globe Productions: Anita Land; For ITV: Lee Connolly; Claire Horton
- Producer: Ruben Ray-Choudhuri
- Production location: The London Studios
- Editors: Andy Marangon; Dominic Leung
- Camera setup: Multi-camera
- Running time: 40 minutes (approx.); 60 minutes (inc. breaks)
- Production companies: Globe Productions; ITV Productions

Original release
- Network: ITV
- Release: 13 December 2008

Related
- ITV Specials; Popstars: The Rivals; Girls Aloud: Home Truths; Girls Aloud: Off The Record; The Passions of Girls Aloud; Cheryl Cole's Night In

The Girls Aloud Party was a one-off Christmas variety show starring British girl group Girls Aloud, produced for ITV. The show was aired on 13 December 2008, in between The X Factor series finale and its results show.

All five members took part in the show, which generally consisted of the group performing songs, intercepted sketches and interaction with the audience.

== Background ==
Girls Aloud performed some of their biggest hits, as well as some tracks from their latest album, Out of Control. James Morrison performed his track "Broken Strings" with Girls Aloud, while Kaiser Chiefs led into "Sound of the Underground" with their own track, "Never Miss a Beat". Along with performing, Girls Aloud performed comic skits in which Cilla Black and Julie Goodyear starred as Nicola Roberts's grandmother and Sarah Harding's mother.

== Promotion ==
On 11 November, the official Girls Aloud website ran a competition in which 100 entrants would win tickets to the show. The show was filmed in London on 2 December, as stated by the announcement.

The programme was first advertised during The X Factor on 29 November 2008.

== Reception ==
The Girls Aloud Party had approximately 8.37 million viewers (32.3%).

== Cast ==
Girls Aloud

- Sarah Harding
- Kimberley Walsh
- Cheryl Cole
- Nicola Roberts
- Nadine Coyle

Special guests

- Paul O'Grady
- Cilla Black
- Julie Goodyear as Sarah’s Mum

Guest performers

- James Morrison
- Kaiser Chiefs

== Setlist ==
1. Intro Video: "Love Is The Key" (Thriller Jill Mix)
2. "The Promise"
3. Christmas Sketch (with Paul O'Grady)
4. "Call the Shots"
5. Memories Sketch (with Little Girls Aloud)
6. "I'll Stand by You"
7. Mothers Sketch (with Little Girls Aloud & Cilla Black)
8. Medley: "Never Miss a Beat"/"Sound of the Underground" (with Kaiser Chiefs)
9. "Love Machine" (contains dance break)
10. Dress Sketch (with Julie Goodyear)
11. "Broken Strings" (with James Morrison)
12. Christmas Card Sketch
13. "Love Is Pain"
14. "The Loving Kind"
15. Old Girls Aloud Sketch
16. "Something Kinda Ooooh"
