= Untouchable (Girls Aloud song) =

2009 Girls Aloud song

Single by Girls Aloud

from the album Out of Control
- B-side: "It's Your Dynamite"; "Love Is the Key" (Thriller Jill mix)
- Released: 27 April 2009
- Genre: Dance-pop; electropop; synth-pop; EDM
- Length: 6:42 (album version); 3:49 (radio mix)
- Label: Fascination
- Songwriters: Miranda Cooper; Brian Higgins; Tim Powell; Matt Gray
- Producers: Brian Higgins; Xenomania

Girls Aloud singles chronology
"The Loving Kind" (2009)	"Untouchable" (2009)	"Something New" (2012)

Music video
- "Untouchable" on YouTube

"Untouchable" is a song performed by British all-female pop group Girls Aloud, taken from their fifth studio album Out of Control (2008). The song was written by Miranda Cooper, Brian Higgins and his production team Xenomania, and produced by Higgins and Xenomania. Influenced by trance music and Balearic beat, the album version of "Untouchable" is almost seven minutes long.

Remixed and re-recorded for single release in April 2009, "Untouchable" memorably became Girls Aloud's first of only two singles to miss the top ten, breaking a run of twenty singles reaching the top ten on the UK Singles Chart. The song received generally favorable reviews from most contemporary music critics, who praised its ambition. "Untouchable" would be the final release by the group before their hiatus.

In the accompanying music video, inspired by Stanley Kubrick's film 2001: Space Odyssey, the group members travel through space and approaches Earth in illuminated glass spheres, resembling meteorites. "Untouchable" was promoted through an appearance on Dancing on Ice, and was later performed on the group's Out of Control Tour (2009), Ten: The Hits Tour (2013), and The Girls Aloud Show (2024).

== Background and composition ==
"Untouchable" is a trance-inspired "rave ballad," which marries "Balearic guitar lines with a pulsating techno throb." The song is Girls Aloud's longest yet, at a full runtime of 6:45. "Untouchable" follows the common verse-chorus form, but includes a number of instrumental solos. Nadine Coyle sings a middle 8 ("Without any meaning, we're just skin and bone...") as the music drops out. The song builds back up and concludes with a final chorus.

The "emotional twangy guitar noise" heard in the song was the result of Xenomania musician Jason Resch responding to Higgins' request for something "special". Higgins left the song at its full length, knowing that "The Promise" and "The Loving Kind" would be the first two singles and he could remix "Untouchable" for single release at a later point. The song was "chopped and changed for its single release", with Girls Aloud's vocals being vocodered.

In interview with The Daily Star, band member Sarah Harding commented on the track: "When we first heard [it] we thought it was so Nineties, a proper pop dance song. It’s got that trancy, chilled Ibiza feel. I get lost in the music at the beginning and then it builds and builds and builds. You just want to go mental." In 2023, Cheryl Cole ranked the song among Girls Aloud's best songs, referring to it as a "modern art masterpiece."

== Release ==
"Untouchable" was selected as the third single from Out of Control after it fared best in a fan poll on Girls Aloud's official forum. It was announced as the single on 20 February 2009. "Untouchable" was released on CD single and 7" vinyl formats on 27 April, while digital download formats were available a day earlier. The CD includes a previously unreleased b-side entitled "It's Your Dynamite", which Digital Spy says "matches the standard set on their previous releases [...] a treat for the ears." The 7" vinyl picture disc format includes the Thriller Jill Mix of "Love Is the Key", as heard on The Girls Aloud Party opening credits and commercials. A promo CD was released with various remixes previously unreleased or part of the singles collection.

== Critical response ==
"Untouchable" received generally favourable reviews from music critics. Slant Magazine said that it was "one of Girls Aloud's finest achievements." Matthew Horton of The Quietus labelled the song as an "epic, a nearly-seven-minute monster". Similarly, John Murphy from MusicOMH called the track an "epic seven-minute electro-thumper which builds slowly, explodes into life, drops out brilliantly, then bursts back into life". In a blog for BBC, Fraser McAlpine agreed that "it's epic and dreamy and a bit of a diversion from the usual GA pattern while still being recognisably very Girls Aloud." It was also praised by NME's Jaimie Hodgson, described as "post-Ibiza power-balladeering". The song was referred to as "fast, electronic and fantastic" with an immense build-up to the chorus by Peter Robinson from Popjustice. Talia Kraines of BBC Music felt "the Balearic bliss of epic seven minute marathon Untouchable [...] prove[s] that you don't have to be brassy to be brilliant."

Michael Cragg from The Guardian called it a proper "statement song", as well as "the band's most effortless-sounding single" without ever feeling overly long. Nick Levine of Digital Spy said the song "serves as the centrepiece" on the album and that even the radio edit "remains surprising, thrilling and strangely moving - in short, classic Girls Aloud." Matthew Chisling from AllMusic deemed it "the album's most club-friendly smash". Newsround declared it "seems to want to be a ballad and a dance track without doing either well." GayNZ.com's Andrew Grear stated that the song "works....but possibly not as well as the girls were hoping." Andy Gill from The Independent called it a "stomp-a-matic filler" from the album.

== Chart performance ==
"Untouchable" entered the UK Singles Chart on 29 March 2009 at number 54. It entered the top forty three weeks later. On 3 May 2009, it officially reached number eleven. On the Irish Singles Chart, the song entered at number 38 and peaked at number nineteen. After the single failed to achieve top ten success when it was released late April 2009, a fan-created Facebook campaign was started nearly a year later (January 2010). The group hoped to push the single into the top ten, reviving and continuing Girls Aloud's streak. The campaign failed, with "Untouchable" only charting at number 152.

== Music video ==
The music video for "Untouchable" was directed by Marco Puig with post-production from The Mill. Shot in a west London studio on 18 March 2009, the filming took sixteen hours. The video premiered on 25 March 2009 on 4music at 7:00pm GMT and was shown again at 11:05pm on Channel 4. The "Untouchable" video was made available on MSN the following day.

The futuristic video was inspired by Stanley Kubrick's classic science fiction film 2001: A Space Odyssey. Girls Aloud appear in "sci-fi inspired PVC leotards," travelling through space and approaching Earth in illuminated glass spheres (resembling meteorites), falling at impossible speeds toward Earth. After the second verse, the words "Alert: Condition Red" appear on the screen and the girls have trouble in their bubble-like force fields. They begin to plummet through Earth's atmosphere, with the spheres erupting in flames. Still burning, they pass an aeroplane and approach a city. The video ends with televisions showing the breaking news as they hit the ground, with a reporter describing it as a "meteor shower" before turning to static. Digital Spy lauded the "Untouchable" music video as "almost as exciting as the song itself."

== Live performances ==
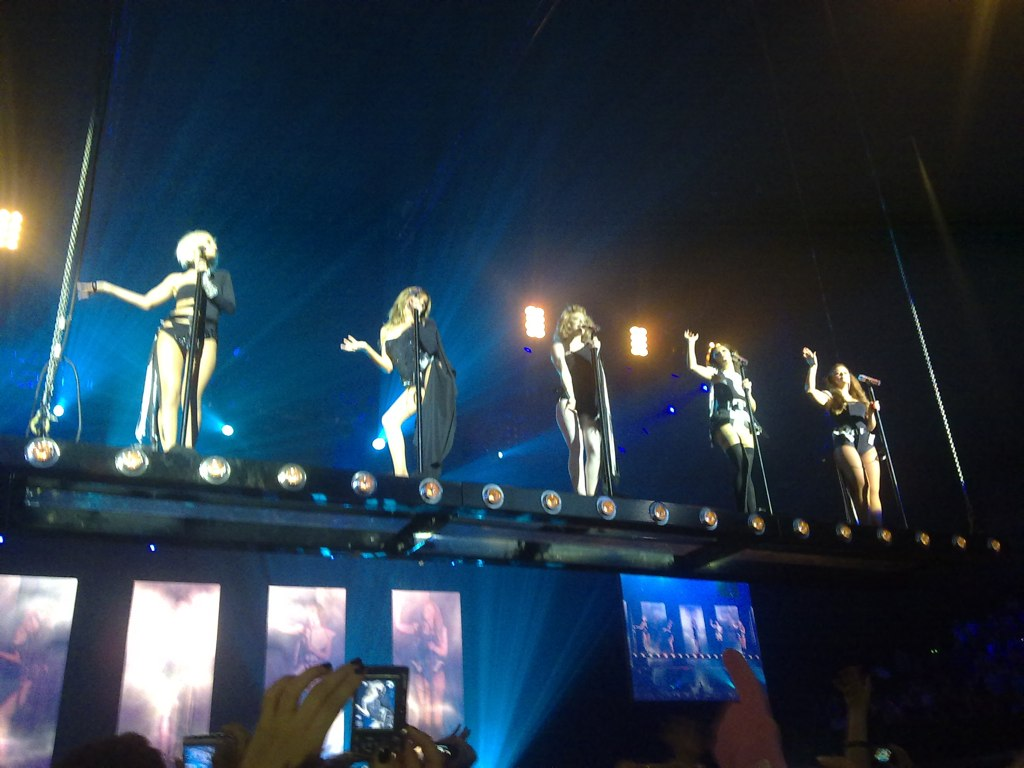
Girls Aloud performing "Untouchable" during the Out of Control Tour in 2009.

The first performance of the song occurred at the Dancing on Ice semi-finals on 15 March 2009. Girls Aloud entered on wires suspended from the ceiling and performed the song whilst ice dancers Torvill and Dean skated around them. Girls Aloud wore draped Grecian dresses. Smoke followed the group as they were lowered down on to individual podiums. As Nadine sang the final verse, Torvill and Dean were raised into the air on wires. The song ended with an explosion of pyrotechnics. Torvill and Dean were criticised for "completely and utterly ruining the momentum and energy."

"Untouchable" was one of the most significant performances of Girls Aloud's 2009 Out of Control Tour. The song is "performed over the crowd on a flying platform," which Girls Aloud used to travel to a smaller stage in the middle of the arena. The group wore science fiction-inspired outfits, designed by Welsh fashion designer Julien MacDonald, along with the rest of the show's costumes. According to Lauren Mulvenny from the Belfast Telegraph, the performance got "a great crowd reaction." The song was performed on 2013 with the girls singing it on a stage in the middle of the arena. During 2024's The Girls Aloud Show, it served as the opening number with the girls being surrounded by a pink backdrop as they sang it.

== Formats and track listings ==
These are the formats and track listings of major single releases of "Untouchable".

UK CD

1. "Untouchable" (Radio Mix) – 3:49
2. "It's Your Dynamite" (Girls Aloud, Xenomania) – 4:21

UK 7" picture disc

1. "Untouchable" (Radio Mix) – 3:49
2. "Love Is the Key" (Thriller Jill Mix) – 6:35

Digital download

1. "Untouchable" (Radio Mix) – 3:49
2. "Untouchable" (Bimbo Jones Radio Edit) – 3:46
3. "Untouchable" (Bimbo Jones Club Mix) – 6:04

iTunes download

1. "Untouchable" (Radio Mix) – 3:49
2. "Untouchable" (Album Version Edit) – 3:03
3. "Untouchable" (Bimbo Jones Club Mix) – 6:04

The Singles Boxset (CD21) / Digital EP

1. "Untouchable" (Radio Mix) – 3:49
2. "It's Your Dynamite" – 4:21
3. "Love Is the Key" (Thriller Jill Mix) – 6:35
4. "Untouchable" (Album Version Edit) – 3:03
5. "Untouchable" (Bimbo Jones Club Mix) – 6:04
6. "Untouchable" (Bimbo Jones Radio Edit) – 3:46
7. "Untouchable" (Bimbo Jones Dub) – 6:02

Promo CD

1. "Untouchable" (Almighty Essential Radio Edit) – 4:36
2. "Untouchable" (Almighty Essential Mix) – 9:11
3. "Untouchable" (Almighty Alternative Vocal Mix) – 9:11
4. "Untouchable" (Almighty Essential Dub) – 9:13
5. "Untouchable" (Almighty Essential Instrumental) – 9:11

== Credits and personnel ==
- Bass guitar: Kieran Jons
- Engineering: Toby Scott, Dan Aslet
- Guitars: Nick Coler, Jason Resch
- Keyboards and programming: Tim Powell, Brian Higgins, Miranda Cooper, Owen Parker, Fred Falke, Sacha Collisson, Matt Gray
- Mixing: Tim Powell, Brian Higgins
- Songwriting: Miranda Cooper, Brian Higgins, Tim Powell, Matt Gray
- Published by Warner/Chappell Music and Xenomania Music

== Charts ==
=== Weekly charts ===
Weekly chart performance for "Untouchable"
Chart (2009)	Peak position
European Hot 100 Singles (Billboard)	39
Ireland (IRMA)	19
Scotland Singles (OCC)	2
UK Singles (OCC)	11
UK Airplay (Music Week)	5

=== Year-end charts ===
2009 year-end chart performance for "Untouchable"
Chart (2009)	Position
UK Singles (OCC)	166
