= Edei =

British singer-songwriter

- Born: Emma Deigman; September 19, 1988 (age 38); Buckinghamshire, United Kingdom
- Origin: English
- Genre: Soul-pop
- Occupation: Singer-songwriter
- Years active: 2010–present
- Label: Alma Recordings

Edei (born Emma Deigman) is an English singer-songwriter and actress.

== Music career ==
Edei's musical career began when she made her West End debut in Les Misérables, at aged seven, playing the young Eponine in the show's record-breaking opening run, before she went on performing at the Royal Variety Performance Show for Annie, when she was 10 years old. She also performed "Hard Knock Life" alongside Jay-Z on Top of the Pops.

For the next few years she wrote to producers, seeking a solo career. Rod Stewart also played a significant role on her career, whom Edei said helped her break the States. She had the opportunity to perform in front of large crowds, and she began to receive offers to become a part of girl groups and audition for talent shows such as The X Factor. However, she was determined to become a successful solo artist on her own, with her own music.

When she toured the UK as a supporting artist to Girls Aloud in 2009, Edei was using her birth, Emma Deigman. Her debut single "In My Bed" was released through Alma Recordings on 12 July 2010, and the follow-up "Loved" was released on 16 January 2011 after much support from BBC Radio 2 (including a record of the week from Ken Bruce) and a nationwide tour with JLS.

Edei's debut album was written with Boston-born, Dublin-based producer Misreid and singer-songwriter Conner Reeves (whose writing credits include songs for Joss Stone, Ava Leigh and Tina Turner). Edei was not known as a celebrity in the US until 2015. She has been performing and acting in plays and playing small glitzy clubs, mostly for charity, and has donated her time and talent volunteering her services for charitable organizations.

== Acting ==
Edei attended the Jackie Palmer Stage School and Hurtwood House School.

Edei first appeared as young saffron in Fay Weldon's adaptation novel of Big Women. In the 2001 film Last Orders, She and her sister Laura, was both playing the role of Sally, Edei playing the 10-year-old and Laura the 5-year-old Sally. She later appeared in a 2002 drama series Daniel Deronda. Edei is also known for her acting credits, especially in the U.K.

== Personal life ==
Edei was born as Emma Deigman in Buckinghamshire, UK. Edei's mother, Vicky, is a former casting agent who produced Wild Bill, and her late father Patrick, who died in 2019, was a property developer, came from Helensburgh. She grew up in Great Missenden, and has three siblings, of whom the youngest is a tennis player, who played in the 2011 Wimbledon Championships – Girls' Singles.

Edei attended a boarding school in Berkhamsted, but left when her father got cancer to help look after her younger brother and sister.

In April 2024, Edei confirmed her engagement with film director and producer, David M. Rosenthal. They got married on December 14. 2024.Their son Bode Patrick Rosenthal was born on February 13,2025.
