= Sexy! No No No... =

2007 single by Girls Aloud

Single by Girls Aloud

from the album Tangled Up
- B-side: "Dog Without a Bone"
- Released: 31 August 2007
- Recorded: 2007
- Genre: Electropunk
- Length: 3:18
- Label: Fascination
- Songwriters: Pete Agnew; Myra Antonia Boyle; Manny Charlton; Cheryl Cole; Nick Coler; Miranda Cooper; Lisa Cowling; Nadine Coyle; Matthew Del Gray; Sarah Harding; Brian Higgins; Dan McCafferty; Tim Powell; Nicola Roberts; Darrell Sweet; Kimberley Walsh; Carla Marie Williams
- Producers: Brian Higgins; Xenomania

Girls Aloud singles chronology
"Walk This Way" (2007)	"Sexy! No No No..." (2007)	"Call the Shots" (2007)

Music video
- "Sexy! No No No…" on YouTube

"Sexy! No No No..." is a song by British-Irish girl group Girls Aloud from their fourth studio album, Tangled Up (2007). In April 2007, the group announced that they would release a new album, due in November of that year. In July 2007, it was announced that "Sexy! No No No...", due to be released in September, would be as the first single from Tangled Up, with a radio premiere scheduled for 20 July. The track leaked a few hours prior to the premiere. "Sexy! No No No..." was written by Girls Aloud and Xenomania, and is an electropunk song that incorporates a sample of Nazareth's 1975 song "Hair of the Dog", for which they received a writing credit. Composed of three songs welded together, the song avoids the verse-chorus form present in most contemporary pop music, similar to their previous single "Biology" (2005).

"Sexy! No No No..." received generally favourable reviews from music critics, and peaked at number 5 on the UK Singles Chart, continuing the band's string of hits by becoming their fifteenth consecutive single to chart within the top ten. The song also peaked at number 11 on the Irish Singles Chart. The accompanying music video was directed by Trudy Bellinger, and features the group singing and dancing through pins and wires in black latex catsuits and red dresses. To promote the song, Girls Aloud performed "Sexy! No No No..." at Dance X, ITV1 special Saturday Night Divas and T4 on the Beach. The track was also included in most of the group's concert tours.

== Background ==
In April 2007, the group announced that they would release a new album in November of that year. The production and songwriting began with producer Brian Higgins meeting each member of the group individually, and discussing their life since the release of Chemistry (2005). Higgins took inspiration from these discussions in his songwriting, with bandmate Nicola Roberts explaining that "it's important he's up to date with where we are. Our songs have to reflect us so that's why we do it." "Sexy! No No No..." was then written by Girls Aloud with production team Xenomania. Roberts, Cheryl Cole, Sarah Harding and Kimberley Walsh recorded vocals for the song in London, England, while Nadine Coyle recorded her vocals in Los Angeles, California.

== Release ==
In July 2007, Girls Aloud announced that they would release "Sexy! No No No...", as the first single from Tangled Up, in September 2007. The radio premiere of the song was scheduled for the morning of 20 July 2007 on BBC Radio 1, however, it leaked in full online earlier the same day at 02:21 GMT. "Sexy! No No No..." was released for digital download on 31 August 2007, while it was also made available on two different CD single formats on 3 September 2007. The first disc included a live version of "Something Kinda Ooooh" (2006), recorded at the Bournemouth International Centre. The second CD format featured Tony Lamezma's "Yes Yes Yes" Mix of "Sexy! No No No..." and also a new track as a b-side, entitled "Dog Without a Bone". The b-side was originally written in 2006 in an attempt to come up with a lead single for the group's first compilation album, The Sound of Girls Aloud: The Greatest Hits, however, "Something Kinda Ooooh" was released instead. "Dog Without a Bone" was Popjustice's song of the day on 20 August 2007.

== Composition ==
Girls Aloud - Sexy! No No No...
A 19 second sample of "Sexy! No No No...", in which Cole's vocals during the introduction were vocodered, before the electropunk chorus starts with an incorporated sample from Nazareth's 1975 track "Hair of the Dog".

"Sexy! No No No..." is an electropunk song, which consists of three songs welded together, according to journalist Peter Robinson: one with a samba rhythm, one with a sped-up sample and a breakbeat, and an intro from elsewhere. The track opens with Cole singing over "spooky" instrumentation. Her vocals have been vocodered and she sings "Cause I've been sitting back, no chance of falling / Hoping that nothing ever blows, no no / Boy, did you ever think that loving would be / Nothing more than walking me home, no no". As the chorus begins, the song incorporates a sample from Scottish rock band Nazareth's 1975 track "Hair of the Dog", and the group starts singing, "Did you tell him? No no no / Give him kisses? No no no / Whisper honey? No no no / You're delicious? Hell no". John Murphy of musicOMH noted that "Sexy! No No No.." is not "structured like a proper pop song - there's no verse-chorus-verse". The instrumentation of "Sexy! No No No..." is composed of multi-layered guitar riffs and "euphoric woo woo-oo harmonies", while the song's structure follows as introduction, chorus, chorus, verse, bridge, chorus, middle eight, verse. A Newsround reviewer described the lyrical content, saying that Girls Aloud are "trying a different approach to getting the guy", in that "instead of being 'sexy', they've backed off."

== Reception ==
=== Critical response ===
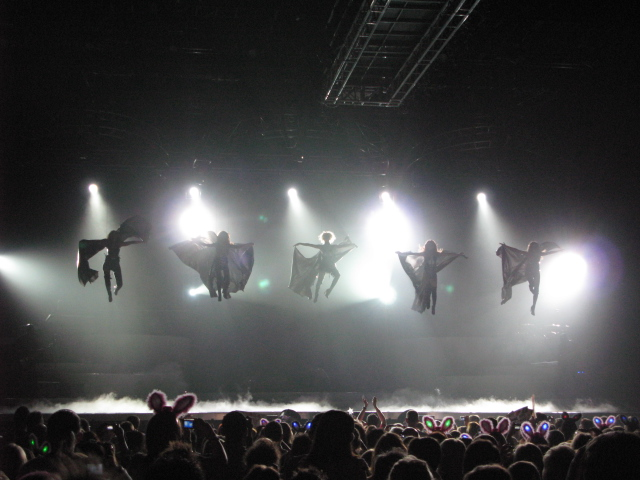
Girls Aloud performing "Sexy! No No No..." on the Tangled Up Tour (2008).

"Sexy! No No No..." received positive reviews from music critics. John Lucas of Allmusic described the "pounding electro-punk number" as "one of the most daring songs they've yet released," while a reviewer for Newsround deemed it "yet another sample of their perfect pop: bold, sassy, slightly loopy and unbelievably catchy." Fraser McAlpine of BBC thought that "Sexy! No No No..." is "kinda dumb, kinda sassy, kinda pumping and kinda 'what on EARTH is THAT?', just like all the best Aloud anthems are", while Nick Levine of Digital Spy rated it four out of five stars, noting that Xenomania sacrificed the "conventional song structure in the name of keeping those hooks coming thick and fast - and quite right too." Levine also praised Girls Aloud for restyling themselves "as teasing minxes, claiming that they've 'dropped their d-d-dirty style'". Lauren Murphy of Entertainment.ie said that "Sexy! No No No..." was a "stellar single", describing it as an "'80s-flavoured radio hit", while Matt O'Leary of Virgin Media stated that the song "slam[s] home the power-pop message we're used to [from Girls Aloud]."

=== Chart performance ===
Because it was available to download one week prior to the release of the CD single, "Sexy! No No No..." debuted at number 64 on the UK Singles Chart, based solely on digital downloads. The following week, the single reached a new peak at number five, continuing Girls Aloud's string of hits by becoming their fifteenth consecutive single to chart within the top ten. It spent a total of ten weeks on the top 40, and is among fifteen best-selling singles by the group. On the week ending 22 September 2007, "Sexy! No No No..." debuted at number 11 on the Euro Digital Chart compiled by Billboard. The track peaked at the same position on the Irish Singles Chart.

== Music video ==
The music video was directed by Trudy Bellinger, and premiered on 13 August 2007. It opens with Cheryl singing the introduction, as she and the group are seen wearing latex catsuits while standing in front of shiny red material. The material is being used by a seamstress who is starting work on a dress. As the chorus begins, the camera zooms out to show the girls wearing giant inflatable red dresses. The seamstress starts putting large pins into her dress, poking their way around the girls, until the pins start tearing into their dresses. The pins tear the dresses off and the girls are back in their catsuits, surrounded by the threads of their dresses. Journalist Peter Robinson deemed the video "iconic" and "stylish".

== Live performances ==
Girls Aloud first performed "Sexy! No No No..." at the T4 on the Beach special on 22 July 2007. The group also performed it at Dance X on 18 August 2007, at ITV1 special Saturday Night Divas on 3 November 2007, and at the V Festival in 2008. The same year, "Sexy! No No No..." served as the introduction for the Tangled Up Tour. During the first part of the performance, the girls were suspended on wires as they hovered in the air in black cloaks. As the song's chorus began, Girls Aloud removed their cloaks to reveal stage outfits designed by Julien Macdonald. For 2009's Out of Control Tour, "Sexy! No No No..." was remixed with parts of "Disturbia" by Barbadian recording artist Rihanna. In 2013, the song was performed during the second act of the .

== Formats and track listings ==
- CD single – Part 1
1. "Sexy! No No No..." – 3:18
2. "Something Kinda Ooooh" (Live at Bournemouth International Centre) – 3:24
- CD single – Part 2
1. "Sexy! No No No..." – 3:18
2. "Sexy! No No No..." (Tony Lamezma's "Yes Yes Yes" Mix) – 6:13
3. "Dog Without a Bone" – 4:00
4. "Sexy! No No No..." (video) – 3:18
- Digital download
1. "Sexy! No No No..." – 3:18

The Singles Boxset

1. "Sexy! No No No..." – 3:18
2. "Something Kinda Ooooh" (Live in Bournemouth) – 3:24
3. "Sexy! No No No..." (Tony Lamezma's "Yes Yes Yes" mix) – 6:13
4. "Dog Without A Bone" – 4:00
5. "Sexy! No No No..." (Xenomania Club mix) – 5:00
6. "Sexy! No No No..." (Flip & Fill mix) – 6:07
7. "Sexy! No No No..." (video) – 3:18

Digital EP

1. "Sexy! No No No..." – 3:15
2. "Something Kinda Ooooh" (Live in Bournemouth) – 3:23
3. "Sexy! No No No..." (Tony Lamezma's "Yes Yes Yes" mix) – 6:13
4. "Dog Without a Bone" – 4:00
5. "Sexy! No No No..." (Xenomania Club mix) – 4:56
6. "Sexy! No No No..." (Flip & Fill mix) – 6:05

== Credits and personnel ==
Credits are adapted from the liner notes of Tangled Up.

- Guitar – Nick Coler, Owen Parker
- Keyboard – Miranda Cooper, Brian Higgins, Tim Powell, Toby Scott
- Mastering – Dick Beetham for 360 Mastering
- Mixing – Jeremy Wheatley
- Production – Brian Higgins, Xenomania
- Programming – Miranda Cooper, Brian Higgins, Tim Powell, Toby Scott
- Songwriting – Girls Aloud, Nazareth, Xenomania
  - Contains a sample of "Hair of the Dog" by Nazareth (Dan McCafferty, Darrell Sweet, Manny Charlton, Pete Agnew)
- Vocals – Girls Aloud
- Published by Warner/Chappell Music and Xenomania Music

== Charts ==
=== Weekly charts ===
Weekly chart performance for "Sexy! No No No..."
Chart (2007–2008)	Peak position
El Salvador (EFE)	3
Europe (Eurochart Hot 100)	17
Ireland (IRMA)	11
Scottish Singles Sales (Official Charts)	2
UK Singles (Official Charts)	5
UK Airplay (Music Week)	30

=== Year-end charts ===
Year-end chart performance for "Sexy! No No No..."
Chart (2007)	Position
UK Singles (OCC)	104

== Certifications ==
Certifications and sales for "Sexy! No No No..."
Region	Certification	Certified units/sales
United Kingdom (BPI)	Silver	200,000^{‡}
^{‡} Sales+streaming figures based on certification alone.

== Release history ==
Release dates and formats for "Sexy! No No No..."
Region	Date	Format(s)	Label(s)	Ref.
United Kingdom	31 August 2007	Digital download	Polydor	
United Kingdom	3 September 2007	CD single	Fascination Records	
United States	9 October 2007	Digital download	Polydor Records	
