= Tangled Up Tour =

2008 concert tour by Girls Aloud

- Tour by Girls Aloud
- Cover of the tour programme
- Associated album: Tangled Up
- Start date: 3 May 2008
- End date: 29 August 2008
- Legs: 2
- No. of shows: 35

Girls Aloud concert chronology
- The Greatest Hits Tour (2007); Tangled Up Tour (2008); Out of Control Tour (2009)

The Tangled Up Tour was the fourth concert tour by English-Irish girl group Girls Aloud. It supported their fourth studio album Tangled Up. Tour dates were announced in November 2007. Girls Aloud performed twenty-four shows at arenas across the United Kingdom and Ireland, making this tour their third to reach arenas. The tour commenced in Belfast on 3 May 2008 and concluded in Birmingham on 4 June. Girls Aloud also performed eleven open-air concerts over the summer.

The show was divided into five unique sections with distinct costumes, including the encore. The stage outfits, designed by Welsh designer Julien MacDonald, received comparisons to Madonna's Blond Ambition World Tour. Girls Aloud began the show suspended from the ceiling wearing black cloaks before performing the opening number "Sexy! No No No...". The set list mostly included songs from Tangled Up, as well as earlier singles and album tracks. A ballad section took place on a smaller stage in the centre of the arena. Billiam, Luigi Masi, and The Saturdays provided support for Girls Aloud on the tour.

The tour generated positive reviews from critics, who noted the performance as being the most sexual of Girls Aloud's career to date. The concert at the O2 Arena in London on 17 May 2008 was filmed and shown live at 50 Vue cinemas across the United Kingdom. This footage was released on DVD and Blu-ray under the title Tangled Up: Live from The O_{2} 2008 in October 2008. The tour was also broadcast on a number of television channels.

== Background and development ==
The first dates were announced by various news sources towards the end of November 2007. Pre-sale tickets were offered on Girls Aloud's official website on 22 November 2007. In March 2008, Girls Aloud signed a deal to front an ad campaign for a new low-calorie Kit Kat bar called "Senses". The manufacturer sponsored the tour, and handed out chocolate bars for free at the arenas.

The announcement of the tour helped to stop rumours that the band were splitting up. The stories surfaced after Nadine Coyle pulled out of a reality show for the second time. It was widely reported in April 2008 that Cheryl Cole was working on solo material with producer T2. These accusations were quickly denied, with Cole saying that she "had been in tour rehearsals every day." The band put a further stop to these rumours at their London show, by announcing that they would be recording a new album.

The show reportedly cost an estimated £3 million to stage, with £250,000 worth of pyrotechnics. Girls Aloud called the show their most "extravagant and rewarding" yet. Sarah Harding said that "over the years it gets bigger and more elaborate." The stage outfits were designed by Welsh designer Julien MacDonald, London-based Norwegian designer Kristian Aadnevik, and Liza Bruce. MacDonald designed "a set of crystal beaded numbers drenched in his signature sparkle" and "a collection of sci-fi inspired bodysuits." Kimberley Walsh told press that the band was "really excited about the tour" and had "loads of things planned." Luigi Masi, Billiam and The Saturdays provided support for Girls Aloud on the tour.

Girls Aloud played a number of festivals and open-air concerts over the summer. They were scheduled to perform at the Beamish Summer Festival, held at Beamish Hall in August as part of a two-day event organised by Hope 4 Kidz. However, due to weather problems, the concert was cancelled. Girls Aloud also played at Pop in the Park and 2008's V Festival. They previously performed at V Festival in 2006 with a shortened set of their Chemistry Tour.

== Concert synopsis ==
For the opening of the Tangled Up Tour, the band members were suspended from the ceiling wearing black cloaks. The video screen shows Cheryl Cole singing the vocodered intro to "Sexy! No No No…". Girls Aloud reached the stage as the song became more uptempo, removing their cloaks and revealing sci-fi inspired bodysuits. They then perform Tangled Up album track "Girl Overboard". During "Sound of the Underground", Girls Aloud use "semi-naked male dancers as both props and furniture. The first section of the show is finished by "Close to Love", another album track.

For the second section of the show, Girls Aloud wear black cabaret numbers. They perform "Can't Speak French", followed by "Love Machine". Album track "Black Jacks" is "performed on a rotating stage complete with a hugely energetic dance routine from both the girls and their dancers" and features a "snappy monochrome stage design." "Biology" is "slowed down slightly" and "interrupted" with a jazz interlude.

During their ballad section, Girls Aloud perform "Whole Lotta History" and "I'll Stand by You". They also perform a stripped-down cover of Robyn's "With Every Heartbeat". They originally performed the song for BBC Radio 1's Live Lounge, a recording of which is available on the "Can't Speak French" single.

Following a brief video introduction, Girls Aloud perform "Fling" in gold sequined mini-dresses. The group also perform a cover of Salt-n-Pepa's "Push It". They then perform a medley of "Wake Me Up" and "Walk This Way". Additionally, Cheryl Cole sang a "quick incerpt" of Kelis' "Trick Me" at the end of "Control of the Knife", noted by critics as a "tabloid-friendly decision." The set ends with "Call the Shots" and "Jump".

For the encore of "Something Kinda Ooooh", Girls Aloud wear high-cut Liza Bruce day-glo coloured leotards and nude fishnets amidst pyrotechnics.

== Opening acts ==
- The Saturdays
- Billiam
- Luigi Masi
- Stevie Hoang
- Jessie J

== Setlist ==
The following set list is representative of the show in May 2008. It is not representative of all concerts for the duration of the tour.

Section 1

1. "Sexy! No No No..." (with video introduction)
2. "Girl Overboard"
3. "Sound of the Underground"
4. "Close to Love"

Section 2

5. "Can't Speak French"
6. "Love Machine"
7. "Black Jacks"
8. "Biology"

Section 3

9. "Whole Lotta History"
10. "With Every Heartbeat" (Robyn cover)
11. "I'll Stand By You"

Section 4

12. "Fling" (with video introduction)
13. "Push It" (Salt-N-Pepa cover)
14. "Wake Me Up" / "Walk This Way"
15. "Control of the Knife" (contains excerpts of "Trick Me")
16. "Call the Shots"
17. "Jump"

Encore

18. "Something Kinda Ooooh"

== Tour dates ==
List of concerts, showing date, city, country and venue
Date	City	Country	Venue
Leg 1
3 May 2008	Belfast	Northern Ireland	Odyssey Arena
4 May 2008	Belfast	Northern Ireland	Odyssey Arena
5 May 2008	Belfast	Northern Ireland	Odyssey Arena
7 May 2008	Glasgow	Scotland	SECC Concert Hall 4
8 May 2008	Glasgow	Scotland	SECC Concert Hall 4
10 May 2008	Bournemouth	England	Bournemouth International Centre
11 May 2008	Bournemouth	England	Bournemouth International Centre
13 May 2008	Brighton	England	Brighton Centre
14 May 2008	Brighton	England	Brighton Centre
16 May 2008	London	England	The O_{2} Arena
17 May 2008	London	England	The O_{2} Arena
18 May 2008	Cardiff	Wales	Cardiff International Arena
20 May 2008	Nottingham	England	Trent FM Arena
21 May 2008	Sheffield	England	Sheffield Arena
23 May 2008	Birmingham	England	National Indoor Arena
24 May 2008	Newcastle	England	Metro Radio Arena
25 May 2008	Newcastle	England	Metro Radio Arena
27 May 2008	Aberdeen	Scotland	Press and Journal Arena
28 May 2008	Aberdeen	Scotland	Press and Journal Arena
30 May 2008	Liverpool	England	Echo Arena
31 May 2008	Manchester	England	Manchester Evening News Arena
1 June 2008	Manchester	England	Manchester Evening News Arena
3 June 2008	Cardiff	Wales	Cardiff International Arena
4 June 2008	Birmingham	England	LG Arena
Leg 2
4 July 2008	Warwick	England	Warwick Castle
17 July 2008	Esher	England	Sandown Park Racecourse
18 July 2008	Newmarket	England	Newmarket Racecourse
25 July 2008	Edinburgh	Scotland	Edinburgh Castle
27 July 2008	East Cowes	England	Osborne House
3 August 2008	Acton	England	Dorfold Hall
16 August 2008	Elton	England	Elton Hall
16 August 2008	Weston-under-Lizard	England	Weston Park
17 August 2008	Chelmsford	England	Hylands Park
23 August 2008	Battle	England	Battle Abbey
29 August 2008	Harewood	England	Harewood House

Cancellations and rescheduled shows

24 August 2008	Stanley, England	Beamish Hall	This concert was cancelled due to weather problems.
14 September 2008	Derry Hill, England	Bowood House	This concert was cancelled due to weather problems.

== Broadcasts and recordings ==
Tangled Up: Live from The O_{2} 2008

Video by Girls Aloud
- Released: 27 October 2008
- Recorded: O_{2} Arena 17 May 2008
- Genre: Pop
- Length: 102 minutes
- Label: Polydor

Girls Aloud chronology
Style (2007)	''Tangled Up: Live from The O_{2} 2008'' (2008)	Girls Aloud: Out Of Control Live at the O2 (2009)

The tour was recorded on 17 May at The O2 Arena in London and shown live across 50 Vue cinemas up and down the country. Footage was released later that year when Tangled Up: Live from The O_{2} 2008 was released on DVD and Blu-ray on 27 October 2008. In addition to the show, bonus features included a backstage documentary, music videos and trailers for the Tangled Up album. The DVD was certified gold by the British Phonographic Industry. A shortened version of the recording was shown on Channel 4 various times in December 2008.

== Critical response ==
The Tangled Up Tour received mostly positive reviews from contemporary music critics. The Independent gave the show four stars, saying that "even their between-song chatter is amusing". Although low points were noted, the review continued that "Girls Aloud remain confidently the only pop show in town." The Daily Record said they "pulled out all the stops." Becky Reed of Clickmusic gave the show four stars and stated, "Never mind that original banter and individual personality is lacking, the chemistry and magic is all there in the spectacle of the show."

The Mirror called it "the most sexually-charged performance of their career". Many reviews focused on Girls Aloud's provocative attire, comparing it to Madonna and Jean Paul Gaultier's famous designs for her 1990 Blond Ambition World Tour. Reed complimented the costumes: "Girls Aloud have finally moved on from the market stall clobber and now resemble the Kylie-esque superstars they deserve to be."

The Times only gave the show two stars. "The songs varied wildly in quality. While upbeat belters... tapped into the hedonistic rush of classic gay disco, too much of the set felt graceless and flat." The critique even said "the famous five could easily have been interchangeable Stepford androids." Despite having praise for the girls, Nick Levine of Digital Spy observed "one too many bum notes."

Many shows on the Tangled Up Tour sold out including two dates at the UK's most renowned venue, the O_{2} in London and because of the overwhelming success of the initial dates announced, more were added due to public demand.
