= Call the Shots =

2007 single by Girls Aloud

Single by Girls Aloud

from the album Tangled Up
- B-side: "Rehab" (Live Lounge cover); "Blow Your Cover"
- Written: 2005–2006
- Released: 26 November 2007
- Recorded: 2007
- Genre: Electropop; downtempo
- Length: 3:44
- Label: Fascination
- Songwriters: Miranda Cooper; Brian Higgins; Tim Powell; Lisa Cowling; Giselle Somerville
- Producers: Brian Higgins; Xenomania

Girls Aloud singles chronology
"Sexy! No No No..." (2007)	"Call the Shots" (2007)	"Can't Speak French" (2008)

Music video
- "Call the Shots" on YouTube

"Call the Shots" is a song by British-Irish girl group Girls Aloud from their fourth studio album, Tangled Up (2007). The song was written by Miranda Cooper, with inspiration from an article about the advance of women in business, and Brian Higgins, Tim Powell, Lisa Cowling, and Giselle Somerville also received songwriting credits. Polydor Records originally intended to release it as the lead single for The Sound of Girls Aloud: The Greatest Hits (2006); however, "Something Kinda Ooooh" was selected instead. In September 2007, "Call the Shots" leaked online, and on 26 November of the same year, it was released as the second single from Tangled Up through Fascination Records, a week after the album's release.

The song was produced by Xenomania. In 2008, the song won the award for the Popjustice £20 Music Prize, an annual prize awarded by a panel of judges organised by music website Popjustice to the singer(s) of the best British pop single of the past year. "Call the Shots" proved to be commercially successful upon its release, charting at number three on the UK Singles Chart, continuing the band's string of hits by becoming their sixteenth consecutive single to chart within the top ten, and being later certified Silver by the British Phonographic Industry. The song also peaked at number nine on the Irish Singles Chart.

The accompanying music video was directed by Sean de Sparengo, and features the girls in purple dresses performing on Malibu Beach at night with flames and white fabric surrounding them. Each member of the band is also shown other locations, following several story lines. "Call the Shots" was promoted through numerous live appearances, including a high-profile performance on The X Factor, and has since been performed on four of Girls Aloud's subsequent concert tours. Several artists and bands including Coldplay and Mark Morriss have covered the song.

== Background ==
The first part of "Call the Shots" to be composed was the instrumentation, which was done by Xenomania in 2005. The lyrics of the song were written in 2006, when songwriter Miranda Cooper was "inspired by an article she read on something called (coincidentally) the Miranda Complex, named after the ambitious lawyer in Sex and the City, about how women are earning more than men and pushing ahead." Polydor Records originally intended to release it as a single for The Sound of Girls Aloud: The Greatest Hits (2006) the same year, but was deemed "too downbeat, when a greatest hits single needs to be a celebration." Nicola Roberts, Cheryl Cole, Sarah Harding and Kimberley Walsh recorded vocals for the song in London, England, while Nadine Coyle recorded her vocals in Los Angeles.

== Release ==
An early version of "Call the Shots" leaked online in September 2007. On 16 November 2007, Tangled Up was released, with "Call the Shots" being released for digital download on 26 November 2007, through Polydor Records, while it was also made available on two different CD single formats the same day. The first disc includes a live cover version of Amy Winehouse's 2007 single "Rehab", as performed on the BBC Radio 1 programme Jo Whiley's Live Lounge. The second CD format features an original composition titled "Blow Your Cover", co-written by Girls Aloud with Xenomania. The Tony Lamenza remix of "Call the Shots" was intended for inclusion on the CD single at first; however, the Xenomania club mix was selected instead. The Tony Lamenza remix was included on the Singles Box Set, released in 2009.

== Composition ==
Call the Shots
A 22-second sample of the song, where Girls Aloud sing over the instrumentation. The lyrics are concerned with the ending of a relationship, with the band singing during the chorus, "Just 'cause you're raising the bet and call the shots now on me".

The sheet music to "Call the Shots" is written in the key of D major, setting a moderate tempo of 126 beats per minute. Unlike previous singles released by the band, the song follows the verse–chorus form. The lyrics are concerned with the ending of a relationship, and opens with a repetitive melody followed by Coyle singing, "Static tone on the phone, I'll be breaking again / Must be something better babe". As the chorus begins, the five members of the group trade lines and sing, "Just 'cause you're raising the bet and call the shots now on me / It really doesn't faze me how you spend your time", with Alexis Petridis of The Guardian stating that "only anterograde amnesia could wipe [this part] from your brain". During the middle-eight, Roberts sings lyrics that were the inspiration for Girls Aloud's autobiography Dreams that Glitter – Our Story, released in 2008: "I've seen life burn bright, seen it shimmer / Then fade like starlight to a glimmer, oh no / I've seen life flow by like a river / So full of twilight, dreams that glitter". Alex Fletcher of Digital Spy said that the instrumentation of "Call the Shots" was based on 1990s dance productions, and added that it incorporated "oohs" and "ah ah ahs" that "reverberate around an infectious chorus," while John Lucas of Allmusic wrote that the song showcased a more mature side from Girls Aloud.

== Reception ==
=== Critical response ===
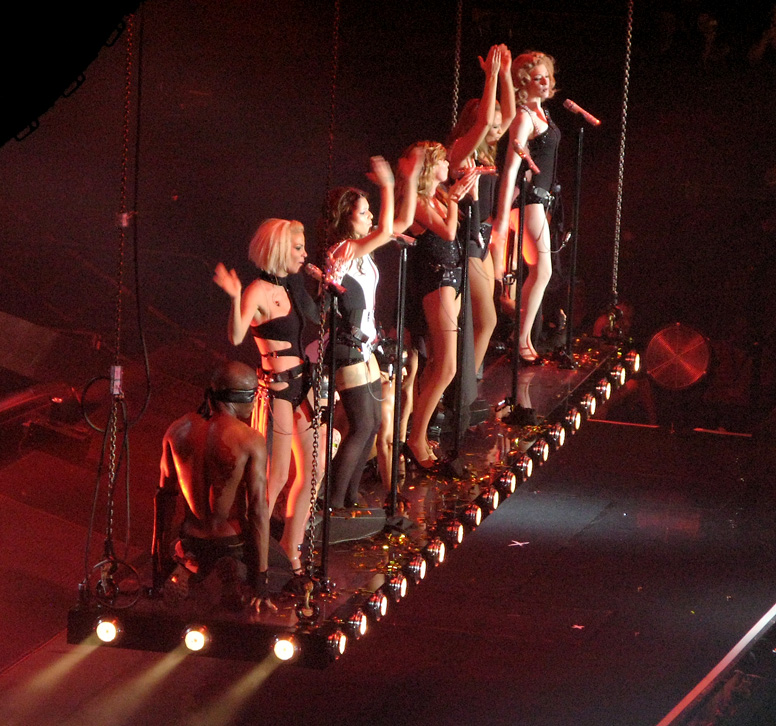
Girls Aloud performing "Call the Shots" on the Out of Control Tour (2009).

Alex Fletcher of Digital Spy rated the song four out of five stars, writing that it is "more tasteful" than few of Girls Aloud's previous releases. Jennie McNulty of Marie Claire said that the song "has a wonderfully ambient feel, echoing an arty electro band", while Alexis Petridis of The Guardian wrote that Tangled Up "begins disappointingly" with "Call the Shots" as the opening track because the song's structure is "a bit commonplace" compared to Girls Aloud's previous singles such as "Biology" (2005). On the countdown of the top singles of 2007, Digital Spy placed "Call the Shots" at number 17, commenting that the band had not lost "their knack for making supremely catchy pop hits." In 2008, the song won the Popjustice £20 Music Prize – Girls Aloud's fourth win. Popjustice writer Peter Robinson deemed it as the "greatest pop song of the 21st century."

=== Chart performance ===
Following the availability of "Call the Shots" due to the release of Tangled Up, the song entered the UK Singles Chart at number nine. The following week, "Call the Shots" rose six places to peak at number three. It managed to stay at number three the following week, but slipped to number five in its fourth week. Through the Christmas week chart, the single managed to stay in the top ten, returning to its debut position of number nine. "Call the Shots" was certified gold by the British Phonographic Industry. On the chart issue of 22 November 2007, the song debuted at number 44 in Ireland, reaching a new peak at number 9 the following week. It attained the same peak on the European Hot 100 Singles chart. Following Sarah Harding's death in September 2021, the song had a resurgence in popularity with streams and sales increasing by 333%.

== Music video ==
The accompanying music video for "Call the Shots" was directed by Sean de Sparengo and filmed in October 2007. The video features the girls in purple dresses performing on Malibu Beach at night with flames and white fabric surrounding them. The girls are also shown in different locations with individual story lines. Cole is seen looking out of a sunny window after an argument with her boyfriend. Walsh is sat in front of a mirror, putting on make-up; her boyfriend comes to get her and they hug, though she appears to be sad. Coyle is seated on a couch, flipping through photographs featuring her and a man. She takes a lighter to the photos and sets them alight. Roberts is lying down by a swimming pool, running her fingers through the water. A young man walks up to her with a bouquet of flowers and tosses them into the water. Harding watches her boyfriend (Adam Karst) in the shower and goes through his phone. The video premiered on 17 October 2007.

The music video showcased the Samsung SGH-F210 Purple, which Girls Aloud promoted in partnership with Phones4U as part of an advertising campaign at the time.

== Live performances and covers ==
Girls Aloud first performed "Call the Shots" at a charity ball in aid of children's charity UNICEF on 10 November 2007. The band also performed the song on The X Factor on 17 November 2007, on The Paul O'Grady Show on 21 November 2007, on This Morning on 27 November 2007, and on Top of the Pops on 25 December 2007. "Call the Shots" was performed on 2008's Tangled Up Tour, and, later that year, at The Girls Aloud Party TV special held by ITV1, and at the V Festival. For 2009's Out of Control Tour, the band began the performance on a smaller, specially-constructed stage in the centre of the arena, and flew back to the main stage before it ended. The same year, Bloc Party covered the song for BBC Radio 1's Live Lounge. In 2013, the song was performed during the second act of the Ten: The Hits Tour. "Call the Shots" was also covered by several artists and bands such as Coldplay, David Jordan, Fyfe Dangerfield, Malcolm Middleton, and Mark Morriss.

== Formats and track listings ==
- CD single – Part 1
1. "Call the Shots" – 3:44
2. "Rehab" (Live Lounge cover) (Winehouse) – 3:42
- CD single – Part 2 and Digital download
1. "Call the Shots" – 3:44
2. "Call the Shots" (Xenomania club mix) – 4:50
3. "Blow Your Cover" (Girls Aloud, Cooper, Higgins, Jody Lei, Xenomania) – 3:27
4. "Call the Shots" (video) – 3:43
- The Singles Boxset
1. "Call the Shots" – 3:44
2. "Rehab" (Live Lounge cover) – 3:42
3. "Call the Shots" (Xenomania club mix) – 4:50
4. "Blow Your Cover" – 3:27
5. "Call the Shots" (Tony Lamezma's Sniper mix) – 7:22
6. "Call the Shots" (Tony Lamezma's radio edit) – 3:29
7. "Call the Shots" (video) – 3:43

Digital EP

1. "Call The Shots" – 3:44
2. "Rehab" – 3:42
3. "Call the Shots" (Xenomania club mix) – 4:46
4. "Blow Your Cover" – 3:27
5. "Call the Shots" (Tony Lamezma's Sniper mix) – 7:21
6. "Call the Shots" (radio edit) – 3:29

== Credits and personnel ==
Credits are adapted from the liner notes of Tangled Up.

- Guitar – Nick Coler, Owen Parker
- Keyboard – Miranda Cooper, Brian Higgins, Matt Gray, Tim Powell, Toby Scott
- Mastering – Dick Beetham for 360 Mastering
- Mixing – Jeremy Wheatley
- Production – Brian Higgins, Xenomania
- Programming – Miranda Cooper, Brian Higgins, Matt Gray, Tim Powell, Toby Scott
- Songwriting – Miranda Cooper, Brian Higgins, Tim Powell, Lisa Cowling, Giselle Somerville
- Vocals – Girls Aloud
- Published by Warner/Chappell Music and Xenomania Music

== Charts ==
=== Weekly charts ===
Weekly chart performance for "Call the Shots"
Chart (2007–2008)	Peak position
Europe (Eurochart Hot 100)	9
Ireland (IRMA)	9
Romania (Romanian Top 100)	38
Russia Airplay (TopHit)	87
Scotland Singles (OCC)	4
UK Singles (OCC)	3
UK Airplay (Music Week)	2

=== Year-end charts ===
Year-end chart performance for "Call the Shots"
Chart (2007)	Position
UK Singles (OCC)	59
Chart (2008)	Position
Europe (Eurochart Hot 100)	95
UK Singles (OCC)	84

== Certifications ==
Certifications and sales for "Call the Shots"
Region	Certification	Certified units/sales
United Kingdom (BPI)	Gold	520,000

== Release history ==
Release dates and formats for "Call the Shots"
Region	Date	Format(s)	Label	Ref(s).
Ireland	26 November 2007	Digital download	Polydor	
United Kingdom	26 November 2007	CD single; digital download	Polydor	
