= Something Kinda Ooooh =

2006 single by Girls Aloud

Single by Girls Aloud

from the album The Sound of Girls Aloud: The Greatest Hits
- B-side: "The Crazy Life"; "Models"
- Released: 23 October 2006
- Genre: Alternative dance; house-pop; Hi-NRG; diva house
- Length: 3:23
- Label: Fascination
- Songwriters: Miranda Cooper; Brian Higgins; Tim Powell; Nick Coler; Giselle Sommerville; Jody Leigh
- Producers: Brian Higgins; Xenomania

Girls Aloud singles chronology
"Whole Lotta History" (2006)	"Something Kinda Ooooh" (2006)	"I Think We're Alone Now" (2006)

Audio sample
- file; help

Music video
- "Something Kinda Ooooh" on YouTube

"Something Kinda Ooooh" is a song by British-Irish all-female pop group Girls Aloud, taken from their first greatest hits collection The Sound of Girls Aloud: The Greatest Hits (2006). The song was written by Miranda Cooper, Brian Higgins and his production team Xenomania, and produced by Higgins and Xenomania. Inspired by 1980s pop and George Michael, "Something Kinda Ooooh" was released as a single in October 2006. It returned Girls Aloud to the top three of the UK Singles Chart for the first time in two years. It also made Girls Aloud the first British act to debut in the top five on the chart based on legal download sales alone.

The music video shows Girls Aloud driving sports cars. The group admitted that the video was not their best, due to time restraints. "Something Kinda Ooooh" was promoted through numerous live appearances and has since been performed on each one of Girls Aloud's subsequent concert tours. Described as "a welcome return to a tune which gets you moving", the song received praise from contemporary music critics.

== Background and composition ==
"Something Kinda Ooooh" is an uptempo alternative dance song, written and recorded to launch Girls Aloud's greatest hits compilation The Sound of Girls Aloud. Upon Xenomania's first attempt at creating a single, they came up with "Dog Without a Bone", which would later become the b-side to "Sexy! No No No...". On the second attempt, they aimed to make a song influenced by the 1980s and George Michael's "Too Funky", with "Something Kinda Ooooh" being created. The song went back and forth between Xenomania and their band several times before being finalised. A restructure of the song placed Cheryl Cole's "I've got to heat it up" verse in the introduction as well as the middle 8, while the third attempt of creating a single turned "Something Kinda Ooooh" into a full-on dance track.

== Release ==
On 4 October 2006, "Something Kinda Ooooh" became the first Girls Aloud single since "Sound of the Underground" to go onto Radio 1's A List, guaranteeing the song at least 20 plays a week.

The single was released as a digital download on 16 October 2006, and on physical formats a week later on 23 October 2006. It was available on two CD single formats. The first disc included "The Crazy Life", co-written by Girls Aloud and sung solely by Kimberley Walsh. The second CD format included "Models" from the Chemistry album, following its use as the theme to the television series Girls Aloud: Off the Record. The version featured has a slightly edited intro and censors the word "shit" in the second verse. The second disc also includes the Tony Lamezma Remix of "Something Kinda Ooooh" and a greatest hits megamix by Jewels & Stone. A number of remixes were made available digitally. The Tube City Remix of the song appears on 2007's Mixed Up. A live recording of "Something Kinda Ooooh" appears on 2007's "Sexy! No No No..." and on 2008's Girls A Live.

The song was featured on the soundtrack to the film Run, Fat Boy, Run, while the UCA used the song heavily in their 2009 cheer camp series. It was the music for the "Extreme Routine", the most difficult challenge the cheerleaders face at camp. The song was also performed in a televised audition for the 9th season of American Idol. "Something Kinda Ooooh" was played during the obsequies of German goalkeeper Robert Enke. It was also the theme song for professional wrestler Jetta, and has also occasionally been used by her tag team partner Rain. "Something Kinda Ooooh" can be heard in the third episode of series one of BBC's Miranda. The song is also heard in the second episode of series two of E4's The Inbetweeners. In 2024, the song was used in an advert for Radox shower gel.

== Reception ==
=== Critical response ===
"Something Kinda Ooooh" was referred to as "another head-spinningly innovative number from the Xenomania team" that served as "more proof that they [Girls Aloud] are this country's finest pop act." CBBC Newsround called the song "a welcome return to a tune which gets you moving" (following two ballads, "See the Day" and "Whole Lotta History"). The review continued that "the girls are still at the top of their game."

Peter Robinson of music website Popjustice described the song as "a breakneck romp through three albums' worth of game-changing, era-defining, genre-redefining pop music." "Something Kinda Ooooh" was nominated for the Popjustice £20 Music Prize in 2007, an annual prize awarded by a panel of judges organised by Popjustice to the singer(s) of the best British pop single of the past year. Girls Aloud had previously won the award for "No Good Advice", "Wake Me Up", and "Biology", but only came fourth with "Something Kinda Ooooh".

=== Chart performance ===
Following the single's release as a digital download, "Something Kinda Ooooh" entered the official UK Singles Chart at number five. They became the first British act to chart in the top five on legal download sales. The following week, "Something Kinda Ooooh" reached its peak of number three. The single stayed at number three for a second week, while Girls Aloud's greatest hits collection topped the albums chart. It fell to number seven the next week. After falling to number twelve in its fifth week, "Something Kinda Ooooh" rose three places to reenter the top ten at number nine. Overall, the single spent fifteen weeks in the UK's top 75. It was the 36th biggest selling single in the UK in the whole of 2006. "Something Kinda Ooooh" also peaked at number three on the UK Download Chart.

The song charted at number seven on the Irish Singles Chart and number eleven on the Billboard European Hot 100 Singles chart.

== Music video ==
The music video for "Something Kinda Ooooh" was directed by Stuart Gosling. It was filmed on 12 September 2006 and premiered on UK music TV station The Box on 21 September 2006. However, The Box had actually shown an early edit of the video, and the finished version was shown on Channel 4's Popworld on 30 September 2006. It features the girls "driving" sports cars in front of a green screen showing the streets of London. Cheryl Cole has a car to herself, Nadine Coyle shares with Kimberley Walsh, and Nicola Roberts shares with Sarah Harding. The featured sports cars of the video are a red TVR Tuscan 2 convertible, blue TVR Tamora and green Lotus Elise. The group also perform a dance routine in front of flashing strobelights.

In an interview with MTV Hits, Cole admitted that "Something Kinda Ooooh" was not their best video. She, along with the rest of the girls, blamed lack of time for the video's outcome and revealed that the video was not what she or the girls had wanted it to be.

The video can be found on the enhanced section of the "Something Kinda Ooooh" CD single, as well as Girls Aloud's 2007 DVD release Style.

== Live performances ==
"Something Kinda Ooooh" was notably Girls Aloud's first single release following the cancellation of music-oriented television programmes like CD:UK, Top of the Pops, and Top of the Pops Reloaded. The group performed "Something Kinda Ooooh" live for the first time on Ant and Dec's Saturday Night Takeaway. The song was also performed on T4's Popworld, The Album Chart Show, the Children in Need 2006 telethon, and Top of the Pop's Christmas special, as well as at the Harrods Christmas parade. They performed the song at a number of live events and open-air concerts, such as G-A-Y, Sketch, T4 on the Beach (2007), and V Festival (2008). Girls Aloud performed a downtempo version with an acoustic arrangement at an intimate gig for Birmingham's leading radio station, BRMB. A recording of the performance was later made available on Girls A Live, a limited edition live album released through Woolworths. They performed the song in black tutus for ITV1's The Girls Aloud Party (2008). In 2012, it was performed at Capital FM's Jingle Bell Ball to promote Girls Aloud's second greatest hits album Ten.

The song has been performed at all of Girls Aloud's concert tours since its release. It served as the opening number of 2007's The Greatest Hits Tour. Girls Aloud descended onto the stage on a large platform. For 2008's Tangled Up Tour, the song served as the encore. Girls Aloud were "untangled" and then performed the song in neon swimwear and legwarmers, while confetti fell. The song was also included on 2009's Out of Control Tour and featured as a part of Girls Aloud's set opening for Coldplay at Wembley Stadium.

== Formats and track listings ==
These are the formats and track listings of major single releases of "Something Kinda Ooooh".

UK CD1 (Fascination / 1709880)

1. "Something Kinda Ooooh" – 3:23
2. "The Crazy Life" (Girls Aloud, Higgins, Coler) – 3:19

UK CD2 (Fascination / 1709889)

1. "Something Kinda Ooooh" – 3:23
2. "Something Kinda Ooooh" (Tony Lamezma Remix) – 5:42
3. "Models" (Theme from Off the Record) (Cooper, Higgins, Powell, Coler, Lisa Cowling, Myra Boyle) – 3:27
4. "The Sound of Girls Aloud Megamix" – 6:24
5. "Something Kinda Ooooh" (video) – 3:13
6. "Something Kinda Ooooh" (karaoke video) – 3:13

The Singles Boxset (CD13)

1. "Something Kinda Ooooh" – 3:23
2. "The Crazy Life" – 3:19
3. "Something Kinda Ooooh" (Tony Lamezma Remix) – 3:23
4. "Models" (Theme from Off the Record) – 3:27
5. "The Sound of Girls Aloud Megamix" – 6:24
6. "Something Kinda Ooooh" (Co-Stars Remix) – 5:43
7. "Something Kinda Ooooh" (Tube City Remix) – 5:29
8. "Something Kinda Ooooh" (Free ZR Remix) – 6:02
9. "Something Kinda Ooooh" (Flip & Fill Remix) – 5:52
10. "Something Kinda Ooooh" (video) – 3:13
11. "Something Kinda Ooooh" (karaoke video) – 3:13

Digital EP

1. "Something Kinda Ooooh" – 3:20
2. "The Crazy Life" – 3:18
3. "Something Kinda Ooooh" (Tony Lamezma mix) – 5:39
4. "Models" – 3:27
5. "Girls Aloud Megamix" – 6:26
6. "Something Kinda Ooooh" (Co-Stars Remix) – 5:42
7. "Something Kinda Ooooh" (Tube City Remix) – 5:27
8. "Something Kinda Ooooh" (Free ZR Remix) – 5:59
9. "Something Kinda Ooooh" (Flip & Fill Remix) – 5:52

== Credits and personnel ==
- Guitar: Nick Coler
- Keyboards: Brian Higgins, Tim Powell, Nick Coler
- Mastering: Dick Beetham for 360 Mastering
- Mixing: Brian Higgins, Tim Powell
- Production: Brian Higgins, Xenomania
- Programming: Brian Higgins, Tim Powell, Eliza Dodd-Noble
- Songwriting: Miranda Cooper, Brian Higgins, Tim Powell, Nick Coler, Giselle Sommerville, Jody Leigh
- Vocals: Girls Aloud
- Published by Warner/Chappell Music and Xenomania Music

== Charts ==
=== Weekly charts ===
Chart (2006–2013)	Peak position
El Salvador (EFE)	2
Europe (Eurochart Hot 100)	11
Ireland (IRMA)	7
Romania (Romanian Top 100)	95
Russia Airplay (TopHit)	60
Scotland Singles (OCC)	2
Slovakia (Rádio Top 100)	40
UK Singles (OCC)	3
UK Airplay (Music Week)	19

=== Year-end chart ===
Chart (2006)	Position
UK Singles (OCC)	36

2013 year-end chart performance for "Something Kinda Ooooh"
Chart (2013)	Position
Ukraine Airplay (TopHit)	197

== Certifications ==
Region	Certification	Certified units/sales
United Kingdom (BPI)	Gold	400,000^{‡}
^{‡} Sales+streaming figures based on certification alone.

== Cover versions ==
The song has been covered by London-based band WARGASM for Amazon Music, as well as South African girl band Shine4 for their 2007 album So Elektries, reworked in Afrikaans as ''Ietsie Binne My''.
