= Can't Speak French =

2008 single by Girls Aloud

Single by Girls Aloud

from the album Tangled Up
- B-side: "Hoxton Heroes"; "Je Ne Parle Pas Français"; "With Every Heartbeat" (Live Lounge cover)
- Released: 14 March 2008
- Recorded: 2007
- Studio: London, England and Los Angeles, California
- Genre: Pop; smooth jazz; soul
- Length: 4:04 (album version); 3:19 (radio edit)
- Label: Fascination
- Songwriters: Miranda Cooper; Brian Higgins; Tim Powell; Nick Coler; Jody Lei; Carla Marie Williams
- Producers: Brian Higgins; Xenomania

Girls Aloud singles chronology
"Call the Shots" (2007)	"Can't Speak French" (2008)	"The Promise" (2008)

"Can't Speak French" is a song performed by British-Irish all-female pop group Girls Aloud, taken from their fourth studio album and serving as the third and final single from the album Tangled Up (2007). The song was written by Miranda Cooper, Brian Higgins and his production team Xenomania, and produced by Higgins and Xenomania. Described as "a swirling, slower cut with great jazzy guitar changes," Higgins said it was "the easiest Girls Aloud single they made." Upon its release in March 2008, "Can't Speak French" charted within the top ten on the UK Singles Chart, continuing their five-year streak of top ten hits.

The music video sees Girls Aloud seduce guests at a dinner party in elaborate costumes inspired by Marie Antoinette and 18th century French fashions. "Can't Speak French" was promoted through numerous live appearances and has since been performed on all of Girls Aloud's subsequent tours. The "sultry" song received praise from most contemporary musics, cited as an example of Xenomania's creativity.

== Background and composition ==
"Can't Speak French" is a mid-tempo pop song with a number of influences. It juxtaposes jazz guitar and a swing beat against a 1980s-inspired synthesiser. The lyrics "find[s] the girls at their glummest, desperately trying to impress a guy who turns their "dust to gold" but doesn't realise it." Producer Brian Higgins said it was "perhaps the easiest Girls Aloud single they made." The song begins with a verse (sung by Nadine Coyle and Kimberley Walsh), a bridge (sung by Coyle, Sarah Harding and Nicola Roberts), and a chorus. It then leads to a middle 8 sung by Cheryl Cole and an instrumental section before repeating the chorus. "Can't Speak French" was slightly remixed by Jeremy Wheatley for single release.

== Release ==
"Can't Speak French" was one of many options for a third single; others included "Close to Love", "Girl Overboard", and "Control of the Knife". The single was confirmed on 15 January 2008 on the official site. Promotion for "Can't Speak French" was initially put on hold, so that Cheryl could sort through her marital problems with Chelsea and England player Ashley Cole, but later resumed. Their new ITV2 television series, Passions of Girls Aloud, also premiered on 14 March, with the Passions Mix of "Can't Speak French" being used as the programme's theme.

The single was released as a digital download on 14 March 2008 and on two CD single formats on 17 March 2008. The first disc included a previously unreleased track entitled "Hoxton Heroes", which was co-written by Girls Aloud and the majority of the vocals being provided by Cheryl Cole. The second disc included the French version of the track, "Je Ne Parle Pas Français", as well as an acoustic cover of Robyn's "With Every Heartbeat" from the BBC Radio 1 programme Live Lounge and the Tony Lamezma Passions Mix. A shortened radio edit of the Tony Lamezma remix was released as a digital exclusive.

Three cover arts were made available on its release. The UKCD1 Cover Art is the one shown up on the infobox for this page, while the other two, the UKCD2 and the Digital EP covers feature different shots from the single's photoshoot

Girls Aloud also held a competition on their official website for a signed poster. Fans submitted their own original verse for "Can't Speak French", with five winners being announced throughout the week of the single's release.

=== B-side ===
The single's B-side "Hoxton Heroes" was first mentioned in a November interview with The Guardian. Miranda Cooper, a songwriter and member of the Xenomania production house, said "We've written a song called Hoxton Hero[es]. Me and the girls got on an amazing rant, taking the piss out of the whole indie scene." Kimberley Walsh stated, "They say we're a manufactured band, but they're just as manufactured." The song was considered too controversial to go on the album. However, Nicola Roberts said the song "wasn't aggressive enough."

On 31 January 2008, it was confirmed on Girls Aloud's official website that "Hoxton Heroes" would appear as a B-side, alongside a French version of the single. A 30-second clip of "Hoxton Heroes" was posted on Girls Aloud's official Myspace on 6 February. Some indie music fans have attacked Girls Aloud for the song. Heatworld.com exclusively streamed a clip of "Je Ne Parle Pas Français" on 26 February.

In 2012, Girls Aloud fans selected "Hoxton Heroes" to be one of ten songs included on the deluxe edition bonus disc of their greatest hits collection Ten.

== Reception ==
=== Critical response ===
The song received mostly positive reviews from critics. On a positive note, The Guardian called the song "a prime example of Xenomania's ability to throw wildly disparate musical elements together." According to AllMusic, the song "achieves the kind of effortlessly sultry cool which the Sugababes have spent a career striving for." Talia Kraines of BBC Music also called the song "sultry" and described it as "mid-tempo fun." John Murphy of musicOMH relentlessly praised the song: "The tempo is taken down a slight notch, a swing beat kicks in backed by some squelchy synths, and there's yet another chorus that stays in your head forever, aided by the gloriously silly lyric of "I can't speak French, so I'll let the funky music do the talking". It's possibly the best thing they've ever done." Another reviewer for musicOMH felt that the "mid-paced groove isn't all that funky," but "creeps up when you're not looking, lodging itself in your head." Less impressed was Sarah Walters of the Manchester Evening News, who stated that she was "undecided whether this is a bad joke or a stroke of genius" and described the chorus as "pure idiocy."

=== Chart performance ===
"Can't Speak French" debuted at number 49 on the UK Singles Chart on 24 February 2008, four weeks before the single's physical release. It rose to number 35 the following week, before entering the top twenty in its third week and climbing to number sixteen in its fourth week on the chart. After the CD formats and digital bundles were released, the song peaked at number nine on the UK Singles chart, and number 3 on the Official Physical Singles Chart, becoming the band's eighteenth consecutive top ten single. On the Official Singles Downloads Chart, it peaked at number 13 the same week it peaked on the UK singles chart. Overall, the single spent ten weeks in the UK's top forty and a total of twenty-five weeks in the UK's top 75. Digital sales also helped the song debut on the Irish Singles Chart at number thirty-five. It rose two spots the following week, and three more to number thirty the week after. Two weeks later, it climbed to number thirteen. Despite falling to number fifteen, it rebounded and achieved a new peak of number twelve.

== Music video ==
Girls Aloud in the music video with their elaborate costumes inspired by Marie Antoinette and 18th century French fashions.

The official music video for "Can't Speak French" was shot towards the end of January 2008 in London. American director Petro directed the music video for the production company Draw Pictures. It premièred on Yahoo! Music on 14 February, with the TV premiere on Channel 4's "Freshly Squeezed" on 16 February. However, the music video appeared on some music channels such as The Box on 13 February.

The music video features Girls Aloud in elaborate costumes inspired by Marie Antoinette and 18th century French fashions. They crash a sophisticated dinner party and seduce the male guests. They dance provocatively and flirt with the men. Throughout the video, individual shots of each girl in front of a coloured wall are interpolated. The "Can't Speak French" music video is available on iTunes as well as Girls Aloud's live DVD Tangled Up: Live from The O2 2008.

== Live performances ==
"Can't Speak French" was performed live for the first time at BRMB's Live at the Local event on 31 October 2007. The song's first television performance was on The Friday Night Project Christmas special on 21 December 2007, which was co-hosted by Girls Aloud. During promotion for the single, Girls Aloud appeared on Ant & Dec's Saturday Night Takeaway, BBC Switch's Sound, The Paul O'Grady Show, and T4. The song was performed at a number of live concerts such as a set at London gay nightclub G-A-Y and the 2008 V Festival.

The song was showcased on 2008's Tangled Up Tour, featured in a cabaret-inspired section alongside "Biology" and "Love Machine" while black-and-white video footage of Paris at night was shown on the video screens. For 2009's Out of Control Tour, the song was only included as part of a greatest hits medley.

== Cover versions ==
- Florence and the Machine recorded a cover of the song in 2008.

== Formats and track listings ==
These are the formats and track listings of major single releases of "Can't Speak French".

UK CD1 (Fascination / 1762720)

1. "Can't Speak French" (Jeremy Wheatley Radio Edit) – 3:19
2. "Hoxton Heroes" (Girls Aloud, Cooper, Higgins, Powell, Owen Parker) – 3:00

UK CD2 (Fascination / 1764167)

1. "Can't Speak French" (Jeremy Wheatley Radio Edit) – 3:19
2. "Je Ne Parle Pas Français" (translation by Jérôme Attal) – 3:41
3. "Can't Speak French" (Tony Lamezma's Passions Remix) – 6:11
4. "With Every Heartbeat" (Live Lounge cover) (Robyn, Kleerup) – 3:58
5. "Can't Speak French" (video) – 3:19

iTunes Exclusive digital download

1. "Can't Speak French" (Tony Lamezma Mix Radio Edit) – 4:00
2. "Can't Speak French" (Jeremy Wheatley Radio Edit) – 3:19

The Singles Boxset (CD18)

1. "Can't Speak French" (Jeremy Wheatley Radio Edit) – 3:19
2. "Hoxton Heroes" – 3:00
3. "Je Ne Parle Pas Français" – 3:41
4. "Can't Speak French" (Tony Lamezma's Passions Remix) – 6:11
5. "With Every Heartbeat" (Live Lounge cover) – 3:58
6. "Can't Speak French" (Tony Lamezma Mix Radio Edit) – 4:00
7. "Can't Speak French" (video) – 3:19

Digital EP

1. "Can't Speak French" (radio edit) – 3:19
2. "Hoxton Heroes" – 3:00
3. "Je Ne Parle Pas Français" – 3:40
4. "Can't Speak French" (Passions remix) – 6:06
5. "With Every Heartbeat" (Radio One Live Lounge) – 3:59
6. "Can't Speak French" (Tony Lamezma Mix radio edit) – 4:00

== Credits and personnel ==
- Guitar: Nick Coler
- Keyboards: Miranda Cooper, Brian Higgins, Tim Powell, Nick Coler
- Mastering: Dick Beetham for 360 Mastering
- Mixing: Jeremy Wheatley, Richard Edgeler (assistant)
- Production: Brian Higgins, Xenomania, Jeremy Wheatley (additional)
- Programming: Brio Taliaferro
- Songwriting: Miranda Cooper, Brian Higgins, Tim Powell, Jody Lei, Carla Marie Williams
- Vocals: Girls Aloud
- Published by Warner/Chappell Music and Xenomania Music

== Charts ==
=== Weekly charts ===
Weekly chart performance for "Can't Speak French"
Chart (2008)	Peak position
European Hot 100 Singles (Billboard)	33
Ireland (IRMA)	12
Scottish Singles Sales (Official Charts)	3
UK Singles (Official Charts)	9
UK Airplay (Music Week)	5

=== Year-end charts ===
Year-end chart performance for "Can't Speak French"
Chart (2008)	Position
UK Singles (OCC)	69
