= Peter Robinson (journalist) =

British music journalist

Peter Robinson is a British music journalist. He is the creator of the pop music-based blog Popjustice. Robinson self-published the biography/fanzine of The KLF, Justified and Ancient History. He is also the author of three books: The Official Story and On Tour for UK pop band Busted, and also the author of the tie-in book to UK reality TV show Popstars: The Rivals.

== See also ==
- Wonky pop
