= Popjustice =

British music website

- Website type: Music blog, online forum
- Available in: English
- Dissolved: 26 April 2026
- Owner: Peter Robinson (editor)
- Creators: Peter Robinson, various
- Website: www.popjustice.com
- Commercial: Yes
- Registration: Forum required
- Launched: 2000

Popjustice was a music website founded in 2000 by UK freelance music journalist Peter Robinson, who had worked for NME, The Guardian, Attitude and many others. It was composed of the work of editor Robinson, features editor Michael Cragg, and a host of contributors.

The website sought to celebrate commercial popular music and did this using humour, user interaction, and contacts within the music industry. Its writing style was compared favourably by a number of critics to that of the now defunct Smash Hits magazine, in that it mixed a passion for pop music with a surreal and biting wit.

The website was relaunched in January 2006 with more features, music downloads and online shop. In November 2006 Popjustice won a Record of the Day PR & Music Journalism Award in the Best Online Music Publication category, with another individual award going to Peter Robinson in the Breaking Music: Writer Of The Year category.

After a semi-hiatus since mid-2021 and two posts during 2022, as of 2023, the journalism component of the website migrated to Substack, with the Popjustice forums remaining at the original location.

On 10 April 2026, it was announced that the site's forum would be shutting down on 26 April 2026. The forum closed as planned on 26 April 2026; in the closing message, Popjustice noted that following the closure announcement, forum members had set up a new fan-made forum called Pop Square to continue discussions.

== Popjustice £20 Music Prize ==
In 2003, Popjustice set up the Popjustice £20 Music Prize, in order to find the best British pop single of the year, as a parody of the Mercury Music Prize and held on the same night, usually at a bar in Central London.

Winners of the Popjustice £20 Music Prize
Year	Artist	Song
2003	Girls Aloud	"No Good Advice"
2004	Rachel Stevens	"Some Girls"
2005	Girls Aloud	"Wake Me Up"
2006	Girls Aloud	"Biology"
2007	Amy Winehouse	"Rehab"
2008	Girls Aloud	"Call the Shots"
2009	Girls Aloud	"The Promise"
2010	Example	"Kickstarts"
2011	The Saturdays	"Higher"
2012	Will Young	"Jealousy"
2013	Chvrches	"The Mother We Share"
2014	Little Mix	"Move"
2015	Little Mix	"Black Magic"
2016	Zayn	"Pillowtalk"
2017	Little Mix	"Touch"
2018	Rita Ora	"Anywhere"
2019	Georgia	"About Work the Dancefloor"
2020	Dua Lipa	"Physical"
2021	Laura Mvula	"Got Me"
2022	Harry Styles	"As It Was"
2023	Raye featuring 070 Shake	"Escapism"
2024	Charli xcx and Lorde	"The girl, so confusing version with Lorde"
2025	Jade	"Plastic Box"

== Popjustice books and albums ==
A series of Popjustice books called Popjustice Idols were published in March 2006. They are illustrated by David Whittle. Drawing inspiration from Roger Hargreaves's Mr Men books, these feature amusing looks at the lives of pop stars. The initial titles were Kylie Minogue, Madonna, Robbie Williams and Eminem with a Take That version released in April 2006. Four more were released in November 2006 featuring Pete Doherty, Elton John, Britney Spears and Michael Jackson. A compilation album was also released in October 2006, titled Popjustice: 100% Solid Pop Music.
