= Trudy Bellinger =

British music video director

Trudy Bellinger is a British television director, producer and writer. She is known for her involvement in multiple music video projects.

She directed a short film, Killing Christmas, which won awards at three film festivals. She has also directed promotional campaigns for television programs, including for Project Runway and The Masked Singer.

Since the 1990s, she has worked as a freelance creative consultant for EMI Records, Sony Music, Syco, Universal Music and other record labels.
