= List of UK top-ten singles in 1998 =

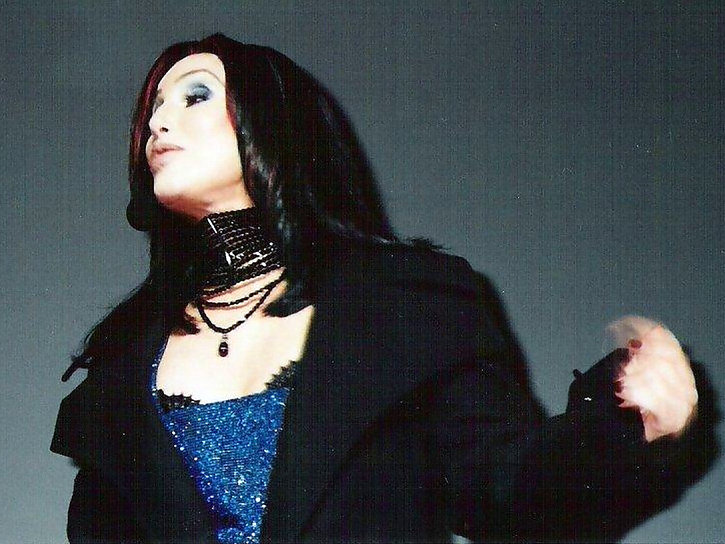
Cher had the best-selling single of 1998, "Believe", which topped the chart for seven weeks. At 52 years and five months old, Cher was, at the time, the oldest living female singer to achieve a solo number-one single in the UK.

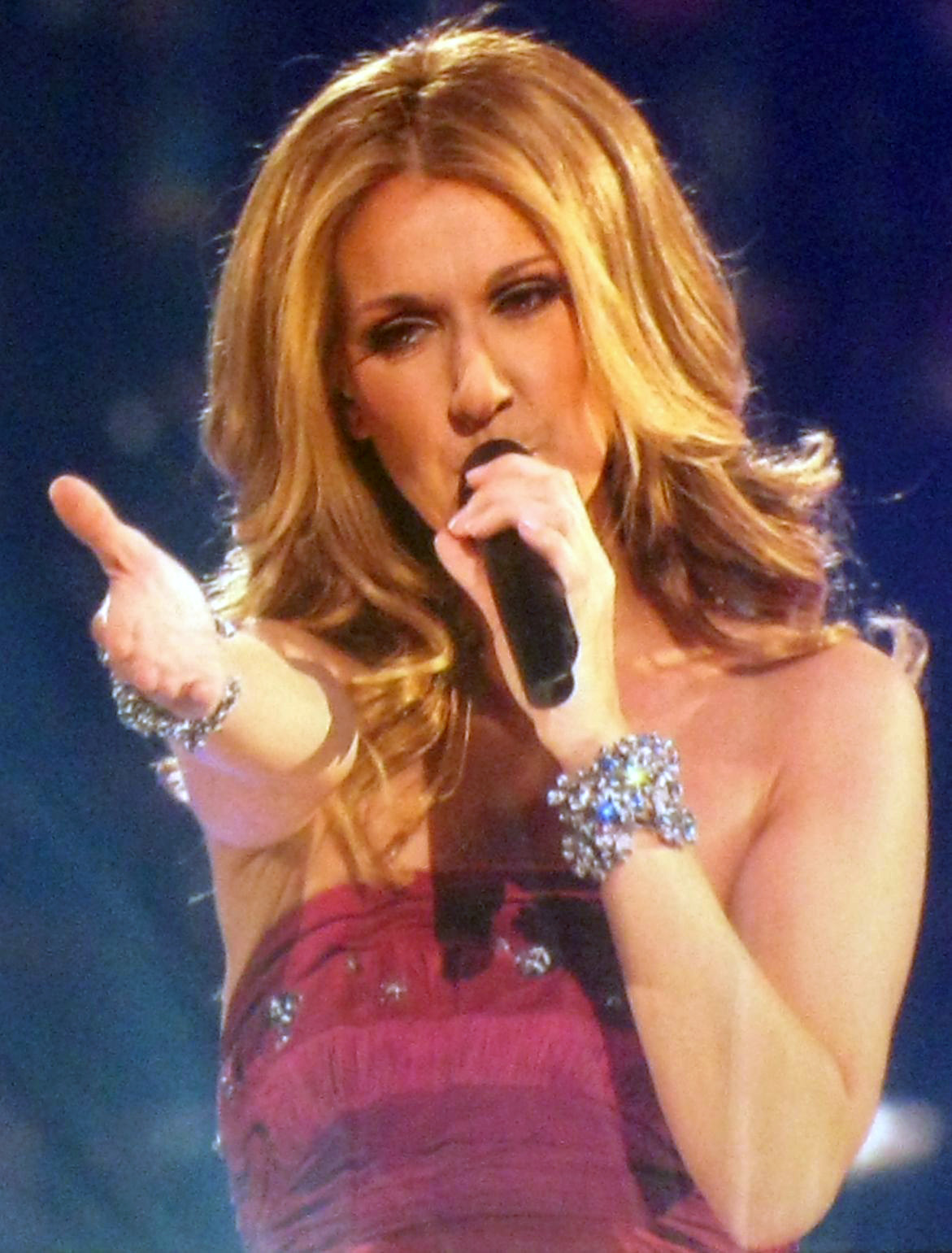
Celine Dion (pictured in 2008) had the second best seller of the year with "My Heart Will Go On". Taken from the soundtrack of the movie Titanic, the record spent a total of 11 weeks in the top 10, with two non-consecutive weeks at number-one. Dion had a total of three singles in the top 10 this year.

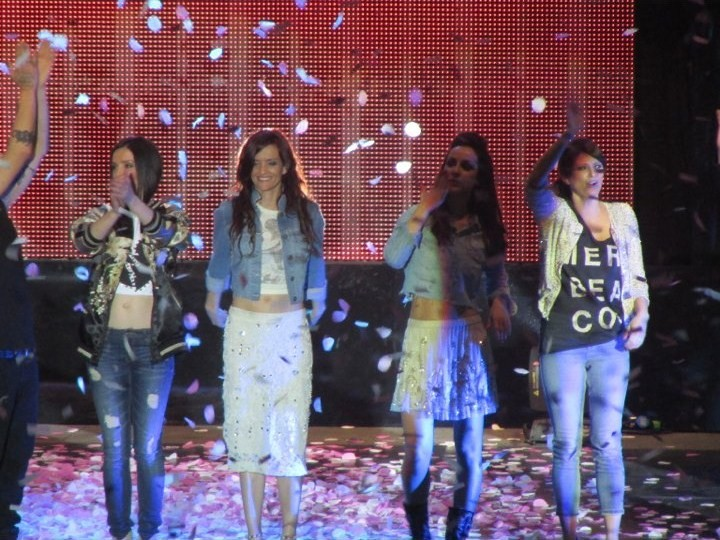
Irish girl group B*Witched (pictured in 2013) made their UK top 10 debut in 1998 by scoring three consecutive number-one singles: "C'est la Vie", "Rollercoaster" and "To You I Belong".

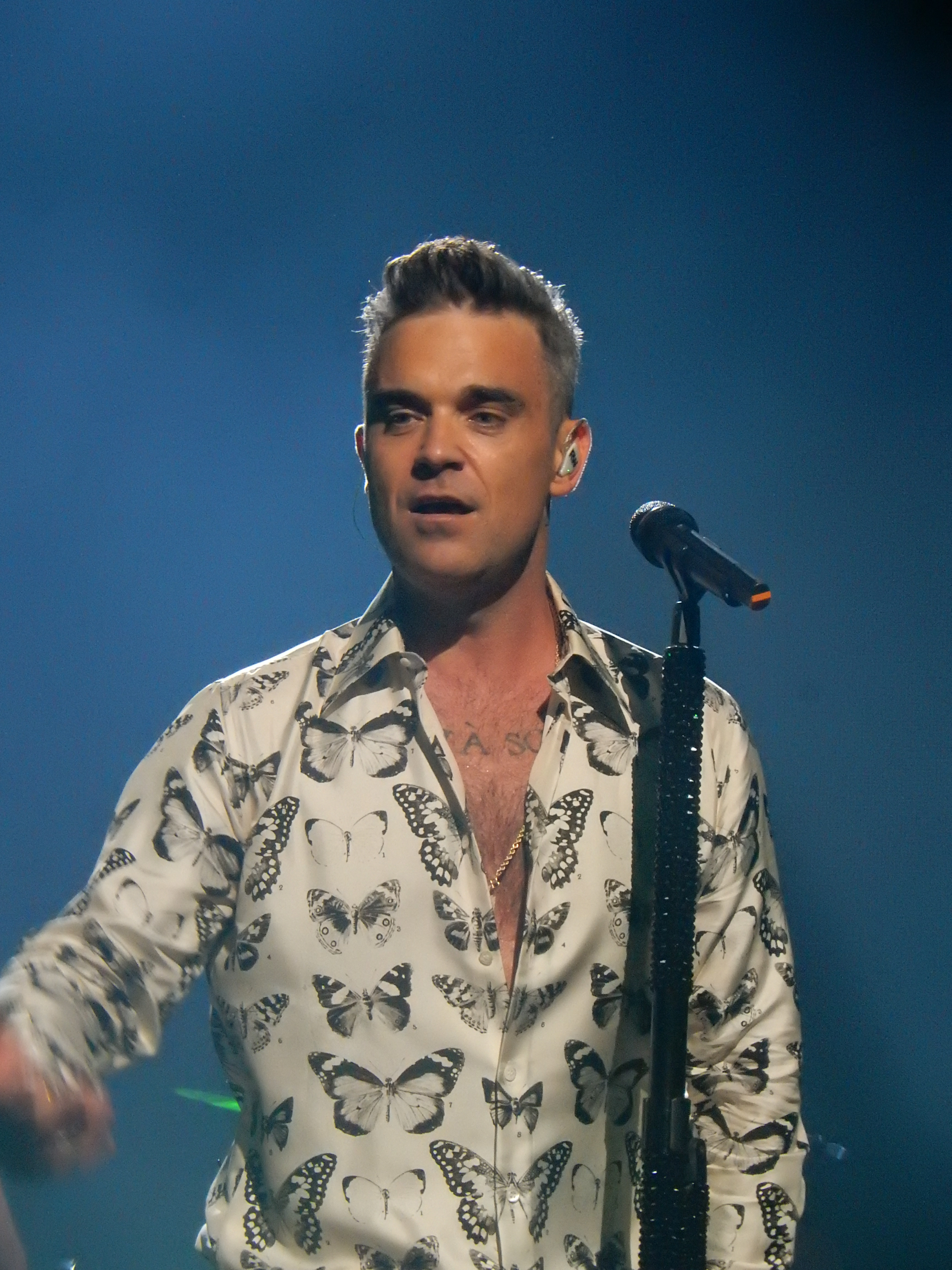
Former Take That singer Robbie Williams (pictured in 2016) scored his first solo UK number-one single in 1998 with "Millennium". It was one of four top 10 hits for the singer this year.

The UK Singles Chart is one of many music charts compiled by the Official Charts Company that calculates the best-selling singles of the week in the United Kingdom. Before 2004, the chart was only based on the sales of physical singles. This list shows singles that peaked in the Top 10 of the UK Singles Chart during 1998, as well as singles which peaked in 1997 and 1999 but were in the top 10 in 1998. The entry date is when the song appeared in the top 10 for the first time (week ending, as published by the Official Charts Company, which is six days after the chart is announced).

One-hundred and ninety-six singles were in the top ten in 1998. Ten singles from 1997 remained in the top 10 for several weeks at the beginning of the year, while "Chocolate Salty Balls (P.S. I Love You)" by Chef and "Heartbeat"/"Tragedy" by Steps were both released in 1998 but did not reach their peak until 1999. "Angels" by Robbie Williams and "Never Ever" by All Saints were the singles from 1997 to reach their peak in 1998. Forty-nine artists scored multiple entries in the top 10 in 1998. Steps, B*Witched, Usher, Destiny's Child, Fatboy Slim, The Corrs, Shania Twain, Missy Elliott and Stereophonics were among the many artists who achieved their first UK charting top 10 single in 1998.

The 1997 Christmas number-one, "Too Much" by Spice Girls, remained at number-one for the first week of 1998. Charity single "Perfect Day" by Various Artists returned to the top spot for an additional week. The first new number-one single of the year was "Never Ever" by All Saints. Overall, thirty-two different singles peaked at number-one in 1998, with All Saints, B*Witched, Boyzone (including the "Perfect Day" charity single) and Mel B (3) having the joint most singles hit that position.

== Background ==
=== Multiple entries ===
One-hundred and ninety-four singles charted in the top 10 in 1998, with one-hundred and eighty-seven singles reaching their peak this year (including the re-entries "Sit Down" and "You're the One That I Want" which charted in previous years but reached peaks on their latest chart run).

Forty-nine artists scored multiple entries in the top 10 in 1998. Two members of Spice Girls - Mel B and Melanie C - shared the record for the most top-ten singles in 1998 with six entries. Five of these singles were with the band, but they also had individual collaborations outside of the band. Mel B reached number one in September with "I Want You Back", which featured American rapper Missy "Missdemeanor" Elliott. Melanie C collaborated with Canadian rock artist Bryan Adams on "When You're Gone", the song peaking at number 3 in December. Three of Spice Girls top ten entries reached number-one: "Too Much" in December 1997, "Viva Forever" in July and "Goodbye" in December 1998. "Stop" peaked at number 2 in March, and they also featured on the England United collective single "(How Does It Feel to Be) On Top of the World" for the FIFA World Cup, which reached number 9.

Seven acts had four singles in the top 10: All Saints, Aqua, Boyzone, Five, Madonna, Robbie Williams and Steps.

Billie was one of a number of artists with three top 10 entries, including the number-one single "Because We Want To". Another Level, Celine Dion, Natalie Imbruglia, Sash! and Will Smith were among the other artists who had multiple top 10 entries in 1998.

=== Chart debuts ===
Eighty-one artists achieved their first top 10 single in 1998, either as a lead or featured artist. Of these, eleven went on to record another hit single that year: Brandy, Catatonia, Eagle-Eye Cherry, Fatboy Slim, Honeyz, Monica, Mýa, Savage Garden, Shania Twain, The Tamperer featuring Maya and Wyclef Jean. Another Level, B*Witched, Cerys Matthews, Cleopatra, The Corrs, Pras Michel and Steps all had two other entries in their breakthrough year.

The following table (collapsed on desktop site) does not include acts who had previously charted as part of a group and secured their first top 10 solo single.

Artist	Number of top 10s	First entry	Chart position	Other entries
Bamboo	1	"Bamboogie"	2	—
Wildchild	1	"Renegade Master '98"	3	—
Usher	1	"You Make Me Wanna..."	1	—
Catatonia	2	"Mulder and Scully"	3	"Road Rage" (5)
Cerys Matthews	3	"Mulder and Scully"	3	"The Ballad of Tom Jones" (4), "Road Rage" (5)
Cleopatra	3	"Cleopatra's Theme"	3	"Life Ain't Easy" (4), "I Want You Back" (4)
Camisra	1	"Let Me Show You"	5	—
Cornershop	1	"Brimful of Asha"	1	—
Savage Garden	2	"Truly Madly Deeply"	4	"To the Moon and Back" (3)
Will Mellor	1	"When I Need You"	5	—
Another Level	3	"Be Alone No More"	6	"Freak Me" (1), "Guess I Was a Fool" (5)
Shania Twain	2	"You're Still the One"	10	"From This Moment On" (9)
LeAnn Rimes	1	"How Do I Live"	7	—
Robyn	1	"Show Me Love"	8	—
Beenie Man	1	"Who Am I"	10	—
Cast from Casualty	1	"Everlasting Love"	5	—
Jason Nevins	1	"It's Like That"	1	—
Wu-Tang Clan	1	"Say What You Want (All Day Every Day)"	4	—
Alexia	1	"Uh La La La"	10	—
Destiny's Child	1	"No, No, No"	5	—
Tin Tin Out	1	"Here's Where the Story Ends"	7	—
Shelley Nelson	1	"Here's Where the Story Ends"	7	—
Billie Myers	1	"Kiss the Rain"	4	—
Daniel O'Donnell	1	"Give a Little Love"	7	—
Ultra	1	"Found a Cure"	6	—
K-Ci & JoJo	1	"All My Life"	8	—
The Tamperer featuring Maya	2	"Feel It"	1	"If You Buy This Record Your Life Will Be Better" (3)
187 Lockdown	1	"Kung-Fu"	9	—
Steps	3	"Last Thing on My Mind"	6	"One for Sorrow" (2), "Heartbeat"/"Tragedy" (1) ^{[A]}
The Mavericks	1	"Dance the Night Away"	4	—
Massive Attack	1	"Teardrop"	10	—
Wyclef Jean	2	"Gone till November"	3	"Another One Bites the Dust" (5)
The Corrs	3	"Dreams"	6	"What Can I Do" (3), "So Young" (6)
Arsenal F.C.	1	"Hot Stuff"	9	—
B*Witched	3	"C'est la Vie"	1	"Rollercoaster" (1), "To You I Belong" (1)
Brandy	2	"The Boy Is Mine"	2	"Top of the World" (2)
Monica	2	"The Boy Is Mine"	2	"The First Night" (6)
Mousse T.	1	"Horny '98"	2	—
Hot 'n' Juicy	1	"Horny '98"	2	—
Bus Stop	1	"Kung Fu Fighting"	8	—
England United	1	"(How Does It Feel to Be) On Top of the World"	9	—
Fat Les	1	"Vindaloo"	2	—
Fatboy Slim	2	"The Rockafeller Skank"	6	"Gangster Trippin" (3)
Des'ree	1	"Life"	8	—
Pras Michel	3	"Ghetto Supastar (That Is What You Are)"	2	"Blue Angels" (6), "Another One Bites the Dust" (5)
ODB	1	"Ghetto Supastar (That Is What You Are)"	2	—
Mýa	2	"Ghetto Supastar (That Is What You Are)"	2	"Take Me There" (7)
Karen Ramirez	1	"Looking for Love"	8	—
Eagle-Eye Cherry	2	"Save Tonight"	6	"Falling in Love Again" (8)
Billie	1	"Because We Want To"	1	"Girlfriend" (1), "She Wants You" (3)
Sparkle"	1	"Be Careful"	7	—
Echobeatz	1	"Mas que Nada"	10	—
Lucid	1	"I Can't Help Myself"	7	—
Tina Cousins	1	"Mysterious Times"	2	—
David Morales presents The Face	1	"Needin' U"	8	—
Stardust	1	"Music Sounds Better with You"	2	—
Sweetbox	1	"Everything's Gonna Be Alright"	5	—
Alda	1	"Real Good Time"	7	—
Honeyz	2	"Finally Found"	4	"End of the Line" (5)
Jennifer Paige	1	"Crush"	4	—
T-Spoon	1	"Sex on the Beach"	2	—
Missy Elliott	1	"I Want You Back"	1	—
Lauryn Hill	1	"Doo Wop (That Thing)"	3	—
Spacedust	1	"Gym and Tonic"	1	—
Dru Hill	1	"How Deep Is Your Love"	9	—
Kele Le Roc	1	"Little Bit of Lovin'"	8	—
Touch and Go	1	"Would You...?"	3	—
Free	1	"Another One Bites the Dust"	5	—
Tatyana Ali	1	"Daydreamin'"	6	—
Stereophonics	1	"The Bartender and the Thief"	3	—
Vengaboys	1	"Up and Down"	4	—
Shannon	1	"Move Mania"	8	—
Ruff Driverz	1	"Dreaming"	10	—
Arrola	1	"Dreaming"	10	—
Vonda Shepard	1	"Searchin' My Soul"	10	—
Emila	1	"Big Big World"	5	—
Blinky Blink	1	"Take Me There"	7	—
Chef	1	"Chocolate Salty Balls (P.S. I Love You)" ^{[B]}	1	—
Denise Van Outen	1	"Especially for You"	3	—
Johnny Vaughan	1	"Especially for You"	3	—
Jane McDonald	1	"Cruise Into Christmas"	10	—

Notes

Ian Brown of The Stone Roses launched a solo career in 1998, reaching number 5 in January with his debut single "My Star". Inaya Day was a featured vocalist on "Horny '98" by Mousse T. vs. Hot 'n' Juicy but is not credited on the Official Charts Company listing. She would have her first official entry in 2006 with "Nasty Girl", reaching number 9. Fat Les was made up of Blur bassist Alex James (who had secured ten top 10 singles up to that point, including number-ones "Beetlebum" and "Country House"), artist Damien Hirst making his chart debut, and Keith Allen, also in the charts for the first time as a singer but he had written "New Order's 1990 single "World in Motion".

Fatboy Slim was responsible for the "Renegade Master '98" remix by Wildchild at the start of the year but he did not make his official top 10 debut until June with "The Rockafeller Skank". Under his real name Norman Cook, he was also part of the line-up of Freak Power, who debuted with 1995's reissue of "Turn On, Tune In, Cop Out". Jimmy Page was a founding member of Led Zeppelin and in 1998 he collaborated with Puff Daddy on his song "Come with Me" which sampled the Zeppelin song "Kashmir". Mel B of Spice Girls had her first solo single alongside "Missy Elliott, reaching the top of the charts with "I Want You Back". Bandmate Melanie C made number 3 with her feature on the Bryan Adams song "When You're Gone".

East 17 returned in 1998 after splitting up in 1997 under the name E-17, which they kept until the following year before breaking up again. Their only top 10 single under this name was the number 2 single "Each Time". Chef is a character from the television series South Park voiced by Isaac Hayes. He had recorded two top 10 singles under his own name - "Theme from Shaft" and "Disco Connection".

=== Songs from films ===
Original songs from various films entered the top 10 throughout the year. These included "My Heart Will Go On" (from Titanic), "Truly Madly Deeply" (Music from Another Room), "Turn Back Time" (Sliding Doors), "Ghetto Supastar (That Is What You Are)" (Bulworth), "Deeper Underground" and "Come with Me" (Godzilla), "You're the One That I Want" (Grease), "Kiss the Girl" (The Little Mermaid), "Lost in Space" (Lost in Space), "I Don't Want to Miss a Thing" (Armageddon), "How Deep Is Your Love" (Rush Hour), "Another One Bites the Dust" (Small Soldiers), "Take Me There" (The Rugrats Movie) and "When You Believe" (The Prince of Egypt). "Antmusic" was recorded for the movie A Bug's Life but was not used in the finished film.

=== Best-selling singles ===
Cher had the best-selling single of the year with "Believe". The song spent twelve weeks in the top 10 (including seven weeks at number one), sold over 1.519 million copies and was certified by the BPI. "My Heart Will Go On" by Celine Dion came in second place, selling more than 1.302 million copies and losing out by around 217,000 sales. Run-D.M.C. vs. Jason Nevins' "It's Like That", "No Matter What" from Boyzone and "C'est la Vie" by B*Witched made up the top five. Singles by LeAnn Rimes, Chef, Spice Girls, Pras Michel featuring ODB & Mýa and Savage Garden were also in the top ten best-selling singles of the year.

"Believe" (5) also ranked in the top 10 best-selling singles of the decade.

== Top-ten singles ==
Symbol	Meaning
‡	Single peaked in 1997 but still in chart in 1998.
♦	Single released in 1998 but peaked in 1999.
(#)	Year-end top-ten single position and rank
Entered	The date that the song first appeared in the chart.
Peak	Highest position that the single reached in the UK Singles Chart.

Entered (week ending)	Weeks in top 10	Single	Artist	Peak	Peak reached (week ending)	Weeks at peak
Singles in 1997
20 September 1997	13	"Something About the Way You Look Tonight"/"Candle in the Wind 1997" ‡ ^{[C]}	Elton John	1	20 September 1997	5
25 October 1997	12	"Barbie Girl" ‡	Aqua	1	1 November 1997	4
8 November 1997	11	"Torn" ‡	Natalie Imbruglia	2	8 November 1997	3
22 November 1997	15	"Never Ever"	All Saints	1	17 January 1998	1
29 November 1997	9	"Perfect Day" ‡ ^{[D]}	Various artists	1	29 November 1997	3
6 December 1997	5	"Baby Can I Hold You"/"Shooting Star" ‡	Boyzone	2	6 December 1997	1
13 December 1997	5	"Teletubbies say 'Eh-oh!'" ‡	Teletubbies	1	13 December 1997	2
13 December 1997	10	"Together Again" ‡	Janet Jackson	4	13 December 1997	2
13 December 1997	12	"Angels"	Robbie Williams	4	21 February 1998	1
27 December 1997	4	"Too Much" ‡	Spice Girls	1	27 December 1997	2
Singles in 1998
10 January 1998	7	"High"	Lighthouse Family	4	31 January 1998	1
10 January 1998	2	"Avenging Angels"	Space	6	10 January 1998	1
17 January 1998	4	"Bamboogie"	Bamboo	2	17 January 1998	1
17 January 1998	3	"Renegade Master '98" ^{[E]}	Wildchild	3	17 January 1998	1
24 January 1998	2	"All Around the World"	Oasis	1	24 January 1998	1
24 January 1998	1	"No Surprises"	Radiohead	4	24 January 1998	1
24 January 1998	1	"My Star"	Ian Brown	5	24 January 1998	1
31 January 1998	3	"You Make Me Wanna..."	Usher	1	31 January 1998	1
31 January 1998	3	"Mulder and Scully"	Catatonia	3	31 January 1998	1
31 January 1998	1	"Amnesia"	Chumbawamba	10	31 January 1998	1
7 February 1998	6	"Doctor Jones"	Aqua	1	7 February 1998	2
7 February 1998	4	"Gettin' Jiggy wit It"	Will Smith	3	7 February 1998	1
7 February 1998	1	"Crazy Little Party Girl"	Aaron Carter	7	7 February 1998	1
14 February 1998	2	"All I Have to Give"	Backstreet Boys	2	14 February 1998	1
14 February 1998	2	"Cleopatra's Theme"	Cleopatra	3	14 February 1998	1
21 February 1998	11	"My Heart Will Go On" (#2)	Celine Dion	1	21 February 1998	2
21 February 1998	1	"Let Me Show You"	Camisra	5	21 February 1998	1
21 February 1998	1	"Solomon Bites the Worm"	The Bluetones	10	21 February 1998	1
28 February 1998	4	"Brimful of Asha" ^{[F]}	Cornershop	1	28 February 1998	1
28 February 1998	11	"Truly Madly Deeply" (#10)	Savage Garden	4	28 February 1998	1
28 February 1998	1	"When I Need You"	Will Mellor	5	28 February 1998	1
28 February 1998	2	"Be Alone No More"	Another Level	6	28 February 1998	1
28 February 1998	1	"You're Still the One"	Shania Twain	10	28 February 1998	1
7 March 1998	4	"Frozen"	Madonna	1	7 March 1998	1
7 March 1998	2	"The Ballad of Tom Jones"	Space with Cerys Matthews	4	7 March 1998	1
7 March 1998	7	"How Do I Live" (#6) ^{[G]}	LeAnn Rimes	7	7 March 1998	2
7 March 1998	1	"Show Me Love"	Robyn	8	7 March 1998	1
7 March 1998	1	"Who Am I"	Beenie Man	10	7 March 1998	1
14 March 1998	2	"Big Mistake"	Natalie Imbruglia	2	14 March 1998	1
14 March 1998	2	"When the Lights Go Out"	Five	4	14 March 1998	1
14 March 1998	1	"Everlasting Love"	Cast from Casualty	5	14 March 1998	1
21 March 1998	8	"It's Like That" (#3)	Run–D.M.C. vs. Jason Nevins	1	21 March 1998	6
21 March 1998	3	"Stop"	Spice Girls	2	21 March 1998	1
21 March 1998	1	"Insane"/"Say What You Want (All Day Every Day)"	Texas/Texas featuring the Wu-Tang Clan	4	21 March 1998	1
21 March 1998	1	"Uh La La La"	Alexia	10	21 March 1998	1
28 March 1998	4	"Let Me Entertain You"	Robbie Williams	3	28 March 1998	1
28 March 1998	2	"No, No, No"	Destiny's Child	5	28 March 1998	1
28 March 1998	3	"Here's Where the Story Ends"	Tin Tin Out featuring Shelley Nelson	7	28 March 1998	1
28 March 1998	1	"Angel St"	M People	8	28 March 1998	1
28 March 1998	1	"Father"	LL Cool J	10	28 March 1998	1
4 April 1998	4	"La Primavera"	Sash!	3	4 April 1998	2
4 April 1998	2	"All I Want Is You"	911	4	4 April 1998	1
4 April 1998	1	"I Get Lonely"	Janet Jackson	5	4 April 1998	1
11 April 1998	3	"Kiss the Rain"	Billie Myers	4	11 April 1998	2
11 April 1998	1	"Give a Little Love"	Daniel O'Donnell	7	11 April 1998	1
18 April 1998	3	"Turn It Up (Remix)/Fire It Up"	Busta Rhymes	2	18 April 1998	2
18 April 1998	2	"Found a Cure"	Ultra Naté	6	18 April 1998	2
18 April 1998	1	"All My Life"	K-Ci & JoJo	8	18 April 1998	1
25 April 1998	8	"Feel It"	The Tamperer featuring Maya	1	30 May 1998	1
25 April 1998	1	"Kung-Fu"	187 Lockdown	9	25 April 1998	1
2 May 1998	2	"All That I Need"	Boyzone	1	2 May 1998	1
2 May 1998	1	"Sound of Drums"	Kula Shaker	3	2 May 1998	1
2 May 1998	1	"Road Rage"	Catatonia	5	2 May 1998	1
2 May 1998	6	"Last Thing on My Mind"	Steps	6	2 May 1998	2
2 May 1998	8	"Dance the Night Away"	The Mavericks	4	30 May 1998	1
9 May 1998	6	"Under the Bridge"/"Lady Marmalade"	All Saints	1	9 May 1998	2
9 May 1998	2	"Ray of Light"	Madonna	2	9 May 1998	1
9 May 1998	1	"Push It"	Garbage	9	9 May 1998	1
9 May 1998	1	"Teardrop"	Massive Attack	10	9 May 1998	1
16 May 1998	3	"Turn Back Time"	Aqua	1	16 May 1998	1
16 May 1998	3	"Gone till November"	Wyclef Jean	3	16 May 1998	1
16 May 1998	3	"Life Ain't Easy"	Cleopatra	4	16 May 1998	1
16 May 1998	3	"Dreams"	The Corrs	6	16 May 1998	1
16 May 1998	1	"Say You Love Me"	Simply Red	7	16 May 1998	1
23 May 1998	4	"Stranded"	Lutricia McNeal	3	30 May 1998	1
23 May 1998	1	"Hot Stuff"	Arsenal F.C.	9	23 May 1998	1
6 June 1998	9	"C'est la Vie" (#5)	B*Witched	1	6 June 1998	2
6 June 1998	6	"The Boy Is Mine" ^{[H]}	Brandy & Monica	2	6 June 1998	1
6 June 1998	6	"Horny '98"	Mousse T. vs. Hot 'N' Juicy	2	13 June 1998	1
6 June 1998	1	"Come Back to What You Know"	Embrace	6	6 June 1998	1
13 June 1998	1	"My All"	Mariah Carey	4	13 June 1998	1
13 June 1998	1	"Kung Fu Fighting"	Bus Stop featuring Carl Douglas	8	13 June 1998	1
13 June 1998	1	"(How Does It Feel to Be) On Top of the World"	England United ^{[I]}	9	13 June 1998	1
20 June 1998	4	"3 Lions '98"	Baddiel, Skinner & The Lightning Seeds	1	20 June 1998	3
20 June 1998	4	"Vindaloo"	Fat Les	2	20 June 1998	3
20 June 1998	3	"Got the Feelin'"	Five	3	20 June 1998	1
20 June 1998	2	"Carnaval de Paris"	Dario G	5	20 June 1998	1
20 June 1998	1	"The Rockafeller Skank"	Fatboy Slim	6	20 June 1998	1
20 June 1998	1	"Life"	Des'ree	8	20 June 1998	1
27 June 1998	10	"Ghetto Supastar (That Is What You Are)" (#9)	Pras Michel featuring ODB & Mýa	2	11 July 1998	2
27 June 1998	1	"Lost in Space"	Lighthouse Family	6	27 June 1998	1
27 June 1998	4	"Looking for Love"	Karen Ramirez	8	11 July 1998	1
4 July 1998	1	"Intergalactic"	Beastie Boys	5	4 July 1998	1
4 July 1998	6	"Save Tonight"	Eagle-Eye Cherry	6	4 July 1998	3
4 July 1998	1	"How Do You Want Me to Love You?"	911	10	4 July 1998	1
11 July 1998	4	"Because We Want To"	Billie	1	11 July 1998	1
11 July 1998	1	"Eight (EP)"	Mansun	7	11 July 1998	1
18 July 1998	5	"Freak Me"	Another Level	1	18 July 1998	1
18 July 1998	1	"Immortality"	Celine Dion with Bee Gees	5	18 July 1998	1
18 July 1998	1	"Be Careful"	Sparkle featuring R. Kelly	7	18 July 1998	1
18 July 1998	1	"I Think I'm Paranoid"	Garbage	9	18 July 1998	1
25 July 1998	3	"Deeper Underground"	Jamiroquai	1	25 July 1998	1
25 July 1998	1	"You're the One That I Want" ^{[J]}	John Travolta & Olivia Newton-John	4	25 July 1998	1
25 July 1998	4	"Life Is a Flower"	Ace of Base	5	25 July 1998	2
25 July 1998	1	"Kiss the Girl"	Peter Andre	9	25 July 1998	1
25 July 1998	1	"Mas que Nada"	Echobeatz	10	25 July 1998	1
1 August 1998	5	"Viva Forever"	Spice Girls	1	1 August 1998	2
1 August 1998	2	"Just the Two of Us"	Will Smith	2	1 August 1998	1
1 August 1998	1	"My Oh My"	Aqua	6	1 August 1998	1
8 August 1998	3	"Come with Me"	Puff Daddy featuring Jimmy Page	2	8 August 1998	1
8 August 1998	2	"Lost in Space"	Apollo 440	4	8 August 1998	1
8 August 1998	1	"I Can't Help Myself"	Lucid	7	8 August 1998	1
15 August 1998	8	"No Matter What" (#4)	Boyzone	1	15 August 1998	3
15 August 1998	3	"Mysterious Times"	Sash! featuring Tina Cousins	2	15 August 1998	1
15 August 1998	1	"Pure Morning"	Placebo	4	15 August 1998	1
15 August 1998	1	"Needin' U"	David Morales presents The Face	8	15 August 1998	1
22 August 1998	5	"Music Sounds Better with You"	Stardust	2	22 August 1998	2
22 August 1998	6	"To the Moon and Back" ^{[K]}	Savage Garden	3	22 August 1998	1
22 August 1998	1	"I Want You Back"	Cleopatra	4	22 August 1998	1
22 August 1998	1	"The Air That I Breathe"	Simply Red	6	22 August 1998	1
22 August 1998	3	"Everything's Gonna Be Alright"	Sweetbox	5	29 August 1998	1
29 August 1998	2	"What Can I Do"	The Corrs	3	29 August 1998	1
29 August 1998	1	"Real Good Time"	Alda	7	29 August 1998	1
29 August 1998	1	"My Weakness Is None of Your Business"	Embrace	9	29 August 1998	1
5 September 1998	2	"If You Tolerate This Your Children Will Be Next"	Manic Street Preachers	1	5 September 1998	1
5 September 1998	5	"One for Sorrow"	Steps	2	5 September 1998	1
5 September 1998	5	"Finally Found"	Honeyz	4	19 September 1998	1
5 September 1998	1	"God Is a DJ"	Faithless	6	5 September 1998	1
5 September 1998	1	"Drowned World/Substitute for Love"	Madonna	10	5 September 1998	1
12 September 1998	2	"Bootie Call"	All Saints	1	12 September 1998	1
12 September 1998	2	"Everybody Get Up"	Five	2	12 September 1998	1
12 September 1998	3	"Crush"	Jennifer Paige	4	12 September 1998	2
12 September 1998	1	"My Favorite Mistake"	Sheryl Crow	9	12 September 1998	1
19 September 1998	4	"Millennium"	Robbie Williams	1	19 September 1998	1
19 September 1998	5	"Sex on the Beach"	T-Spoon	2	19 September 1998	1
26 September 1998	2	"I Want You Back"	Mel B featuring Missy Elliott	1	26 September 1998	1
26 September 1998	9	"I Don't Want to Miss a Thing"	Aerosmith	4	10 October 1998	2
26 September 1998	1	"Someone Loves You Honey"	Lutricia McNeal	9	26 September 1998	1
3 October 1998	4	"Rollercoaster"	B*Witched	1	3 October 1998	2
3 October 1998	4	"Perfect 10"	The Beautiful South	2	3 October 1998	1
3 October 1998	3	"Doo Wop (That Thing)"	Lauryn Hill	3	3 October 1998	1
10 October 1998	2	"Top of the World"	Brandy featuring Mase	2	10 October 1998	1
10 October 1998	1	"You Don't Care About Us"	Placebo	5	10 October 1998	1
10 October 1998	1	"Cruel Summer"	Ace of Base	8	10 October 1998	1
10 October 1998	1	"Come Back Darling"	UB40	10	10 October 1998	1
17 October 1998	4	"Girlfriend"	Billie	1	17 October 1998	1
17 October 1998	2	"Gangster Trippin"	Fatboy Slim	3	17 October 1998	1
17 October 1998	1	"Smoke"	Natalie Imbruglia	5	17 October 1998	1
17 October 1998	1	"The First Night"	Monica	6	17 October 1998	1
24 October 1998	2	"Gym and Tonic"	Spacedust	1	24 October 1998	1
24 October 1998	2	"More Than a Woman"	911	2	24 October 1998	1
24 October 1998	1	"Daysleeper"	R.E.M.	6	24 October 1998	1
24 October 1998	1	"How Deep Is Your Love"	Dru Hill	9	24 October 1998	1
24 October 1998	1	"Can't Keep This Feeling In"	Cliff Richard	10	24 October 1998	1
31 October 1998	12	"Believe" (#1)	Cher	1	31 October 1998	7
31 October 1998	3	"Outside"	George Michael	2	31 October 1998	2
31 October 1998	3	"Sweetest Thing"	U2	3	31 October 1998	1
31 October 1998	2	"I Just Wanna Be Loved"	Culture Club	4	31 October 1998	1
31 October 1998	2	"Thank U"	Alanis Morissette	5	31 October 1998	1
31 October 1998	1	"Little Bit of Lovin'"	Kele Le Roc	8	31 October 1998	1
7 November 1998	3	"Would You...?"	Touch and Go	3	7 November 1998	1
7 November 1998	1	"Guess I Was a Fool"	Another Level	5	7 November 1998	1
7 November 1998	1	"Blue Angels"	Pras Michel	6	7 November 1998	1
14 November 1998	2	"Each Time"	E-17 ^{[L]}	2	14 November 1998	1
14 November 1998	3	"If You Buy This Record (Your Life Will Be Better)"	The Tamperer featuring Maya	3	14 November 1998	1
14 November 1998	2	"Another One Bites the Dust"	Queen & Wyclef Jean featuring Pras & Free	5	14 November 1998	1
14 November 1998	1	"Daydreamin'"	Tatyana Ali	6	14 November 1998	1
14 November 1998	2	"Falling in Love Again"	Eagle-Eye Cherry	8	14 November 1998	1
21 November 1998	15	"Heartbeat"/"Tragedy" ♦	Steps	1	9 January 1999	1
21 November 1998	1	"The Bartender and the Thief"	Stereophonics	3	21 November 1998	1
21 November 1998	1	"Sit Down '98" ^{[M]}	James	7	21 November 1998	1
28 November 1998	2	"Until the Time Is Through"	Five	2	28 November 1998	1
28 November 1998	2	"I'm Your Angel"	Celine Dion & R. Kelly	3	28 November 1998	1
28 November 1998	3	"Up and Down"	Vengaboys	4	28 November 1998	2
28 November 1998	1	"So Young"	The Corrs	6	28 November 1998	1
28 November 1998	1	"Move Mania"	Sash! featuring Shannon	8	28 November 1998	1
28 November 1998	1	"From This Moment On"	Shania Twain	9	28 November 1998	1
28 November 1998	1	"Dreaming"	Ruff Driverz presents Arrola	10	28 November 1998	1
5 December 1998	4	"I Love the Way You Love Me"	Boyzone	2	5 December 1998	1
5 December 1998	4	"Miami" ^{[N]}	Will Smith	3	5 December 1998	1
5 December 1998	1	"The Power of Good-Bye"/"Little Star"	Madonna	6	5 December 1998	1
5 December 1998	1	"War of Nerves"	All Saints	7	5 December 1998	1
5 December 1998	1	"Searchin' My Soul"	Vonda Shepard	10	5 December 1998	1
12 December 1998	2	"Hard Knock Life (Ghetto Anthem)"	Jay-Z	2	12 December 1998	1
12 December 1998	10	"When You're Gone"	Bryan Adams featuring Melanie C	3	12 December 1998	1
12 December 1998	1	"No Regrets"/"Antmusic"	Robbie Williams	4	12 December 1998	1
12 December 1998	2	"Big Big World"	Emilia	5	12 December 1998	1
12 December 1998	1	"Take Me There"	Blackstreet & Mýa featuring Mase & Blinky Blink	7	12 December 1998	1
19 December 1998	4	"To You I Belong"	B*Witched	1	19 December 1998	1
19 December 1998	2	"She Wants You"	Billie	3	19 December 1998	1
19 December 1998	1	"When You Believe"	Mariah Carey & Whitney Houston	4	19 December 1998	1
19 December 1998	5	"End of the Line"	Honeyz	5	19 December 1998	1
26 December 1998	4	"Goodbye" (#8)	Spice Girls	1	26 December 1998	1
26 December 1998	5	"Chocolate Salty Balls" ♦ (#7)	Chef	1	2 January 1999	1
26 December 1998	3	"Especially for You" ^{[O]}^{[P]}	Denise & Johnny featuring Steps	3	26 December 1998	1
26 December 1998	1	"Cruise Into Christmas"	Jane McDonald	10	26 December 1998	1

== Entries by artist ==
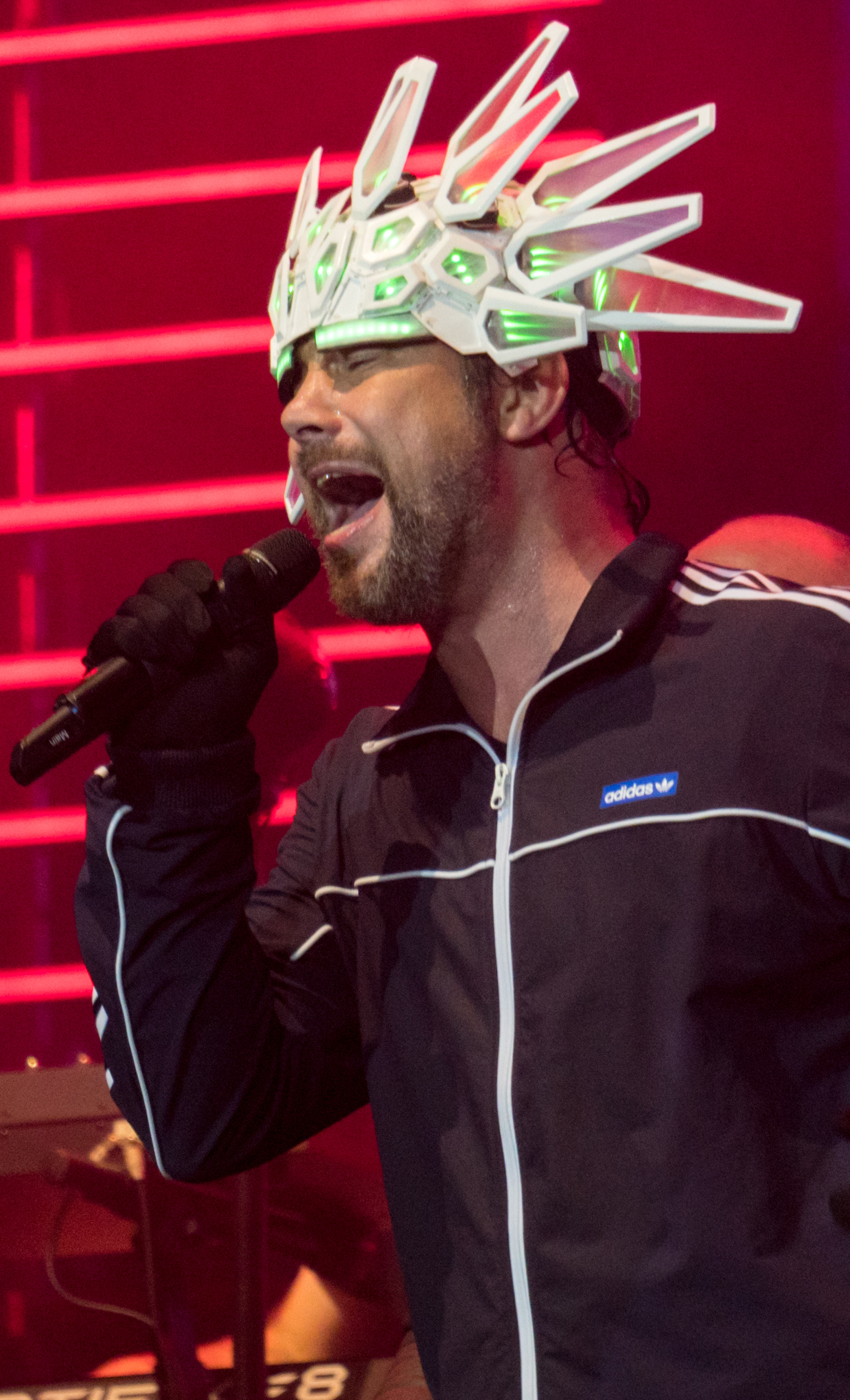
Jay Kay (pictured in 2017) and his band Jamiroquai scored their only UK number-one single in July 1998 with "Deeper Underground", taken from the soundtrack of the movie Godzilla.

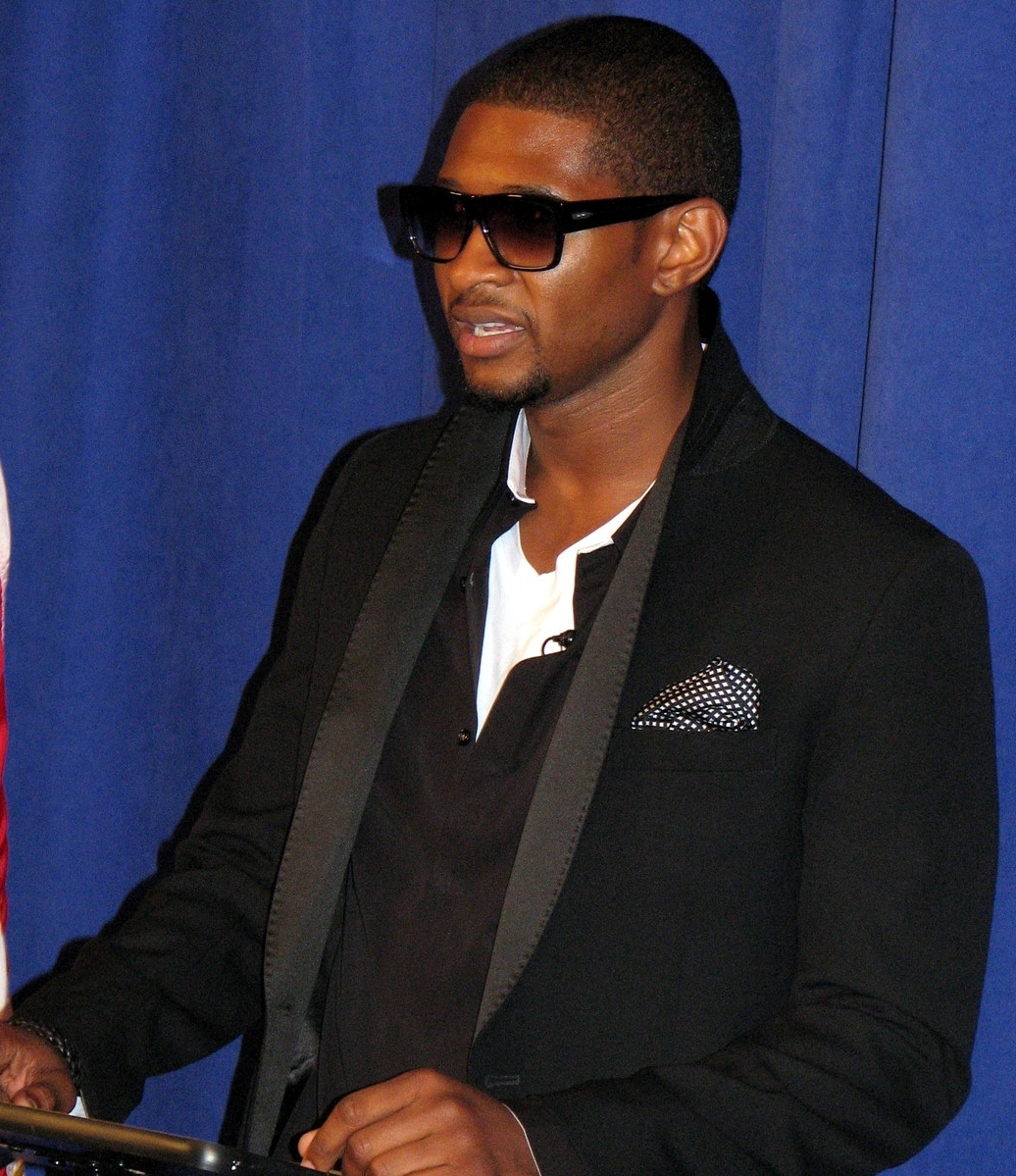
American R&B singer Usher (pictured in 2008) entered the UK top 10 for the first time this year with "You Make Me Wanna...", which spent one week at number-one in January.

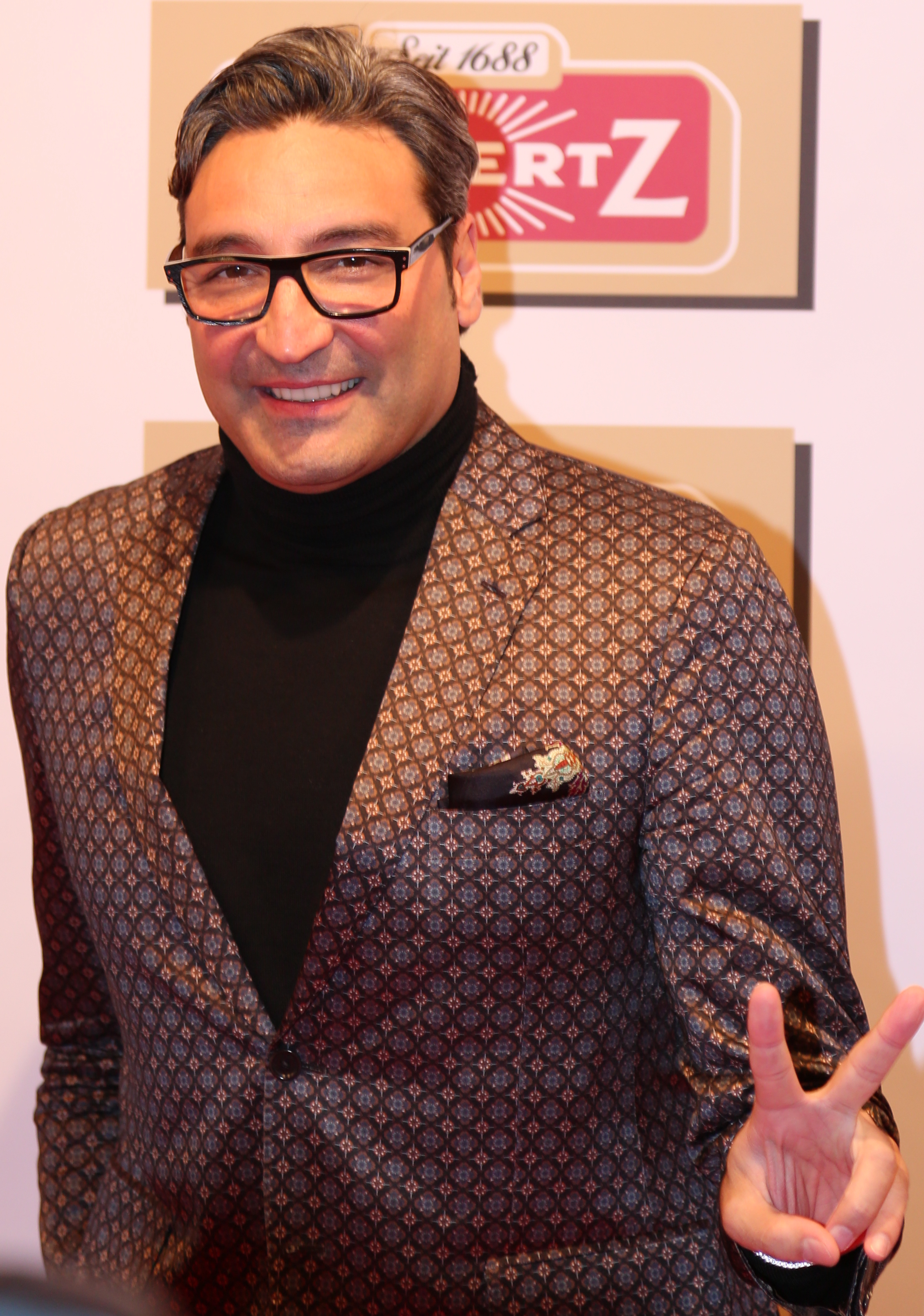
German DJ Mousse T. (pictured in 2017) spent six weeks in the top 10 in 1998 with his hit record "Horny '98", a collaboration with pop duo Hot 'n' Juicy, which peaked at number two.

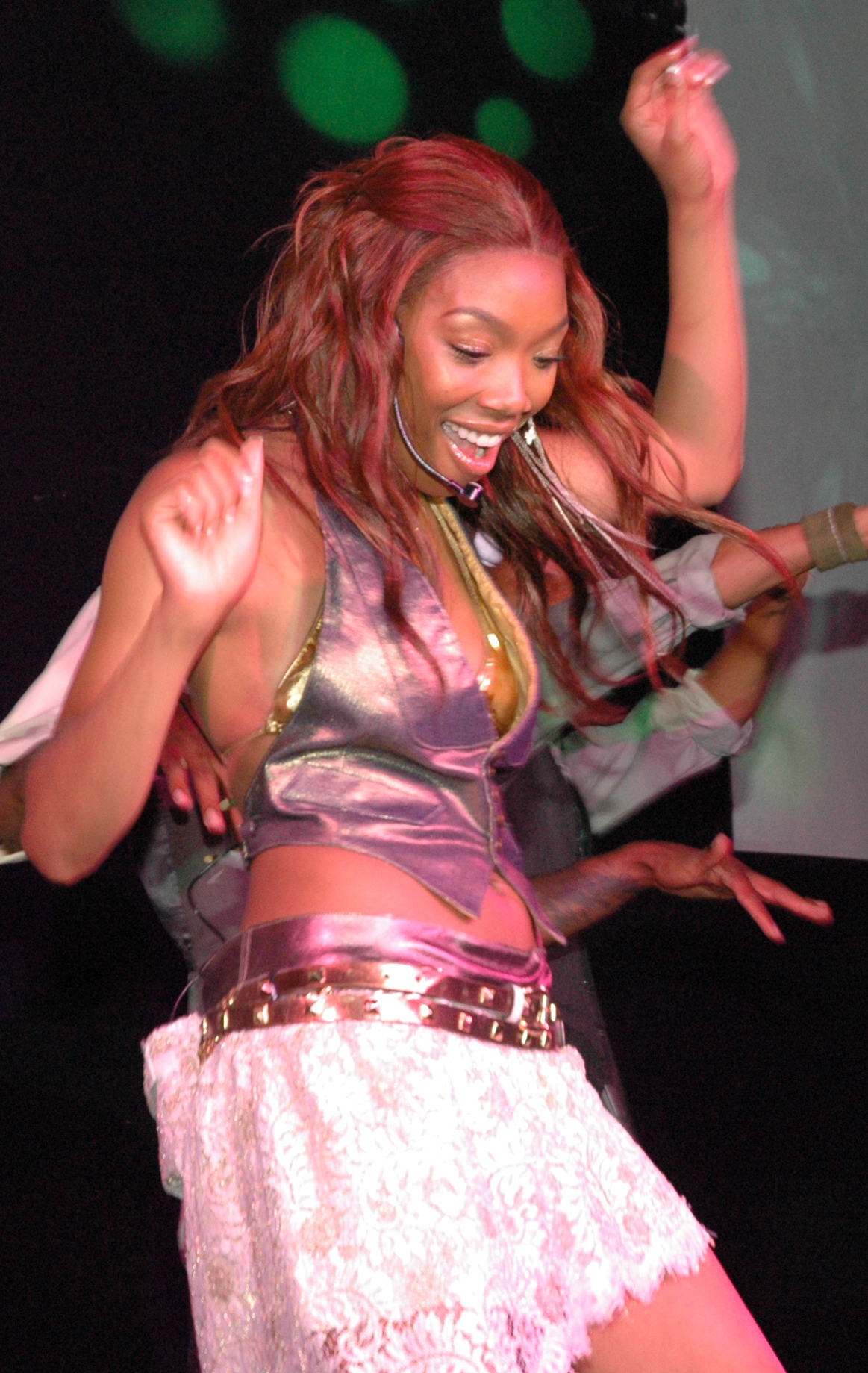
US R&B singer Brandy (pictured in 2004) had two singles in the top 10 this year, both reaching number two. "The Boy Is Mine" was a duet with fellow R&B artist Monica while "Top of the World" featured contributions from rapper and hip hop artist Mase.

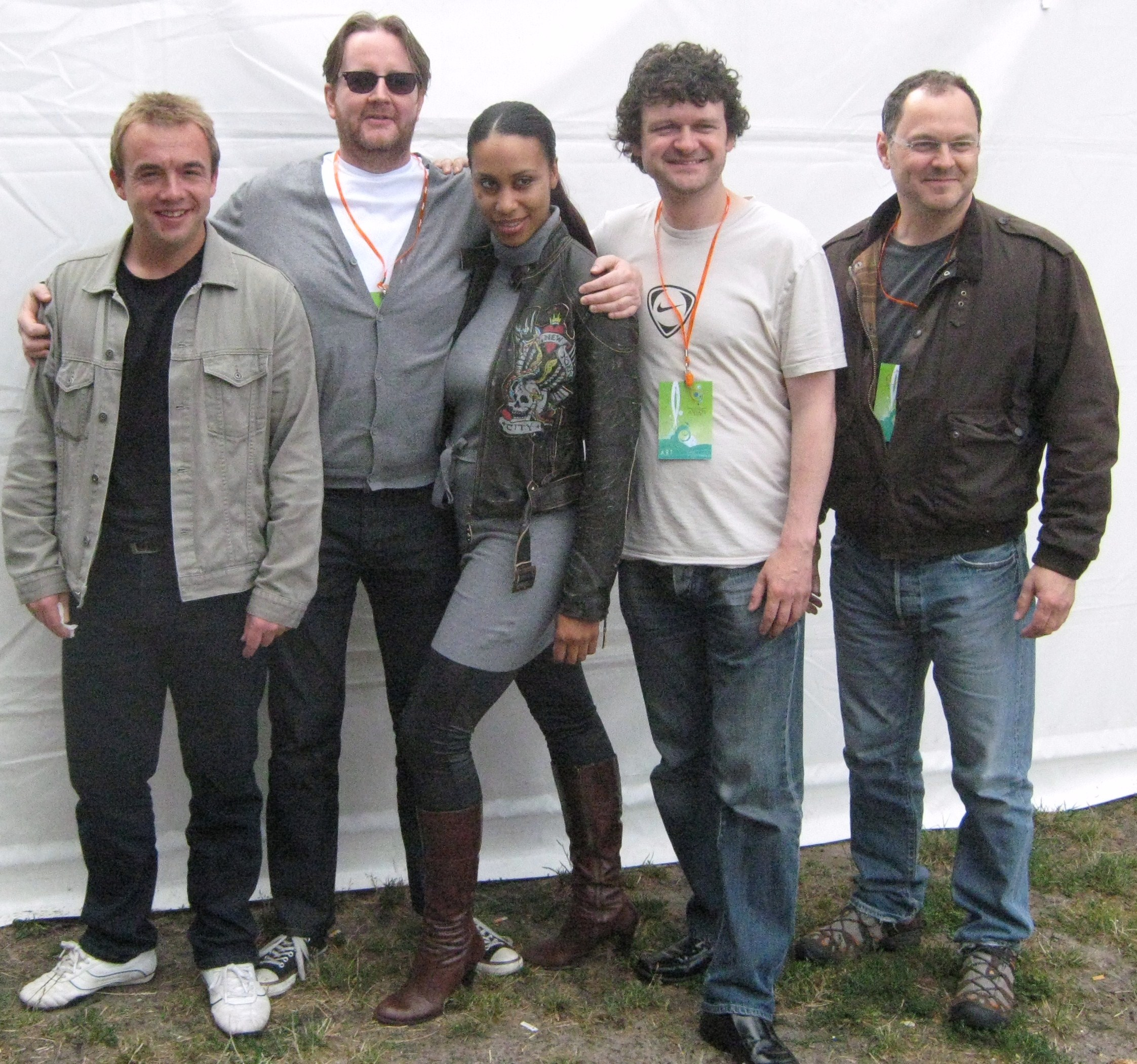
Jazz pop group Touch and Go (pictured in 2009) became one-hit wonders this year with their single "Would You...?", which reached number three in November.

The following table shows artists who achieved two or more top 10 entries in 1998, including singles that reached their peak in 1997 or 1999. The figures include both main artists and featured artists, while appearances on ensemble charity records are also counted for each artist.

Entries	Artist	Weeks	Singles
6	Mel B ^{[Q]}^{[R]}^{[S]}	15	"Goodbye", "(How Does It Feel to Be) On Top of the World", "I Want You Back", "Stop", "Too Much", "Viva Forever"
6	Melanie C ^{[Q]}^{[R]}^{[S]}^{[T]}	16	"Goodbye", "(How Does It Feel to Be) On Top of the World", "Stop", "Too Much", "Viva Forever", "When You're Gone"
5	Boyzone ^{[Q]}^{[V]}	17	"All That I Need", "Baby Can I Hold You"/"Shooting Star", "No Matter What", "I Love the Way You Love Me", "Perfect Day"
5	Spice Girls ^{[Q]}^{[S]}	13	"Goodbye", "(How Does It Feel to Be) On Top of the World", "Stop", "Too Much", "Viva Forever",
4	All Saints ^{[U]}	18	"Bootie Call", "Never Ever", "Under the Bridge"/"Lady Marmalade", "War of Nerves"
4	Aqua ^{[Q]}	12	"Barbie Girl", "Doctor Jones", "My Oh My", "Turn Back Time"
4	Five	9	"Everybody Get Up", "Got the Feelin'", "Until the Time Is Through", "When the Lights Go Out"
4	Madonna	8	"Drowned World"/"Substitute for Love", "Frozen", "Ray of Light", "The Power of Good-Bye"/"Little Star"
4	Robbie Williams ^{[U]}	18	"Angels", "Let Me Entertain You", "Millennium", "No Regrets"/"Antmusic"
4	Steps ^{[W]}^{[X]}	18	"Especially for You", "Heartbeat"/"Tragedy", "Last Thing on My Mind", "One for Sorrow"
3	911	5	"All I Want Is You", "How Do You Want Me to Love You?", "More Than a Woman"
3	Another Level	8	"Be Alone No More", "Freak Me", "Guess I Was a Fool"
3	B*Witched	15	"C'est la Vie", "Rollercoaster", "To You I Belong"
3	Billie	10	"Because We Want To", "Girlfriend", "I Want You"
3	Celine Dion	14	"Immortality", "I'm Your Angel", "My Heart Will Go On"
3	Cerys Matthews ^{[Y]}	6	"The Ballad of Tom Jones", "Mulder and Scully", "Road Rage"
3	Cleopatra	6	"Cleopatra's Theme", "I Want You Back", "Life Ain't Easy"
3	The Corrs	6	"Dreams", "So Young", "What Can I Do"
3	Natalie Imbruglia ^{[Q]}	6	"Big Mistake", "Smoke", "Torn"
3	Pras Michel ^{[Z]}	13	"Another One Bites the Dust", "Blue Angels", "Ghetto Supastar (That Is What You Are)",
3	Sash!	8	"La Primavera", "Move Mania", "Mysterious Times"
3	Space ^{[S]}	4	"Avenging Angels", "(How Does It Feel to Be) On Top of the World", "The Ballad of Tom Jones"
3	Will Smith	8	"Gettin' Jiggy wit It", "Just the Two of Us", "Miami"
2	Ace of Base	5	"Cruel Summer", "Life Is a Flower"
2	Bono ^{[Q]}^{[V]}^{[AA]}	7	"Perfect Day", "Sweetest Thing"
2	Brandy	8	"The Boy Is Mine", "Top of the World"
2	Catatonia	4	"Mulder and Scully", "Road Rage"
2	Eagle-Eye Cherry	8	"Falling in Love Again", "Save Tonight"
2	Embrace	2	"Come Back to What You Know", "My Weakness Is None of Your Business"
2	Fatboy Slim	3	"Gangster Trippin", "The Rockafeller Skank"
2	Garbage	2	"I Think I'm Paranoid", "Push It"
2	Heather Small ^{[Q]}^{[V]}^{[BB]}	5	"Angel St", "Perfect Day"
2	Honeyz	7	"End of the Line", "Finally Found"
2	Ian Broudie ^{[Q]}^{[V]}^{[CC]}	8	"Perfect Day", "Three Lions '98"
2	Janet Jackson ^{[Q]}	8	"I Get Lonely", "Together Again"
2	Lighthouse Family	8	"High", "Lost in Space"
2	Lutricia McNeal	5	"Someone Loves You Honey", "Stranded"
2	Mariah Carey	2	"My All", "When You Believe"
2	Mase ^{[DD]}^{[EE]}	3	"Take Me There", "Top of the World"
2	Monica	7	"The Boy Is Mine", "The First Night"
2	Mýa ^{[FF]}	11	"Ghetto Supastar (That Is What You Are)", "Take Me There"
2	Placebo	2	"Pure Morning", "You Don't Care About Us"
2	R. Kelly ^{[GG]}	3	"Be Careful", "I'm Your Angel"
2	Savage Garden	17	"To the Moon and Back", "Truly Madly Deeply"
2	Shania Twain	2	"From This Moment On", "You're Still the One"
2	Simply Red	2	"Say You Love Me", "The Air That I Breathe"
2	The Tamperer featuring Maya	11	"Feel It", "If You Buy This Record Your Life Will Be Better"
2	Wyclef Jean	5	"Another One Bites the Dust", "Gone till November"

== Notes ==
- ^{a} "Heartbeat"/"Tragedy" reached its peak of number-one on 9 January 1999.
- ^{b} "Chocolate Salty Balls (P.S. I Love You)" reached its peak of number-one on 2 January 1999.
- ^{c} "Something About the Way You Look Tonight"/"Candle in the Wind 1997" re-entered the top 10 at number 10 on 6 December 1997 (week ending), at number 10 on 20 December 1997 (week ending) and at number 10 on 3 January 1998 (week ending).
- ^{d} Released as the official single for Children in Need in 1997.
- ^{e} The original version of "Renegade Master" peaked outside the top 10 at number 11 upon its release in 1995. The remix by Fatboy Slim, entitled "Renegade Master '98", was released less than three years after Roger McKenzie (Wildchild)'s death.
- ^{f} "Brimful of Asha" originally peaked outside the top 10 at number 60 upon its initial release in 1997. After a remixed version by Norman Cook became a radio and critical success, the song was re-released and reached number one in February 1998.
- ^{g} "How Do I Live" re-entered the top 10 at number 9 on 11 April 1998 (week ending) for 3 weeks and at number 9 on 30 May 1998 (week ending) for 2 weeks.
- ^{h} "The Boy Is Mine" re-entered the top 10 at number 9 on 11 July 1998 (week ending) for 2 weeks.
- ^{i} England United was a supergroup consisting of Echo and the Bunnymen, Space, Spice Girls and Ocean Colour Scene.
- ^{j} "You're the One That I Want" originally peaked at number-one for 9 weeks upon its initial release in 1978. The song was re-released in 1998 to mark the 20th anniversary of Grease.
- ^{k} "To the Moon and Back" originally peaked outside the top 10 at number 55 upon its initial release in 1997.
- ^{l} East 17 were known as E-17 from 1998 until 1999.
- ^{m} The original version of "Sit Down" peaked at number 77 upon its release in 1989. A re-recorded version was released in 1991 and peaked at number 2. The 1998 remix of "Sit Down" was remixed by Apollo 440.
- ^{n} "Miami" re-entered the top 10 at number 9 on 2 January 1999 (week ending) for 2 weeks.
- ^{o} Denise van Outen, Johnny Vaughan and Steps covered Kylie Minogue and Jason Donovan's hit "Especially for You" as the official Children in Need single for 1998.
- ^{p} Released as the official single for Children in Need.
- ^{q} Figure includes song that peaked in 1997.
- ^{r} Figure includes four top 10 hits with the group Spice Girls.
- ^{s} Figure includes an appearance on 'England United' World Cup single "(How Does It Feel to Be) on Top of the World?".
- ^{t} Figure includes appearance on Bryan Adams' "When You're Gone".
- ^{u} Figure includes song that first charted in 1997 but peaked in 1998.
- ^{v} Figure includes an appearance on the "Perfect Day" charity single.
- ^{w} Figure includes song that peaked in 1999.
- ^{x} Figure includes appearance on Denise and Johnny's "Especially for You".
- ^{y} Figure includes two top 10 hits with the group Catatonia.
- ^{z} Figure includes appearance on Queen and Wyclef Jean's "Another One Bites the Dust".
- ^{aa} Figure includes a top 10 hit with the group U2.
- ^{bb} Figure includes a top 10 hit with the group M People.
- ^{cc} Figures includes a top 10 hit with the group The Lightning Seeds.
- ^{dd} Figure includes appearance on Blackstreet and Mýa's "Take Me There".
- ^{ee} Figure includes appearance on Brandy's "Top of the World".
- ^{ff} Figure includes appearance on Pras Michel's "Ghetto Supastar (That Is What You Are)".
- ^{gg} Figure includes appearance on Sparkle's "Be Careful".

== See also ==
- 1998 in British music
- List of number-one singles from the 1990s (UK)
