= 1998 in British music =

This is a summary of 1998 in music in the United Kingdom, including the official charts from that year.

== Summary ==
The first chart of the year saw the BBC Children in Need single "Perfect Day", performed by a collaboration of various stars, return to the top of the charts for a week, displacing "Too Much" by the Spice Girls.

=== Disappearances and resurgences ===
January saw R'N'B vocalist Usher Raymond score a No. 1 with his debut single "You Make Me Wanna..."; he would not return to the top of the UK singles charts until 2004. Although Usher's resurgence was yet to come, the lead singer of The Stone Roses was to resurge this year. Ian Brown released his debut solo single "My Star" which peaked at #5. His debut album also became a success, making No. 4 on the charts. Oasis also scored their 4th UK chart topper in January, which was their last release for two years as they embarked on a massive world tour which brought along the expected controversy and increased publicity for the band.

=== Girl groups and boy bands ===
Throughout the year, girl groups remained prevalent. All Saints who made No. 4 with their debut single "I Know Where It's At" in late 1997, clocked up 3 chart toppers across the year: the 1.25 million selling "Never Ever", popular covers of Red Hot Chili Peppers' "Under the Bridge" and Labelle's "Lady Marmalade" (both released as a double A-side) and laid-back dance track "Bootie Call", all tracks from their debut self-titled album, which itself was successful, reaching #2. They did not release any new material during 1999, but returned to the charts in 2000. Irish quartet B*Witched received great success across Europe and even mild success in the US, combining Irish folk with mainstream Western pop. Their debut single "C'est la Vie" made them the youngest group to debut at No. 1 in the UK and even went Top 10 in the US. Dance-associated "Rollercoaster" and emotional ballad "To You I Belong" quickly became 2 more UK chart toppers for the girls. Cleopatra, made up of three sisters from Manchester (Cleo, Zainam & Yonah), had major success in the United Kingdom, Europe and the United States. Their first 3 singles went straight into the top 5 of the UK singles chart and later that year they were signed to Madonna's U.S. label Maverick Records.

Success was facilitated for The All Saints and B*Witched because of the declining career of the Spice Girls. Their third release from their second album, Spiceworld, "Stop" was a minimal hit in the US and became their first single not to top the UK charts, ending the run of consecutive #1's at 6. Making matters worse, Geri Halliwell (also known as Ginger Spice) announced her departure from the group on 31 May after missing various concerts and an appearance on the national lottery. Their final release from their second album, "Viva Forever", was able to top the charts for 2 weeks. The video was an animated one with the Spice Girls featured as fairies, because at the time the Spice Girls were touring America; hence, they couldn't shoot a video for it. "Goodbye" became the girls' 8th chart topper at the end of the year, and was seen as a tribute to Geri. It took the Christmas number one position, making the Spice Girls only the second act to achieve 3 consecutive Christmas number one singles; the first being The Beatles. "Goodbye" was also the fastest selling single of 1998 shifting over 380,000 copies in just 7 days. Solo careers started for the two Melanies from the group in 1998 with Melanie B topping the UK charts with "I Want You Back", a duet with rapper Missy Elliott and Melanie C hitting No. 3 with "When You're Gone", a duet with Canadian rocker Bryan Adams. Whilst Melanie B's career slowly went into a downward spiral, Melanie C's was yet to grow.

Although the 1990s was full of boybands, 1998 was not the strongest year for them on the singles or albums chart. Five managed to have their debut album hit the top, but were yet to experience a No. 1 single. Boyzone were by far the most successful boyband of the year with 2 No. 1 singles "All That I Need", and "No Matter What", the latter of which sold over 1.07 million copies (it was taken from Andrew Lloyd Webber's musical, Whistle Down the Wind) and also saw their new album Where We Belong hit the top of the albums chart. American group Backstreet Boys would start the year with the release of All I Have To Give, their third and final single from their 1997 album Backstreet's Back. The single was big in the UK, reaching number 2. However, they had no more releases until the following year.

=== American acts ===
Many American acts this year were very successful in the UK, yet were still slightly more successful back home. Cher was biggest artist of the year on the chart. When "Believe", the lead single of her 22nd studio album of the same name, debuted atop on 31 October, it stayed on the spot for seven consecutive weeks (the longest running #1 of the year) and became the biggest-selling single of the year and in UK history by a female singer. Brandy & Monica made No. 2 with "The Boy Is Mine", which had a 13-week run at the top of the US chart, but it was a very successful year in the UK for Brandy, who had 2 No. 2 hits. Another US No. 1, "I'm Your Angel", by R. Kelly and Céline Dion, only made No. 3 in the UK. Mariah Carey hit No. 4 with solo release "My All", which became another chart-topper for her in the US; however, her duet with Whitney Houston, "When You Believe" from the soundtrack to The Prince of Egypt was a bigger hit in the UK than in the US, making No. 4 here and only making No. 15 on the Hot 100. Aerosmith scored their biggest global hit throughout their career to date: "I Don't Want to Miss a Thing", from the soundtrack to Armageddon, made No. 4 in the UK and entered the US charts at #1. Former Fugees member Lauryn Hill hit No. 3 with her debut solo single "Doo Wap (That Thing)", which topped the charts in the US. Her worldwide hit album, The Miseducation of Lauryn Hill was very successful in the UK, hitting No. 2 on the albums chart.

Other US acts who succeeded in the UK during 1998 but were not quite as popular back home were Aaron Carter and Madonna. Carter had his most successful year ever in the UK, clocking up 3 Top 30 hits and a place in the Top 20 with his eponymous debut album. Madonna failed to top the US charts, but did so in the UK, with "Frozen", becoming her 8th UK chart-topper; it was only able to make No. 2 in the US. Her new, dance-influenced, album, Ray of Light also topped the charts, producing several other hits including the title track which made #2. Hip Hop trio Destiny's Child began their career with the release of their single, "No, No, No", which made No. 5 in the UK and No. 3 in the US. Their debut album was a relative flop in both countries, but was more successful here than in the US.

Noted for its long-lasting popularity was the debut single from LeAnn Rimes, "How Do I Live", which spent 33 weeks in the UK Top 40, selling 714,000 copies and becoming the biggest-selling single ever to peak at No. 7 (it finished higher in the "year end" chart than in the weekly charts). It was more popular in the US, spending 32 weeks in the US Top 10, 61 weeks in the US Top 40 and 69 weeks on the Billboard Hot 100.

=== British acts ===
Two UK rock bands were prevalent on the albums and singles chart. The Verve's album Urban Hymns was number one for a total of 7 weeks. The album spawned two hit singles: the chart topping "The Drugs Don't Work" and the No. 2 hit, "Bitter Sweet Symphony", which was on the soundtrack to the film Cruel Intentions. Welsh rock band, Manic Street Preachers scored their first No. 1 single, "If You Tolerate This Your Children Will Be Next" and their new album This Is My Truth Tell Me Yours also topped the charts.

Ex-Take That member, Robbie Williams topped the albums chart twice during the year, when his debut album, Life Thru a Lens returned to the charts and managed to climb to the No. 1 spot. His second album, I've Been Expecting You topped the charts later on in the year and gave the star his first No. 1 single, "Millennium". I've Been Expecting You remains his biggest selling album, with over 2.7 million copies sold. Irish family folk band, The Corrs received massive success with their album, Talk on Corners which went on to sell over 2.7 million copies and topped the albums charts for 10 weeks (6 during 1998). The singles "Dreams", "So Young" and "What Can I Do?" from the album all reached the Top 10.

=== Acts from other countries ===
Australian singer Natalie Imbruglia followed up the success of her No. 2 hit "Torn" from 1997 with three more hits, two of which reached the top 5. Danish-Norwegian pop outfit, Aqua completed a hat-trick of Number Ones after the massive success of "Barbie Girl", as "Doctor Jones" and "Turn Back Time" both hit the top. The first was a slightly similar sounding track to their debut single, but "Turn Back Time" was a much slower track than their previous two singles. Their debut album, Aquarium reached No. 6 on the albums chart. They followed up their three consecutive Number Ones with two further hits by the end of the year; the former hit the Top 10 and the latter made the Top 20. They did not return to the UK charts until 2000.

=== Covers and reworkings ===
The 1996 hit "Three Lions", written for the Euro 96 football championships, was re-written for the World Cup as "Three Lions '98" and topped the charts for 3 weeks, becoming more successful than the original. Run DMC's 1983 hit "It's like That" was remixed by Jason Nevins and topped the charts for 6 weeks, selling 1.12 million copies. The song was one of the fastest selling singles of the year, and also kept the Spice Girls' "Stop" off the top of the charts, breaking the band's run of consecutive No. 1 singles. A Norman Cook remix of the Cornershop single, "Brimful of Asha" saw the British duo top the charts with a track that originally failed to make the Top 40 the previous year. The song comprised music from the duo's Indian roots with Western rock beats.

=== Popular genres ===
Various styles of rock bands topped the albums and singles charts in the earlier part of the year with everything from pop-rock to alternative electronic rock. This included Oasis, Garbage, Catatonia, Space, Embrace, Pulp and Massive Attack. Jamiroquai topped the singles chart with their release "Deeper Underground"; their album Synkronized made No. 1 the following year. Pop act Savage Garden reached No. 2 with their debut self-titled album, after the success of their No. 4 hit from 1997, "Truly Madly Deeply". Simply Red topped the albums chart with their new release Blue. Extending the success of pop acts on the albums chart during 1998 was singer Jane McDonald whose debut self-titled album topped the charts for 3 weeks. She released one single from the album, "Cruise into Christmas", a special release for the festive season which made No. 10 on the singles chart.

=== Breaking records ===
Age records were broken in 1998 at both ends of the spectrum. Billie became the second youngest solo female to obtain a chart topper at the age of 15 (Helen Shapiro being the youngest – 14 years old) and became the youngest solo female to enter at Number One. She had received a recording contract after appearing in an advertising campaign for Smash Hits magazine. Her debut single "Because We Want To" and follow up "Girlfriend" both topped the UK charts, each for one week. On the other end of the range, Cher at 52 years of age became the oldest solo female to top the UK charts. "Believe" topped the charts for 7 weeks, becoming the longest stay since "Wannabe" in 1996 and also the last single to spend more than 3 weeks at the top in that millennium. "Believe" also became the largest selling single by a female artist in the UK, with 1.67 million copies sold. Her album of the same name topped the charts on both sides of the Atlantic.

=== Greatest hits ===
The last few months of the year were filled with greatest hits compilations. Reaching No. 10 in the albums chart was a compilation from Mariah Carey of all her No. 1 singles to that point. It contained everything from her debut single "Vision of Love" to her most recent work "Honey", as well as some bonus tracks, "When You Believe", a duet with Whitney Houston, "Sweetheart" a duet with Jermaine Dupri, and "I Still Believe", a cover of the hit song from Brenda K. Starr. Other compilations came from Phil Collins, whose album was entitled Hits and from U2 who released The Best of 1980 – 1990 & B-sides. Both topped the albums chart. However, the most successful came from George Michael, who topped the albums chart for 8 weeks, the longest stay since Spice managed a consecutive 8-week run in 1996, with Ladies And Gentlemen – The Best of George Michael. It included his 7 UK number one singles, and other hits since his career began in 1984.

=== Hip hop ===
The Beastie Boys had their biggest UK hit to date with the single "Intergalactic" which got to No. 4, and their studio album Hello Nasty got to #1. Unlike the previous year, where LL Cool J, Puff Daddy and Will Smith all topped the UK singles chart, no Hip Hop single reached number one. Jason Nevins's remix with Run DMC "It's like that" reached the top spot, but the remix is considered a dance song. Jay-Z and Busta Rhymes both got as high as #2. Pras Michel of The Fugees released his breakthrough track "Ghetto Superstar", featuring Mýa and ODB, was one of the best-selling tracks in the UK, selling 680,000 copies.

=== Film music ===
Film music dominated the February chart with the soundtrack to Titanic topping the albums chart for a cumulative total of 3 weeks. Composed by James Horner, the soundtrack included the song, "My Heart Will Go On". Sung by Céline Dion, it sold 1.31 million copies in the UK alone and topped the charts on both sides of the Atlantic. The film set a new record for box office sales.

English composer Anne Dudley won an Academy Award for Best Original Musical or Comedy Score for The Full Monty. Work by Scottish composer Craig Armstrong was featured in the score of The Negotiator, and John Powell produced his second major film score, for Antz.

=== Classical music ===
Film composer John Barry produced his first full-length classical work, The Beyondness of Things. One of Britain's most successful classical composers, Sir Michael Tippett, died at the age of 93, having developed pneumonia while visiting Stockholm for a retrospective of his concert music. It was also the year when 12-year-old soprano Charlotte Church produced her first album, Voice of an Angel, which was certified triple platinum in UK sales alone, and launched her career as an opera crossover artist. Her countryman, rising star Bryn Terfel, gave a recital at Carnegie Hall. Established opera singer Lesley Garrett released her hit album of the same name, including songs from popular musicals as well as operatic arias.

== Events ==
- 15 February – The first concert hall performance of Anthony Payne's reconstruction of Elgar's Third Symphony took place at the Royal Festival Hall by the BBC Symphony Orchestra, conductor Andrew Davis.
- 19 February – Danbert Nobacon of Chumbawamba pours a bucket of ice over UK Deputy Prime Minister John Prescott at the 1998 Brit Awards
- 6 March – Liam Gallagher is charged with assault, for allegedly breaking a fan's nose in Brisbane, Australia after the fan took photographs.
- 12 March – Liam Gallagher is banned from Hong Kong-based Cathay Pacific after he allegedly abused passengers and crew on a flight between the UK and Australia.
- 14 March – The Little Concerto for Strings by Jonathan Harvey is performed for the first time at Imperial College London.
- 25 March – Mark Morrison is arrested and sentenced to jail for paying a lookalike to perform his court-appointed community service in his stead, while Morrison went on tour.
- 7 April – Mark E. Smith gets into fights and onstage arguments with bandmates from the Fall during a gig in Brownies, New York. The incident leads to three members of the band leaving, and on the following day, Smith is arrested and charged with assaulting band member Julia Nagle.
- 9 April – George Michael is arrested in a park in Beverly Hills, California after being caught in a "lewd act" by an undercover police officer, who was operating in a sting operation using so-called "pretty police". Michael was fined $810 and was sentenced to 80 hours' community service. Michael would soon "come out" and send up the incident in the video for his single "Outside".
- 24 May – The Verve play a homecoming gig at Haigh Hall, Aspull, in front of 33,000 fans.
- 31 May – Geri Halliwell announces her departure from the Spice Girls
- 29 August – The Chart Show is dropped from ITV and is replaced with CD:UK, which runs until 2006.
- 23 October – Former Stone Roses singer Ian Brown is jailed for threatening behaviour towards a stewardess on a British Airways flight from Paris, a charge he denies. He is sentenced to four months in Strangeways Prison, Manchester, and is released after serving two months of his sentence.
- 12 November – Massive Attack win Best Video for "Teardrop" at the MTV Europe Music Awards ceremony, held in Milan. They are presented with their award by Sarah Ferguson, Duchess of York, who fluffs her lines and gets the band's name wrong; in response, the band snub her and use profanity in their acceptance speech before leaving.

== Charts ==
=== Number-one singles ===
Chart date (week ending)	Song	Artist(s)	Sales
3 January	"Too Much"	Spice Girls	218,000
10 January	"Perfect Day"	Various Artists	83,000
17 January	"Never Ever"	All Saints	54,000
24 January	"All Around the World"	Oasis	110,000
31 January	"You Make Me Wanna..."	Usher	106,968
7 February	"Doctor Jones"	Aqua	102,000
14 February	"Doctor Jones"	Aqua	117,000
21 February	"My Heart Will Go On"	Céline Dion	234,700
28 February	"Brimful of Asha"	Cornershop	208,321
7 March	"Frozen"	Madonna	197,000
14 March	"My Heart Will Go On"	Céline Dion	112,000
21 March	"It's Like That"	Run–D.M.C. vs. Jason Nevins	246,765
28 March	"It's Like That"	Run–D.M.C. vs. Jason Nevins	167,000
4 April	"It's Like That"	Run–D.M.C. vs. Jason Nevins	136,000
11 April	"It's Like That"	Run–D.M.C. vs. Jason Nevins	114,000
18 April	"It's Like That"	Run–D.M.C. vs. Jason Nevins	128,000
25 April	"It's Like That"	Run–D.M.C. vs. Jason Nevins	87,000
2 May	"All That I Need"	Boyzone	80,049
9 May	"Under the Bridge / Lady Marmalade"	All Saints	106,956
16 May	"Turn Back Time"	Aqua	75,000
23 May	"Under the Bridge / Lady Marmalade"	All Saints	50,714
30 May	"Feel It"	The Tamperer featuring Maya	49,500
6 June	"C'est la Vie"	B*Witched	153,000
13 June	"C'est la Vie"	B*Witched	93,000
20 June	"Three Lions '98"	Baddiel, Skinner & The Lightning Seeds	232,075
27 June	"Three Lions '98"	Baddiel, Skinner & The Lightning Seeds	150,000
4 July	"Three Lions '98"	Baddiel, Skinner & The Lightning Seeds	104,000
11 July	"Because We Want To"	Billie Piper	80,000
18 July	"Freak Me"	Another Level	99,000
25 July	"Deeper Underground"	Jamiroquai	89,000
1 August	"Viva Forever"	Spice Girls	277,911
8 August	"Viva Forever"	Spice Girls	112,000
15 August	"No Matter What"	Boyzone	277,554
22 August	"No Matter What"	Boyzone	176,000
29 August	"No Matter What"	Boyzone	148,442
5 September	"If You Tolerate This Your Children Will Be Next"	Manic Street Preachers	148,000
12 September	"Bootie Call"	All Saints	116,000
19 September	"Millennium"	Robbie Williams	140,000
26 September	"I Want You Back"	Melanie B featuring Missy Elliott	86,000
3 October	"Rollercoaster"	B*Witched	156,800
10 October	"Rollercoaster"	B*Witched	112,000
17 October	"Girlfriend"	Billie Piper	119,000
24 October	"Gym and Tonic"	Spacedust	66,000
31 October	"Believe"	Cher	167,000
7 November	"Believe"	Cher	205,000
14 November	"Believe"	Cher	187,000
21 November	"Believe"	Cher	165,000
28 November	"Believe"	Cher	139,000
5 December	"Believe"	Cher	126,000
12 December	"Believe"	Cher	114,000
19 December	"To You I Belong"	B*Witched	150,000
26 December	"Goodbye"	Spice Girls	380,000

=== Number-one albums ===
Chart date (week ending)	Album	Artist	Sales
3 January	Urban Hymns	The Verve	225,000
10 January	Urban Hymns	The Verve	78,000
17 January	Urban Hymns	The Verve	53,000
24 January	Urban Hymns	The Verve	44,000
31 January	Urban Hymns	The Verve	39,000
7 February	Urban Hymns	The Verve	41,000
14 February	Titanic	James Horner	52,000
21 February	Urban Hymns	The Verve	123,000
28 February	Titanic	James Horner	68,000
7 March	Titanic	James Horner	63,000
14 March	Ray of Light	Madonna	140,000
21 March	Ray of Light	Madonna	74,000
28 March	Let's Talk About Love	Céline Dion	89,000
4 April	The Best of	James	58,000
11 April	This Is Hardcore	Pulp	50,000
18 April	Life Thru a Lens	Robbie Williams	42,995
25 April	Life Thru a Lens	Robbie Williams	31,000
2 May	Mezzanine	Massive Attack	86,000
9 May	Mezzanine	Massive Attack	38,000
16 May	International Velvet	Catatonia	32,000
23 May	Version 2.0	Garbage	31,500
30 May	Blue	Simply Red	84,000
6 June	Where We Belong	Boyzone	83,000
13 June	Blue	Simply Red	46,000
20 June	The Good Will Out	Embrace	43,000
27 June	Talk on Corners	The Corrs	34,300
4 July	5ive	Five	29,700
11 July	Talk on Corners	The Corrs	23,996
18 July	Hello Nasty	Beastie Boys	58,000
25 July	Jane McDonald	Jane McDonald	31,000
1 August	Jane McDonald	Jane McDonald	41,000
8 August	Jane McDonald	Jane McDonald	29,000
15 August	Talk on Corners	The Corrs	24,965
22 August	Talk on Corners	The Corrs	26,500
29 August	Talk on Corners	The Corrs	39,300
5 September	Where We Belong	Boyzone	63,000
12 September	Where We Belong	Boyzone	47,500
19 September	Talk on Corners	The Corrs	50,000
26 September	This Is My Truth Tell Me Yours	Manic Street Preachers	136,000
3 October	This Is My Truth Tell Me Yours	Manic Street Preachers	60,000
10 October	This Is My Truth Tell Me Yours	Manic Street Preachers	40,600
17 October	Hits	Phil Collins	85,000
24 October	Quench	The Beautiful South	95,000
31 October	Quench	The Beautiful South	63,000
7 November	I've Been Expecting You	Robbie Williams	132,000
14 November	The Best of 1980–1990	U2	144,000
21 November	Ladies & Gentlemen: The Best of George Michael	George Michael	144,684
28 November	Ladies & Gentlemen: The Best of George Michael	George Michael	111,000
5 December	Ladies & Gentlemen: The Best of George Michael	George Michael	135,000
12 December	Ladies & Gentlemen: The Best of George Michael	George Michael	150,000
19 December	Ladies & Gentlemen: The Best of George Michael	George Michael	239,000
26 December	Ladies & Gentlemen: The Best of George Michael	George Michael	308,714

=== Number-one compilation albums ===
Chart date (week ending)	Album
3 January	Diana Princess of Wales – Tribute
10 January	Now 38
17 January	Now 38
24 January	The Eighties Mix
31 January	The Eighties Mix
7 February	Ultimate Club Mix
14 February	Ibiza in the Mix '98
21 February	Love
28 February	Ibiza in the Mix '98
7 March	Fantastic 80s! 2
14 March	The Full Monty
21 March	The Full Monty
28 March	The Full Monty
4 April	New Hits 98
11 April	New Hits 98
18 April	Now 39
25 April	Now 39
2 May	Now 39
9 May	Now 39
16 May	Now 39
23 May	Now 39
30 May	Now 39
6 June	Now 39
13 June	The Box Hits 98 – Volume 2
20 June	The Box Hits 98 – Volume 2
27 June	The Box Hits 98 – Volume 2
4 July	Fresh Hits 98
11 July	Fresh Hits 98
18 July	Fresh Hits 98
25 July	Fresh Hits 98
1 August	Fresh Hits 98
8 August	Fresh Hits 98
15 August	Now 40
22 August	Now 40
29 August	Now 40
5 September	Now 40
12 September	The Ibiza Annual
19 September	Big Hits 98
26 September	Big Hits 98
3 October	Big Hits 98
10 October	Big Hits 98
17 October	Big Hits 98
24 October	In the Mix Ibiza
31 October	The Best Chart Hits in the World...Ever!
7 November	Huge Hits 1998
14 November	The Annual IV Mixed by Judge Jules & Boy George
21 November	The Annual IV Mixed by Judge Jules & Boy George
28 November	Huge Hits 1998
5 December	Now 41
12 December	Now 41
19 December	Now 41
26 December	Now 41

== Year-end charts ==
=== Best-selling singles ===
Sales between 29 December 1997 and 2 January 1999.

No.	Title	Artist	Peak position	Sales
1	"Believe"	Cher	1	1,519,371
2	"My Heart Will Go On"	Celine Dion	1	1,302,000+
3	"It's Like That"	Run–D.M.C. vs. Jason Nevins	1	1,092,000+
4	"No Matter What"	Boyzone	1	1,074,192
5	"C'est la Vie"	B*Witched	1	
6	"How Do I Live"	LeAnn Rimes	7	700,000+
7	"Chocolate Salty Balls (P.S. I Love You)"	Chef	1	
8	"Goodbye"	Spice Girls	1	679,000+
9	"Ghetto Supastar (That Is What You Are)"	Pras Michel featuring ODB & introducing Mýa	2	
10	"Truly Madly Deeply"	Savage Garden	4	
11	"Music Sounds Better with You"	Stardust	2	
12	"Heartbeat"/"Tragedy"	Steps	2 (Note: Reached number 1 in 1999)	
13	"Viva Forever"	Spice Girls	1	622,000
14	"3 Lions '98"	Baddiel, Skinner & the Lightning Seeds	1	
15	"Doctor Jones"	Aqua	1	
16	"Never Ever"	All Saints	1	
17	"I Don't Want to Miss a Thing"	Aerosmith	4	
18	"The Boy Is Mine"	Brandy & Monica	2	
19	"Feel It"	The Tamperer featuring Maya	1	
20	"Brimful of Asha"	Cornershop	1	
21	"Rollercoaster"	B*Witched	1	
22	"Frozen"	Madonna	1	
23	"Horny '98"	Mousse T. vs. Hot 'N' Juicy	2	
24	"Vindaloo"	Fat Les	2	
25	"Angels"	Robbie Williams	4	
26	"Dance the Night Away"	The Mavericks	4	
27	"Under the Bridge"/"Lady Marmalade"	All Saints	1	
28	"Freak Me"	Another Level	1	
29	"Millennium"	Robbie Williams	1	
30	"To the Moon and Back"	Savage Garden	3	
31	"One for Sorrow"	Steps	2	
32	"Together Again"	Janet Jackson	4	
33	"To You I Belong"	B*Witched	1	
34	"Got the Feelin'"	Five	3	
35	"High"	Lighthouse Family	4	
36	"Finally Found"	Honeyz	4	
37	"Perfect 10"	The Beautiful South	2	
38	"Sex on the Beach"	T-Spoon	2	
39	"Save Tonight"	Eagle-Eye Cherry	6	
40	"I Love the Way You Love Me"	Boyzone	2	
41	"Up and Down"	Vengaboys	4	
42	"You Make Me Wanna..."	Usher	1	
43	"Stop"	Spice Girls	2	332,000
44	"Last Thing on My Mind"	Steps	6	
45	"When You're Gone"	Bryan Adams featuring Melanie C	3	
46	"If You Tolerate This Your Children Will Be Next"	Manic Street Preachers	1	
47	"Mysterious Times"	Sash! featuring Tina Cousins	2	
48	"Because We Want To"	Billie	1	
49	"Girlfriend"	Billie	1	
50	"Turn It Up (Remix)/Fire It Up"	Busta Rhymes	2	

=== Best-selling albums ===
Sales between 29 December 1997 and 2 January 1999.

No.	Title	Artist	Peak position	Sales
1	Talk on Corners	The Corrs	1	1,676,000
2	Ladies & Gentlemen: The Best of George Michael	George Michael	1	1,523,000
3	Where We Belong	Boyzone	1	
4	Life thru a Lens	Robbie Williams	1	1,241,000
5	I've Been Expecting You	Robbie Williams	1	1,093,000
6	Urban Hymns	The Verve	1	1,085,000
7	Ray of Light	Madonna	1	
8	Let's Talk About Love	Celine Dion	1	
9	All Saints	All Saints	2	
10	Titanic: Music from the Motion Picture	James Horner	1	883,000
11	Postcards from Heaven	Lighthouse Family	2	
12	The Best of M People	M People	2	
13	Step One	Steps	2	
14	Quench	The Beautiful South	1	
15	Hits	Phil Collins	1	
16	Savage Garden	Savage Garden	2	
17	One Night Only	Bee Gees	4	
18	The Star and the Wiseman: The Best of Ladysmith Black Mambazo	Ladysmith Black Mambazo	2	623,000
19	Left of the Middle	Natalie Imbruglia	7 (Note: Reached number 5 in 1997)	
20	International Velvet	Catatonia	1	
21	The Best of 1980–1990	U2	4	
22	B*Witched	B*Witched	3	
23	Blue	Simply Red	1	
24	This Is My Truth Tell Me Yours	Manic Street Preachers	1	
25	Five	Five	1	
26	The Best of	James	1	
27	Spiceworld	Spice Girls	2 (Note: Reached number 1 in 1997)	
28	Voice of an Angel	Charlotte Church	4	
29	White on Blonde	Texas	4 (Note: Reached number 1 in 1997)	
30	#1's	Mariah Carey	10	
31	Supposed Former Infatuation Junkie	Alanis Morissette	3	
32	Believe	Cher	8 (Note: Reached number 7 in 1999)	
33	The Best of 1980–1990 & B-Sides	U2	1	
34	Big Willie Style	Will Smith	11	
35	The Masterplan	Oasis	2	
36	Aquarium	Aqua	6	
37	Songs from Ally McBeal	Vonda Shepard	3	
38	Trampoline	The Mavericks	10	
39	Maverick a Strike	Finley Quaye	6 (Note: Reached number 3 in 1997)	
40	Mezzanine	Massive Attack	1	
41	OK Computer	Radiohead	5 (Note: Reached number 1 in 1997)	
42	Honey to the B	Billie	14	
43	Version 2.0	Garbage	1	
44	The Movies	Michael Ball	13	
45	Truly: The Love Songs	Lionel Richie	5	
46	Modern Classics: The Greatest Hits	Paul Weller	7	
47	Jane McDonald	Jane McDonald	1	
48	The Very Best of Meat Loaf	Meat Loaf	14	
49	Up	R.E.M.	2	
50	You've Come a Long Way, Baby	Fatboy Slim	2 (Note: Reached number 1 in 1999)	

=== Best-selling compilation albums ===
Sales between 29 December 1997 and 2 January 1999.

No.	Title	Peak position	Sales
1	Now! 41	1	1,000,000
2	Now! 39	1	670,000
3	Now! 40	1	564,000
4	Fresh Hits '98	1	442,000
5	The Full Monty (Original Soundtrack)	1	425,000
6	Hits '99	2	
7	The Annual IV	1	
8	Chef Aid: The South Park Album	2	
9	Huge Hits 1998	1	
10	New Hits '98	1	

== Groups reformed ==
- Culture Club

== Groups disbanded ==
- Black Grape
- Carter the Unstoppable Sex Machine
- Emerson, Lake & Palmer
- Genesis
- Menswear
- Salad
- Sleeper
- Soul II Soul
- Strangelove
- Swervedriver
- These Animal Men

== Classical music ==
- John Barry – The Beyondness of Things
- Graham Fitkin – Clarinet Concerto
- Matthew King – Gethsemane
- Oliver Knussen – Eccentric Melody
- Gordon McPherson – Miami
- Mark-Anthony Turnage – Evening Songs

== Opera ==
- Gavin Bryars – Doctor Ox's Experiment
- Jonathan Dove – Flight

== Births ==
- 24 March – Isabel Suckling, singer
- 5 June – Dave, rapper, singer and songwriter
- 1 July – Hollie Steel, singer
- 8 August – Ronan Parke, singer
- 11 December – Gabz, Britain's Got Talent singer
- 24 December – Declan McKenna, singer-songwriter

== Deaths ==
- 8 January – Sir Michael Tippett, composer, 95
- 5 February – Nick Webb, jazz musician and composer, 43/44 (pancreatic cancer)
- 20 February – Martindale Sidwell, organist and composer, 81
- 24 February
  - Geoffrey Bush, organist and composer, 77
  - Henny Youngman, British-born American comedian and violinist, 91
- 13 March – Judge Dread, ska and reggae performer, 52, (heart attack on stage)
- 17 March – Bernarr Rainbow, organist and music historian, 83
- 20 March – Ivor Slaney, composer, 76
- 5 April – Cozy Powell, rock drummer, 50 (car crash)
- 14 April – Dorothy Squires, Welsh singer, 83
- 17 April – Linda McCartney, US-born wife of Paul McCartney, businesswoman and member of Wings, 56 (breast cancer)
- 29 April – Harry Lewis, musician and composer, 83
- 5 May – Syd Lawrence, bandleader, 74
- 19 May – Edwin Astley, composer, 76
- 3 July – George Lloyd, composer, 85
- 14 July – Beryl Bryden, jazz and blues singer, 78
- 6 August – Nat Gonella, jazz trumpeter, bandleader and vocalist, 90
- 22 August – Jimmy Skidmore, jazz saxophonist, 82
- 4 September – Lal Waterson, folk singer-songwriter, 55 (cancer)
- 25 October – Dick Higgins, composer, poet, printer and artist, 60 (heart attack)
- 3 December – John Hanson, Canadian-born tenor and West End star, 78
- 7 December – John Addison, film composer, 78
- 8 December – Michael Craze, actor and singer, 56 (heart attack)
- 21 December
  - Avril Coleridge-Taylor, pianist, conductor, and composer, 95
  - Karl Denver, Scottish singer, 67

== Music awards ==
=== BRIT Awards ===
The 1998 BRIT Awards winners were:

- Best British producer: The Verve, Chris Potter and Youth
- Best selling British album act: Spice Girls
- Best soundtrack: "The Full Monty"
- British album: The Verve – "Urban Hymns"
- British breakthrough act: Stereophonics
- British dance act: The Prodigy
- British female solo artist: Shola Ama
- British Group: The Verve
- British male solo artist: Finley Quaye
- British single: All Saints – "Never Ever"
- British Video: All Saints – "Never Ever"
- Freddie Mercury award: Sir Elton John
- International breakthrough act: Eels
- International female: Björk
- International group: U2
- International male: Jon Bon Jovi
- Outstanding contribution: Fleetwood Mac
- Mercury Music Prize – Gomez, Bring It On.
- The Record of the Year – Boyzone – "No Matter What".

== See also ==
- 1998 in British radio
- 1998 in British television
- 1998 in the United Kingdom
- List of British films of 1998
