= Sinéad O'Carroll =

Irish singer

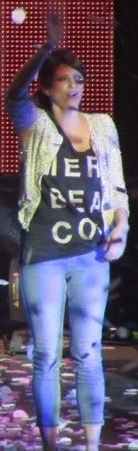
- Sinéad O'Carroll performing in Manchester as part of B*Witched's The Big Reunion arena tour.
- Born: Sinéad Maria O'Carroll; 14 May 1973 (age 53); Dublin, Ireland
- Occupations: Singer; businesswoman
- Years active: 1997–present
- Spouse: Mike Rahman (m. 2006)
- Children: 2

Sinéad Maria O'Carroll (born 14 May 1973) is an Irish singer and businesswoman. She is best known for being a member of the girl group B*Witched.

== Early life ==
Sinéad O'Carroll was born in Dublin to Barbara and Eamonn O'Carroll. She has three siblings: Paul, Elaine, and Ailish.

== Career ==
=== 1998–2002: B*Witched ===
In 1998, Edele Lynch formed the girl group Butterfly Farm with her twin sister Keavy Lynch and O'Carroll. The trio, who later changed their name to B*Witched, began writing and recording together, but soon realised that there was "someone missing". Upon Keavy's suggestion, they asked Lindsay Armaou to come for an audition and she played a tape recording of a song she had written. The other girls liked it, and Lindsay became the fourth member of the band. Although the official B*Witched website gave Sinéad's year of birth as 1978, she later admitted that this was a lie. She was not the only member of the group to lie about her age, however; when the group started out, Lindsay claimed to be 17, despite actually being 19.

B*Witched enjoyed huge success worldwide, becoming the first girl group in history to have their first four singles all go to number one after "C'est la Vie", "Rollercoaster", "To You I Belong" and "Blame It on the Weatherman" all topped the UK Singles Chart. Their self-titled debut album also topped the UK Albums Chart and peaked at number 12 on the US Billboard 200. B*Witched split up in 2002 after being dropped by their record label Sony Music and having sold over 3 million albums worldwide.

=== 2003–2011: Business ===
In 2004, O'Carroll became manager of the girl band Minx, but they failed to sign with a record label. In 2006, she founded The Star Academy, a music school in Dublin with singing and dancing classes for children and teenagers. In 2007, she made a guest in one episode of soap opera Fair City as Sarah, a hotel receptionist.

=== 2012–present: Return with B*Witched ===
On 18 October 2012, it was announced that B*Witched would reunite for an ITV2 series entitled The Big Reunion, along with five other pop groups of their time – 911, Liberty X, Blue, Five and Atomic Kitten. The show would feature each group telling their stories of their times in their respective bands, before rehearsing together ahead of one major comeback performance at the Hammersmith Apollo.

B*Witched had to hold "emotional clear the air" talks before reforming. Edele admitted that "The biggest anxiety about doing this – there's only one, and that's Sinéad." She admitted that she and Sinéad had fallen out in 2006 and had not spoken to each other since. Lindsay also said: "Some of the issues we didn't even know were necessarily there until we were faced with this opportunity that we have to work together again, then we were like, 'Oh, OK, in order for us to do this then we have to sort a few things out.' It all just came up. It's been difficult to get to this point. There's been a lot of talking, a lot of talking. But we're here now. It's very surreal being called B*Witched again because it's been 12 years."

Due to the success of The Big Reunion, the bands embarked on an arena around the UK and Ireland in May 2013. The tour did not initially include Ireland and Northern Ireland, but two extra dates were later added in Dublin and Belfast, marking B*Witched's first performance in their home country in over 10 years. B*Witched joined Five, 911, Atomic Kitten, Honeyz and Liberty X for a "Christmas party tour" in December.

On 3 December 2019, it was announced that O'Carroll would appear on the fourth season of the Irish edition of Dancing with the Stars. O'Carroll and her professional partner, Ryan McShane, were eliminated on 23 February 2020, placing 7th overall.

== Personal life ==
O'Carroll has been married to Mike Rahman since June 2006. They have a son, Zain, and a daughter, Samarah.

She practises reiki and has studied Emotional Freedom Techniques.

== Filmography ==
=== Television ===
Year	Title	Role	Notes
2007	Fair City	Sarah	Episode: "13 June"
2013	The Big Reunion	Herself	
2013	Sooty	Herself	Episode: "Disco Disco!"
2020	Dancing with the Stars	Contestant	Season 4
