= Blame It on the Weatherman =

1999 single by B*Witched

Single by B*Witched

from the album B*Witched
- B-side: "Together We'll Be Fine"
- Released: 15 March 1999
- Length: 3:33
- Label: Epic; Glowworm
- Songwriters: Ray "Madman" Hedges; Martin Brannigan; Tracy Ackerman; Andy Caine
- Producer: Ray "Madman" Hedges

B*Witched singles chronology
| "To You I Belong" (1998) | "Blame It on the Weatherman" (1999) | "Jesse Hold On" (1999) |

"Blame It on the Weatherman" is a song by Irish girl group B*Witched, written by Ray "Madman" Hedges, Martin Brannigan, Tracy Ackerman, and Andy Caine. It was released as the fourth single from their self-titled debut studio album on 15 March 1999.

As with the preceding three singles from the album, "Blame It on the Weatherman" was a hit, and reached No. 1 on the UK Singles Chart; with this, B*Witched became one of the few musical acts to have their first four singles reach the top of the British music charts, a record held (at the time) by the Spice Girls, with six consecutive No. 1 singles—a feat also later achieved by fellow Irish group Westlife. In their home country, the song reached No. 8; in New Zealand, it became the group's first single to miss the top 10, stalling at No. 29. The song was certified silver in the UK, with sales in excess of 200,000.

== Music video ==
The music video was directed by Michael Geoghegan. It features B*Witched floating on a large upside-down articulated lorry through the flooded city of London, picking up numerous floating items from the water and also rescuing a puppy. For the video, the band wore a mixture of their trademark denim and leather, designed by Scott Henshall, who then dressed them for their Royal Variety Performance in 1999.

== Track listings ==
UK CD1

1. "Blame It on the Weatherman" – 3:33
2. "Together We'll Be Fine" – 3:18
3. "Blame It on the Weatherman" (orchestral version) – 3:31

UK CD2

1. "Blame It on the Weatherman" (original) – 3:33
2. "Blame It on the Weatherman" (Amen Club Mix) – 7:10
3. "Blame It on the Weatherman" (Chicane vocal edit) – 5:01

UK cassette single

1. "Blame It on the Weatherman" – 3:33
2. "Blame It on the Weatherman" (orchestral version) – 3:31

European and Australian CD single

1. "Blame It on the Weatherman" – 3:33
2. "Together We'll Be Fine" – 3:18
3. "Blame It on the Weatherman" (Amen Club Mix) – 7:10
4. "Blame It on the Weatherman" (Chicane vocal edit) – 5:01

== Credits and personnel ==
Credits are lifted from the B*Witched album booklet.

Studio

- Produced in Ray "Madman" Hedges' Mothership

Personnel

- Ray "Madman" Hedges – writing, production, arrangement
- Martin Brannigan – writing, arrangement
- Tracy Ackerman – writing
- Andy Caine – writing
- Erwin Keiles – guitar
- Anne Dudley – string arrangement

== Charts ==
=== Weekly charts ===
| Chart (1999) | Peak position |
|---|---|
| Australia (ARIA) | 48 |
| Austria (Ö3 Austria Top 40) | 31 |
| Canada Adult Contemporary (RPM) | 70 |
| Europe (Eurochart Hot 100) | 9 |
| Germany (GfK) | 59 |
| Ireland (IRMA) | 8 |
| New Zealand (Recorded Music NZ) | 29 |
| Scottish Singles Sales (Official Charts) | 2 |
| UK Singles (Official Charts) | 1 |
| UK Airplay (Music Week) | 5 |

=== Year-end charts ===
| Chart (1999) | Position |
|---|---|
| UK Singles (OCC) | 76 |

== Certifications ==
| Region | Certification | Certified units/sales |
|---|---|---|
| United Kingdom (BPI) | Silver | 200,000^{^} |
^{^} Shipments figures based on certification alone.

== Release history ==
| Region | Date | Format(s) | Label(s) | Ref. |
|---|---|---|---|---|
| United Kingdom | 15 March 1999 | CD; cassette | Epic; Glowworm | |
| United States | 10 August 1999 | Contemporary hit radio | Epic; Glowworm | |
| United States | 13 September 1999 | Hot adult contemporary radio | Epic; Glowworm | |
