= B*Witched (album) =

Studio album by B*Witched
- Released: 12 October 1998
- Genres: Pop; dance-pop; teen pop
- Length: 38:44
- Labels: Epic; Glowworm
- Producers: Ray Hedges; Cutfather & Joe

B*Witched chronology
B*Witched (1998)	Awake and Breathe (1999)

Singles from B*Witched
- 1. "C'est la Vie" Released: 25 May 1998; 2. "Rollercoaster" Released: 21 September 1998; 3. "To You I Belong" Released: 7 December 1998; 4. "Blame It on the Weatherman" Released: 15 March 1999

B*Witched is the debut studio album by Irish girl group B*Witched. The album was released on 12 October 1998 under the Epic Records imprint Glowworm Records.

Despite only reaching number three on the UK Albums Chart, the four singles from the album all reached number one on the UK Singles Chart: "C'est la Vie", "Rollercoaster", "To You I Belong" and "Blame It on the Weatherman". The album was released with a limited edition remix album in Australia, and an exclusive bonus track, "Coming Around Again" for Japanese releases.

The album received mostly mixed reviews from critics, one of whom felt that B*Witched were a "junior Spice Girls".

== Singles ==
All four singles from the album performed exceptionally well, all peaking at number one on the UK Singles Chart, and had great success in Ireland, Australia and New Zealand. "C'est la Vie" was also extremely successful in the United States, being released as a separate EP with a number of bonus tracks and remixes. Despite receiving mixed reviews from critics, the song was a huge success for the band after it reached number one on the charts in various countries around the world, including the United Kingdom, Ireland and New Zealand. In the process, B*Witched became the youngest girl group ever to have a UK number one. In the United States, "C'est la Vie" reached number nine on the Billboard Hot 100. In 1999, it was nominated for "Best Song Musically and Lyrically" in the Ivor Novello Awards. The accompanying music video for the song features the four girls dancing around a lush green field full of bright flowers with a puppy as they playfully tease a teenage boy.

"C'est la Vie" debuted at number one on the UK Singles Chart on 31 May 1998 and remained at the top the following week. It also went to number one in the group's home country of Ireland, as well as in New Zealand. The song went to number nine on the US Billboard Hot 100 in the week of 17 April 1999 and number six on the Australian ARIA Singles Chart. It went Platinum in Australia for sales of over 70,000 copies. By September 2017, over 927,000 copies of the single had been sold in the UK. "C'est la Vie" has been featured in numerous films and television shows since its release in 1998, including Smart House (1999), Daria (1999), What Women Want (2000), and Life-Size (2000).

On 21 September 1998, the group released "Rollercoaster" as their second single from the album, following "C'est la Vie" four months earlier. With first-week sales of 157,000, the track debuted at number one on the UK Singles Chart in October 1998 and stayed there for another week. It also reached number one in Australia and New Zealand in November 1998.

"To You I Belong" was released on 7 December 1998, as the third single from their eponymous debut album. It reached number one on the UK Singles Chart in December 1998. It was their third UK chart-topping single.

Like the other three singles from the album, "Blame It on the Weatherman" reached number one on the UK Singles Chart. With this, B*Witched became the first act ever to have their first four singles all debut at number one in the UK (a record since equalled and bettered by fellow Irish band Westlife) and today remain the only girl group to do so. It slightly underperformed in Ireland, reaching number eight, and became the group's first single to miss the top 10 in New Zealand. The song was certified Silver in the UK with sales of 200,000.

== Critical reception ==
Professional ratings
Review scores
Source	Rating
AllMusic	3/5 stars
Robert Christgau	C−
Entertainment Weekly	B+
Rolling Stone	3/5 stars

The album received mostly mixed reviews from music critics. AllMusic's Michael Gallucci said the group were "like a junior Spice Girls" with their "bouncy beats, singalong tunes and chipper attitude". He did, however, say that the singles "C'est la Vie" and "Rollercoaster" "are still able to yield sugary pop morsels fit to chew on for a few minutes." In a positive review, David Browne of Entertainment Weekly gave the album a B+ rating: "With songs that weave in the occasional fiddle or tin whistle, B*witched sound like the Spice Girls' younger sisters aboard the Titanic. Still, it's hard to deny the music's appeal."

Rob Sheffield of Rolling Stone said: "B*Witched is a cheerfully catchy summary of the state of the slumber party – the sound of nice girls acting tough, all in the name of pop." He concluded his review by giving the album three out of five stars. In a negative review, Robert Christgau said that "despite the saucy bits in 'C'est la Vie' (first a 'You show me yours,' then an 'I'll blow you [away]'!), this bid to whiten the Spice Girls is so clean you'll be hard-pressed to remember it's there—unless, like me, you get sick to your stomach at Uilleann hooks, mid-Atlantic brogues, and Enya lite... The obligatory rhythmic recitation, yclept 'Freak Out' and declared 'too hot for hip hop,' has less bottom than Audrey Hepburn and is over in two minutes."

== Commercial performance ==
B*Witched peaked at number three on the UK Albums Chart on the week of release and was certified double platinum the same year. In other territories, the album was also significantly successful. In Australia, the album reached a successful number five, and even peaked at number one in New Zealand.

The album also peaked at number 12 on the US Billboard 200 albums chart and sold enough to be certified platinum in December 1999. This success led B*Witched to record a follow-up, Awake and Breathe, but disappointing sales, coupled with the group being kicked off of Sony Music Entertainment's roster, resulted in B*Witched disbanding in 2002 and remaining inactive for over a decade.

== Track listing ==
No.	Title	Writer(s)	Producer(s)	Length
1.	"Let's Go (The B*Witched Jig)"	Martin Brannigan; Ray Hedges	Hedges	1:24
2.	"C'est la Vie"	Tracy Ackerman; Lindsay Armaou; Brannigan; Hedges; Edele Lynch; Keavy Lynch; Sinéad O'Carroll	Hedges	2:52
3.	"Rev It Up"	Ackerman; Brannigan; Hedges	Hedges	3:58
4.	"To You I Belong"	Armaou; Brannigan; Hedges; E. Lynch; K. Lynch; O'Carroll	Hedges	3:05
5.	"Rollercoaster"	Ackerman; Armaou; Brannigan; Hedges; E. Lynch; K. Lynch; O'Carroll	Hedges; Cutfather & Joe	3:24
6.	"Blame It on the Weatherman"	Ackerman; Brannigan; Andy Caine; Hedges	Hedges	3:33
7.	"We Four Girls"	Brannigan; Hedges	Hedges	3:08
8.	"Castles in the Air"	Armaou; Brannigan; Hedges; E. Lynch; K. Lynch; O'Carroll	Hedges	4:18
9.	"Freak Out"	Ackerman; Brannigan; Hedges	Hedges	2:14
10.	"Like the Rose"	Brannigan; Hedges	Hedges	3:56
11.	"Never Giving Up"	Ackerman	Hedges	3:36
12.	"Oh Mr. Postman"	Brannigan; Hedges	Hedges	3:27

Japanese bonus track
No.	Title	Writer(s)	Producer(s)	Length
13.	"Coming Around Again"	Brannigan; Hedges	Hedges	3:34

Australian limited edition bonus remix disc
No.	Title	Writer(s)	Producer(s)	Length
1.	"C'est la Vie" (K-Klass Epic Club Mix)	Ackerman; Armaou; Brannigan; Hedges; E. Lynch; K. Lynch; O'Carroll	Hedges; K-Klass	7:29
2.	"Rollercoaster" (Silk Uplifting Extended Mix)	Ackerman; Armaou; Brannigan; Hedges; E. Lynch; K. Lynch; O'Carroll	Hedges; Cutfather & Joe; Steve "Silk" Hurley	7:06
3.	"To You I Belong" (Amen 12" Club Mix)	Armaou; Brannigan; Hedges; E. Lynch; K. Lynch; O'Carroll	Hedges; Paul Masterson	8:58
4.	"Blame It on the Weatherman" (Amen Club Mix)	Ackerman; Brannigan; Caine; Hedges	Hedges; Masterson	7:11

UK version
No.	Title	Length
1.	"C'est la Vie"
2.	"Rollercoaster"
3.	"Blame It on the Weatherman"
4.	"Rev It Up"
5.	"Like the Rose"
6.	"To You I Belong"
7.	"Never Giving Up"
8.	"Oh Mr. Postman"
9.	"Freak Out"
10.	"Leaves"
11.	"We Four Girls"
12.	"Together We'll Be Fine"

Asian bonus VCD
No.	Title	Length
1.	"C'est la Vie" (video)	2:52
2.	"To You I Belong" (video)	3:05
3.	"Rollercoaster" (UK video)	3:24
4.	"Rollercoaster" (US video)	3:24
5.	"Blame It on the Weatherman" (video)	3:33

Notes

- ^a signifies remix and additional production

== Personnel ==
Credits adapted from AllMusic and B*Witched's liner notes

- Tracy Ackerman – background vocals
- Lindsay Armaou – background vocals
- Martin Brannigan – guitar
- Andy Caine – background vocals
- Daniel Collier – fiddle
- Richard Cottle – organ
- Snake Davis – tin whistle
- Anne Dudley – string arrangements
- Ray "Madman" Hedges – arranger, producer, vocoder
- Erwin Keiles – guitar
- Edele Lynch – lead vocals
- Keavy Lynch – background vocals
- Sinéad O'Carroll – background vocals

== Charts ==
=== Weekly charts ===
Chart (1998)	Peak position
Australian Albums (ARIA)	5
Canadian Albums (Billboard)	20
Dutch Albums (Album Top 100)	99
European Top 100 Albums (Music & Media)	8
Irish Albums (IRMA)	2
New Zealand Albums (RMNZ)	1
Scottish Albums (Official Charts)	4
UK Albums (Official Charts)	3
US Billboard 200	12

=== Year-end charts ===
Chart (1998)	Position
Australian Albums (ARIA)	30
New Zealand Albums (RMNZ)	23
UK Albums (OCC)	22
Chart (1999)	Position
Australian Albums (ARIA)	43
New Zealand Albums (RMNZ)	41
UK Albums (OCC)	69
US Billboard 200	85

== Certifications ==
Region	Certification	Certified units/sales
Australia (ARIA)	2× Platinum	140,000^{^}
Canada (Music Canada)	Platinum	100,000^{^}
New Zealand (RMNZ)	2× Platinum	30,000^{^}
United Kingdom (BPI)	2× Platinum	728,361
United States (RIAA)	Platinum	1,000,000^{^}
Summaries
Europe (IFPI)	Platinum	1,000,000^{*}
^{*} Sales figures based on certification alone.^{^} Shipments figures based on certification alone.
