= Kim Glover =

English music manager

Kim Glover is an English music manager best known for overseeing the careers of PJ & Duncan (Ant & Dec), B*Witched, New Kids on The Block, Snap, Tiffany, Let Loose and D-Side, as well as helping to manage and develop the careers of Whitney Houston, Aretha Franklin, David Essex and others. She is also Chief executive of Kim Glover Management based in London, which she founded in 1993.

== Career ==
Glover started her career in 1978 at Magnet Records as part of the radio promotions team for Michael Levy (now Lord Levy of Magnet Records) handling artists such as Chris Rea, Matchbox and Bad Manners, where she was soon promoted to Head of TV and Radio. Glover left Magnet records in 1982 to set up her own independent radio and TV promotions company Girl Friday Promotions, where she promoted artists such as The Cult, David Essex, Scritti Politti, Toyah and Meat Loaf among others.

In 1987, Glover was headhunted to join Arista's UK promotion team where she eventually became Head of Radio and TV reporting to Clive Davis, planning and implementing promotion campaigns for the likes of Whitney Houston, Carly Simon, Lisa Stansfield, and the Thompson Twins.

Arista was taken over so Glover re-formed The Girl Friday Promotions Company and one of her first clients was the young American band New Kids on the Block. Dick Scott asked Glover to join him on the New Kids on the Block management team.

In the 1990s, Glover was appointed by Princess Stéphanie of Monaco as she was looking for a manager to help her launch her music career.

One of Glover's most successful acts was PJ and Duncan – now known as Ant & Dec. They were co-managed by Glover together with their agent from Newcastle for four years under her company Real Red. They had a number of hits including the eponymous Let's Get Ready to Rhumble. Glover was referred to in their autobiography as being the only one to have ever seen the boys have an argument – in a lift. Glover met Ant & Dec through one of her artists Richie Wermerling of Let Loose who wrote some of the music on Byker Grove.

In later years, Glover managed many other groups including B*Witched, Let Loose, and D-Side.

In 2013, Glover teamed up with Gareth Russell and together they formed Kim Glover entertainment.
