= C'est la Vie (B*Witched song) =

1998 single by B*Witched

Single by B*Witched

from the album B*Witched
- B-side: "We Four Girls"
- Released: 25 May 1998
- Genre: Pop
- Length: 2:52
- Label: Epic; Glowworm
- Songwriters: B*Witched; Ray "Madman" Hedges; Martin Brannigan; Tracy Ackerman
- Producer: Ray "Madman" Hedges

B*Witched singles chronology
"C'est la Vie" (1998)	"Rollercoaster" (1998)

Music video
- "C'est la Vie" on YouTube

"C'est la Vie" is a pop song by Irish girl group B*Witched. It served as their debut single and the lead single from their self-titled debut studio album (1998). Written by band members Edele Lynch, Keavy Lynch, Lindsay Armaou, and Sinéad O'Carroll, Ray "Madman" Hedges, Martin Brannigan and Tracy Ackerman, it was released by Epic and Glowworm Records on 25 May 1998.

The song reached number one on the charts in various countries around the world, including the United Kingdom, Ireland and New Zealand. In the process, B*Witched became the youngest girl group ever to have a UK number one. In the United States, "C'est la Vie" reached number nine on the Billboard Hot 100. In 1999, it was nominated for "Best Song Musically and Lyrically" in the Ivor Novello Awards. The accompanying music video for the song features the four girls dancing around a lush green field full of bright flowers with a puppy as they playfully tease a teenage boy.

== Background and release ==
"C'est la Vie" was written by B*Witched, Ray "Madman" Hedges, Martin Brannigan, and Tracy Ackerman. The song features many cheeky double entendres; the group commented in 2013 that "it went over children's heads, but the parents got the innuendos. It was perfect for everyone."

== Critical reception ==
Chuck Taylor of Billboard wrote, "It's catchy as all get-out, has a chorus that lingers like poison ivy, and adds unlimited spoonfuls of zip spin after spin". Taylor considered that the song would be successful in the United States, but that recent trends had turned against uptempo pop music. He recommended the song and the album to fans of Britney Spears or Cleopatra. In 1999, the song was nominated for "Best Song Musically and Lyrically" at the Ivor Novello Awards. Billboard named the song number 97 on their list of 100 Greatest Girl Group Songs of All Time.

== Chart performance ==
"C'est la Vie" debuted at number one on the UK Singles Chart on 31 May 1998 and remained at the top the following week. It also went to number one in the group's home country of Ireland, as well as in New Zealand. The song went to number nine on the US Billboard Hot 100 in the week of 17 April 1999 and number six on the Australian ARIA Singles Chart. It went Platinum in Australia for sales of more than 70,000 copies. By May 2024, more than 1,500,000 copies of the single had been sold in the UK.

== Music video ==
The music video for the song was filmed in April 1998 and directed by Alison Murray, who later also directed the UK video for "Rollercoaster". It begins with the four girls lying on the ground in a field of daisies on a sunny day. A dog is introduced into the clip next to one of the girls and the quartet then begin dancing and singing to a teenage boy in a treehouse. The girls then tie the boy to a tree and the dog chases toward him before he is bombarded with lipstick kiss marks all over his face. The boy is freed from the tree and the girls hose him with water and begin performing an Irish reel before lying back down in the field where they began.

== Track listings ==
UK CD1

1. "C'est la Vie" – 2:52
2. "We Four Girls" – 1:52
3. "B*Witched Quiz Show" – 2:26

UK CD2 and Australian CD single

1. "C'est la Vie" – 2:52
2. "C'est la Vie" (K-Klass Epic Klub remix) – 7:25
3. "C'est la Vie" (Skynet Glass Palace vocal mix) – 8:02
4. "C'est la Vie" (Dog in the River mix) – 6:45

UK cassette single and European CD single

1. "C'est la Vie" – 2:52
2. "We Four Girls" – 1:52

US 7-inch single

A. "C'est la Vie" – 2:52
B. "Get Happy" – 3:04

US maxi-CD single

1. "C'est la Vie" – 2:52
2. "Get Happy" – 3:04
3. "C'est la Vie" (K-Klass Epic Klub remix) – 7:25
4. "C'est la Vie" (Skynet Glass Palace vocal mix) – 8:02
5. "C'est la Vie" (Dog in the River mix) – 6:45
6. "B*Witched Quiz Show" – 2:26
7. "Snippets" ("We Four Girls", "Rollercoaster", "To You I Belong") – 1:35

Japanese CD single

1. "C'est la Vie" – 2:53
2. "C'est la Vie" (K-Klass Epic Klub remix) – 7:29
3. "C'est la Vie" (Skynet Glass Palace vocal mix) – 8:02
4. "We Four Girls" – 1:53
5. "B*Witched Quiz Show" – 2:24

== Credits and personnel ==
Credits are lifted from the B*Witched album booklet.

Studio

- Produced in Ray "Madman" Hedges' Mothership

Personnel

- B*Witched – writing, vocals
- Ray "Madman" Hedges – writing, production, arrangement
- Martin Brannigan – writing, arrangement
- Tracy Ackerman – writing
- Erwin Keiles – guitar
- Daniel Collier – fiddle

== Charts ==
=== Weekly charts ===
Chart (1998–1999)	Peak position
Australia (ARIA)	6
Austria (Ö3 Austria Top 40)	23
Belgium (Ultratop 50 Flanders)	2
Belgium (Ultratop 50 Wallonia)	13
Canada Top Singles (RPM)	50
Estonia (Eesti Top 20)	2
Europe (Eurochart Hot 100)	6
France (SNEP)	48
Germany (GfK)	64
Hungary (Mahasz)	7
Iceland (Íslenski Listinn Topp 40)	19
Ireland (IRMA)	1
Netherlands (Dutch Top 40)	8
Netherlands (Single Top 100)	11
New Zealand (Recorded Music NZ)	1
Norway (VG-lista)	9
Scottish Singles Sales (Official Charts)	1
Sweden (Sverigetopplistan)	11
UK Singles (Official Charts)	1
UK Airplay (Music Week)	5
US Billboard Hot 100	9
US Dance Singles Sales (Billboard)	11
US Hot Latin Songs (Billboard)	32
US Pop Airplay (Billboard)	22

=== Year-end charts ===
Chart (1998)	Position
Australia (ARIA)	26
Belgium (Ultratop 50 Flanders)	42
Belgium (Ultratop 50 Wallonia)	70
Europe (Eurochart Hot 100)	45
Netherlands (Dutch Top 40)	55
Netherlands (Single Top 100)	63
New Zealand (RIANZ)	5
Sweden (Hitlistan)	53
UK Singles (OCC)	5

Chart (1999)	Position
US Mainstream Top 40 (Billboard)	87
US Maxi-Singles Sales (Billboard)	40

== Certifications ==
Region	Certification	Certified units/sales
Australia (ARIA)	Platinum	70,000^{^}
Belgium (BRMA)	Gold	25,000^{*}
New Zealand (RMNZ)	Gold	15,000^{‡}
Sweden (GLF)	Gold	15,000^{^}
United Kingdom (BPI)	2× Platinum	1,500,000
United States (RIAA)	Gold	700,000
^{*} Sales figures based on certification alone.^{^} Shipments figures based on certification alone.^{‡} Sales+streaming figures based on certification alone.

== Release history ==
Region	Date	Format(s)	Label(s)	Ref.
United Kingdom	25 May 1998	CD; cassette	Epic; Glowworm	
Japan	26 August 1998	CD	Epic	
United States	15 December 1998	CD	Epic; Glowworm	
United States	12 January 1999	Contemporary hit radio	Epic; Glowworm	
