= Rollercoaster (B*Witched song) =

1998 single by B*Witched

Single by B*Witched

from the album B*Witched
- B-side: "Get Happy"; "B*Witched Go to the Moon"
- Released: 21 September 1998
- Length: 3:24
- Label: Epic; Glowworm
- Songwriters: B*Witched; Ray "Madman" Hedges; Martin Brannigan; Tracy Ackerman
- Producer: Ray Hedges

B*Witched singles chronology
| "C'est la Vie" (1998) | "Rollercoaster" (1998) | "To You I Belong" (1998) |

Music videos
- "Rollercoaster" on YouTube
- "Rollercoaster" (US version) on YouTube

"Rollercoaster" is a song recorded by Irish pop girl group B*Witched for their debut album, B*Witched (1998). It was written by B*Witched along with Ray "Madman" Hedges, Martin Brannigan, and Tracy Ackerman. Production helmed by Hedges while addition production was provided by Cutfather & Joe.

On 21 September 1998, the group released "Rollercoaster" as their second single from the album, following "C'est la Vie" four months earlier. With first-week sales of 157,000, the track debuted at number one on the UK Singles Chart in October 1998 and stayed there for another week. It also reached number one in Australia and New Zealand in November 1998.

== Music video ==
The group made a video for the song, with intertwining shots featuring all four girls traveling through space or dancing in front of, and on, a roller coaster and boxing a strongman on a fair's boxing booth. A second version music video was filmed at Venice Beach, California.

== Track listings ==
UK CD1; European CD2; Japanese CD single
| No. | Title | Length |
|---|---|---|
| 1. | "Rollercoaster" | 3:24 |
| 2. | "Get Happy" | 3:04 |
| 3. | "B*Witched Go to the Moon" | 1:52 |
| 4. | "Video Message" |
| 5. | "Rollercoaster" (full length video) | 3:24 |

UK CD2
| No. | Title | Length |
|---|---|---|
| 1. | "Rollercoaster" | 3:23 |
| 2. | "Rollercoaster" (Amen UK full vocal mix) | 8:09 |
| 3. | "Rollercoaster" (Silk's uplifting extended mix) | 7:06 |

UK cassette single and European CD1
| No. | Title | Length |
|---|---|---|
| 1. | "Rollercoaster" | 3:24 |
| 2. | "Get Happy" | 3:04 |

Australian CD single
| No. | Title | Length |
|---|---|---|
| 1. | "Rollercoaster" | 3:24 |
| 2. | "C'est la Vie" | 2:53 |
| 3. | "Get Happy" | 3:04 |

US CD single
| No. | Title | Length |
|---|---|---|
| 1. | "Rollercoaster" | 3:24 |
| 2. | "Together We'll Be Fine" | 3:18 |
| 3. | "C'est la Vie" (remix edit) | 3:12 |
| 4. | "B*Witched Go to the Moon" | 1:52 |
| 5. | "B*Witched Megamix" (short version) | 3:59 |

== Credits and personnel ==
Credits are lifted from the B*Witched album booklet.

Studios

- Produced in Ray "Madman" Hedges' Mothership
- Mix engineered at Medley Studio (Copenhagen, Denmark)

Personnel

- B*Witched – writing
- Ray "Madman" Hedges – writing, production, arrangement
- Martin Brannigan – writing, arrangement
- Tracy Ackerman – writing
- Erwin Keiles – guitar
- Daniel Collier – fiddle
- Cutfather & Joe – additional production and remix
- Mads Nilsson – mix engineering

== Charts ==
=== Weekly charts ===
| Chart (1998–1999) | Peak position |
|---|---|
| Australia (ARIA) | 1 |
| Belgium (Ultratip Bubbling Under Flanders) | 5 |
| Canada Adult Contemporary (RPM) | 67 |
| Europe (Eurochart Hot 100) | 7 |
| Iceland (Íslenski Listinn Topp 40) | 32 |
| Ireland (IRMA) | 2 |
| Netherlands (Dutch Top 40 Tipparade) | 3 |
| Netherlands (Single Top 100) | 55 |
| New Zealand (Recorded Music NZ) | 1 |
| Norway (VG-lista) | 20 |
| Scottish Singles Sales (Official Charts) | 1 |
| Sweden (Sverigetopplistan) | 16 |
| UK Singles (Official Charts) | 1 |
| UK Airplay (Music Week) | 11 |
| US Billboard Hot 100 | 67 |
| US Dance Singles Sales (Billboard) | 25 |

=== Year-end charts ===
| Chart (1998) | Position |
|---|---|
| Australia (ARIA) | 21 |
| Europe (Eurochart Hot 100) | 100 |
| New Zealand (RIANZ) | 12 |
| UK Singles (OCC) | 21 |

== Certifications ==
| Region | Certification | Certified units/sales |
|---|---|---|
| Australia (ARIA) | Platinum | 70,000^{^} |
| New Zealand (RMNZ) | Platinum | 10,000^{*} |
| United Kingdom (BPI) | Gold | 400,000^{^} |
^{*} Sales figures based on certification alone.^{^} Shipments figures based on certification alone.

== Release history ==
| Region | Date | Format(s) | Label(s) | Ref. |
|---|---|---|---|---|
| United Kingdom | 21 September 1998 | CD; cassette | Epic; Glowworm | |
| Japan | 31 October 1998 | CD | Epic | |
