= B*Witched =

Irish girl group

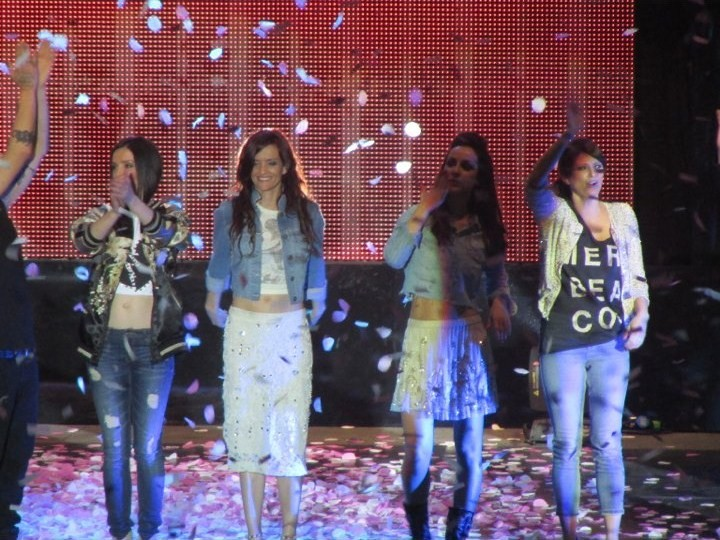
- B*Witched performing in Manchester as part of The Big Reunion arena tour. From the left, Edele Lynch, Keavy Lynch, Lindsay Armaou and Sinéad O'Carroll

Background information
- Origin: Dublin, Ireland
- Genres: Pop; dance-pop
- Years active: 1997–2002; 2012–present
- Labels: Epic; Glowworm; PledgeMusic
- Spinoffs: Barbarellas
- Members: Edele Lynch; Keavy Lynch; Lindsay Armaou; Sinéad O'Carroll

B*Witched are an Irish girl group consisting of twin sisters Edele and Keavy Lynch, Lindsay Armaou and Sinéad O'Carroll. Originally active between 1997 and 2002, they enjoyed success in both Europe and North America between 1998 and 2002, releasing two albums and eight singles, all of which made the UK Top 20. Their first four singles, "C'est la Vie", "Rollercoaster", "To You I Belong" and "Blame It on the Weatherman", all reached number one in the UK Singles Chart and the group has sold over 3 million albums worldwide.

On 18 October 2012, it was announced that B*Witched would reunite for the ITV2 reality-documentary series The Big Reunion in 2013, along with other pop groups of their time. Due to the success, the groups embarked on an arena tour around the UK and Ireland in May 2013. In May 2013, B*Witched unveiled a new song called "Love and Money" which served as the group's lead single from their 2014 EP, Champagne or Guinness. In 2023, B*Witched released the single "Birthday" to celebrate their 25th anniversary.

== Career ==
=== 1996–1998: Formation and B*Witched ===
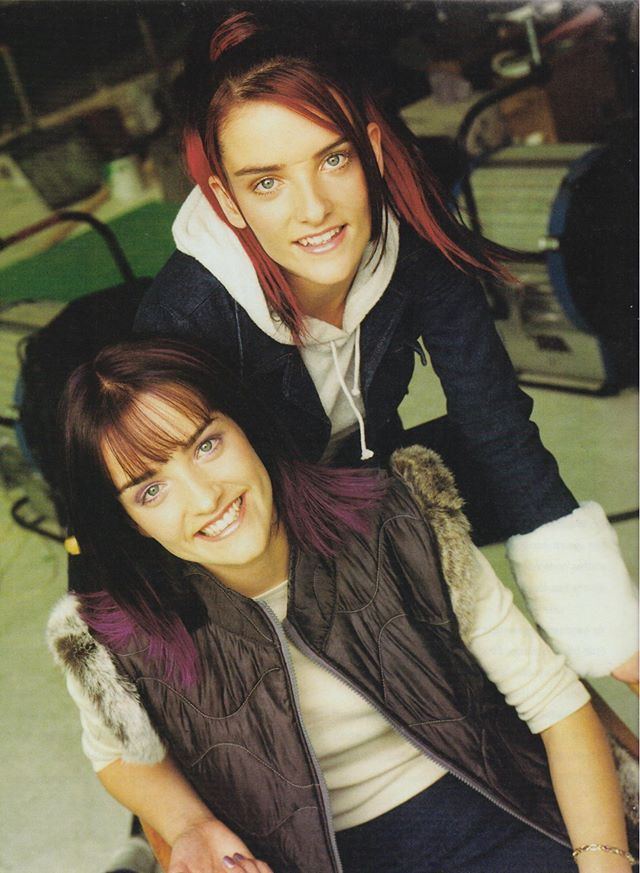
Edele and Keavy Lynch in 1998

All four members of B*Witched knew each other vaguely from dancing at Digges Lane dance studios in Dublin. Sinéad O'Carroll met Keavy Lynch in a garage in the Dublin suburb of Finglas, where Keavy was working as a part-time mechanic. The two of them became friends after talking about music and the idea of being in a band. Lindsay Armaou met Keavy at a kickboxing class. In 1996, Keavy, Sinéad, and Keavy's twin sister Edele decided to put a group together, originally called Butterfly Farm. They later became a four-piece when Armaou joined.

The group initially used the name Sister, before settling on B*Witched. The band members deliberately cultivated a tomboy image and, in order to appeal to a younger audience, understated their ages in their early years. Edele and Keavy's older brother Shane Lynch (of the band Boyzone) helped the group find a manager, Kim Glover, who signed the group to Glowworm Records, the Epic Records label she ran, in 1997. The label's co-head, Ray "Madman" Hedges, produced all of B*Witched's releases. The group's first ever gig was in Thompsons Garage in Belfast, during which their microphones did not work. The group's management insisted on making Edele the lead singer of the group, which was a source of tension among the other members who felt sidelined and undervalued. Keavy said that her feelings of being overshadowed by her sister within the group, along with the pressures of the music industry, quickly took a toll on her mental health.

B*Witched released their debut single "C'est la Vie" on 25 May 1998. It reached number one on the UK Singles Chart, making B*Witched the youngest girl group to have a number one in the UK (a feat that has since been surpassed by the Sugababes and Little Mix). Following its release in the United States, the song went to number nine on the Billboard Hot 100. Subsequent singles "Rollercoaster", "To You I Belong" and "Blame It on the Weatherman" also topped the UK chart. They also performed the theme song for the Saturday morning cartoon Sabrina: The Animated Series. Their self-titled debut album, released in October 1998, reached number three on the UK Albums Chart and was certified 2× Platinum in the UK. The album also peaked at number 12 on the US Billboard 200 and was certified Platinum in the US.

=== 1999–2002: Awake and Breathe, O'Carroll's departure and break up ===
In 1999, B*Witched appeared on the ABBA tribute single "Thank ABBA for the Music", which reached number four in the UK, and recorded a cover of "Does Your Mother Know" for the subsequent ABBAmania album and TV special. Singing dolls of the group were made by Yaboom Toys in 1999. Along with Britney Spears, they performed the opening act for NSYNC's world tour NSYNC in Concert. B*Witched's second album, Awake and Breathe, released a year after their debut, peaked at number 5 on the charts and was certified Platinum. Singles from the album were less successful than earlier releases ("Jesse Hold On" reached number 4, "I Shall Be There" number 13 and "Jump Down" number 16 in the UK). After touring Europe and America, where they co-headlined the All That Music and More Festival with LFO and Blaque, the band began work on a third album. Three new songs were recorded: "Hold On" (featured in The Princess Diaries); a cover of Toni Basil's "Mickey" (featured in Bring It On); and a cover of Wild Cherry's "Play That Funky Music". The latter two appeared on their new American EP, Across America 2000, along with live tracks and the earlier cover of "Does Your Mother Know".

In 2001, the group had chosen "Where Will You Go?" as the lead single from their third studio album. On 4 July 2001, B*Witched made a guest appearance on the United States daytime television medical drama, General Hospital. In October, before the group could film a music video for "Where Will You Go?", the girls received a phone call from their manager telling them their record label Sony had dropped them. In June 2002, after one year without signing a new record deal, O'Carroll left the band, unhappy with the forced hiatus. In September 2002 the group split.

=== 2012–present: Return, Champagne or Guinness and touring ===
On 18 October 2012, it was announced that B*Witched would reunite for the ITV2 series The Big Reunion along with five other pop groups of their time—Honeyz, 911, Liberty X, Five and Atomic Kitten (Blue later joined as well). The show featured each group telling their stories of their times in their respective bands, before rehearsing together ahead of one major comeback performance at the Hammersmith Apollo. B*Witched had to hold "emotional clear the air" talks before reforming. Edele admitted that she and Sinéad had fallen out in 2006 and had not spoken to each other since: "My biggest anxiety about doing this – there's only one, and it's Sinéad, I think. It's just how I'm going to feel about being in her person again." Lindsay also said: "Some of the issues we didn't even know were necessarily there until we were faced with this opportunity that we have to work together again, then we were like, 'Oh, OK, in order for us to do this then we have to sort a few things out.' It all just came up. It's been difficult to get to this point. There's been a lot of talking, a lot of talking. But we're here now. It's very surreal being called B*Witched again because it's been 12 years."

Due to the success of The Big Reunion, the bands embarked on an arena tour around the UK and Ireland in May 2013. The groups got together to record a charity single, a cover of Wizzard's "I Wish It Could Be Christmas Everyday", for Text Santa. In March, Armaou announced that they would record new material. On 4 May, the group released a promotional single called "Love and Money" on YouTube. On 3 October, Edele Lynch announced in an interview to Today FM that they were recording their third album. On 11 December, B*Witched made an announcement via PledgeMusic. The EP, titled Champagne or Guinness, was released on 28 September 2014. On 12 February 2016, B*Witched released the compilation album C'est la Vie – The Collection, a 36-track double album featuring tracks from their first two albums and two tracks from their 2014 Champagne or Guinness EP. B*Witched had planned to tour Australia in 2017, along with other acts including Atomic Kitten and Liberty X.

In October 2019, the band returned with a brand new single, "Hold On", a cover of the U.S. number-one hit of the same name by Wilson Phillips.

In March 2021, B*Witched started hosting a new podcast called Starting Over with B*Witched.

In March 2023, the group released the single "Birthday" to celebrate their 25th anniversary, stating: "We will get to the point of an album. Right now we're releasing singles, but the singles will keep coming and eventually they'll be on the album [...] there's definitely more in the pipeline". In August 2024, the group released an EP, Ripped Jeans, containing three new tracks: "So into You", "Multiply", "My Greatest Little Mistake", as well as "Birthday".

In February 2026, they performed "C'est la Vie" on Michael McIntyre's Big Show. That same month, it was announced they would serve as supporting act for Blue's 25th Anniversary Tour, and for Boyzone as part of their "Two for the Road" event at London's Emirates Stadium. They will support the 6 June concert.

== Awards and nominations ==
Award	Year	Nominee(s)	Category	Result	Ref.
BMI London Awards	2000	"C'est la Vie"	Pop Award	Won	
MTV Europe Music Awards	1998	Themselves	MTV Select — UK and Ireland	Nominated	

== Members ==
- Lindsay Armaou – vocals
- Edele Lynch – vocals
- Keavy Lynch – vocals
- Sinéad O'Carroll – vocals

== Discography ==
- B*Witched (1998)
- Awake and Breathe (1999)

== Concert tours ==
Headlining

- Jump Up Jump Down Tour (1999)
- All That Music & More Tour (1999–2000)
- B*Witched Live (2014–2019; 2021–2022)
- 25th Anniversary Tour (2023–present)

Co-headlining

- The Big Reunion (2013)
