= To You I Belong =

1998 single by B*Witched

Single by B*Witched

from the album B*Witched
- B-side: "Fly Away", "B*Witched's Message to Santa"
- Released: 7 December 1998
- Length: 3:05
- Label: Epic, Glowworm
- Songwriters: B*Witched, Ray "Madman" Hedges, Martin Brannigan
- Producer: Ray "Madman" Hedges

B*Witched singles chronology
"Rollercoaster" (1998)	"To You I Belong" (1998)	"Blame It on the Weatherman" (1999)

"To You I Belong" is a song by Irish girl group B*Witched. Written by the band, Ray "Madman" Hedges, and Martin Brannigan, it was released as the third single from their self-titled debut album (1998) on 7 December 1998. It reached number one on the UK Singles Chart the same month, giving the group their third consecutive UK chart-topper.

== Critical reception ==
Claudia Connell from News of the World wrote, "Like C'est La Vie, this follow-up ballad has a distinctly Irish flavour which lets the girls display their considerable vocal talents." She added, "Yes, this could even knock Cher off the top!".

== Music video ==
The accompanying music video for "To You I Belong" was directed by Katie Bell, who would later also direct the video for "I Shall Be There". Like the song itself, the video has a Christmas feel to it: it features a cold, icy forest and a large lake.

== Live performances ==
During performances, lead singer Edele Lynch occasionally wore finger cymbals with which she would clap in-time with the cymbals in the music. The song has a distinctly "Irish" or "Celtic"-pop ballad feel, featuring a tin whistle intro, bridge, and riffs throughout; whistle was played on the album and live by Chris "Snake" Davis.

== Track listings ==
- UK CD1
1. "To You I Belong"
2. "Fly Away"
3. "B*Witched's Message to Santa"
- UK CD2
1. "To You I Belong"
2. "To You I Belong" (Amen UK 12-inch mix)
3. "To You I Belong" (The Wide Slam mix)
- UK cassette single
1. "To You I Belong"
2. "B*Witched's Message to Santa"
- European CD single
1. "To You I Belong"
2. "Fly Away"
- Australian CD single
1. "To You I Belong"
2. "To You I Belong" (Amen UK 12-inch mix)
3. "To You I Belong" (The Wide Slam mix)
4. "Fly Away"
5. "Rollercoaster" (Amen mix)

== Credits and personnel ==
Credits are lifted from the B*Witched album booklet.

Studio

- Produced in Ray "Madman" Hedges' Mothership

Personnel

- B*Witched – writing
- Ray "Madman" Hedges – writing, production, arrangement
- Martin Brannigan – writing, arrangement
- Erwin Keiles – guitar
- Daniel Collier – fiddle
- Chris "Snake" Davis – tin whistle

== Charts ==
=== Weekly charts ===
Chart (1998–1999)	Peak position
Australia (ARIA)	25
Belgium (Ultratip Bubbling Under Flanders)	13
Europe (Eurochart Hot 100)	7
Ireland (IRMA)	4
Netherlands (Dutch Top 40 Tipparade)	17
Netherlands (Single Top 100)	82
New Zealand (Recorded Music NZ)	5
Scotland Singles (OCC)	1
Sweden (Sverigetopplistan)	42
UK Singles (OCC)	1
UK Airplay (Music Week)	7

=== Year-end charts ===
Chart (1998)	Position
UK Singles (OCC)	33

== Certifications ==
Region	Certification	Certified units/sales
United Kingdom (BPI)	Gold	400,000^{^}
^{^} Shipments figures based on certification alone.
