= Ray Hedges =

British composer

Ray "Madman" Hedges is an English songwriter and record producer from Surrey, England who has had over 60 top 20 singles and albums including seven UK number-ones as producer and or writer with many on his own record labels.

== Career ==
Hedges has been nominated for two Ivor Novello Awards and awarded Producer of the Year.

He has worked with a diverse selection of artists including S Club, The Struts, Westlife, Boyzone, B*Witched, Towers of London, Chicane, Lil' Chris, Take That, Bryan Adams, Maxi Jazz from Faithless, Big Brovaz, Cher, Clannad, Tom Jones, Daniel Bedingfield, Boy George, Ronan Keating, Emma Bunton, Ant and Dec, Dizzee Rascal and James Corden.
