= List of awards and nominations received by Madonna =

Madonna awards and nominations
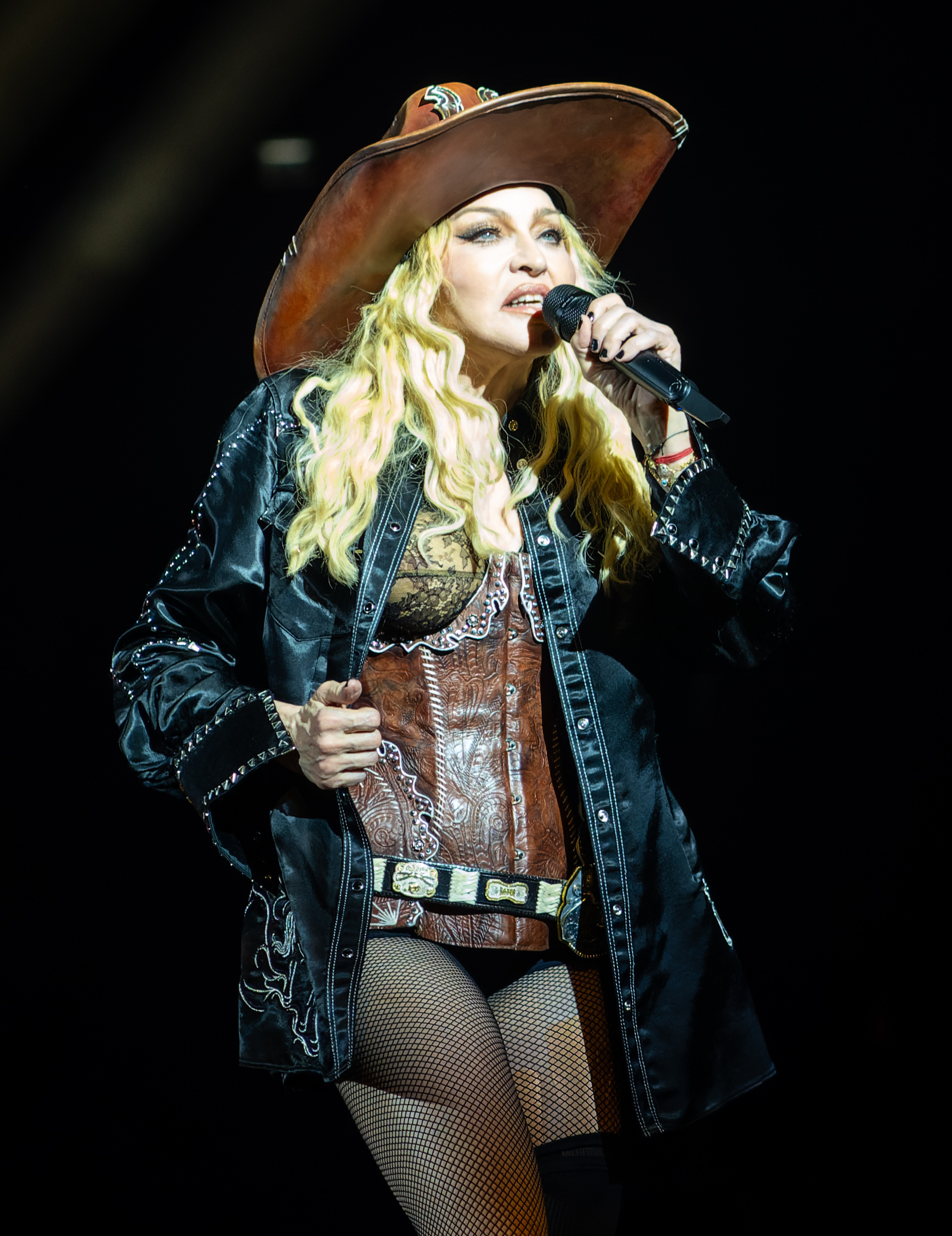
- Madonna in 2023
Awards and nominations
Award	Wins	Nominations
American Music Awards	3	19
ASCAP Pop Awards	24	24
Billboard Music Awards	5	6
Billboard Touring Awards	4	8
Brit Awards	2	12
Echo Awards	3	7
Golden Globe Awards	2	7
Grammy Awards	7	32
Ivor Novello Awards	2	5
Japan Gold Disc Awards	17	17
Juno Awards	2	8
MTV Europe Music Awards	4	19
MTV Video Music Awards	27	84
NRJ Music Awards	4	11
Pollstar Awards	2	15

Totals (Note: Certain award groups do not simply award one winner. They acknowledge several different recipients, have runners-up, and have third place. Since this is a specific recognition and is different from losing an award, runner-up mentions are considered wins in this award tally. For simplification and to avoid errors, each award in this list has been presumed to have had a prior nomination.)
- Wins: 512
- Nominations: 993

Madonna is an American singer, songwriter, and actress, who has received many accolades. Her first nomination from a major award ceremony was Best New Artist at the 1984 MTV Video Music Awards (VMA) for "Borderline" from her debut album Madonna (1983). "Lucky Star", which she single-handedly wrote for the album, earned Madonna her first songwriting honor from the American Society of Composers, Authors and Publishers (ASCAP). Due to the success of her second album, Like a Virgin (1984), she won seven categories at the 1985 Billboard Number One Awards, including Top Pop Artist of the Year. The 1985 soundtrack single "Crazy for You" gave Madonna her first Grammy nomination. Madonna received many accolades at the international level after the release of her third album, True Blue (1986), including Artist of the Year and Grand Prix Album of the Year at the Japan Gold Disc Awards as well as International Album of the Year at Canada's Juno Awards. At the 1986 VMAs, she become the first woman to receive the Video Vanguard Award.

Madonna continued winning the VMA trophies with her critically acclaimed album, Like a Prayer (1989), but it was snubbed at the Grammy Awards. By the end of the 1980s, Madonna was named the Artist of the Decade by several media such as MTV, Billboard, and Musician magazine. In 1990, the Hollywood Walk of Fame committee decided to award Madonna with a star on the Hollywood Boulevard sidewalk, but she turned down the nomination. The Blond Ambition World Tour won the award for Most Creative Stage Production at the 1990 Pollstar Awards. Madonna also won her first Grammy Award in the category of Best Long Form Music Video, for the video release of the tour. In 1998, Madonna released Ray of Light, which earned her three Grammy trophies as well as nominations for Album of the Year and Record of the Year. At the 1998 VMAs, Madonna won six categories, including Video of the Year. In 1999, "Beautiful Stranger" gave Madonna her 20th VMA win, more than any other artist in history until Beyoncé surpassed the record in 2016.

Madonna won her first Brit Award for International Female Solo Artist following the release of her eighth studio album, Music (2000). She received the same award after the release of Confessions on a Dance Floor (2005), which also earned her the Grammy Award for Best Electronic/Dance Album. Madonna won her seventh Grammy Award for The Confessions Tour (2007). During the 2000s, Madonna was honored four times at the Billboard Touring Awards, including Top Tour twice, for the 2004 Re-Invention World Tour and the 2009 leg of the Sticky & Sweet Tour. In 2026, she tied the VMAs record for the most nominations for an artist in a single year. Her lengthy career achievement was also acknowledged by France's NRJ Awards in 2004 and the MTV TRL Awards in 2006. She was inducted into the UK Music Hall of Fame in 2004 (as one of its five founding members) and the Rock and Roll Hall of Fame in 2008 (her first year of eligibility).

Outside of her works in music, Madonna has been nominated for the Saturn Award for Best Actress for her role in Dick Tracy (1990) and won the Golden Globe Award for Best Actress in a Musical or Comedy for starring in Evita (1996). However, she has also received mocking awards for her films, including nine Golden Raspberry Awards. Madonna was honored for her charitable works in helping cure AIDS, by the AIDS Project Los Angeles (APLA) in 1990 and American Foundation for AIDS Research (AmfAR) in 1991. Her documentary film I Am Because We Are (2008) received the VH1 Do Something! Award for bringing forward a social issue. At the 2019 GLAAD Media Awards, Madonna received the special honor of Advocate for Change. Madonna also won a number of accolades for her fashion, including five awards from the VH1 Fashion Awards as well as the Style Icon Award from the 2007 Elle Style Awards.

== Awards and nominations ==
Award/organization (Note: Charts are not included, unless they are explicitly described as "awards" or specific trophies are given.)	Year	Nominee/work	Category	Result	Ref.
2Day FM (Australia)	1999	Madonna	Female Artist of the Millennium	Honoree	
4Music Video Honours	2012	"Give Me All Your Luvin'"	Best Video of the Year	Nominated	
Advanced Imaging Society (Note: Presented as Lumiere Awards)	2019	Madonna (with Maluma)	Best use of AR in Live Broadcast (2019 Billboard Music Awards)	Won	
Adweek's Maddy Awards	2002	Madonna in BMW	Best Celebrity Performance (Reader's Choice)	Nominated	
AIDS Project Los Angeles	1990	Madonna	APLA Commitment to Life Award	Honoree	
Alarmprisen Awards	2001	"Music"	Best International Song	2nd place	
Alive and Well	1990	Madonna	For promoting vegetarian good health	Honoree	
Allure Best of Beauty Awards	2019	MDNA Skin: The Beauty Roller	The Best Splurges	Won	
Amadeus Austrian Music Awards	2001	Madonna	International Pop/Rock Act	Nominated	
Amadeus Austrian Music Awards	2006	"Hung Up"	International Single of the Year	Won	
Amadeus Austrian Music Awards	2006	Confessions on a Dance Floor	International Album of the Year	Nominated	
American Dance Music Awards (Note: Also known as DanceStar Awards USA, founded by Andy Ruffell, developer of MOBO Awards. It was televised on some MTV networks.)	2002	Madonna	Best Chart Act	Nominated	
American Dance Music Awards	2003	Madonna	Best Chart Act	Nominated	
American Dance Music Awards	2003	"Die Another Day" (Deepsky remix)	FM Best Remix	Nominated	
American Dance Music Awards	2004	Madonna	Best Chart Act	Won	
American Foundation for AIDS Research	1991	Madonna	Award of Courage	Honoree	
American Image Awards	1999	Madonna	Hottest Female Celebrities	Nominated	
American Moviegoers Awards	1997	Madonna in Evita	Best Actress	Won	
American Music Awards	1985	Madonna	Favorite Pop/Rock Female Artist	Nominated	
American Music Awards	1986	Madonna	Favorite Pop/Rock Female Artist	Nominated	
American Music Awards	1986	Madonna	Favorite Pop/Rock Female Video Artist	Nominated	
American Music Awards	1986	Like a Virgin	Favorite Pop/Rock Album	Nominated	
American Music Awards	1987	Madonna	Favorite Pop/Rock Female Artist	Nominated	
American Music Awards	1987	Madonna	Favorite Pop/Rock Female Video Artist	Won	
American Music Awards	1987	"Live to Tell"	Favorite Pop/Rock Single	Nominated	
American Music Awards	1988	Madonna	Favorite Pop/Rock Female Artist	Nominated	
American Music Awards	1990	Madonna	Favorite Pop/Rock Female Artist	Nominated	
American Music Awards	1990	"Like a Prayer"	Favorite Dance Single	Nominated	
American Music Awards	1991	Madonna	Favorite Dance Artist	Nominated	
American Music Awards	1991	Madonna	Favorite Pop/Rock Female Artist	Nominated	
American Music Awards	1991	"Vogue"	Favorite Pop/Rock Single	Nominated	
American Music Awards	1991	"Vogue"	Favorite Dance Single	Won	
American Music Awards	1992	Madonna	Favorite Dance Artist	Nominated	
American Music Awards	1998	Evita	Favorite Soundtrack	Nominated	
American Music Awards	2000	Madonna	Artist of the Decades (fan vote) — 1980s	Nominated	
American Music Awards	2003	Madonna	Michael Jackson International Artist of the Year	Won	
American Music Awards	2016	Rebel Heart Tour	Tour of the Year	Nominated	
American Salon Awards	1987	Madonna	Hair (street)	Won	
American Video Awards	1987	"Papa Don't Preach"	Best Performance, Female	Won	
American Video Awards	1987	"Open Your Heart"	Best Performance, Female	Nominated	
Amusement & Music Operators Association (AMOA)	1985	"Like a Virgin"	Jukebox Music Awards: Pop	Nominated	
Amusement & Music Operators Association (AMOA)	1985	"Material Girl"	Jukebox Music Awards: Rock	Nominated	
Anděl Awards (Note: Also presented as Deska Roku Allianz, a ceremony award in Czech Republic organized by the Czech Academy of Popular Music and IFPI.)	2006	I'm Going to Tell You a Secret	Best-Selling Foreign DVD/VHS of the Year	Nominated	
Anděl Awards	2007	The Confessions Tour	Best-Selling Foreign DVD/VHS of the Year	Won	
AOL TV Viewer Awards	2002	Madonna Live! – Drowned World Tour 2001	Best TV Concert	Won	
Arena magazine	1999	Madonna	Woman of the Year	Won	
Arion Music Awards	2006	Confessions on a Dance Floor	Best Selling Foreign Album	Won	
Arion Music Awards	2006	"Hung Up"	Best Selling Foreign Single	Won	
Arion Music Awards	2007	Confessions on a Dance Floor	Best Selling Foreign Album	Won	
Arion Music Awards	2007	"Hung Up"	Best Selling Foreign Single	Won	
ARTISTdirect Online Music Awards	1999	Madonna	Favorite Female Artist	Won	
ARTISTdirect Online Music Awards	2000	Madonna	Most Talked About Celebrity	Won	
ARTISTdirect Online Music Awards	2000	Madonna	Internet Hero	Nominated	
ARTISTdirect Online Music Awards	2000	Madonna	Coolest Artist With Dyed Hair	Nominated	
ARTISTdirect Online Music Awards	2000	www.madonnamusic.com (Note: Former official website for album Music)	Best Official Site	Nominated	
ASCAP Film and Television Music Awards	1987	"Live to Tell"	Most Performed Songs from Motion Pictures	Won	
ASCAP Film and Television Music Awards	1988	"Who's That Girl"	Most Performed Songs from Motion Pictures	Won	
ASCAP Film and Television Music Awards	1993	"This Used to Be My Playground"	Most Performed Songs from Motion Pictures	Won	
ASCAP Film and Television Music Awards	2000	"Beautiful Stranger"	Most Performed Songs from Motion Pictures	Won	
ASCAP Latin Music Awards	2021	"Mamacita"	Award-Winning Song	Won	
ASCAP Pop Music Awards	1986	"Lucky Star"	Most Performed Song	Won	
ASCAP Pop Music Awards	1986	"Into the Groove"	Most Performed Song	Won	
ASCAP Pop Music Awards	1987	"Live to Tell"	Most Performed Song	Won	
ASCAP Pop Music Awards	1988	"La Isla Bonita"	Most Performed Song	Won	
ASCAP Pop Music Awards	1988	"Open Your Heart"	Most Performed Song	Won	
ASCAP Pop Music Awards	1988	"True Blue"	Most Performed Song	Won	
ASCAP Pop Music Awards	1988	"Who's That Girl"	Most Performed Song	Won	
ASCAP Pop Music Awards	1989	"Causing a Commotion"	Most Performed Song	Won	
ASCAP Pop Music Awards	1990	"Like a Prayer"	Most Performed Song	Won	
ASCAP Pop Music Awards	1990	"Express Yourself"	Most Performed Song	Won	
ASCAP Pop Music Awards	1991	"Cherish"	Most Performed Song	Won	
ASCAP Pop Music Awards	1991	"Vogue"	Most Performed Song	Won	
ASCAP Pop Music Awards	1992	"Justify My Love"	Most Performed Song	Won	
ASCAP Pop Music Awards	1994	"This Used to Be My Playground"	Most Performed Song	Won	
ASCAP Pop Music Awards	1995	"I'll Remember"	Most Performed Song	Won	
ASCAP Pop Music Awards	1996	"Secret"	Most Performed Song	Won	
ASCAP Pop Music Awards	1996	"Take a Bow"	Most Performed Song	Won	
ASCAP Pop Music Awards	1997	"You'll See"	Most Performed Song	Won	
ASCAP Pop Music Awards	1999	"Frozen"	Most Performed Song	Won	
ASCAP Pop Music Awards	1999	"Ray of Light"	Most Performed Song	Won	
ASCAP Pop Music Awards	2000	"Beautiful Stranger"	Most Performed Song	Won	
ASCAP Pop Music Awards	2002	"Music"	Most Performed Song	Won	
ASCAP Pop Music Awards	2002	"Don't Tell Me"	Most Performed Song	Won	
ASCAP Pop Music Awards	2006	"Hung Up"	Most Performed Song	Won	
ASCAP Rhythm & Soul Music Awards	1996	"Human Nature"	Top Dance Song	Won	
ASCAP Rhythm & Soul Music Awards	1999	"Ray of Light"	Top Dance Song	Won	
ASCAP Rhythm & Soul Music Awards	1999	"Frozen"	Award-Winning Dance Song	Won	
ASCAP Rhythm & Soul Music Awards	2000	"Nothing Really Matters"	Award-Winning Dance Song	Won	
ASCAP Rhythm & Soul Music Awards	2001	"Music"	Top Dance Song	Won	
ASCAP Rhythm & Soul Music Awards	2002	"Don't Tell Me"	Award-Winning Dance Song	Won	
Astro's Channel [V] Malaysian Asian Music Awards	1997	Madonna	Best International Female	Nominated	
BDSCertified Spin Awards	2002	"Music"	300,000 Spins	Won	
BDSCertified Spin Awards	2002	"Die Another Day"	50,000 Spins	Won	
BDSCertified Spin Awards	2004	"Me Against the Music"	50,000 Spins	Won	
BDSCertified Spin Awards	2005	"Hung Up"	50,000 Spins	Won	
BDSCertified Spin Awards	2006	"Hung Up"	100,000 Spins	Won	
BDSCertified Spin Awards	2006	"Santa Baby"	50,000 Spins	Won	
BDSCertified Spin Awards	2008	"4 Minutes"	50,000 Spins	Won	
Beauty Crush Awards	2020	MDNA: The Beauty Roller	Best Face Roller	Won	
Bent Readers Awards	2006	Madonna at G-A-Y	Event of the Year	Won	
Billboard Music Awards	1996	Madonna	Artist Achievement Award	Honoree	
Billboard Music Awards	2004	"Me Against the Music"	Top Hot Dance Single Sales	Won	
Billboard Music Awards	2013	Madonna	Top Touring Artist	Won	
Billboard Music Awards	2013	Madonna	Top Dance Artist	Won	
Billboard Music Awards	2013	MDNA	Top Dance Album	Won	
Billboard Music Awards	2016	Madonna	Top Touring Artist	Nominated	
Billboard Music of the '80s Poll Awards	1990	Madonna	Pop Artist of the Decade	Honoree	
Billboard Music of the '80s Poll Awards	1990	Madonna	Dance Artist of the Decade	Honoree	
Billboard Music of the '80s Poll Awards	1990	"Into the Groove"	Dance Single of the Decade	Honoree	
Billboard Music Video Awards	1989	"Express Yourself"	Best Video	Won	
Billboard Music Video Awards	1992	"This Used to Be My Playground"	Best Pop/Rock Female Artist	Nominated	
Billboard Music Video Awards	1999	"Beautiful Stranger"	Best Pop Clip of the Year	Nominated	
Billboard Music Video Awards	2000	"Music"	Best Pop Clip of the Year	Nominated	
Billboard Music Video Awards	2000	"Music"	Best Video of the Year	Won	
Billboard Music Video Awards	2001	"Don't Tell Me"	Best Pop Clip of the Year	Nominated	
Billboard Music Video Awards	2001	"What It Feels Like for a Girl"	Best Dance Clip of the Year	Nominated	
Billboard Number One Awards (Note: Prior to the inauguration of the Billboard Music Awards in 1990, the magazine had the "Number One Awards" to honor the top-performing artists of the year on each of chart categories.)	1985	Madonna	Top Pop Artist of the Year	Won	
Billboard Number One Awards	1985	Madonna	Top Pop Singles Artist	Won	
Billboard Number One Awards	1985	Madonna	Top Pop Album Artist – Female	Won	
Billboard Number One Awards	1985	Madonna	Top Pop Singles Artist – Female	Won	
Billboard Number One Awards	1985	Madonna	Top Dance Sales Artist	Won	
Billboard Number One Awards	1985	Madonna	Top Dance Club Play Artist	Won	
Billboard Number One Awards	1985	Madonna	Top Music Videocassette	Won	
Billboard Number One Awards	1986	Madonna Live: The Virgin Tour	Top Music Videocassette	Won	
Billboard Number One Awards	1987	Madonna	Top Pop Singles Artist	Won	
Billboard Number One Awards	1987	Madonna	Top Pop Singles Artist – Female	Won	
Billboard Number One Awards	1987	Madonna	Top Dance Sales Artist	Won	
Billboard Number One Awards	1989	Madonna	Top Adult Contemporary Artist	Won	
Billboard Touring Awards	2004	Re-Invention World Tour	Top Tour	Won	
Billboard Touring Awards	2006	Confessions Tour	Top Boxscore	Won	
Billboard Touring Awards	2006	Confessions Tour	Top Draw	Nominated	
Billboard Touring Awards	2006	Confessions Tour	Top Tour	Nominated	
Billboard Touring Awards	2009	Sticky & Sweet Tour	Top Draw	Won	
Billboard Touring Awards	2009	Sticky & Sweet Tour	Top Tour	Won	
Billboard Touring Awards	2012	The MDNA Tour	Concert Marketing and Promotion Award	Nominated	
Billboard Touring Awards	2012	The MDNA Tour	Top Tour	Nominated	
Billboard Women in Music	2016	Madonna	Woman of the Year	Won	
Billboard.com Mid-Year Music Awards	2012	Avicii featuring Madonna at Ultra Music Festival	Best Festival Performance	Won	
Billboard.com Mid-Year Music Awards	2012	Madonna	First-Half MVP	Won	
Billboard.com Mid-Year Music Awards	2012	Madonna at Super Bowl XLVI	Best TV Performance	Won	
Billboard.com Mid-Year Music Awards	2012	Madonna vs. Lady Gaga	Most Memorable Feud	Won	
Billboard.com Mid-Year Music Awards	2015	Madonna	First-Half MVP	Nominated	
Billboard.com Mid-Year Music Awards	2015	"Bitch I'm Madonna"	Best Music Video	Nominated	
Blockbuster Entertainment Awards	1995	Madonna	Favorite Female Artist – Pop	Nominated	
Blockbuster Entertainment Awards	1998	Evita	Favorite Actress – Drama	Nominated	
Blockbuster Entertainment Awards	2001	Music	Favorite Female Artist of the Year	Nominated	
Blockbuster Entertainment Awards	2001	Music	Favorite Female Artist — Pop (Internet Only)	Nominated	
Blockbuster Entertainment Awards	2001	"Music"	Favorite Single (Internet Only)	Nominated	
Blue Peter badge	2005	Madonna	Blue Peter Badge	Won	
Boyz Readers Awards	2006	Madonna at G-A-Y	Event of the Year	Won	
Bravo's A-List Awards	2009	"4 Minutes"	A-List Download	Nominated	
Bravo Otto Awards (Germany)	1985	Madonna	Best Female Singer	Gold	
Bravo Otto Awards (Germany)	1986	Madonna	Best Female Singer	Gold	
Bravo Otto Awards (Germany)	1987	Madonna	Best Female Singer	Gold	
Bravo Otto Awards (Germany)	1989	Madonna	Best Female Singer	Silver	
Bravo Otto Awards (Germany)	1992	Madonna	Best Female Singer	Silver	
Bravo Otto Awards (Germany)	1992	Madonna	Best Show	Won	
Bravo Otto Awards (Germany)	1992	Erotica	Best LP	Won	
Bravo Otto Awards (Germany)	1993	Madonna	Best Female Singer	Bronze	
Bravo Otto Awards (Germany)	1994	Madonna	Best Female Singer	Bronze	
Bravo Otto Awards (Hungary)	2006	Confessions on a Dance Floor	Best Foreign Album	Won	
BreakTudo Awards	2026	"Bring Your Love" (with Sabrina Carpenter)	International Collaboration of the Year	Pending	
Brit Awards	1986	Madonna	International Solo Artist	Nominated	
Brit Awards	1987	Madonna	International Solo Artist	Nominated	
Brit Awards	1988	Madonna	International Solo Artist	Nominated	
Brit Awards	1991	Madonna	International Female Solo Artist	Nominated	
Brit Awards	1992	Madonna	International Solo Artist	Nominated	
Brit Awards	1993	Madonna	International Solo Artist	Nominated	
Brit Awards	1995	Madonna	International Female Solo Artist	Nominated	
Brit Awards	1999	Madonna	International Female Solo Artist	Nominated	
Brit Awards	2001	Madonna	International Female Solo Artist	Won	
Brit Awards	2006	Madonna	International Female Solo Artist	Won	
Brit Awards	2006	Madonna	Best Pop Act	Nominated	
Brit Awards	2006	Confessions on a Dance Floor	International Album	Nominated	
British LGBT Awards	2017	Madonna	Viacom Top 10 Music Artists	Won	
British Videogram Association (BVA)	1991	The Immaculate Collection	Top Music Video	Won	
Broadcast Tech Innovation Awards	2019	Madonna	Best use of AR (Madonna at the 2019 Billboard Music Awards)	Won	
BT Digital Music Awards	2006	Madonna Fansite	Best Unofficial Music Site	Nominated	
Buenos Aires Music Video Festival	2020	World of Madame X	Best Documentary	Won	
CableACE Awards	1994	The Girlie Show: Live Down Under	Best Musical Special	Nominated	
Capital Gold Legends Awards	2003	Madonna	Legendary Female	Nominated	
Capital Music Awards	2001	Madonna	Best International Solo Artist	Won	
Capital Music Awards	2006	Madonna	Best International Female Artist	Won	
Cash Box Programmers Choice Awards	1986	Madonna	Top Female Vocalist: Music Video	4th place	
Cash Box Programmers Choice Awards	1986	Madonna	Top Female Artist: Singles	3rd place	
Cash Box Programmers Choice Awards	1986	"Live to Tell"	Top Single From A Soundtrack	4th place	
Cash Box Programmers Choice Awards	1988	Madonna	Top Female Artist	Won	
Cash Box Programmers Choice Awards	1988	Madonna	Top Female Artist: Singles	2nd place	
Cash Box Programmers Choice Awards	1988	Madonna	Top Female Artist: Videos	4th place	
Cash Box Programmers Choice Awards	1988	Madonna	Top Female Artist: Albums	3rd place	
Cash Box Programmers Choice Awards	1988	Madonna	Top Female Artist: 12" Singles	3rd place	
Cash Box Programmers Choice Awards	1988	"Open Your Heart"	Top 10 Singles	4th place	
Cash Box Programmers Choice Awards	1989	Madonna	Pop Singles Awards: Top Female Artist	2nd place	
Cash Box Programmers Choice Awards	1989	Madonna	Dance Singles Awards: Top Female Artist	Won	
Cash Box Programmers Choice Awards	1989	Madonna	Pop Albums Awards: Top Female Artist	2nd place	
Cash Box Programmers Choice Awards	1989	"Like a Prayer"	Pop Singles Awards	Won	
Cash Box Programmers Choice Awards	1989	"Like a Prayer"	Dance Singles Awards	Won	
Cash Box Programmers Choice Awards	1989	Like a Prayer	Pop Albums Awards	Nominated	
Cash Box Year-End Awards	1983	Madonna	Pop Singles Awards: New Female	2nd place	
Cash Box Year-End Awards	1983	Madonna	Pop Album Awards	2nd place	
Cash Box Year-End Awards	1983	Madonna	Black Contemporary Singles Awards: New Female	2nd place	
Cash Box Year-End Awards	1984	Madonna	Black Contemporary Singles Awards: Top Pop Crossover Vocalist	Won	
Cash Box Year-End Awards	1984	Madonna	Black Contemporary Singles Awards: Top Female Vocalist	Won	
Cash Box Year-End Awards	1984	Madonna	Pop Singles Awards: Top Female Vocalist	4th place	
Cash Box Year-End Awards	1984	Madonna	Pop Albums Awards: Top Female Vocalist	4th place	
Cash Box Year-End Awards	1984	Madonna	Black Contemporary Album Awards	Nominated	
Cash Box Year-End Awards	1985	Madonna	Pop Singles Awards: Top Female Artist	Won	
Cash Box Year-End Awards	1985	Madonna	Pop Albums Awards: Top Female Artist	Won	
Cash Box Year-End Awards	1985	Madonna	Special Achievement: Pop Singles	Honoree	
Cash Box Year-End Awards	1985	Madonna	12" Singles Awards: Top Female Vocalist	Won	
Cash Box Year-End Awards	1985	Madonna	Music Video Awards: Top Female Vocalist	2nd place	
Cash Box Year-End Awards	1985	Like a Virgin	Pop Albums Awards	2nd place	
Cash Box Year-End Awards	1985	Like a Virgin	Compact Disc Awards	3rd place	
Cash Box Year-End Awards	1985	Like a Virgin	Black Contemporary Albums Awards	Nominated	
Cash Box Year-End Awards	1985	"Into the Groove"	Top Music Video	Nominated	
Cash Box Year-End Awards	1985	"Into the Groove"	12" Singles Awards	3rd place	
Cash Box Year-End Awards	1986	Madonna	Pop Singles Awards: Top Female Artist	Won	
Cash Box Year-End Awards	1986	Madonna	Pop Singles Awards: Top A/C Female Artist	Won	
Cash Box Year-End Awards	1986	Madonna	"12 Singles Awards: Top Female Vocalist	2nd place	
Cash Box Year-End Awards	1986	Madonna	Pop Album Awards: Top Female Artist	4th place	
Cash Box Year-End Awards	1986	Madonna	Music Video Awards: Top Female Vocalist	4th place	
Cash Box Year-End Awards	1986	True Blue	Pop Album Awards	Nominated	
Cash Box Year-End Awards	1987	Madonna	Pop Albums Awards: Top Female Artist	5th place	
Cash Box Year-End Awards	1987	Madonna	Music Video Awards: Top Female Artist	3rd place	
Cash Box Year-End Awards	1987	"Open Your Heart"	Pop Singles Awards: Top 50 Pop Singles	Nominated	
Cash Box Year-End Awards	1987	"Who's That Girl"	Pop Singles Awards: Top 50 Pop Singles	Nominated	
Cash Box Year-End Awards	1987	"Causing a Commotion"	Pop Singles Awards: Top 50 Pop Singles	Nominated	
Cash Box Year-End Awards	1987	"La Isla Bonita"	Pop Singles Awards: Top 50 Pop Singles	Nominated	
Cash Box Year-End Awards	1989	Like a Prayer	Pop Albums Awards: Top 50 Pop Albums	Nominated	
Cash Box Year-End Awards	1989	Madonna	Pop Albums Awards: Top Female Artist	2nd place	
Cash Box Year-End Awards	1989	"Like a Prayer"	Pop Singles Awards: Top 50 Pop Singles	Won	
Cash Box Year-End Awards	1989	"Express Yourself"	Pop Singles Awards: Top 50 Pop Singles	Nominated	
Cash Box Year-End Awards	1989	"Cherish"	Pop Singles Awards: Top 50 Pop Singles	Nominated	
Cash Box Year-End Awards	1989	Madonna	Pop Singles Awards: Top Female Artist	2nd place	
Cash Box Year-End Awards	1989	"Like a Prayer"	Rap & Dance Awards: Top 25 Dance Singles	Won	
Cash Box Year-End Awards	1989	"Express Yourself"	Rap & Dance Awards: Top 25 Dance Singles	Nominated	
Cash Box Year-End Awards	1989	"Cherish"	Rap & Dance Awards: Top 25 Dance Singles	Nominated	
Cash Box Year-End Awards	1989	"Into the Groove"	Club/Dance Song of the Decade	Honoree	
Cash Box Year-End Awards	1990	I'm Breathless	Pop Album Awards: Top 50 Albums	Nominated	
Cash Box Year-End Awards	1990	"Vogue"	Pop Singles Awards: Top 50 Pop Singles	Won	
Cash Box Year-End Awards	1990	Madonna	Pop Female Singer	3rd place	
Cash Box Year-End Awards	1990	"Vogue"	Rap & Dance Awards: Top 25 Dance Singles	3rd place	
Cash Box Year-End Awards	1991	The Immaculate Collection	Pop Albums Awards: Top 50 Pop Albums	Nominated	
Cash Box Year-End Awards	1992	"This Used to Be My Playground"	Pop Singles Awards: Top 50 Pop Singles	Nominated	
Cash Box Year-End Awards	1993	Erotica	Pop Albums Awards: Top 50 Pop Albums	Nominated	
Cash Box Year-End Awards	1994	Madonna	Pop Singles Awards: Top Female Artist	4th place	
Cash Box Year-End Awards	1994	"I'll Remember"	Pop Singles Awards: Top 50 Pop Singles	Nominated	
Cash Box Year-End Awards	1994	"Secret"	Pop Singles Awards: Top 50 Pop Singles	Nominated	
Cash Box Year-End Awards	1995	Madonna	Pop Singles Awards: Top Female Artist	Won	
Cash Box Year-End Awards	1995	Madonna	Top Pop/Rock Female Artist	Nominated	
Cash Box Year-End Awards	1995	"Take a Bow"	Top Pop Singles	2nd place	
Cash Box Year-End Awards	1995	Bedtime Stories	Top Pop Albums	Nominated	
CD Review Awards	1994	Madonna	Diva of the Decade	Honoree	
Channel [V] Thailand Music Video Awards	2004	"Me Against the Music" (Britney Spears featuring Madonna)	Thailand Viewer's Choice	Won	
Choix du Québec (Note: Presented by Radiomutuel)	1990	"Vogue"	Most Popular Anglophone Song	Nominated	
Clairol Colour Awards	2002	Madonna	Best Colour	Runner-up	
CMJ New Music Awards	1984	Madonna	Best Female Solo Artist	Nominated	
CMJ New Music Awards	1989	Madonna	Female Artist of the Year	Nominated	
CMJ New Music Awards	1989	"Like a Prayer"	Video of the Year	Nominated	
CMJ New Music Awards	1989	"Express Yourself"	Video of the Year	Nominated	
Composers and Authors Society of Hong Kong	2009	"4 Minutes"	English Pop Work	Won	
Cosmo Readers Choice Awards	2001	Madonna	Best Female Singer	2nd place	
Cosmopolitan Hong Kong Beauty Awards	2018	MDNA Skin	Winning Brand	Won	
Countdown Australian Music Awards	1985	Madonna	Most Popular International Act	Nominated	
Countdown Australian Music Awards	1985	Madonna	Best Female Singer	Won	
Countdown Australian Music Awards	1986	Madonna	Top Female Vocalist	Won	
Countdown Australian Music Awards	1986	Madonna	Most Popular International Act	Nominated	
Countdown Australian Music Awards	1992	Madonna	Most Popular International Solo Female Artist	Won	
Dance Music Awards (Note: According to Billboard, an award presented by Dance Music Academy of Arts & Sciences and broadcast on Golden West Television.)	1990	Madonna	Best Dance Artist	Nominated	
Danish Music Awards	1999	Madonna	Best International Female Vocalist	Won	
Danish Music Awards	1999	Ray of Light	Best International Album	Won	
Danish Music Awards	2001	Music	Best International Album	Won	
Danish Music Awards	2001	"Music"	Best International Hit	Won	
Detroit Music Awards	2001	Music	Outstanding National Album	Nominated	
Detroit Music Awards	2009	Hard Candy	Outstanding Major Label Recording	Nominated	
Detroit Music Awards	2020	Madame X	Outstanding Major Label Recording	Nominated	
DJ Awards	1987	Madonna	Female Artist of the Year	Won	
DJ Awards	1987	Madonna in Who's That Girl World Tour	Concert of the Year	Nominated	
Dorian Awards	2015	"Same Love"	Best TV Musical Performance (Note: Nomination credited to Madonna, Macklemore, Ryan Lewis, and others for their performance at the 2015 Grammy Awards)	Nominated	
Dotmusic Online Music Awards	2001	Brixton Academy concert webcast	Top Live Online Music Event	Won	
Dotmusic Online Music Awards	2002	Drowned World Tour	Best Music DVD	Won	
E! Awards	2001	Madonna	Entertainer of the Year	Nominated	
E! Golden Hanger Awards	1998	Madonna	Best Body of the Year	Nominated	
Echo Awards	1996	Madonna	Best International Female Artist	Won	
Echo Awards	2001	Madonna	Best International Female Artist	Nominated	
Echo Awards	2004	Madonna	Best International Female Artist	Nominated	
Echo Awards	2006	Madonna	Best International Female Artist	Won	
Echo Awards	2006	"Hung Up"	Hit of the Year	Won	
Echo Awards	2009	Madonna	Best International Female Artist	Nominated	
Echo Awards	2016	Madonna	Best International Female Artist	Nominated	
Edison Award	1999	Madonna	Best International Female Artist	Won	
Edison Award	2001	Madonna	Best International Female Artist	Won	
Electronic Dance Music Awards	2024	"Sorry" (remix) (Note: Madonna with Blond:ish, Eran Hersh & Darmon)	Dance Song of the Year	Nominated	
Elle Style Awards	1998	Madonna	Most Stylish Female Pop Star	Nominated	
Elle Style Awards	1999	Madonna	Female Music Star	Nominated	
Elle Style Awards	2007	Madonna	Style Icon Award	Honoree	
Emma Gaala	2000	Madonna	Foreign Artist of the Year	Nominated	
Emma Gaala	2009	Madonna	Foreign Artist of the Year	Nominated	
Filipino Music Awards	2026	Madonna	People's Choice – International Artist	Nominated	
Flash Film Festival	2000	MadonnaMusic	Best Website — Design	Won	
Fryderyk	1999	Ray of Light	Best Foreign Album	Won	
Fryderyk	2001	Music	Best Foreign Album	Nominated	
GAFFA Awards	1992	Madonna	Most Overrated	Won	
GAFFA Awards	1998	Ray of Light	Best Foreign Album	Nominated	
GAFFA Awards	1998	"Frozen"	Best Foreign Music Video	Nominated	
GAFFA Awards	1998	Madonna	Best Foreign Female Act	Won	
GAFFA Awards	2000	Madonna	Best Foreign Female Act	Won	
GAFFA Awards	2000	"Music"	Best Foreign Single	Nominated	
GAFFA Awards	2003	Madonna	Best Foreign Female Act	Nominated	
GAFFA Awards	2005	Madonna	Best Foreign Female Act	Won	
GAFFA Awards	2006	Madonna	Best Foreign Female Act	Nominated	
Gaygalan Awards	2006	"Hung Up"	International Song of the Year	Won	
Gaygalan Awards	2009	"Miles Away"	International Song of the Year	Nominated	
Gaygalan Awards	2009	"4 Minutes"	International Song of the Year	Nominated	
Gaygalan Awards	2010	"Celebration"	International Song of the Year	Nominated	
Gay.it Awards	2022	"Break My Soul (The Queen Remix)"	International Song of the Year	Nominated	
Gay.it Awards	2022	"Into The Groove Remix"	International Song of the Year	Nominated	
Gay Times Readers' Awards	2008	Madonna	All-Time Female Icon	Bronze	
GLAAD Media Awards	1991	Madonna	Raising Gay Awareness	Honoree	
GLAAD Media Awards	2019	Madonna	Advocate for Change Award	Honoree	
Glamour Awards	1990	Madonna	Woman of the Year	Won	
Global Awards	2024	Madonna	Global Legend	Nominated	
Golden Apple Awards	1992	Madonna	Sour Apple Award	Won	
Golden Globe Awards	1988	"Who's That Girl"	Best Original Song	Nominated	
Golden Globe Awards	1993	"This Used to Be My Playground"	Best Original Song	Nominated	
Golden Globe Awards	1995	"I'll Remember"	Best Original Song	Nominated	
Golden Globe Awards	1997	Evita	Best Actress – Motion Picture Musical or Comedy	Won	
Golden Globe Awards	2000	"Beautiful Stranger"	Best Original Song	Nominated	
Golden Globe Awards	2003	"Die Another Day"	Best Original Song	Nominated	
Golden Globe Awards	2012	"Masterpiece"	Best Original Song	Won	
Golden Raspberry Awards	1987	Shanghai Surprise	Worst Actress	Won	
Golden Raspberry Awards	1988	Who's That Girl	Worst Actress	Won	
Golden Raspberry Awards	1990	Bloodhounds of Broadway	Worst Supporting Actress	Nominated	
Golden Raspberry Awards	1990	Madonna	Worst Actress of the Decade	Nominated	
Golden Raspberry Awards	1990	Madonna	Worst New Star of the Decade	Nominated	
Golden Raspberry Awards	1992	Madonna: Truth or Dare	Worst Actress	Nominated	
Golden Raspberry Awards	1994	Body of Evidence	Worst Actress	Won	
Golden Raspberry Awards	1996	Four Rooms	Worst Supporting Actress	Won	
Golden Raspberry Awards	2000	Madonna	Worst Actress of the Century	Won	
Golden Raspberry Awards	2001	The Next Best Thing	Worst Actress	Won	
Golden Raspberry Awards	2001	The Next Best Thing	Worst Screen Couple	Nominated	
Golden Raspberry Awards	2003	Swept Away	Worst Actress	Won	
Golden Raspberry Awards	2003	Swept Away	Worst Screen Couple	Won	
Golden Raspberry Awards	2003	Die Another Day	Worst Supporting Actress	Won	
Golden Raspberry Awards	2003	"Die Another Day"	Worst Original Song	Nominated	
Golden Raspberry Awards	2010	Madonna	Worst Actress of the Decade	Nominated	
Grammy Awards	1986	"Crazy for You"	Best Pop Vocal Performance, Female	Nominated	
Grammy Awards	1987	"Papa Don't Preach"	Best Pop Vocal Performance, Female	Nominated	
Grammy Awards	1988	"Who's That Girl"	Best Song Written Specifically for a Motion Picture or Television	Nominated	
Grammy Awards	1991	"Oh Father"	Best Music Video, Short Form	Nominated	
Grammy Awards	1992	Blond Ambition World Tour Live	Best Music Video, Long Form	Won	
Grammy Awards	1995	The Girlie Show: Live Down Under	Best Music Video, Long Form	Nominated	
Grammy Awards	1995	"I'll Remember"	Best Song Written Specifically for a Motion Picture or Television	Nominated	
Grammy Awards	1996	Bedtime Stories	Best Pop Album	Nominated	
Grammy Awards	1999	Ray of Light	Album of the Year	Nominated	
Grammy Awards	1999	Ray of Light	Best Pop Album	Won	
Grammy Awards	1999	"Ray of Light"	Best Dance Recording	Won	
Grammy Awards	1999	"Ray of Light"	Best Short Form Music Video	Won	
Grammy Awards	1999	"Ray of Light"	Record of the Year	Nominated	
Grammy Awards	2000	"Beautiful Stranger"	Best Female Pop Vocal Performance	Nominated	
Grammy Awards	2000	"Beautiful Stranger"	Best Song Written for a Motion Picture, Television or Other Visual Media	Won	
Grammy Awards	2001	Music	Best Pop Vocal Album	Nominated	
Grammy Awards	2001	"Music"	Best Female Pop Vocal Performance	Nominated	
Grammy Awards	2001	"Music"	Record of the Year	Nominated	
Grammy Awards	2002	"Don't Tell Me"	Best Short Form Music Video	Nominated	
Grammy Awards	2004	"Die Another Day"	Best Dance Recording	Nominated	
Grammy Awards	2004	"Die Another Day"	Best Short Form Music Video	Nominated	
Grammy Awards	2007	Confessions on a Dance Floor	Best Electronic/Dance Album	Won	
Grammy Awards	2007	"Get Together"	Best Dance Recording	Nominated	
Grammy Awards	2007	I'm Going to Tell You a Secret	Best Long Form Music Video	Nominated	
Grammy Awards	2008	The Confessions Tour	Best Long Form Music Video	Won	
Grammy Awards	2009	"4 Minutes"	Best Pop Collaboration with Vocals	Nominated	
Grammy Awards	2009	"Give It 2 Me"	Best Dance Recording	Nominated	
Grammy Awards	2010	"Celebration"	Best Dance Recording	Nominated	
Grammy Awards	2027	Confessions II	Best Dance/Electronic Album	Pending	
Grammy Awards	2027	"Bring Your Love" (with Sabrina Carpenter)	Best Pop Duo/Group Performance	Pending	
Grammy Awards	2027	"Danceteria"	Best Dance Pop Recording	Pending	
Grammy Awards	2027	"I Feel So Free"	Best Dance/Electronic Recording	Pending	
Harper's Bazaar Beauty Awards	2018	MDNA Skin: The Eye Mask	Best Eye Mask	Won	
Harper's Bazaar Beauty Awards	2019	MDNA Skin: The Beauty Roller	Anti-Aging Awards: Best Tool	Won	
Her World Beauty Awards	2019	MDNA Skin: The Serum	Best Anti-Ageing Hydrating Serum	Won	
Hit Awards (Hong Kong)	1992	Madonna	Top Female Artist	Nominated	
Hit Awards (Hong Kong)	1992	Madonna	Top Dance Act	Nominated	
Hit Awards (Hong Kong)	1992	"Erotica"	Song of the Year	Nominated	
Hit Awards (Norway)	2001	Madonna	Best International Female Artist	Won	
Hit Awards (Norway)	2001	"Don't Tell Me"	Hit of the Year	Nominated	
Hit Awards (Norway)	2001	"Music"	Hit of the Year	Nominated	
Hit Awards (Singapore)	1996	Madonna	Best International Female Artist	Nominated	
Hit FM Music Awards (China)	2009	Madonna	Best Female Artist	Nominated	
Hit FM Music Awards (China)	2009	"Miles Away"	Top 10 Songs of the Year	Won	
Hit FM Music Awards (China)	2009	"Give It 2 Me"	Top 10 Songs of the Year	Nominated	
Hit FM Music Awards (China)	2009	"4 Minutes"	Top 10 Songs of the Year	Nominated	
HMV's Poll of Polls	1999	Madonna	Best Female Vocalist of the Millennium	Honoree	
Hong Kong Top Sales Music Awards	2001	Music	Top Ten Best Selling Foreign Albums of the Year	Won	
Hong Kong Top Sales Music Awards	2005	Confessions on a Dance Floor	Top Ten Best Selling Foreign Albums of the Year	Won	
Hong Kong Top Sales Music Awards	2007	The Confessions Tour	Top Ten Best Selling Foreign Albums of the Year	Won	
Hungarian Music Awards	1999	Ray of Light	International Pop Album of the Year	Won	
Hungarian Music Awards	2001	Music	International Pop Album of the Year	Won	
Hungarian Music Awards	2004	American Life	International Pop Album of the Year	Nominated	
Hungarian Music Awards	2005	American Life	International Pop Album of the Year	Nominated	
Hungarian Music Awards	2006	Confessions on a Dance Floor	International Pop Album of the Year	Nominated	
Hungarian Music Awards	2009	Hard Candy	International Pop Album of the Year	Nominated	
HX Awards	2006	"Hung Up"	Best Dance Track	Won	
HX Awards	2007	"Sorry" (Pet Shop Boys Remixes)	Best Song	Won	
HX Awards	2008	"4 Minutes"	Best Song	Nominated	
iHeartRadio Music Awards	2024	The Celebration Tour	Favorite Tour Style	Nominated	
International Dance Music Awards	1999	Madonna	Best Dance Solo Artist	Won	
International Dance Music Awards	1999	"Ray of Light"	Best Dance Video	Won	
International Dance Music Awards	2001	Madonna	Best Dance Solo Artist	Won	
International Dance Music Awards	2001	"Music"	Best Dance Video	Won	
International Dance Music Awards	2001	"Music"	Best Pop 12" Dance Record	Won	
International Dance Music Awards	2002	Madonna	Best Dance Solo Artist	Won	
International Dance Music Awards	2006	Madonna	Best Dance Solo Artist	Won	
International Dance Music Awards	2006	"Hung Up"	Best Dance Video	Won	
International Dance Music Awards	2006	"Hung Up"	Best Pop Dance Track	Won	
International Dance Music Awards	2007	Madonna	Best Dance Solo Artist	Won	
International Dance Music Awards	2007	"Jump"	Best Dance Music Video	Won	
International Dance Music Awards	2009	Madonna	Best Solo Artist	Nominated	
International Dance Music Awards	2009	"4 Minutes"	Best Pop Dance Track	Nominated	
International Dance Music Awards	2010	Madonna	Best Solo Artist	Nominated	
International Dance Music Awards	2010	"Celebration"	Best Pop Dance Track	Nominated	
International Dance Music Awards	2013	Madonna	Best Dance Solo Artist	Nominated	
International Dance Music Awards	2013	"Girl Gone Wild"	Best Dance Music Video	Nominated	
International Dance Music Awards	2013	"Girl Gone Wild"	Best Pop Dance Track	Nominated	
International Dance Music Awards	2015	"Bitch I'm Madonna"	Best Commercial/Pop Dance Track	Nominated	
International Dance Music Awards	2015	"Bitch I'm Madonna"	Best Dance Music Video	Nominated	
International Dance Music Awards	2015	Rebel Heart	Best Full Length Studio Recording	Nominated	
International Rock Awards	1989	Madonna	Best Female Vocalist	Won	
International Rock Awards	1991	Madonna	People's Choice Award	Won	
Irish Music Awards	1988	Madonna	Best International Female Artist	Won	
Italian Music Awards	2001	Madonna	Best International Female Artist	Nominated	
Italian Music Awards	2002	Music	Best International Album	Nominated	
Italian Music Awards	2002	"Don't Tell Me"	Best International Single	Nominated	
Italian Music Awards	2003	Madonna	Best International Female Artist	Nominated	
ITV1' National Music Awards	2002	Madonna	Favourite International Artist	Nominated	
Ivor Novello Awards	2000	"Beautiful Stranger"	Best Contemporary Song	Nominated	
Ivor Novello Awards	2000	"Beautiful Stranger"	Most Performed Work	Won	
Ivor Novello Awards	2000	"Ray of Light"	International Hit of the Year	Nominated	
Ivor Novello Awards	2007	"Sorry"	International Hit of the Year	Won	
Ivor Novello Awards	2007	"Sorry"	Most Performed Work	Nominated	
Japan Gold Disc Awards	1987	Madonna	Artist of the Year	Won	
Japan Gold Disc Awards	1987	True Blue	Grand Prix Album of the Year	Won	
Japan Gold Disc Awards	1987	True Blue	Best Album of the Year – Pops Solo	Won	
Japan Gold Disc Awards	1990	Madonna	Artist of the Year	Won	
Japan Gold Disc Awards	1990	Like a Prayer	Grand Prix Album of the Year	Won	
Japan Gold Disc Awards	1990	Like a Prayer	Best Album of the Year – Pops Solo	Won	
Japan Gold Disc Awards	1991	Madonna	Artist of the Year	Won	
Japan Gold Disc Awards	1991	I'm Breathless	Grand Prix Album of the Year	Won	
Japan Gold Disc Awards	1991	I'm Breathless	Best Album of the Year – Pop Female	Won	
Japan Gold Disc Awards	1993	Madonna	Artist of the Year	Won	
Japan Gold Disc Awards	1993	Erotica	Best Album of the Year – Pop	Won	
Japan Gold Disc Awards	2009	Madonna	Artist of the Year	Won	
Japan Gold Disc Awards	2009	Hard Candy	The Best 3 Albums	Won	
Japan Gold Disc Awards	2009	"Miles Away"	Mastertone of the Year	Won	
Japan Gold Disc Awards	2009	"Miles Away"	Single Track of the Year (mobile)	Won	
Japan Gold Disc Awards	2009	"Miles Away"	Single Track of the Year (online)	Won	
Japan Gold Disc Awards	2018	Rebel Heart Tour	Best Music Video	Won	
Japan Record Awards	1990	Madonna	Best Foreign Artist	Won	
Juno Awards	1985	Like a Virgin	International Album of the Year	Nominated	
Juno Awards	1987	True Blue	International Album of the Year	Won	
Juno Awards	1987	"Papa Don't Preach"	International Single of the Year	Nominated	
Juno Awards	1990	"Like a Prayer"	International Single of the Year	Nominated	
Juno Awards	1991	Madonna	International Entertainer of the Year	Nominated	
Juno Awards	1991	"Vogue"	Best Selling International Single	Won	
Juno Awards	1999	Ray of Light	Best Selling Album (Foreign or Domestic)	Nominated	
Juno Awards	2007	Confessions on a Dance Floor	International Album of the Year	Nominated	
LAByrinth Theater Company	2003	Madonna	Dave Hoghe Award	Honoree	
Living Fit Magazine Awards (Note: Living Fit was a lifestyle magazine for women 35 and over.)	1998	Madonna	Most Bodacious Back	Won	
Los 40 Music Awards	2006	Madonna	Best International Artist	Nominated	
Los 40 Music Awards	2006	"Hung Up"	Best International Song	Nominated	
Los 40 Music Awards	2008	Madonna	Best Concert or Tour	Nominated	
Los 40 Music Awards	2008	Madonna	Best International Artist	Nominated	
Los 40 Music Awards	2026	Confessions II	Best International Album	Nominated	
Lunas del Auditorio	2009	Madonna	Best Foreign Language Pop Artist	Won	
Lunas del Auditorio	2013	Madonna	Best Foreign Language Pop Artist	Won	
Lunas del Auditorio	2016	Madonna	Best Foreign Language Pop Artist	Nominated	
Marie Claire Hong Kong Beauty Awards	2016	MDNA Skin	#mcLikes Beauty Awards	Won	
Maxim Women of the Year Awards	2001	Madonna	Best International Singer	Won	
Meteor Ireland Music Awards	2002	GHV2	Best International Album	Nominated	
Meteor Ireland Music Awards	2002	Madonna	Best International Female	Nominated	
Meteor Ireland Music Awards	2005	Madonna	Best Live Performance Visiting Act	Nominated	
Meteor Ireland Music Awards	2006	Madonna	Best International Female	Nominated	
MidemNET Awards	2000	Madonna	Best Artist Site	Nominated	
Midem Videoclips Awards	1986	"Material Girl"	Best Female Performance	Won	
MM's Annual Music Awards	2002	"What It Feels Like for a Girl"	Best International Video	Nominated	
MTV Artist of the Decade Award	1989	Madonna	Artist of the Decade: Mega Artist	Honoree	
MTV Asia Awards	2002	Madonna	Favorite Female Artist	2nd place	
MTV Asia Awards	2006	Madonna	Favorite Female Artist	Nominated	
MTV Australia Awards	2006	Madonna	Best Female Artist	Nominated	
MTV Australia Awards	2006	Confessions on a Dance Floor	Album of the Year	Nominated	
MTV Australia Awards	2006	"Hung Up"	Best Dance Video	Nominated	
MTV Australia Awards	2006	"Hung Up"	Song of the Year	Nominated	
MTV Australia Awards	2006	"Hung Up"	Video of the Year	Nominated	
MTV Australia Awards	2009	"4 Minutes"	Best Moves	Nominated	
MTV Digital Days	2015	"Bitch I'm Madonna"	Best Innovative Video	Nominated	
MTV Europe Music Awards	1995	Madonna	Best Female	Nominated	
MTV Europe Music Awards	1996	"I Want You"	MTV Amour	Nominated	
MTV Europe Music Awards	1997	Madonna	Best Female	Nominated	
MTV Europe Music Awards	1998	Madonna	Best Dance	Nominated	
MTV Europe Music Awards	1998	Madonna	Best Female	Won	
MTV Europe Music Awards	1998	Ray of Light	Best Album	Won	
MTV Europe Music Awards	1999	Madonna	Best Female	Nominated	
MTV Europe Music Awards	1999	"Beautiful Stranger"	Best Song	Nominated	
MTV Europe Music Awards	2000	Madonna	Best Dance	Won	
MTV Europe Music Awards	2000	Madonna	Best Female	Won	
MTV Europe Music Awards	2000	"Music"	Best Song	Nominated	
MTV Europe Music Awards	2001	Madonna	Best Female	Nominated	
MTV Europe Music Awards	2001	Music	Best Album	Nominated	
MTV Europe Music Awards	2003	Madonna	Best Female	Nominated	
MTV Europe Music Awards	2003	www.madonna.com	Web Award	Nominated	
MTV Europe Music Awards	2006	Madonna	Best Female	Nominated	
MTV Europe Music Awards	2006	Madonna	Best Pop	Nominated	
MTV Europe Music Awards	2006	Confessions on a Dance Floor	Best Album	Nominated	
MTV Europe Music Awards	2008	"4 Minutes"	Best Video	Nominated	
MTV Millennial Awards	2015	Madonna's fall (at the 2015 Brit Awards)	#Epic Fail	Won	
MTV Movie Awards	1993	Body of Evidence	Most Desirable Female	Nominated	
MTV Movie Awards	1995	"I'll Remember"	Best Song from a Movie	Nominated	
MTV Movie Awards	1997	Evita	Best Female Performance	Nominated	
MTV Movie Awards	1997	"Don't Cry for Me Argentina"	Best Song from a Movie	Nominated	
MTV Pilipinas Music Award	2006	"Hung Up"	Favorite International Video	Nominated	
MTV Russia Music Awards	2004	Madonna	Best International Act	Nominated	
MTV Russia Music Awards	2006	Madonna	Best International Act	Nominated	
MTV Russia Music Awards	2006	"Hung Up"	Best Ringtone	Nominated	
MTV Southeast Asia	1999	Madonna	MTV Artist of the Millennium	Honoree	
MTV TRL Awards	2006	Madonna	Lifetime Achievement Award	Honoree	
MTV Video Music Awards	1984	"Borderline"	Best New Artist in a Video	Nominated	
MTV Video Music Awards	1985	"Like a Virgin"	Best Art Direction in a Video	Nominated	
MTV Video Music Awards	1985	"Like a Virgin"	Best Choreography in a Video	Nominated	
MTV Video Music Awards	1985	"Like a Virgin"	Best Cinematography in a Video	Nominated	
MTV Video Music Awards	1985	"Material Girl"	Best Choreography in a Video	Nominated	
MTV Video Music Awards	1985	"Material Girl"	Best Female Video	Nominated	
MTV Video Music Awards	1986	Madonna	Video Vanguard Award	Honoree	
MTV Video Music Awards	1986	"Dress You Up"	Best Choreography in a Video	Nominated	
MTV Video Music Awards	1986	"Like a Virgin" (live)	Best Choreography in a Video	Nominated	
MTV Video Music Awards	1987	"Open Your Heart"	Best Choreography in a Video	Nominated	
MTV Video Music Awards	1987	"Open Your Heart"	Best Art Direction in a Video	Nominated	
MTV Video Music Awards	1987	"Open Your Heart"	Best Female Video	Nominated	
MTV Video Music Awards	1987	"Papa Don't Preach"	Best Cinematography in a Video	Nominated	
MTV Video Music Awards	1987	"Papa Don't Preach"	Best Female Video	Won	
MTV Video Music Awards	1987	"Papa Don't Preach"	Best Overall Performance in a Video	Nominated	
MTV Video Music Awards	1989	"Express Yourself"	Best Art Direction in a Video	Won	
MTV Video Music Awards	1989	"Express Yourself"	Best Cinematography in a Video	Won	
MTV Video Music Awards	1989	"Express Yourself"	Best Direction in a Video	Won	
MTV Video Music Awards	1989	"Express Yourself"	Best Editing in a Video	Nominated	
MTV Video Music Awards	1989	"Express Yourself"	Best Female Video	Nominated	
MTV Video Music Awards	1989	"Like a Prayer"	Video of the Year	Nominated	
MTV Video Music Awards	1989	"Like a Prayer"	Viewer's Choice	Won	
MTV Video Music Awards	1990	"Vogue"	Best Art Direction in a Video	Nominated	
MTV Video Music Awards	1990	"Vogue"	Best Choreography in a Video	Nominated	
MTV Video Music Awards	1990	"Vogue"	Best Cinematography in a Video	Won	
MTV Video Music Awards	1990	"Vogue"	Best Dance Video	Nominated	
MTV Video Music Awards	1990	"Vogue"	Best Direction in a Video	Won	
MTV Video Music Awards	1990	"Vogue"	Best Editing in a Video	Won	
MTV Video Music Awards	1990	"Vogue"	Best Female Video	Nominated	
MTV Video Music Awards	1990	"Vogue"	Video of the Year	Nominated	
MTV Video Music Awards	1990	"Vogue"	Viewer's Choice	Nominated	
MTV Video Music Awards	1991	"Like a Virgin" (live)	Best Choreography in a Video	Nominated	
MTV Video Music Awards	1991	"Like a Virgin" (live)	Best Female Video	Nominated	
MTV Video Music Awards	1991	The Immaculate Collection	Best Long Form Video	Won	
MTV Video Music Awards	1992	"Holiday" (live)	Best Choreography in a Video	Nominated	
MTV Video Music Awards	1992	"Holiday" (live)	Best Dance Video	Nominated	
MTV Video Music Awards	1992	"Holiday" (live)	Best Female Video	Nominated	
MTV Video Music Awards	1993	"Rain"	Best Art Direction in a Video	Won	
MTV Video Music Awards	1993	"Rain"	Best Cinematography in a Video	Won	
MTV Video Music Awards	1994	"I'll Remember"	Best Video from a Film	Nominated	
MTV Video Music Awards	1995	"Human Nature"	Best Choreography in a Video	Nominated	
MTV Video Music Awards	1995	"Human Nature"	Best Dance Video	Nominated	
MTV Video Music Awards	1995	"Take a Bow"	Best Art Direction in a Video	Nominated	
MTV Video Music Awards	1995	"Take a Bow"	Best Female Video	Won	
MTV Video Music Awards	1996	"You'll See"	Best Cinematography in a Video	Nominated	
MTV Video Music Awards	1998	"Frozen"	Best Special Effects in a Video	Won	
MTV Video Music Awards	1998	"Ray of Light"	Best Choreography in a Video	Won	
MTV Video Music Awards	1998	"Ray of Light"	Best Cinematography in a Video	Nominated	
MTV Video Music Awards	1998	"Ray of Light"	Best Dance Video	Nominated	
MTV Video Music Awards	1998	"Ray of Light"	Best Direction in a Video	Won	
MTV Video Music Awards	1998	"Ray of Light"	Best Editing in a Video	Won	
MTV Video Music Awards	1998	"Ray of Light"	Best Female Video	Won	
MTV Video Music Awards	1998	"Ray of Light"	Breakthrough Video	Nominated	
MTV Video Music Awards	1998	"Ray of Light"	Video of the Year	Won	
MTV Video Music Awards	1999	"Beautiful Stranger"	Best Cinematography in a Video	Nominated	
MTV Video Music Awards	1999	"Beautiful Stranger"	Best Female Video	Nominated	
MTV Video Music Awards	1999	"Beautiful Stranger"	Best Video from a Film	Won	
MTV Video Music Awards	1999	"Nothing Really Matters"	Best Special Effects in a Video	Nominated	
MTV Video Music Awards	2000	"American Pie"	Best Cinematography in a Video	Nominated	
MTV Video Music Awards	2001	"Don't Tell Me"	Best Choreography in a Video	Nominated	
MTV Video Music Awards	2001	"Don't Tell Me"	Best Female Video	Nominated	
MTV Video Music Awards	2003	"Die Another Day"	Best Video from a Film	Nominated	
MTV Video Music Awards	2006	"Hung Up"	Best Choreography in a Video	Nominated	
MTV Video Music Awards	2006	"Hung Up"	Best Dance Video	Nominated	
MTV Video Music Awards	2006	"Hung Up"	Best Female Video	Nominated	
MTV Video Music Awards	2006	"Hung Up"	Best Pop Video	Nominated	
MTV Video Music Awards	2006	"Hung Up"	Video of the Year	Nominated	
MTV Video Music Awards	2008	"4 Minutes"	Best Dancing in a Video	Nominated	
MTV Video Music Awards	2022	Madame X	Best Longform Video	Nominated	
MTV Video Music Awards	2024	Madonna at the 1984 VMA	Most Iconic Performance	Nominated	
MTV Video Music Awards	2024	Madonna, Britney Spears, Christina Aguilera & Missy Elliott at the 2003 VMA	Most Iconic Performance	Nominated	
MTV Video Music Awards	2026	Madonna	Artist of the Year	Won	
MTV Video Music Awards	2026	Confessions II – The Film	Video of the Year	Nominated	
MTV Video Music Awards	2026	Confessions II – The Film	Best Dance	Won	
MTV Video Music Awards	2026	Confessions II – The Film	Best Direction	Nominated	
MTV Video Music Awards	2026	Confessions II – The Film	Best Art Direction	Nominated	
MTV Video Music Awards	2026	Confessions II – The Film	Best Cinematography	Won	
MTV Video Music Awards	2026	Confessions II – The Film	Best Editing	Nominated	
MTV Video Music Awards	2026	Confessions II – The Film	Best Choreography	Won	
MTV Video Music Awards	2026	Confessions II – The Film	Best Visual Effects	Nominated	
MTV Video Music Awards	2026	Confessions II – The Film	Best Long Form Video	Won	
MTV Video Music Awards	2026	"Bring Your Love" (with Sabrina Carpenter)	Song of the Year	Nominated	
MTV Video Music Awards	2026	"Bring Your Love" (with Sabrina Carpenter)	Best Collaboration	Won	
MTV Video Music Awards	2026	Confessions II	Best Album	Won	
MTV Video Music Brazil Awards	2004	"Me Against the Music" (Britney Spears featuring Madonna)	Best International Video	Nominated	
MTV Video Music Awards Japan	2003	"Die Another Day"	Best Video from a Film	Nominated	
MTV Video Music Awards Japan	2004	"Me Against the Music"	Best Female Video	Nominated	
MTV Video Music Awards Japan	2004	"Me Against the Music"	Best Collaboration	Nominated	
MTV Video Music Awards Japan	2006	"Hung Up"	Best Dance Video	Nominated	
MTV Video Music Awards Japan	2006	"Hung Up"	Best Female Video	Nominated	
MTV Video Music Awards Japan	2006	"Hung Up"	Video of the Year	Nominated	
MTV Video Music Awards Japan	2009	"4 Minutes"	Best Video from a Film	Nominated	
MTV Video Music Awards Japan	2009	"4 Minutes"	Best Collaboration	Nominated	
MTV Video Music Awards Japan	2015	"Bitch I'm Madonna"	Best Female Video	Nominated	
MTV Video Music Awards Japan	2026	"Bring Your Love" (with Sabrina Carpenter)	Best Collaboration Video (International)	Won	
MTV Video Music Awards Japan	2026	"Bring Your Love" (with Sabrina Carpenter)	Video of the Year	Nominated	
Much Music Video Awards	1995	"Bedtime Story"	Best International Video	Nominated	
Much Music Video Awards	1998	"Ray of Light"	Best International Video	Won	
Much Music Video Awards	1998	Madonna	Favourite International Artist	Nominated	
Much Music Video Awards	2006	"Hung Up"	Best International Video	Nominated	
Much Music Video Awards	2008	"4 Minutes"	Best International Video	Nominated	
Multishow Brazilian Music Awards	1996	Madonna	Best International Female Singer	Won	
Music City Record Distributors/Cat's Compact Discs & Cassettes Awards	1991	"Justify My Love"	Best Music Video — sales	Won	
Music Life Readers Poll Awards	1986	Madonna	Top Female Singer	Won	
Music Life Readers Poll Awards	1986	Madonna	Body of the Year	Won	
Music Life Readers Poll Awards	1986	Madonna	Best Dressed	Won	
Music Life Readers Poll Awards	1987	Madonna	Top Female Singer	Won	
Music Life Readers Poll Awards	1987	Madonna	Body of the Year	Won	
Music Life Readers Poll Awards	1987	Madonna	Best Dressed	Won	
Music Week Awards	1986	Madonna (with Stephen Bray) (Note: The pair co-produced and co-wrote "Each Time You Break My Heart", recorded by Nick Kamen)	Top Producer (Albums)	Won	
Music Week Awards	1986	Madonna (with Stephen Bray)	Top Producer (Singles)	Won	
Music Week Awards	1986	True Blue	Top Album	Won	
Music Week Awards	1986	Madonna Live: The Virgin Tour	Top Longform Music Video	2nd place	
Music Week Awards	1999	"Beautiful Stranger"	Airplay Award	Won	
Music & Media	1994	Madonna	Eurochart Artist of The Decade	Honoree	
Music & Media Pan-European Year-End Awards	1985	Madonna	Singles Selling Artist of the Year	Won	
Music & Media Pan-European Year-End Awards	1986	Madonna	Albums Selling Artist of the Year	Won	
Music & Media Pan-European Year-End Awards	1986	Madonna	Singles Selling Artist of the Year	Won	
Music & Media Pan-European Year-End Awards	1987	Madonna	Top Selling Albums Artist of the Year	Won	
Music & Media Pan-European Year-End Awards	1987	Madonna	Top Selling Singles Artist of the Year	Won	
Music & Media Pan-European Year-End Awards	1989	Madonna	Female Artist of the Year	2nd place	
Music & Media Pan-European Year-End Awards	1989	"Like a Prayer"	Top Selling Single of the Year	2nd place	
Music & Media Pan-European Year-End Awards	1989	Like a Prayer	Top Selling Album of the Year	3rd place	
Music & Media Pan-European Year-End Awards	1990	"Vogue"	Singles Sales Top 3	Runner-up	
Music & Media Pan-European Year-End Awards	1990	Madonna	Top 3 Female Artists (Singles)	Runner-up	
Music & Media Pan-European Year-End Awards	1991	Madonna	Top 3 Female Artists (Albums)	Won	
Music & Media Pan-European Year-End Awards	1991	Madonna	Top 3 Female Artists (Singles)	3rd Place	
Music & Media Pan-European Year-End Awards	1992	Madonna	Top 3 Female Artists (Singles)	Won	
Music & Media Pan-European Year-End Awards	1995	Madonna	Top 3 Female Artists (Singles)	3rd Place	
Music & Media Pan-European Year-End Awards	1997	Madonna	Top 3 Female Artists (Singles)	3rd Place	
Music & Media Pan-European Year-End Awards	1998	Madonna	Top 3 Female Artists (Albums)	Runner-up	
Music & Media Pan-European Year-End Awards	1998	Madonna	Top 3 Female Artists (Singles)	Runner-up	
Musica e Dischi Year-End Awards	1987	Madonna	Singles Selling Artist of the Year	Won	
Musica e Dischi Year-End Awards	1987	Madonna	Albums Selling Female Artist of the Year	Won	
Musica e Dischi Year-End Awards	1987	Madonna	Artist of the Year	Won	
Musician Awards	1989	Madonna	Artist of the Decade	Honoree	
MÜ-YAP Music Industry Awards	2009	Hard Candy	Top Selling Foreign Albums	Won	
MySpace Impact Award	2009	Raising Malawi	Impact Award	Won	
My VH1 Music Awards	2000	"Music"	Video of the Year	Nominated	
My VH1 Music Awards	2000	"Music"	Pushing the Envelope Video	Nominated	
My VH1 Music Awards	2000	Madonna	Woman of the Year	Nominated	
My VH1 Music Awards	2000	Madonna: Truth or Dare	Coolest Fan Web Site	Nominated	
Napster Awards	2006	Madonna	Most-Played Dance/Electronic Artist — U.S.	Won	
NARM Best Seller Awards	1985	Madonna	Best Selling Album by a New Artist	Won	
NARM Best Seller Awards	1985	Madonna	Best-selling Black Music Album by a Female Artist	Nominated	
NARM Best Seller Awards	1986	Madonna	Best Selling Video Cassette Merchandised as Music Video	Won	
NARM Best Seller Awards	1986	Like a Virgin	Best-selling Album by a Female Artist	Won	
NARM Best Seller Awards	1986	Madonna	Best Selling Female Artist	Won	
NARM Best Seller Awards	1987	True Blue	Best Selling Album by a Female Artist	Nominated	
NARM Best Seller Awards	1987	True Blue	Best Selling Album	Nominated	
NARM Best Seller Awards	1991	"Justify My Love"	Best Selling Music Video	Won	
NARM Best Seller Awards	1991	"Vogue"	Best Selling Single	Nominated	
National Music Publishers' Association	2008	"4 Minutes"	Songwriting Awards	Platinum	
National Music Publishers' Association	2021	"Mamacita"	Songwriting Awards	Platinum	
National Music Publishers' Association	2023	"Me Against the Music"	Songwriting Awards	Gold	
National Music Publishers' Association	2024	"Vogue"	Songwriting Awards	Platinum	
National Music Publishers' Association	2024	"Into the Groove"	Songwriting Awards	Gold	
National Society of Film Critics	1991	Madonna: Truth or Dare	Documentary	Runner-up	
New York Music Awards	1986	Madonna	Best Dance Music Vocalist	Won	
New York Music Awards	1986	Madonna	Best Female Vocalist	Nominated	
New York Music Awards	1986	Madonna	Act of the Year	Nominated	
Nickelodeon Kids' Choice Awards	1987	Madonna	Favorite Female Vocalist	Won	
Nickelodeon Kids' Choice Awards	1988	Madonna	Favorite Female Vocalist	Won	
Nickelodeon Kids' Choice Awards	1991	Madonna	Favorite Female Vocalist	Nominated	
Nickelodeon Kids' Choice Awards	2000	"Beautiful Stranger"	Favorite Song From a Movie	Nominated	
Nickelodeon Kids' Choice Awards	2026	"Bring Your Love" (with Sabrina Carpenter)	Favorite Music Collaboration	Nominated	
NME Awards	1992	Sex	Hype of the Year	Won	
NME Awards	2002	Madonna	Best Pop Act	Nominated	
NME Awards	2006	Madonna	Sexiest Woman	Won	
NME NetSounds Awards	2001	Brixton Academy concert webcast	Best Music Web Event	Won	
NRJ Music Awards	2001	Madonna	International Female Artist of the Year	Won	
NRJ Music Awards	2001	Music	International Album of the Year	Won	
NRJ Music Awards	2001	"Music"	International Song of the Year	Nominated	
NRJ Music Awards	2001	www.madonnamusic.com	International Website of the Year	Nominated	
NRJ Music Awards	2004	Madonna	NRJ Award of Honor	Honoree	
NRJ Music Awards	2004	Madonna	International Female Artist of the Year	Nominated	
NRJ Music Awards	2004	Madonna	Music Website of the Year	Nominated	
NRJ Music Awards	2004	American Life	International Album of the Year	Nominated	
NRJ Music Awards	2006	Madonna	International Female Artist of the Year	Won	
NRJ Music Awards	2007	Madonna	International Female Artist of the Year	Nominated	
NRJ Music Awards	2007	Confessions on a Dance Floor	International Album of the Year	Nominated	
NRJ Radio Awards (Nordic)	1999	Madonna	Best International Female Artist	Won	
NRJ Radio Awards (Nordic)	2001	Madonna	Best International Female Artist	Won	
Óčko Music Awards	2008	Madonna	Foreign Singer of the Year	Won	
Óčko Music Awards	2008	"4 Minutes"	Foreign Video of the Year	Nominated	
Orville H. Gibson Guitar Awards	2002	Madonna	Les Paul Horizon Award	Nominated	
People's Choice Awards	1986	Madonna	Favorite Female Musical Performer	Won	
People's Choice Awards	1987	Madonna	Favorite Female Musical Performer	Won	
People's Choice Awards	1990	Madonna	Favorite Female Musical Performer	Nominated	
People's Choice Awards	1991	Madonna	Favorite Female Musical Performer	Nominated	
People's Choice Awards	2004	"Me Against the Music"	Favorite Combined Forces	Nominated	
People's Choice Awards	2009	"4 Minutes"	Favorite Combined Forces	Nominated	
People's Choice Awards	2016	Madonna	Favorite Music Icon	Won	
People's Choice Awards	2016	Madonna	Favorite Female Artist	Nominated	
Pepsi-Cola Canada's Music Poll Sweepstakes	1986	Madonna	Best Female Artist	Won	
Perfect 10 Music Awards	1995	Madonna	Best Female Singer	Nominated	
Philippines Pride International Film Festival	2003	Madonna	Judy Award	Honoree	
Pink Paper Reader Awards	2006	Madonna at G-A-Y	Event of the Year	Won	
Pink Paper Reader Awards	2006	Madonna at G-A-Y	P.A. of the Year	Won	
Pollstar Awards	1984	Madonna	Which Artist is Most Likely to Successfully Headline Arenas for the First Time in 1985?	Nominated	
Pollstar Awards	1987	Who's That Girl World Tour	Most Creative Stage Set	Nominated	
Pollstar Awards	1990	Blond Ambition World Tour	Major Tour of the Year	Nominated	
Pollstar Awards	1990	Blond Ambition World Tour	Most Creative Stage Production	Won	
Pollstar Awards	1993	The Girlie Show World Tour	Most Creative Stage Production	Nominated	
Pollstar Awards	2001	Drowned World Tour	Major Tour of the Year	Nominated	
Pollstar Awards	2001	Drowned World Tour	Most Creative Stage Production	Nominated	
Pollstar Awards	2004	Re-Invention World Tour	Major Tour of the Year	Nominated	
Pollstar Awards	2004	Re-Invention World Tour	Most Creative Stage Production	Nominated	
Pollstar Awards	2006	Confessions Tour	Major Tour of the Year	Nominated	
Pollstar Awards	2006	Confessions Tour	Most Creative Stage Production	Won	
Pollstar Awards	2008	Sticky & Sweet Tour	Major Tour of the Year	Nominated	
Pollstar Awards	2008	Sticky & Sweet Tour	Most Creative Stage Production	Nominated	
Pollstar Awards	2013	The MDNA Tour	Most Creative Stage Production	Nominated	
Pollstar Awards	2021	Madonna	Pop Touring Artist of the Decade	Nominated	
Pop Corn Awards (Note: According to Billboard, an award given by Greek teenage pop magazine Popcorn and broadcast on Mega Channel.)	2000	Music	Best Foreign Album	Won	
Pop Corn Awards	2000	"Music"	Best International Single	Won	
Pop Corn Awards	2000	"Music"	Best International Video	Won	
Pop Corn Awards	2000	Madonna	Best Foreign Female Singer	Won	
Pop/Rocky	1985	Madonna	Goldener Hammerschlumpf – Singer of the Year	Gold	
Pop/Rocky	1985	Madonna	Goldener Hammerschlumpf – Film Star of the Year	Gold	
Porin Awards	1999	"Frozen"	Best International Video	Won	
Porin Awards	1999	Ray of Light	Best International Album	Won	
Porin Awards	2001	"Music"	Best International Video	Nominated	
Porin Awards	2001	Music	Best International Pop/Rock Album	Nominated	
Prêmio Claro Música (Note: The Prêmio Claro Música de Melhores do Ano is a Brazilian music award organized by Claro Música. The 2026 edition features public voting to select six finalists in each category, followed by an evaluation by the Claro Música Academy to determine the winners.)	2026	Confessions II	International Album of the Year	Pending	
Premios Amigo	2000	Madonna	Best International Female Solo Artist	Won	
Premios Amigo	2000	Music	Best International Album	Nominated	
Premio Esaem (Note: An award given by the High School of Performing Arts in Málaga, Spain)	2018	Madonna	Special award	Honoree	
Premio Italiano della Musica	1999	Ray of Light	Best International Album	Nominated	
Premios Juventud	2023	"Hung Up on Tokischa"	Girl Power	Nominated	
Premios Mixup	2001	Madonna	English-language Female Artist	Nominated	
Premios MTV Latino	1996	"Verás"	Best Female Video	Won	
Premios MTV Latino	1996	"Verás"	Best Cinematography	Won	
Premios MTV Latinoamérica	2003	Madonna	Best Pop Artist — International	Nominated	
Premios MTV Latinoamérica	2006	Madonna	Best Pop Artist — International	Nominated	
Premios MTV Latinoamérica	2006	"Hung Up"	Song of the Year	Nominated	
Premios MTV Latinoamérica	2008	Madonna	Best Pop Artist — International	Nominated	
Premios MTV Latinoamérica	2008	"4 Minutes"	Best Ringtone	Nominated	
Premios Oye!	2003	Madonna	Best English Female Artist	Nominated	
Premios Oye!	2006	"Hung Up"	English Song of the Year	Nominated	
Premios Oye!	2008	"4 Minutes"	Record of the Year	Won	
Premios Oye!	2008	Hard Candy	Album of the Year	Won	
Premios Oye!	2010	Sticky & Sweet Tour	Album of the Year	Nominated	
Premios Shangay	2003	American Life	Best International Album	Nominated	
Premios Shangay	2003	Madonna	Best International Artist	Nominated	
Prestige Hong Kong Beauty and Spa Awards	2018	MDNA Skin Onyx Black Roller	Skincare: Gadget	Won	
PureChart Awards	2024	The Celebration Tour	Best Tour of the Year	Nominated	
Q Awards	2001	Madonna	Best Live Act	Nominated	
Q Awards	2004	Madonna	Best Live Act	Nominated	
Q Awards	2011	Madonna	Greatest Act of the Last 25 Years	Nominated	
QV Readers' Choice Awards (Note: QV was an American magazine covering LGBT issues, launched in 1997.)	2000	Madonna	Favorite Female Singer	Won	
Queerties Awards	2012	Madonna vs. Lady Gaga	Celebrity Beef of the Year	Nominated	
Queerties Awards	2012	Elton John vs. Madonna	Celebrity Beef of the Year	Nominated	
Queerties Awards	2024	Elton John vs. Madonna	Celebrity Beef of the Year	Nominated	
Queerties Awards	2024	"Vulgar"	Best Anthem	Nominated	
Queerties Awards	2026	Confessions II	Next Big Thing	Nominated	
Radio Academy Honours (Note: Known as Radio Academy Honours, the category in which Madonna was nominated, is The Music Control Award.)	2000	Madonna	Most Played Artist	Nominated	
Radio Galgalatz	1990	Madonna	Female Artist of the Decade	Honoree	
Radio Galgalatz	2000	Madonna	Female Artist of the Decade	Honoree	
Radio Music Awards	2000	"Music"	Song of the Year/Pop Alternative Radio	Nominated	
Radio Music Awards	2001	Madonna	Artist of the Year/Pop Alternative Radio	Nominated	
Radio Tel Aviv	1999	Madonna	Female Artist of the Millennium	Honoree	
Record Mirror Readers Poll	1985	Madonna	Best Female Singer	Won	
Record Mirror Readers Poll	1985	Madonna	Definitive Goddess Award	Won	
Record Mirror Readers Poll	1985	Like a Virgin	Favorite Album	3rd place	
Record Mirror Readers Poll	1985	Like a Virgin	Most Tasteful Album Sleeve	2nd place	
Record Mirror Readers Poll	1985	"Into the Groove"	Favorite Single	10th place	
Record Mirror Readers Poll	1986	Madonna	Best Female Artist	Won	
Record Mirror Readers Poll	1986	Madonna	Best Actress	3rd place	
Record Mirror Readers Poll	1986	Madonna	Best Dance Act	10th place	
Record Mirror Readers Poll	1986	Madonna	Dickhead of the Year	6th place	
Record Mirror Readers Poll	1986	Madonna	Best Buttocks	Won	
Record Mirror Readers Poll	1986	Madonna	Best Thing About 1986	6th place	
Record Mirror Readers Poll	1986	Madonna	Worst Thing About 1986	Won	
Record Mirror Readers Poll	1986	Madonna	Diamond Geezer/Gal	Won	
Record Mirror Readers Poll	1986	True Blue	Best Album	2nd place	
Record Mirror Readers Poll	1986	"Papa Don't Preach"	Best Single	2nd place	
Record Mirror Readers Poll	1986	"Papa Don't Preach"	Best Video	3th place	
Rhino Awards	1991	Madonna	Warren Beatty Award	Won	
Rhino Awards	1991	"Justify My Love"	Imelda Marcos Award	Won	
Rhino Awards	1991	"Justify My Love"	Carl Douglas Award	Won	
Rockbjörnen	1989	Madonna	Best International Artist	Won	
Rockbjörnen	1989	Like a Prayer	Best International Album	Won	
Rockbjörnen	1992	Madonna	Best International Artist	Won	
Rockbjörnen	1998	Madonna	Best International Artist	Won	
Rockbjörnen	1998	Ray of Light	Best International Album	Won	
Rockbjörnen	2005	Confessions on a Dance Floor	Best International Album	Won	
Rockopop	1991	Madonna	Best International Artist	Won	
Rock Express (Canada) (Note: Awards given by Rock Express, then Canada's largest pop music magazine according to Toronto Star.)	1987	Madonna	Best International Female Vocalist	Won	
Rock Express (Canada)	1988	Madonna	Best International Female Vocalist	Won	
Rockol Awards	2012	MDNA	Best Foreign Album	3rd place	
Rockol Awards	2015	Madonna	Best Concert of Festival	Nominated	
Rolling Stone Music Awards (Note: Also known as Rolling Stone Readers and Critics awards. It was until 1998 when the magazine gave an actual trophy since Reader's and Critic's choices in 1968. Therefore, only awards and nominations from 1998 and onwards are listed.)	1998	"Ray of Light"	Best Single	4th place	
Rolling Stone Music Awards	1998	"Ray of Light"	Best Video	Nominated	
Rolling Stone Music Awards	1998	"Ray of Light"	Best Single: Readers' Choice	Nominated	
Rolling Stone Music Awards	1998	"Ray of Light"	Best Video: Readers' Choice	Nominated	
Rolling Stone Music Awards	1998	Madonna	Best Female Artist	Nominated	
Rolling Stone Music Awards	1998	Madonna	Best Dance/Electronic Artist: Readers' Choice	Won	
Rolling Stone Music Awards	1998	Madonna	Best Female Artist: Readers' Choice	Won	
Rolling Stone Music Awards	1998	Madonna	Artist of the Year: Readers' Choice	Nominated	
Rolling Stone Music Awards	1998	Madonna	Best Dressed: Readers' Choice	Nominated	
Rolling Stone Music Awards	1999	"Beautiful Stranger"	Best Single	Nominated	
Rolling Stone Music Awards	2000	Madonna	Best Female Artist	Won	
Rolling Stone Music Awards	2000	"Music"	Best Single	Won	
Rolling Stone Music Awards	2003	Madonna and Britney Spears' kiss at 2003 VMA	Year's Biggest Hype	2nd place	
RTHK International Pop Poll Awards	1992	Madonna	Pop Vocal Female	Nominated	
RTHK International Pop Poll Awards	1993	Erotica	Top Selling English Album	Won	
RTHK International Pop Poll Awards	2000	Madonna	Top Female Artist	Won	
RTHK International Pop Poll Awards	2000	"American Pie"	Top Movie Song	Won	
RTHK International Pop Poll Awards	2000	"American Pie"	Top Remake	Won	
RTHK International Pop Poll Awards	2000	"Beautiful Stranger"	Top Ten English Gold Song	Won	
RTHK International Pop Poll Awards	2000	"Beautiful Stranger"	Super Gold Song	Won	
RTHK International Pop Poll Awards	2001	"Music"	Top Ten English Gold Songs	Won	
RTHK International Pop Poll Awards	2001	"American Pie"	Top Ten English Gold Songs	Won	
RTHK International Pop Poll Awards	2001	"American Pie"	Super Gold Song	Won	
RTHK International Pop Poll Awards	2001	Madonna	Top Female Artist	Won	
RTHK International Pop Poll Awards	2002	Madonna	Top Female Artist	Nominated	
RTHK International Pop Poll Awards	2003	"Die Another Day"	Top Ten International Gold Songs	Won	
RTHK International Pop Poll Awards	2003	"Die Another Day"	Top Movie Song	Nominated	
RTHK International Pop Poll Awards	2003	Madonna	Top Female Artist	Nominated	
RTHK International Pop Poll Awards	2004	"Me Against the Music"	Top Ten International Gold Songs	Won	
RTHK International Pop Poll Awards	2004	"Hollywood"	Top Ten International Gold Songs	Nominated	
RTHK International Pop Poll Awards	2006	"Hung Up"	Top Ten International Gold Songs	Won	
RTHK International Pop Poll Awards	2006	Madonna	Top Female Artist	Silver	
RTHK International Pop Poll Awards	2007	"Sorry"	Top Ten International Gold Songs	Won	
RTHK International Pop Poll Awards	2007	Madonna	Top Female Artist	Gold	
RTHK International Pop Poll Awards	2009	"4 Minutes"	Top Ten International Gold Songs	Won	
RTHK International Pop Poll Awards	2009	"Give It 2 Me"	Top Ten International Gold Songs	Nominated	
RTHK International Pop Poll Awards	2009	Madonna	Top Female Artist	Gold	
RTHK International Pop Poll Awards	2009	"American Pie"	20th Anniversary Supreme Golden Song	Nominated	
RTHK International Pop Poll Awards	2009	Hard Candy	Best-Selling English Album of the Year	Won	
RTHK International Pop Poll Awards	2010	"Celebration"	Top Ten International Gold Songs	Nominated	
RTHK International Pop Poll Awards	2010	Madonna	Top Female Artist	Nominated	
RTHK International Pop Poll Awards	2013	"Girl Gone Wild"	Top Ten International Gold Songs	Nominated	
RTHK International Pop Poll Awards	2015	"Living for Love"	Top Ten International Gold Songs	Nominated	
RTHK International Pop Poll Awards	2016	"Ghosttown"	Top Ten International Gold Songs	Nominated	
RTHK International Pop Poll Awards	2016	Madonna	Top Female Artist	Bronze	
Satellite Awards	2003	"Die Another Day"	Best Original Song	Nominated	
Saturn Awards	1991	Dick Tracy	Best Actress	Nominated	
SER FM Awards	1991	"Vogue"	Best Disco Single	Won	
Shape Readers Choice Awards	2000	Madonna	Role Model (Fitness)	3rd place	
Shape Readers Choice Awards	2002	Madonna	Most Popular Fitness Role Model	Won	
Shorty Awards	2018	MDNA Skin	Branded Content	Won	
Sky Pop Video Awards	1985	"Like a Virgin"	Best Female Video	Won	
Smash Hits Poll Winners Party	1985	Madonna	Best Female Solo Singer	Won	
Smash Hits Poll Winners Party	1985	Madonna	Most Attractive Female	Won	
Smash Hits Poll Winners Party	1985	Madonna and Sean Penn's Wedding	The Non-Event of the Year	Won	
Smash Hits Poll Winners Party	1985	Like a Virgin	Best Album	Won	
Smash Hits Poll Winners Party	1986	Madonna	Best Female Solo Singer	Won	
Smash Hits Poll Winners Party	1986	Madonna	Most Attractive Female	Won	
Smash Hits Poll Winners Party	1986	True Blue	Best Album	Won	
Smash Hits Poll Winners Party	1987	Madonna	Best Female Solo Singer	Won	
Smash Hits Poll Winners Party	1987	Madonna	Most Attractive Female	Won	
Smash Hits Poll Winners Party	1989	"Like a Prayer"	Best Pop Video	Nominated	
Smash Hits Poll Winners Party	1989	"Express Yourself"	Best Pop Video	Nominated	
Smash Hits Poll Winners Party	1990	Madonna	Best Female Solo Singer	Won	
Smash Hits Poll Winners Party	1990	Madonna	Most Fanciable Female	Won	
Smash Hits Poll Winners Party	1991	Madonna	Best Female Solo Singer	Won	
Smash Hits Poll Winners Party	1991	Madonna	Most Fanciable Female	Won	
Smash Hits Poll Winners Party	1992	Madonna	Best Female Solo Singer	Won	
Smash Hits Poll Winners Party	1992	Madonna	Most Fanciable Female	Won	
Smash Hits Poll Winners Party	1993	Madonna	Best Female Solo Singer	2nd place	
Smash Hits Poll Winners Party	1993	Madonna	Worst Female Singer	Won	
Smash Hits Poll Winners Party	1993	Madonna	Worst Film Actress	Won	
Smash Hits Poll Winners Party	1993	Madonna	Worst Dressed Person	Won	
Smash Hits Poll Winners Party	1993	Madonna	Least Fanciable Female	Won	
Smash Hits Poll Winners Party	1994	Madonna	Best Female Solo Singer	Nominated	
Smash Hits Poll Winners Party	1994	Madonna	Most Attractive Female	Nominated	
Smash Hits Poll Winners Party	1994	Madonna	Worst Female Singer	Nominated	
Smash Hits Poll Winners Party	1994	Madonna	Worst Female Actress/Actor	Won	
Smash Hits Poll Winners Party	1994	Madonna	Least Fanciable Female	Won	
Smash Hits Poll Winners Party	1994	Madonna	Worst Dressed Person	Won	
Smash Hits Poll Winners Party	1996	Madonna	Best Female Solo Singer	Nominated	
Smash Hits Poll Winners Party	1996	Madonna	Worst Female Singer	Nominated	
Smash Hits Poll Winners Party	2000	Madonna	Best Female Solo Singer	Nominated	
Smash Hits Poll Winners Party	2003	Madonna (Note: Shared with Christina Aguilera and Britney Spears)	Pop Snog of the Year	Won	
Space Shower Music Video Awards	2006	"Hung Up"	Best International Video	Won	
Stinkers Bad Movie Awards	1993	Body of Evidence	Worst Actress	Nominated	
Stinkers Bad Movie Awards	2000	The Next Best Thing	Worst Actress	Won	
Stinkers Bad Movie Awards	2000	The Next Best Thing	Musicians and Athletes Who Shouldn't Be Acting	Won	
Stinkers Bad Movie Awards	2000	"American Pie"	Worst Song	Nominated	
Stinkers Bad Movie Awards	2002	Swept Away	Worst Actress	Won	
Stinkers Bad Movie Awards	2002	Swept Away	Worst On Screen Couple (Note: Shared with Adriano Giannini.)	Won	
Stinkers Bad Movie Awards	2002	Die Another Day	Worst Supporting Actress	Won	
Stinkers Bad Movie Awards	2002	Die Another Day	Most Distracting Celebrity Cameo Appearance	Nominated	
Stinkers Bad Movie Awards	2002	"Die Another Day"	Worst Song or Song Performance in a film or its end credits	Nominated	
TEC Awards	2001	Music	Outstanding Creative Achievement – Record Production/Album	Nominated	
TEC Awards	2001	"Music"	Outstanding Creative Achievement – Record Production/Single	Won	
TEC Awards	2002	Madonna	Outstanding Creative Achievement – Tour Production	Nominated	
TEC Awards	2002	Drowned World Tour	Outstanding Creative Achievement – Remote Production/Recording or Broadcast	Nominated	
Teen Choice Awards	1999	"Beautiful Stranger"	Choice Summer Song	Nominated	
Teen Choice Awards	2008	"4 Minutes"	Choice Music: Single	Nominated	
Teen Choice Awards	2008	"4 Minutes"	Choice Music: Hook-Up	Nominated	
Teen People Reader's Choice Awards	2003	Madonna and Missy Elliott	Best Pitch Person	Won	
Teen People Reader's Choice Awards	2003	"American Life"	Best Song Lyric	Nominated	
Telegatto Awards	1992	Madonna	Best International Artist	Won	
Theatregoers' Choice Awards	2003	Up for Grabs	Theatre Event of the Year	Won	
The Record of the Year	2008	"4 Minutes"	Record of the Year	2nd place	
TMF Awards (Belgium)	2006	Madonna	Best International Dance Act	Nominated	
TMF Awards (Netherlands) (Note: Also known as TMF-Nokia Awards)	2001	Music	Best International Album	Nominated	
TMF Awards (Netherlands)	2002	"What It Feels Like for a Girl"	Best International Video	Nominated	
Tokio Hot 100 Awards	2004	Madonna	Best Female Artist	Nominated	
Tokio Hot 100 Awards	2005	Madonna	Best Female Artist	Won	
Tokio Hot 100 Awards	2005	"Hung Up"	Best Song	3rd place	
Tokio Hot 100 Awards	2009	Madonna	Best Female Artist	Nominated	
Tokio Hot 100 Awards	2010	"Celebration"	Best Song	Nominated	
Top of the Pops Awards	2001	Madonna	Best Pop Act	Nominated	
Top of the Pops Awards	2001	Drowned World Tour	Best Tour	Nominated	
Top of the Pops Awards	2005	Madonna	Singer of the Year	Nominated	
Top of the Pops Awards	2005	"Hung Up"	Song of the Year	2nd place	
Top of the Pops Awards	2005	"Hung Up"	Video of the Year	Won	
UK Music Video Awards	2009	Sticky & Sweet Tour	Best Live Music Coverage	Nominated	
UK Music Video Awards	2019	"Dark Ballet"	Best Pop Video – International	Nominated	
UK Music Video Awards	2026	Confessions II	Best Pop Video – International	Nominated	
UK Music Video Awards	2026	Confessions II	Best Special Visual Project	Nominated	
UK Music Video Awards	2026	Confessions II	Best Cinematography in a Video	Nominated	
Urban Music Awards (Latin America)	2019	"Medellín"	Best Collaboration	Nominated	
VH1 Do Something! Awards	2010	I Am Because We Are	Docu Style Award	Won	
VH1/Vogue Fashion Awards	1995	Madonna	Most Fashionable Artist	Won	
VH1/Vogue Fashion Awards	1995	Madonna	Viewer's Choice: Most Fashionable Artist	Won	
VH1/Vogue Fashion Awards	1998	Madonna	Most Fashionable Artist	Won	
VH1/Vogue Fashion Awards	1998	Madonna	Most Stylish Music Artist	Won	
VH1/Vogue Fashion Awards	1998	"Ray of Light"	Most Stylish Music Video	Nominated	
VH1/Vogue Fashion Awards	1998	Madonna	The Versace Award	Honoree	
VH1/Vogue Fashion Awards	1999	Madonna	Most Fashionable Artist	Nominated	
VH1/Vogue Fashion Awards	1999	"Beautiful Stranger"	Most Stylish Video	Nominated	
VH1/Vogue Fashion Awards	2000	"Music"	Visionary Video	Nominated	
Video Awards Gala (Note: According to RPM, a Canadian award created by Premiere Video magazine's founder, Salah Bachir and sponsored by Warner Home Video, MCA Home Video, Focus on Video and Fox Video.)	1991	The Immaculate Collection	Best Music Video	Won	
Video Awards Gala	1992	Madonna: Truth or Dare	Best Documentary	Won	
Virgin Media Music Awards (Note: Previously called Virgin.net Awards)	2005	"Hung Up"	Best Single	Won	
Virgin Media Music Awards	2005	Confessions on a Dance Floor	Best Album	2nd place	
Virgin Media Music Awards	2005	Madonna	Best Solo Artist	Won	
Virgin Media Music Awards	2006	Madonna	Best Solo Artist	Won	
Virgin Media Music Awards	2008	Madonna	Best International Act	Nominated	
Virgin Media Music Awards	2008	Madonna	Best Comeback	Nominated	
Virgin Media Music Awards	2008	"4 Minutes"	Best Track	Nominated	
Virgin Media Music Awards	2008	Hard Candy	Best Album	Nominated	
Virgin Media Music Awards	2009	Madonna	Best Solo Female	Nominated	
VIVA Comet Awards	1998	Madonna	International Act	Won	
VIVA Comet Awards	2001	Madonna	International Act	Nominated	
VIVA Comet Awards	2001	"Don't Tell Me"	International Video	Nominated	
Vota la voce	1987	Madonna	Best International Artist	Won	
VSDA Awards	1986	Madonna Live: The Virgin Tour	Most Popular Music Video Performance	Won	
VSDA Awards	1992	Madonna: Truth or Dare	Homer Awards: Documentary	Won	
Webby Awards	2016	Madonna.com	General Website/Celebrity/Fan	Won	
Webby Awards	2017	Madonna.com	Websites and Mobile Sites, Music	Won	
WH Smith Literary Award	2003	The English Roses	Children's Book of the Year	Shortlisted	
Women's Weekly Singapore	2020	MDNA Skin: The Serum	Best Serum - Firming (Splurge)	Won	
Woolmark Award	1992	Madonna	For dramatizing the versatility of men's style	Honoree	
World Music Awards	2006	Madonna	World's Best Pop Artist	Won	
World Music Awards	2008	Madonna	Best Selling American Artist	Won	
World Music Video Awards (Note: According to Music & Media, it was an award organized by the International Federation of Music Television Channels and sponsored by Coca-Cola, later by Pepsi.)	1986	"Papa Don't Preach"	America's Favorite Video	Won	
World Music Video Awards	1986	"Papa Don't Preach"	World's Favorite Video	Won	
World Soundtrack Awards	2012	"Masterpiece"	Best Original Song Written Directly for a Film	Nominated	
XM Nation Music Awards	2005	Madonna	Icon: 1980s	Honoree	
ZAZ Awards (South Africa)	2001	"Music"	International Video of the Year	Nominated	
ZD Awards	2012	The MDNA Tour	Foreign Tour of the Year	Nominated	
ZD Awards	2012	Madonna in Russia	Event of the Year	Nominated	
ZD Awards	2012	Madonna	Best Foreign Act	Nominated	
ZD Awards	2015	Madonna	Best Foreign Act	3rd place	
Žebřík Music Awards	1996	Madonna	Best International Female	5th place	
Žebřík Music Awards	1998	Madonna	Best International Female	Silver	
Žebřík Music Awards	1998	Madonna	Best International Personality	Nominated	
Žebřík Music Awards	1999	Madonna	Best International Personality	Nominated	
Žebřík Music Awards	1999	Madonna	Best International Female	Bronze	
Žebřík Music Awards	2000	Madonna	Best International Female	Won	
Žebřík Music Awards	2000	Madonna	Best International Personality	Bronze	
Žebřík Music Awards	2000	Madonna	Best International Průser	Nominated	
Žebřík Music Awards	2000	Music	Best International Album	Nominated	
Žebřík Music Awards	2000	"Music"	Best International Song	Bronze	
Žebřík Music Awards	2000	"Music"	Best International Video	Nominated	
Žebřík Music Awards	2001	Madonna	Best International Female	Silver	
Žebřík Music Awards	2001	Madonna	Best International Personality	Bronze	
Žebřík Music Awards	2002	Madonna	Best International Personality	Nominated	
Žebřík Music Awards	2002	Madonna	Best International Female	Bronze	
Žebřík Music Awards	2002	"Die Another Day"	Best International Video	5th place	
Žebřík Music Awards	2003	Madonna	Best International Female	Silver	
Žebřík Music Awards	2005	Madonna	Best International Female	Silver	
Žebřík Music Awards	2005	Madonna	Best International Personality	Bronze	
Žebřík Music Awards	2005	Madonna	Best International Průser	Bronze	
Žebřík Music Awards	2005	Madonna	Best International Surprise	5th place	
Žebřík Music Awards	2005	"Hung Up"	Best International Song	4th place	
Žebřík Music Awards	2005	"Hung Up"	Best International Video	5th place	
Žebřík Music Awards	2006	Madonna	Best International Female	Won	
Žebřík Music Awards	2006	Madonna	Best International Průser	Nominated	
Žebřík Music Awards	2006	Confessions on a Dance Floor	Best International Album	5th place	
Žebřík Music Awards	2006	"Sorry"	Best International Song	Nominated	
Žebřík Music Awards	2006	"Jump"	Best International Video	Nominated	
Žebřík Music Awards	2006	I'm Going to Tell You a Secret	Best International Music DVD	Nominated	
Žebřík Music Awards	2007	The Confessions Tour	Best International Music DVD	Won	
Žebřík Music Awards	2007	Madonna	Best International Female	4th place	
Žebřík Music Awards	2008	Madonna	Best International Female	Silver	
Žebřík Music Awards	2008	Hard Candy	Best International Album	4th place	
Žebřík Music Awards	2008	"4 Minutes"	Best International Song	4th place	
Žebřík Music Awards	2008	"4 Minutes"	Best International Video	Bronze	
Žebřík Music Awards	2009	Madonna	Best International Female	Nominated	
Zest Star Body Awards	2003	Madonna	Lifetime Achievement	Honoree	

== Other accolades ==
=== Induction honors ===
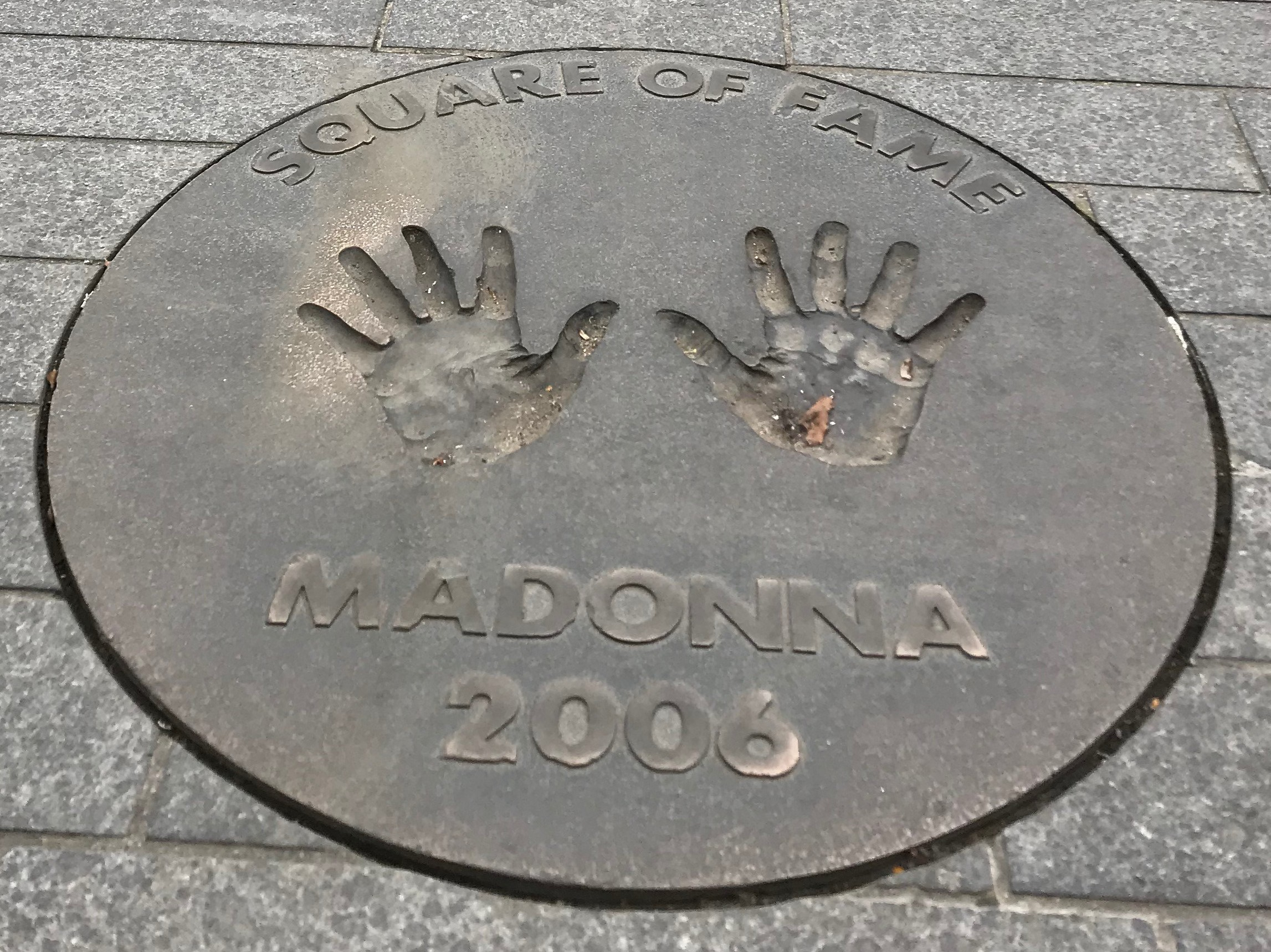
Madonna's handprints at Wembley Square of Fame. She is the first person to be inducted.

Organization	Year	Honor	Work	Result	Ref
Goldmine Hall of Fame	2012	Hall of Fame (Performer)	—N/a	Inducted	
Goldmine Hall of Fame	2016	Hall of Fame (Songwriter)	—N/a	Inducted	
The Headwear Association (Note: The Headwear Association Hall of Fame (THA), recognized individuals renowned for wearing hats.)	2009	Headwear Association Hall of Fame	—N/a	Inducted	
Hollywood Walk of Fame	1990	Hollywood Walk of Fame star	—N/a	Rejected (Note: Madonna turned down the nomination.)	
Michigan Rock and Roll Legends Hall (Note: Created by Rock and Roll historian Gary Johnson, in 2005.)	2006	Michigan Rock and Roll Legends Hall	—N/a	Inducted	
National Recording Registry	2023	National Recording Registry	Like a Virgin	Inducted	
Playboy Music Hall of Fame	1988	Playboy Music Hall of Fame	—N/a	Inducted	
Rock and Roll Hall of Fame	2008	Rock and Roll Hall of Fame	—N/a	Inducted	
Songwriters Hall of Fame	2014	Songwriters Hall of Fame	—N/a	Nominated	
Songwriters Hall of Fame	2016	Songwriters Hall of Fame	—N/a	Nominated	
Songwriters Hall of Fame	2017	Songwriters Hall of Fame	—N/a	Nominated	
Traverse City Film Festival	2016	Traverse City Film Festival Walk of Fame	—N/a	Inducted	
UK Music Hall of Fame	2004	UK Music Hall of Fame	—N/a	Inducted	
Wembley Arena Square of Fame	2006	Wembley Arena Square of Fame bronze	—N/a	Inducted	

=== State honors ===
Country	Year	Honor	Ref.
Argentina	2012	Guest of Honor of Palermo, Buenos Aires	
Brazil	2024	Honorary citizenship provided for her The Celebration Tour in Rio de Janeiro	
India	2008	Guest of Honor of Kingdom of Marwar	
Italy	1987	Honorary citizenship of Pacentro	
Mexico	2010	Key to the city of Mexico City	
Scotland	2000	Honorary title Daughter-in-Law of the Seaforth Highlanders Regiment during her marriage to Guy Ritchie	
United States	1985 (Note: Offered by at least three different mayors in 1985, 1991, and 2008)	Key to the city of Bay City (offered three times)	
United States	1988	Key to the city of New Jersey (only oferred)	
United States	1992	Key to the city of Portland	

=== Guinness World Records ===
As of 2022, Madonna has acquired 45 Guinness World Records.

Year the record was awarded, title of the record, and the record holder
Year	Record	Record holder	Ref.
1987	Most Successful Female Songwriter in the UK	Madonna	
1987	Most Successful Singer	Madonna	
1987	Leading Female Vocalist	Madonna	
1991	Best-Selling Album by a Woman	True Blue	
1991	Most No. 1 Single for a Female Artist in the US	Madonna	
1992	Number One in Most Countries (Note: When Madonna was awarded the Most Successful Singer in 1987, Guinness World Records had already mentioned that True Blue was "a number one LP in 28 countries—a totally unprecedented achievement". It was listed as a separate record entry in 1992.)	True Blue	
1993	Largest Contract for a Female Musician	Madonna	
1997	Most Changes of Costume	Madonna in Evita	
1997	Most Consecutive Top Ten Hits in the UK	Madonna	
1997	Most Multi-Platinum Albums by a Female Artist	Madonna	
1998	Most Paid Item of Clothing	Madonna's corset designed by Jean Paul Gaultier	
1998	Most Successful Female Artist	Madonna	
1998	Biggest-Selling Album in the UK by a Female Soloist	The Immaculate Collection	
1998	Most Consecutive Top Five Singles in the US	Madonna	
1998	Most Dance Club Play No. 1 Singles in the US	Madonna	
1998	Most No. 1 Hits on the US 12-Inch Dance Singles Chart	Madonna	
1999	Most MTV Video Music Awards Won by a Female Artist	Madonna	
2000	Most Dance Club Play Singles	Madonna	
2001	Largest Internet Concert	Madonna at the Brixton Academy	
2002	Most Valuable Denim Jacket	Madonna's jacket for a photo shoot by Marcus Leatherdale	
2002	Best-Selling DVD Single	"What It Feels Like for a Girl"	
2003	Most US Top 40 Singles Entries by a Female Artist	Madonna	
2006	Highest Annual Earnings by a Female Singer	Madonna	
2006	Most Charts Topped Worldwide by an Album	Confessions on a Dance Floor	
2006	Most UK No. 1 Singles by a Female Artist	Madonna	
2006	Oldest Artist to Simultaneously Top the UK Singles and Albums Charts	Madonna	
2007	Most No. 1 Albums by a Female Artist in the UK	Madonna	
2007	Highest-Grossing Music Tour per Concert by a Female Artist	Confessions Tour	
2008	Most Simultaneous No.1s on the UK Official Singles and Official Albums Charts by a Female Artist	Madonna	
2008	Most Cumulative Weeks at No.1 on the UK Official Singles Chart by a Female Artist	Madonna	
2009	Most US Top 10 Entries	Madonna	
2009	Longest Run of UK Top 20 Hits by a Solo Artist	Madonna	
2009	Most Top 10 Entries on the UK's Official Singles Chart by a Female Artist	Madonna	
2010	Biggest-Selling Female Album Act of the 21st Century (UK)	Madonna	
2010	Top-Selling Female Recording Artist	Madonna	
2010	Most Successful Tour (Solo Artist)	Sticky & Sweet Tour	
2011	Most US No. 1 Music Videos	Madonna	
2012	Biggest TV Audience for a Super Bowl Act	Madonna at the Super Bowl XLVI halftime show	
2012	Most UK No. 1 Albums by a Solo Artist	Madonna	
2015	Highest-Grossing Music Tour by a Female	Sticky & Sweet Tour	
2018	Most Remixed Act	Madonna	
2020	First Act to Have 50 US No. 1s on one Billboard Chart	Madonna	
2021	Highest-Ranked Female on Billboard's "Greatest of All Time Hot 100 Artists" Chart	Madonna	
2022	Highest-Grossing Female Touring Artist	Madonna	
2022	Most Tickets Sold by a Female Touring Artist	Madonna	

== See also ==
- International Best Dressed Hall of Fame List
