= List of artists with the most UK singles chart top tens =

The UK singles chart is a weekly record chart which for most of its history was based on single sales from Sunday to Saturday in the United Kingdom. The chart was founded in 1952 by Percy Dickins of New Musical Express (NME), who telephoned 20 record stores to record their ten highest-selling singles were. Dickins aggregated the results into a top twelve hit parade. NME's chart was published each week in its eponymous magazine. From 2004, music downloads became included in the chart, and rules were altered in 2006 in order for singles to chart before physical formats were released. Since 2014, it has incorporated music streaming service data, with music video views counted towards the chart from 2018. From 10 July 2015, the chart has been based on a Friday to Thursday week.

This list shows the thirty-nine artists with the most top-ten singles on the UK singles chart. American singer-actor Elvis Presley holds the record for most top-ten singles with seventy-six entries. British musician Cliff Richard is in second place, with sixty-eight. American singer-songwriter-actress Madonna in third, with sixty-five. She gained a spot in the Guinness World Records in 1998, for the most consecutive top-ten singles with thirty-six. In fourth with forty-seven, Canadian rapper-singer Drake who also holds the record for the most top-ten singles by a rapper. In sixth with forty-one, English singer-songwriter Ed Sheeran who earned the record for the most concurrent entries in the top ten, when he occupied nine of the ten spots in 2017. British girl group Girls Aloud achieved the record for having the most top-ten entries for a girl group, with twenty-one. Australian singer Kylie Minogue is the only artist to achieve a top ten single in five consecutive decades, having had top ten hits in the 1980s, 1990s, 2000s, 2010s and 2020s.

== Tally ==
Artists with the most top-ten singles in the UK singles chart
| Number of entries | Artist | Year first entered chart | First entry (peak position) | Year most recently entered chart | Most recent entry (peak position) | Ref. |
|---|---|---|---|---|---|---|
| 76 | Elvis Presley | 1956 | "Heartbreak Hotel" (2) | 2005 | "Way Down" (2) | |
| 68 | Cliff Richard | 1958 | "Move It" (2) | 2008 | "Thank You for a Lifetime" (3) | |
| 65 | Madonna | 1984 | "Holiday" (6) | 2026 | "Love Sensation" (8) | |
| 50 | Drake | 2010 | "What's My Name?" (1) | 2026 | "Janice STFU" (2) | |
| 45 | Michael Jackson | 1972 | "Got to Be There" (5) | 2026 | "Human Nature" (6) | |
| 43 | Ed Sheeran | 2011 | "The A Team" (3) | 2025 | "Sapphire" (5) | |
| 37 | Kylie Minogue | 1988 | "I Should Be So Lucky" (1) | 2026 | "Love Sensation" (8) | |
| 37 | Taylor Swift | 2009 | "Love Story" (2) | 2026 | "Patient Zero" (1) | |
| 36 | Elton John | 1971 | "Your Song" (7) | 2022 | "Hold Me Closer" (3) | |
| 34 | Eminem | 1999 | "My Name Is" (2) | 2024 | "Houdini" (1) | |
| 33 | U2 | 1983 | "New Year's Day" (10) | 2007 | "Window in the Skies" (4) | |
| 31 | Calvin Harris | 2007 | "Acceptable in the 80s" (10) | 2025 | "Blessings" (3) | |
| 31 | Rihanna | 2005 | "Pon de Replay" (2) | 2022 | "Lift Me Up" (3) | |
| 31 | Robbie Williams | 1996 | "Freedom" (2) | 2013 | "Go Gentle" (10) | |
| 29 | The Beatles | 1963 | "Please Please Me" (2) | 2023 | "Now and Then" (1) | |
| 29 | Justin Bieber | 2010 | "Baby" (3) | 2025 | "Daisies" (1) | |
| 28 | David Guetta | 2006 | "Love Don't Let Me Go (Walking Away)" (3) | 2022 | "I'm Good (Blue)" (1) | |
| 26 | Queen | 1974 | "Seven Seas of Rhye" (10) | 2000 | "We Will Rock You" (1) | |
| 26 | Ariana Grande | 2014 | "Problem" (1) | 2026 | "Petal" (4) | |
| 25 | David Bowie | 1969 | "Space Oddity" (5) | 2013 | "Where Are We Now?" (6) | |
| 25 | Rod Stewart | 1971 | "Maggie May" / "Reason to Believe" (1) | 1997 | "Da Ya Think I'm Sexy?" (7) | |
| 25 | Westlife | 1999 | "Swear It Again" (1) | 2010 | "Safe" (10) | |
| 24 | Beyoncé | 2002 | "Work It Out" (7) | 2024 | "Jolene" (8) | |
| 24 | Mariah Carey | 1990 | "Vision of Love" (9) | 2008 | "Touch My Body" (5) | |
| 24 | Britney Spears | 1999 | "...Baby One More Time" (1) | 2022 | "Hold Me Closer" (3) | |
| 23 | George Michael | 1984 | "Careless Whisper" (1) | 2004 | "Flawless (Go to the City)" (8) | |
| 23 | Oasis | 1994 | "Live Forever" (10) | 2009 | "Falling Down" (10) | |
| 22 | Pet Shop Boys | 1985 | "West End Girls" (1) | 2006 | "I'm with Stupid" (8) | |
| 22 | Status Quo | 1968 | "Pictures of Matchstick Men" (7) | 1990 | "The Anniversary Waltz - Part One" (2) | |
| 22 | Kanye West | 2004 | "Through the Wire" (9) | 2024 | "Carnival" (5) | |
| 21 | Girls Aloud | 2002 | "Sound of the Underground" (1) | 2012 | "Something New" (2) | |
| 21 | Pink | 2000 | "There You Go" (6) | 2021 | "Anywhere Away from Here" (9) | |
| 21 | Diana Ross | 1967 | "Reflections" (5) | 2005 | "When You Tell Me That You Love Me" (2) | |
| 21 | Rolling Stones | 1964 | "Not Fade Away" (3) | 1981 | "Start Me Up" (7) | |
| 20 | ABBA | 1974 | "Waterloo" (1) | 2021 | "Don't Shut Me Down" (9) | |
| 20 | The Shadows | 1959 | "Travellin' Light" (1) | 1979 | "Theme from The Deer Hunter (Cavatina)" (9) | |
| 20 | Take That | 1992 | "It Only Takes a Minute" (7) | 2014 | "These Days" (1) | |
| 20 | Justin Timberlake | 2002 | "Like I Love You" (2) | 2022 | "Stay with Me" (10) | |
| 20 | Usher | 1998 | "You Make Me Wanna..." (1) | 2015 | "Don't Look Down" (9) | |
