= Billboard Year-End Top Artist =

Annual top-charting music artist in the United States

Billboard Year-End Top Artist (also known as Billboard Artist of the Year) is the annual top-charting music artist in the United States. The accolade has been published by Billboard magazine since 1981, based on a combined statistical performance on the weekly charts of the Billboard 200 and the Billboard Hot 100. Between 1963 and 1980, the top artists were separated for albums and singles. In 1963, Peter, Paul and Mary became the first annual Top Albums Artist and The Beach Boys became the first annual Top Singles Artist. In 1981, REO Speedwagon became the first annual Top Artist of the Year.

During the 1970s and the 1980s, before the advent of the Billboard Music Awards, the Year-End Top Artists were honored with trophies as part of the Billboard Number One Awards/Trendsetter Awards. The Top Artist category of the Billboard Music Awards has been created since 1993, although it did not always correspond with the Year-End Top Artist, due to the difference of cut-off period. The 2011 Year-End Top Artist was Adele, but Eminem received the Top Artist trophy at the 2011 Billboard Music Awards. Other Year-End Top Artists who have not won the trophy include Bruno Mars (2013), One Direction (2014), and Bad Bunny (2022).

Taylor Swift has been named the Year-End Top Artist four times, more than any other act. She achieved the title in three separate decades—the 2000s, the 2010s, and the 2020s. In 1990, New Kids on the Block became the first act to top the Year-End Top Artists chart twice, and in 2016, Adele became the first act to top the chart three times. Prior to the existence of the combined artists charts, the Beatles became the first act to be simultaneously listed as the Top Albums Artist and Top Singles Artist of the Year in 1964. In 1983, Michael Jackson became the first act to achieve all the Top Artist, Top Albums Artist, and Top Singles Artists titles in the same year.

== List of top artists of the year ==
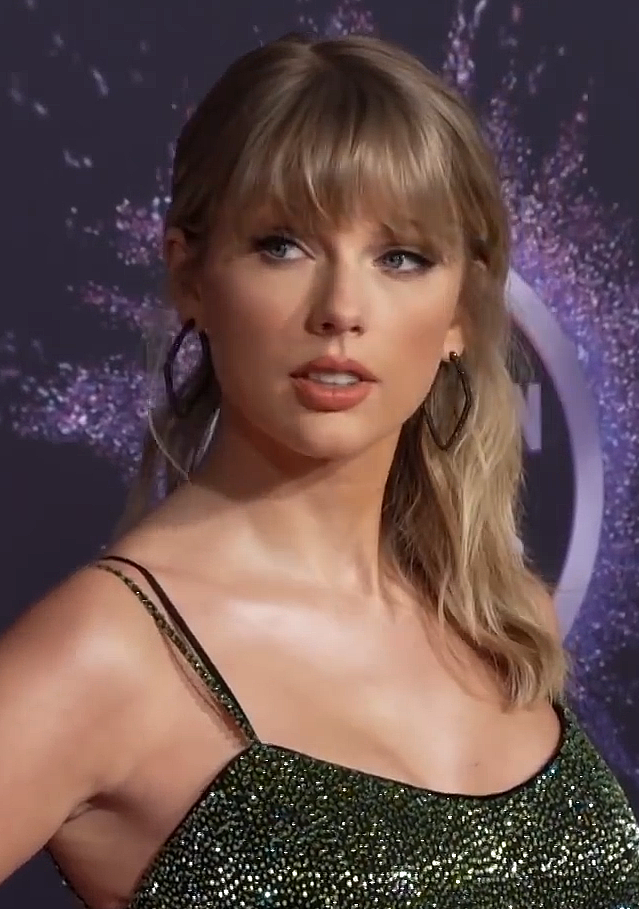
Taylor Swift is the Top Artist of 2009, 2015, 2023, and 2024.

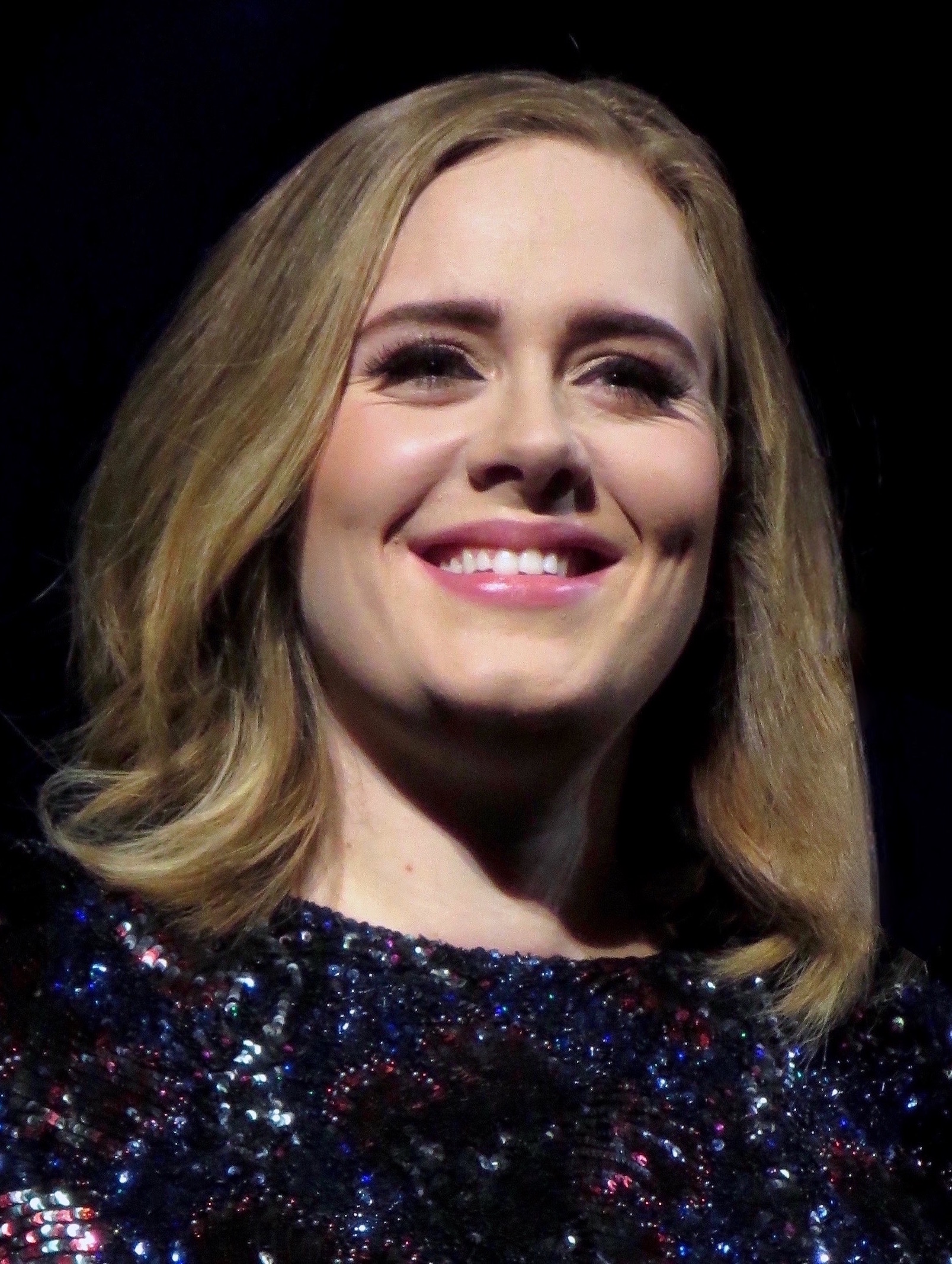
Adele is the Top Artist of 2011, 2012, and 2016.

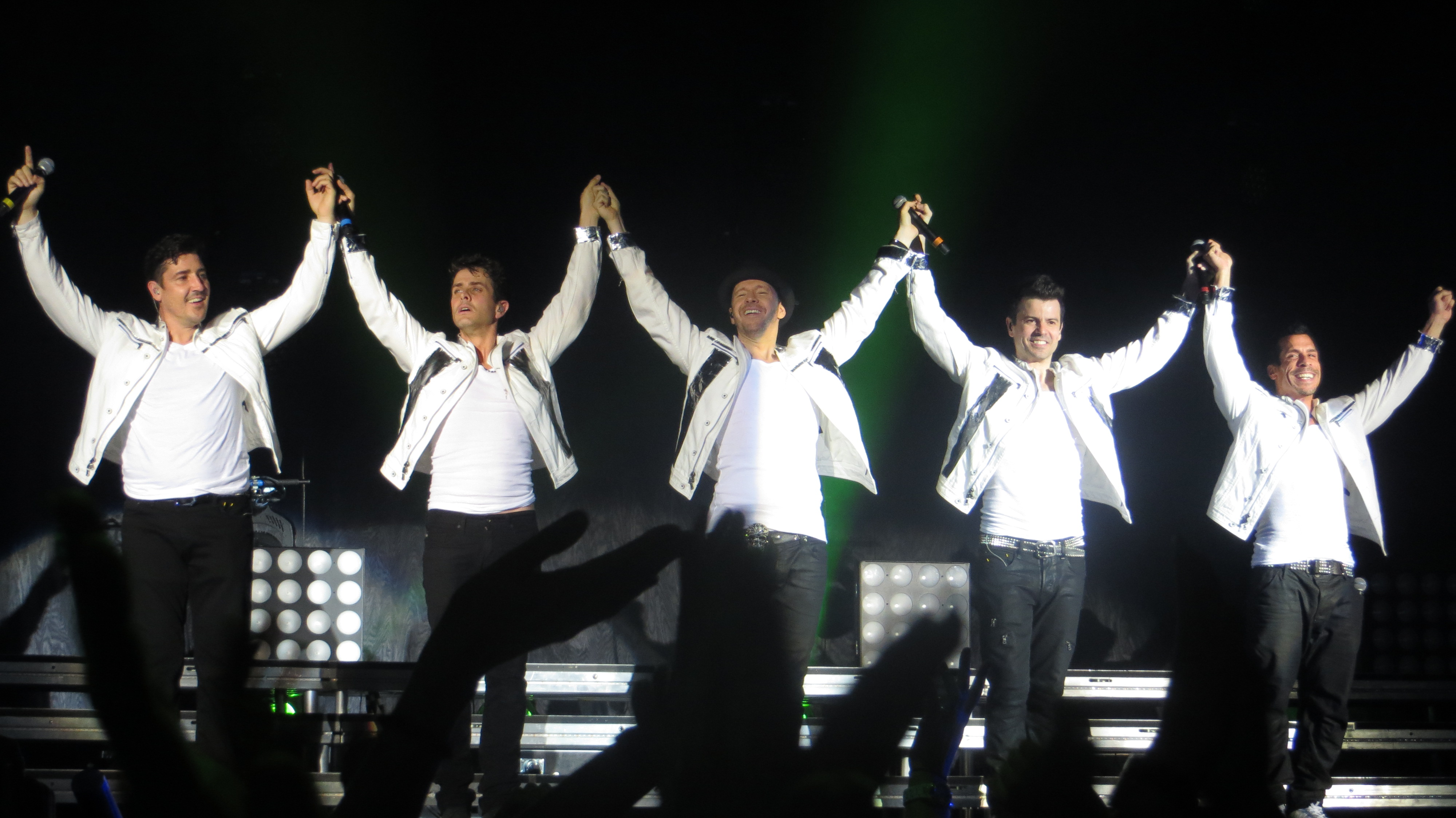
New Kids on the Block is the Top Artist of 1989 and 1990.

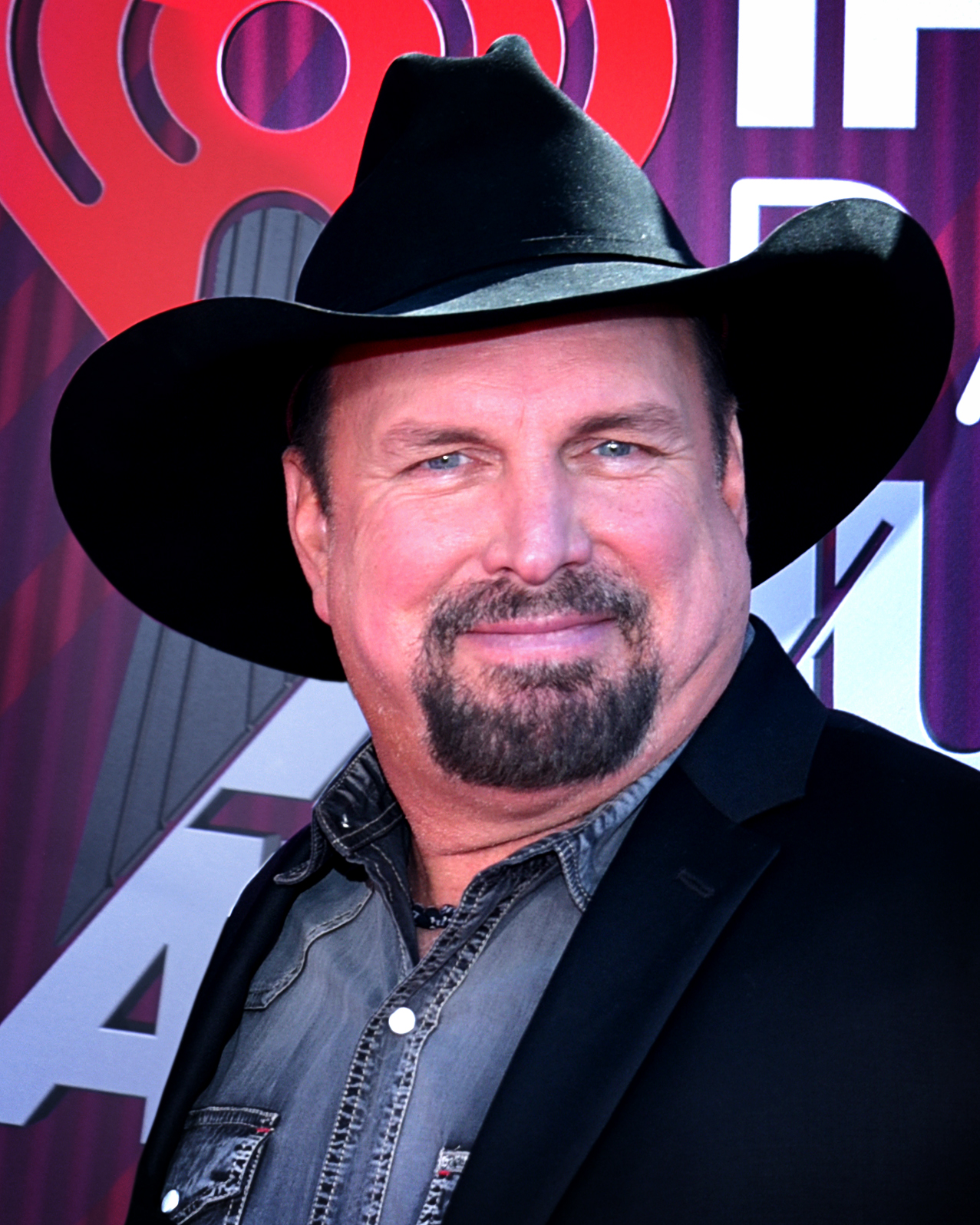
Garth Brooks is the Top Artist of 1992 and 1993.

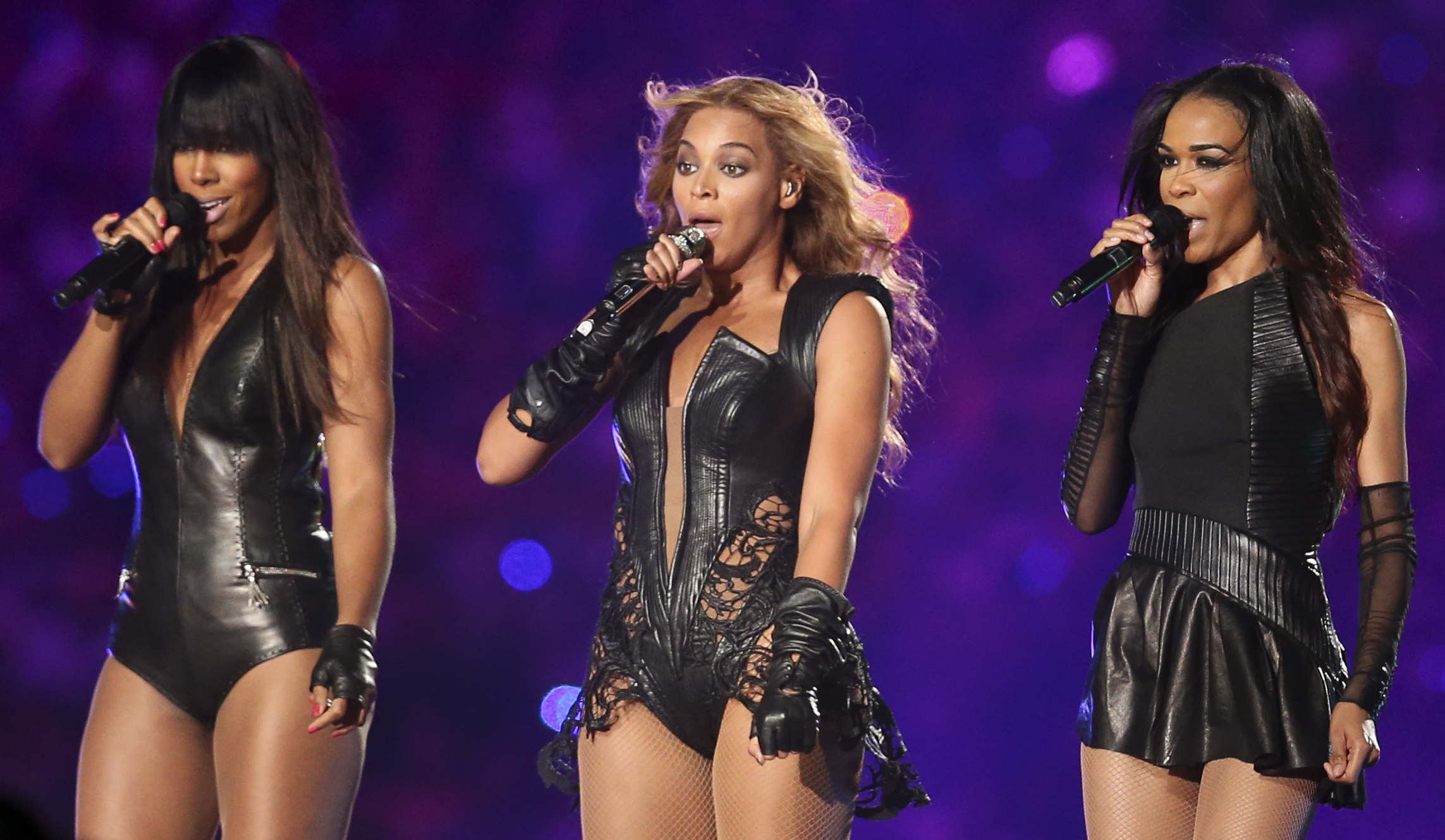
Destiny's Child is the Top Artist of 2000 and 2001.

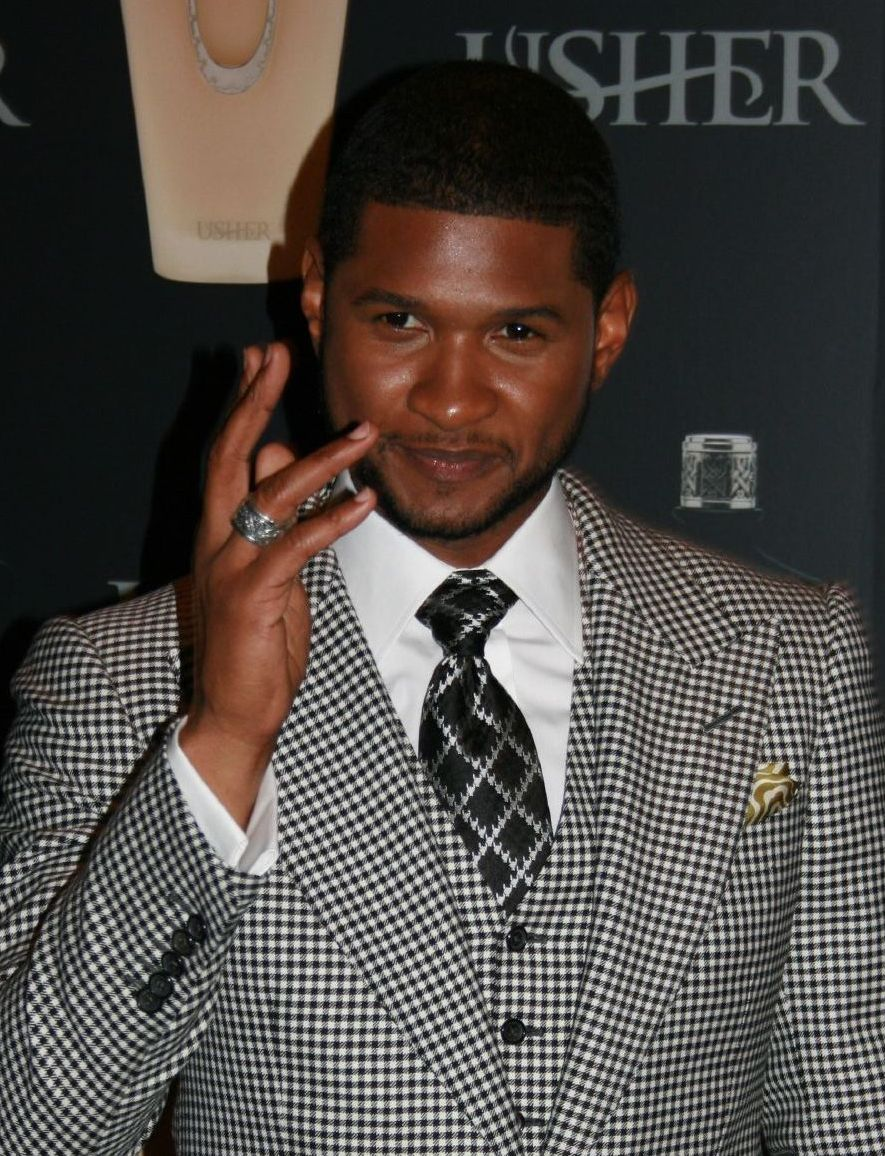
Usher is the Top Artist of 1998 and 2004.

Year	Top Artists of the Year (Combined)	Top Albums Artists	Top Singles Artists	Ref.
1963	—N/a	Peter, Paul and Mary	The Beach Boys	
1964	—N/a	The Beatles	The Beatles	
1965	—N/a	The Beatles	Herman's Hermits	
1966	—N/a	Herb Alpert	The Beatles	
1967	—N/a	Herb Alpert & the Tijuana Brass	The Monkees	
1968	—N/a	Herb Alpert & the Tijuana Brass	Aretha Franklin	
1969	—N/a	The Beatles	Creedence Clearwater Revival	
1970	—N/a	Creedence Clearwater Revival	The Jackson 5	
1971	—N/a	Chicago	Three Dog Night	
1972	—N/a	Roberta Flack	Al Green (tie); Michael Jackson (tie)	
1973	—N/a	Deep Purple	Gladys Knight & the Pips	
1974	—N/a	Jim Croce	Gladys Knight & the Pips	
1975	—N/a	Elton John	—N/a	
1976	—N/a	Aerosmith	Diana Ross	
1977	—N/a	Fleetwood Mac	Rod Stewart	
1978	—N/a	Bee Gees	Bee Gees	
1979	—N/a	Billy Joel	Donna Summer	
1980	—N/a	Pink Floyd	Michael Jackson	
1981	REO Speedwagon	REO Speedwagon	Kenny Rogers	
1982	The Go-Go's	The Go-Go's	Olivia Newton-John	
1983	Michael Jackson	Michael Jackson	Michael Jackson	
1984	Lionel Richie	Lionel Richie	Lionel Richie	
1985	Madonna	Prince and the Revolution	Madonna	
1986	Whitney Houston	Whitney Houston	Janet Jackson	
1987	Bon Jovi	Bon Jovi	Madonna	
1988	George Michael	George Michael	George Michael	
1989	New Kids on the Block	Guns N' Roses	Bobby Brown	
1990	New Kids on the Block	New Kids on the Block	Janet Jackson	
1991	Mariah Carey	Garth Brooks	Mariah Carey	
1992	Garth Brooks	Garth Brooks	Boyz II Men	
1993	Garth Brooks	Garth Brooks	Whitney Houston	
1994	Ace of Base	Ace of Base	Ace of Base	
1995	TLC	Hootie & the Blowfish	TLC	
1996	Alanis Morissette	Alanis Morissette	Mariah Carey	
1997	LeAnn Rimes	LeAnn Rimes	Elton John	
1998	Usher	Celine Dion	Usher	
1999	Backstreet Boys	Backstreet Boys	TLC	
2000	Destiny's Child	Britney Spears	Destiny's Child	
2001	Destiny's Child	The Beatles	Destiny's Child	
2002	Nelly	Eminem	Ashanti	
2003	50 Cent	50 Cent	50 Cent	
2004	Usher	Usher	Usher	
2005	50 Cent	50 Cent	50 Cent	
2006	Chris Brown	Rascal Flatts	Sean Paul	
2007	Akon	Daughtry	Akon	
2008	Chris Brown	Josh Groban	Chris Brown	
2009	Taylor Swift	Taylor Swift	Lady Gaga	
2010	Lady Gaga	Taylor Swift	Kesha	
2011	Adele	Adele	Katy Perry	
2012	Adele	Adele	Rihanna	
2013	Bruno Mars	Justin Timberlake	Bruno Mars	
2014	One Direction	Taylor Swift	Katy Perry	
2015	Taylor Swift	Taylor Swift	The Weeknd	
2016	Adele	Adele	Drake	
2017	Ed Sheeran	Drake	Ed Sheeran	
2018	Drake	Drake	Drake	
2019	Post Malone	Post Malone	Post Malone	
2020	Post Malone	Post Malone	The Weeknd	
2021	Drake	Taylor Swift	Olivia Rodrigo	
2022	Bad Bunny	Taylor Swift	Bad Bunny	
2023	Taylor Swift	Taylor Swift	Morgan Wallen	
2024	Taylor Swift	Taylor Swift	Taylor Swift	
2025	Morgan Wallen	Taylor Swift	Morgan Wallen	
