= B*Witched discography =

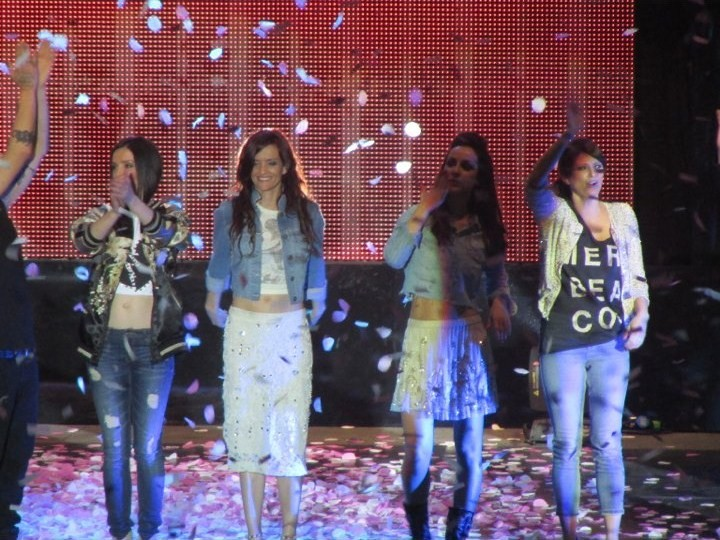
- B*Witched performing in Manchester in The Big Reunion Tour
- Studio albums: 2
- Extended plays: 3
- Compilation albums: 2
- Singles: 14
- Video albums: 2
- Music videos: 12

The discography of B*Witched consists of two studio albums, three extended plays, two compilation albums, two video albums and 14 singles (including two as part of collectives). The group released their debut single "C'est la Vie" on 25 May 1998. Despite mixed reviews, it reached Number 1 on the UK charts, making them the youngest female group ever to do so, and also made Number 9 in the US. Subsequent singles "Rollercoaster", "To You I Belong" and "Blame It on the Weatherman" also topped the UK charts. The group's debut album, B*Witched, was released in October 1998, reaching Number 3 in the UK charts and was certified Double Platinum in the UK and Platinum in the US. B*Witched's second album, Awake and Breathe, released almost exactly a year after their debut, peaked at number 5 on the charts and was certified Platinum. Singles from the album were less successful than earlier releases ("Jesse Hold On" reached number 4, "I Shall Be There" number 13 and "Jump Down" number 16 in the UK). Across America 2000, featured live tracks of C'est la Vie, Rollercoaster, Jesse Hold On, and the earlier cover of "Does Your Mother Know".

On 18 October 2012, it was announced that B*Witched would reunite for the ITV2 reality documentary series The Big Reunion. In May 2013 B*Witched unveiled a new song called "Love and Money". During a radio interview in October 2013, Edele Lynch confirmed that the group would release new material in September 2014. In December, they announced via PledgeMusic that they had recorded their second EP, entitled Champagne or Guinness.

== Albums ==
=== Studio albums ===
List of albums, with selected chart positions and certifications
Title	Album details	Peak chart positions								Certifications
Title	Album details	IRE	AUS	CAN	EUR	NZ	SCO	UK	US	Certifications
B*Witched	Released: 12 October 1998; Formats: CD, cassette; Label: Epic, Glowworm	2	5	20	8	1	4	3	12	ARIA: 2× Platinum; BPI: 2× Platinum; IFPI EUR: Platinum; MC: Platinum; RIAA: Platinum; RMNZ: 2× Platinum
Awake and Breathe	Released: 18 October 1999; Formats: CD, cassette; Label: Epic, Glowworm	16	70	—	27	27	5	5	91	BPI: Platinum; RIAA: Gold; RMNZ: Gold
"—" denotes releases that did not chart or were not released in that territory.

=== Compilations ===
Title	Album details
C'est la Vie	Released: 25 April 2006; Formats: CD, digital download; Label: Epic, Glowworm
C'est La Vie: The Collection	Released: 29 January 2016; Formats: CD, digital download; Label: Music Club Deluxe
C'est La Vie: The Collection	Released: 10 March 2023; Formats: CD, digital download; Label: Sony Music

=== Video albums ===
Title	Album details	Certifications
We Four Girls Are Here to Stay!	Released: 29 June 1999; Formats: VHS; Label: Epic	RIAA: Gold
Jump Up Jump Down Live	Released: 17 April 2000; Formats: VHS; Label: Epic	

== Extended plays ==
Title	Extended play details
Across America 2000	Released: 4 July 2000; Formats: CD, digital download; Label: Epic, Glowworm
Champagne or Guinness	Released: 26 May 2014; Formats: CD, digital download; Label: PledgeMusic
Ripped Jeans	Released: 15 August 2024; Formats: digital download; Label: Sony

== Singles ==
=== As main artist ===
List of singles, with selected chart positions and certifications
Title	Year	Peak chart positions										Certifications	Album
Title	Year	IRE	AUS	BEL	NL	NOR	NZ	SCO	SWE	UK	US	Certifications	Album
"C'est la Vie"	1998	1	6	2	11	9	1	1	11	1	9	ARIA: Platinum; BEA: Gold; BPI: Platinum; IFPI SWE: Gold; RIAA: Gold; RMNZ: Platinum	B*Witched
"Rollercoaster"	1998	2	1	55	55	20	1	1	16	1	67	ARIA: Platinum; BPI: Gold; RMNZ: Platinum	B*Witched
"To You I Belong"	1998	4	25	63	82	—	5	1	42	1	—	BPI: Gold	B*Witched
"Blame It on the Weatherman"	1999	8	48	—	—	—	29	2	—	1	—	BPI: Silver	B*Witched
"Thank ABBA for the Music" (with Steps, Tina Cousins, Cleopatra and Billie Piper)	1999	5	9	23	14	—	6	2	8	4	—	ARIA: Platinum	ABBAmania
"Jesse Hold On"	1999	6	59	64	96	—	22	3	36	4	—	BPI: Silver	Awake and Breathe
"I Shall Be There" (featuring Ladysmith Black Mambazo)	1999	29	—	—	—	—	—	11	—	13	—		Awake and Breathe
"Jump Down"	2000	26	88	—	—	—	—	18	—	16	—		Awake and Breathe
"Love and Money"	2013	—	—	—	—	—	—	—	—	—	—		Champagne or Guiness
"The Stars Are Ours"	2014	—	—	—	—	—	—	—	—	—	—		Champagne or Guiness
"Hold On"	2019	—	—	—	—	—	—	—	—	—	—		Non-album single
"Birthday"	2023	—	—	—	—	—	—	—	—	—	—		Ripped Jeans
"Firefly"	2026	—	—	—	—	—	—	—	—	—	—		TBA
"That Look"	2026	—	—	—	—	—	—	—	—	—	—		TBA
"—" denotes releases that did not chart or were not released in that territory.

=== As featured artist ===
List of singles, with selected chart positions and certifications
Title	Year	Peak chart positions			Album
Title	Year	IRE	SCO	UK	Album
"I Wish It Could Be Christmas Every Day" (among The Big Reunion cast)	2013	82	32	21	Non-album single

== Other appearances ==
Title	Year	Album
"Does Your Mother Know"	1999	ABBAmania
"Get Happy"	1999	Pokémon: The First Movie
"Mickey"	2000	Bring It On: Music from the Motion Picture
"Hold On"	2001	The Princess Diaries: Original Soundtrack

== Music videos ==
Title	Year	Director
"C'est la Vie"	1998	Alison Murray
"Rollercoaster"	1998	Alison Murray
"To You I Belong"	1998	Katie Bell
"Rollercoaster" (US version)	1999	Alison Murray
"Blame It on the Weatherman"	1999	Michael Geoghegan
"Thank ABBA for the Music"	1999	—N/a
"Jesse Hold On"	1999	Andy Morahan
"I Shall Be There"	1999	Katie Bell
"Jump Down"	2000	—N/a
"Love and Money"	2013	
"The Stars Are Ours"	2015	B*Witched
"Birthday"	2023	Leon Mitchell
