= Some Kind of Miracle (song) =

Song by Girls Aloud

from the album Sound of the Underground
- Released: 23 May 2003
- Genre: Pop
- Length: 3:09
- Label: Polydor
- Songwriters: Miranda Cooper; Brian Higgins; Lisa Cowling; Tim Powell; Shawn Lee; Edele Lynch
- Producers: Brian Higgins; Xenomania; Jeremy Wheatley

"Some Kind of Miracle" is a song by British all-female pop group Girls Aloud, appearing on their debut studio album Sound of the Underground (2003). The song was written by Miranda Cooper, Brian Higgins and his production team Xenomania, and produced by Higgins and Xenomania. One of six songs produced by Xenomania for Sound of the Underground, "Some Kind of Miracle" was also remixed by Illicit.

Receiving comparisons to Madonna, the Bangles and Geri Halliwell, "Some Kind of Miracle" was praised by contemporary music critics as a stand-out track from Sound of the Underground. "Some Kind of Miracle" was intended to be the album's fourth single, but these plans were canceled upon the recording of "Jump" for the Love Actually soundtrack.

== Background and composition ==
Following the success of their debut single "Sound of the Underground", Girls Aloud began work on their debut album. Initially, Brian Higgins and Xenomania had only produced "Sound of the Underground" and second single "No Good Advice". Higgins said, "They'd sent them off to these other Swedish guys and different people in the UK [...] I said, 'There are two completely separate groups on this record. We need to get rid of six tracks and I'll replace them'. We did that and allowed the album to stand up as a body of work." "Some Kind of Miracle" was one of six songs that Higgins and Xenomania ended up producing for Sound of the Underground.

"Some Kind of Miracle" was written by Higgins, Miranda Cooper, Lisa Cowling, Tim Powell, Shawn Lee, and former B*Witched member Edele Lynch. The song, originally titled "Should I Stay or Should I Go", has "layered vocals with its slow tempo despite being more formulaic" than other Xenomania productions. Described as "a breezy summer pop song about trying to bag a guy," the song was said to sound like "a 21st century Bangles", as well as former Spice Girls member Geri Halliwell.

== Release ==
"Some Kind of Miracle" was originally intended to be the third single from Sound of the Underground until Polydor Records noticed the warm reception fans gave "Life Got Cold". It was then decided that "Some Kind of Miracle" would be the album's fourth single. However, the opportunity arose for Girls Aloud to release a single for the Love Actually soundtrack when director Richard Curtis requested they record a cover of the Pointer Sisters' "Jump". The re-recorded version of "Some Kind of Miracle" that would have been released as a single appeared on the re-release of Sound of the Underground later that year. Remixes of "Some Kind of Miracle" had also already been commissioned. Illicit remixed the song, which later appeared on the rarities disc of Girls Aloud's Singles Box Set in 2009.

== Reception ==
Contemporary music critics praised "Some Kind of Miracle" as an album highlight. In a review of Sound of the Underground, BBC's Ian Youngs stated that "there are more gems to be found," describing "Some Kind of Miracle" as "lovely." Jacqueline Hodges, also writing for BBC, praised "Some Kind of Miracle" as "superficial pop at its purest. With a vocal hook that gnaws its way into your brain and leaves you afflicted with a tendency to repeat it again and again in your head, it must qualify for future chart success." It was also labeled a stand-out by Anne-Louise Foley of RTÉ.ie, who said it was one of the tracks "that give[s] your ears and hips a big tug," and pinpointed it as a possible future single. Other critics predicting it would be a future single included Colin Somerville of Scotland on Sunday. Martyn Leek of the Sunday Mercury described the song's sound as having "a syrupy 60s feel", and Lisa Verrico of The Times wrote that it was "a breezy summer pop song about trying to bag a guy", while Paul Connolly of The Times suggested a similarity to "Beautiful Stranger" by Madonna. Gemma Pike of Runcorn and Widnes Weekly News noted, "The tempo is slowed a little for Some Kind of Miracle, which has a Geri Halliwell pop song feel to it, but is classier and better produced."

== Personnel ==
- Written by Miranda Cooper, Brian Higgins, Lisa Cowling, Tim Powell, Shawn Lee, and Edele Lynch
- Produced by Brian Higgins, Xenomania and Jeremy Wheatley
- Keyboards and programming by Brian Higgins, Tim Powell, Nick Coler, Matt Gray and Tim "Rolf" Larcombe
- Guitar by Shawn Lee
- Mixed by Jeremy Wheatley at Townhouse Studios
- Published by Warner Chappell / Xenomania Music / Copyright Control
