= List of awards and nominations received by Girls Aloud =

Girls Aloud are an English-Irish girl group that were created on the ITV1 talent show Popstars: The Rivals in 2002. The group, consisting of Cheryl, Nadine Coyle, Sarah Harding, Nicola Roberts and Kimberley Walsh, have been successful in achieving a string of twenty consecutive top ten singles (including four number ones) and two number one albums in the UK. All their albums are certified platinum. Girls Aloud have become one of the few UK reality television acts to achieve continued success, amassing a fortune of £30 million by 2010.

Girls Aloud have been nominated for five BRIT Awards, winning Best Single for 2008's "The Promise" at the 2009 awards ceremony. They have also been awarded by members of the British media such as The Sun's Bizarre, Capital FM, Glamour, Heat, Popjustice, and Virgin Media.

== BRIT Awards ==
The BRIT Awards are the British Phonographic Industry's annual pop music awards. Girls Aloud have been nominated five times, winning their first award in 2009.

Year	Nominee / work	Award	Result
2005	Girls Aloud	Best Pop Act	Nominated
2008	Girls Aloud	Best British Group	Nominated
2009	Girls Aloud	Best British Group	Nominated
2009	"The Promise"	Best British Single	Won
2010	"The Promise (Live at the 2009 Brit Awards)"	Best Live Performance at the Brit Awards	Nominated

== BT Digital Music Awards ==
The BT Digital Music Awards, administered by BT Group, recognize artists "who are delivering the best in cutting-edge digital music entertainment." Girls Aloud won their sole nomination in 2004.

Year	Nominee / work	Award	Result
2004	Girls Aloud	Best Pop Artist	Won

== Capital FM Awards ==
The Capital FM Awards are an annual awards ceremony administered by popular London radio station 95.8 Capital FM. Girls Aloud have been nominated six times, winning twice.

Year	Nominee / work	Award	Result
2004	Girls Aloud	Favourite UK Group	Nominated
2005	Girls Aloud	Favourite UK Group	Nominated
2005	What Will the Neighbours Say?	Favourite UK Album	Nominated
2005	Girls Aloud	Favourite Pop Act	Won
2008	Girls Aloud	London's Favourite UK Group	Nominated
2008	Girls Aloud	News of the World Fabulous Award	Won

== Disney Channel Kids Awards ==
The Disney Channel Kids Awards was an annual awards ceremony held by Disney Channel in the United Kingdom and Ireland. Girls Aloud were nominated for three awards during the ceremony's run, winning one.

Year	Nominee / work	Award	Result
2003	Girls Aloud	Best Newcomer	Nominated
2003	"Sound of the Underground"	Best Single	Won
2004	"The Show"	Best Single	Nominated

== Festival Awards ==
Year	Nominee / work	Award	Result
2006	V Festival	Favourite Pop Act at a Festival	Won
2008	Girls Aloud	Best Pop Act	Nominated

== Glamour Woman of the Year Awards ==
The Glamour Woman of the Year Awards are given annually by Glamour magazine. Girls Aloud have been nominated for Band of the Year four times, winning three of the four times.

Year	Nominee / work	Award	Result
2004	Girls Aloud	Band of the Year	Nominated
2005	Girls Aloud	Band of the Year	Won
2007	Girls Aloud	Band of the Year	Won
2009	Girls Aloud	Band of the Year	Won

== Heat Awards ==
The Heat Awards are organised by Heat magazine. Girls Aloud have won four out of their five nominations.

Year	Nominee / work	Award	Result
2008	Out of Control	Best Album	Won
2008	Girls Aloud	Best Band	Won
2008	"The Promise"	Best Single	Nominated

== Music Producers Guild Awards ==
The Music Producers Guild Awards was created "to celebrate the creative talent and technical ability of the UK's music producers, engineers, mixers and re-mixers." Girls Aloud have won their sole nomination.

Year	Nominee / work	Award	Result
2009	Tangled Up	Best Live Album of the Year	Won

== National Music Awards ==
Year	Nominee / work	Award	Result
2003	Girls Aloud	Best Newcomer	Nominated

== Nickelodeon UK Kids' Choice Awards ==
The Nickelodeon UK Kids' Choice Awards is an annual awards show presented by Nickelodeon, based on the American and Australian formats. Girls Aloud have been three times, but have yet to win.

Year	Nominee / work	Award	Result
2007	Girls Aloud	Best Band	Nominated
2008	Girls Aloud	Best Band	Nominated

== O2 Silver Clef Awards ==
Girls Aloud were awarded the Heart Record of the Year Award for their single "See the Day" at the O2 Silver Clef Lunch, an annual awards ceremony honouring songwriting and performance in aid of Nordoff-Robbins Music Therapy. Nicola Roberts and Kimberley Walsh, members of the band, attended the awards presentation ceremony.

Year	Nominee / work	Award	Result
2005	"See the Day"	Heart Record of the Year Award	Won

== Popjustice £20 Music Prize ==
The Popjustice £20 Music Prize is an annual prize awarded by a panel of judges organised by music website Popjustice to the singer(s) of the best British pop single of the past year. To qualify, a single must be by a British artist(s) and have been released within the 12 months prior to the award nominations in July. Girls Aloud have been nominated a record eight years, winning five of them.

Year	Nominee / work	Award	Result
2003	"No Good Advice"	Best British Pop Single	Won
2004	"The Show"	Best British Pop Single	Nominated
2005	"Wake Me Up"	Best British Pop Single	Won
2006	"Biology"	Best British Pop Single	Won
2007	"Something Kinda Ooooh"	Best British Pop Single	Nominated
2008	"Call the Shots"	Best British Pop Single	Won
2009	"The Promise"	Best British Pop Single	Won
2013	"Something New"	Best British Pop Single	Nominated

== Popjustice Readers Poll ==
Year	Nominee / work	Award	Result
2008	"The Promise"	Best Single	Nominated
2008	Out of Control	Best Album	Won
2008	"Apologize"	Worst Cover	Nominated
2008	"The Promise"	Best Number 1 Single	Won
2008	Girls Aloud, Pet Shop Boys and Xenomania	Best Collaboration	Nominated
2008	"The Promise"	Best Dance Routine	Nominated
2008	Girls Aloud - "The Promise"	Worst X Factor Performance	Nominated
2008	"The Promise"	Most Overrated Song	Nominated
2008	Girls Aloud	Best Pop Act of 2008	Won
2009	"Untouchable"	Best Single	Nominated
2009	"Untouchable"	Best Video	Nominated
2009	"Untouchable"	Artwork Fail	Nominated
2010	Girls Aloud	Established Act Most Likely to Save Pop (Not That It Needs Saving) in 2011	Nominated
2011	Girls Aloud	Established Act Most Likely to Save Pop (Not That It Needs Saving) in 2011	Nominated
2012	"Something New"	Best Single	Nominated
2012	"Beautiful 'Cause You Love Me"	Worst Single	Nominated
2012	"Beautiful 'Cause You Love Me"	Least Inspiring So-Called 'Motivational' Pop Song	Nominated
2012	Girls Aloud	Best Comeback	Won
2012	Girls Aloud and Xenomania	Best Collaboration	Nominated
2012	"Something New"	Best Video	Nominated
2012	"Something New"	Worst Video	Nominated
2012	Girls Aloud	Act We Should Send to Eurovision in 2013	Nominated
2012	Girls Aloud	Group Most Likely Splitting in 2013	Won
2013	Girls Aloud	Live Act Who Comes Closest to Justifying Absurd Ticket Prices	Nominated

== The Record of the Year ==
The Record of the Year is an award voted by the British public. The award began in 1998, and was televised on ITV before being dropped in 2006 after disagreements over the phone voting element. Since then it has been an online poll, administered through the Record of the Year website. Girls Aloud have been nominated once.

Year	Nominee / work	Award	Result
2004	"Love Machine"	The Record of the Year	Nominated

== Smash Hits Poll Winners Party ==
The Smash Hits Poll Winners Party was an awards ceremony which ran from 1988 to 2005. Each award winner was voted by readers of the Smash Hits magazine. It ended with the closure of the magazine in February 2006. Girls Aloud were only nominated once, winning their nomination.

Year	Nominee / work	Award	Result
2003	Girls Aloud	Hot New Talent	Won

== TMF Awards ==
The TMF Awards are an annual television awards show broadcast live on TMF (The Music Factory).

Year	Nominee / work	Award	Result
2005	Girls Aloud	Best UK Act	Won

== UK Video Music Awards ==
Year	Nominee / work	Award	Result
2008	"Sexy! No No No..."	Best Video	Nominated

== Virgin Media Music Awards ==
The Virgin Media Music Awards are an annual awards ceremony, run by Virgin Media and announce on its official website. Girls Aloud and its members have won five awards.

Year	Nominee / work	Award	Result
2007	Tangled Up	Album of the Year	Won
2007	Girls Aloud	Best UK Act	Nominated
2007	"Sexy! No No No..."	Video of the Year	Won
2008	Out of Control	Best Album	Nominated
2008	Out of Control	Best Album Cover	Won
2008	Girls Aloud	Best UK Act	Nominated
2008	Girls Aloud	Legend of the Year	Nominated
2009	Girls Aloud	Best Group	Nominated

== Vodafone Live Music Awards ==
Year	Nominee / work	Award	Result
2008	Tangled Up Tour	Tour of the Year	Nominated

== Zoo Magazine Awards ==
The Zoo Magazine Awards are given by men's magazine Zoo Weekly. Girls Aloud have won one of its two nominations.

Year	Nominee / work	Award	Result
2007	Girls Aloud	Best Female Band	Won

== See also ==
- Girls Aloud discography
- Girls Aloud videography
- List of Girls Aloud concert tours
- List of Girls Aloud songs
