= Champagne or Guinness =

EP by B*Witched
- Released: 28 September 2014
- Recorded: 2013–2014
- Genres: Pop; dance-pop; electropop
- Length: 16:43
- Label: PledgeMusic
- Producers: Nigel Butler; Ray Hedges; Jenna Donnelly; Lee Franklin; Jamie Sellers; Ben Cartwright; Jay Marsh; Raven Bush; Mike Peters

B*Witched chronology
Across America 2000 (2000)	Champagne or Guinness (2014)	Ripped Jeans (2024)

Singles from Champagne or Guinness
- 1. "Love and Money" Released: 7 July 2013; 2. "The Stars Are Ours" Released: 21 September 2014

Champagne or Guinness is an extended play released by the Irish girl group B*Witched in 2014. After reuniting as part of the TV series The Big Reunion in 2012 and the success of the associated tour, B*Witched began recording new music. Champagne or Guinness was their first EP in over a decade, following "Across America 2000" in 2000.

== Background and composition ==
B*Witched released their second album, Awake and Breathe, in 1999. Though it was certified Platinum in the UK, it was less successful than their first album, B*Witched. Just before they were to begin recording their third album in 2002, they were told that their record label, Sony, had dropped them. A discussion took place amongst the members of the group in relation to finding another record label, however, the group officially split later that year when Sinéad O'Carroll decided to leave the band.

Ten years later, on 18 October 2012, it was announced that B*Witched would reunite for an ITV2 series entitled The Big Reunion. Due to the success of The Big Reunion, the band embarked on an arena tour around the UK and Ireland in May 2013: The Big Reunion concerts. Lindsay Armaou said that they may record new material. In December 2013 B*Witched announced the EP on PledgeMusic.

In July 2014, Armaou said of the upcoming EP "It’s the current, up-to-date version of B*Witched. We’ve kept the pop element, the Irish element, there’s a ballad on there as well that is quite emotional. We’ve really poured our hearts and souls into this EP and it reflects who we are and where we are today." They released the single "Love & Money" on 7 July 2013 and "The Stars Are Ours" on 21 September 2014. The EP was released on 28 September. It was funded by fans and released directly by B*Witched; the group members wrote and produced every track on the EP.

In September 2014 Keavy Lynch said of the EP "We took out time to write the EP and try different styles to find the right avenue for B*Witched as we are now. It’s still pop music and still influenced by our Irish roots but it has matured as we have", adding her ambition for the album was "to give something current to our fans who have fantastically supported our journey since The Big Reunion as a way of saying thank you. And it felt like the right thing to so for us as a band too.

== Reception ==
Marc Snetiker from Entertainment Weekly gave a favourable review, calling the EP "glorious", adding "It’s certainly rocking more of a modern vibe than the group’s old stuff, as if all four members turned into little Kelly Clarksons in the interim." Commenting on the track "Champagne or Guinness" Arielle Dachille from Bustle said "I must admit, it's no 'Rollercoaster,' but it will make you smile." Nathan Jolly from MAX said the EP was "exactly as it should be. The title track in particular sounds like vintage B*Witched – which is to say you can link arms and skip in a circle to it."

Brendon Veevers form Renowned for Sound gave the EP five out of five stars, concluding that it was "a fantastic comeback collection from the Irish sweethearts that will definitely thrill fans who have remained patient for the long overdue return of the group and their modernised style will appeal to a brand new audience as the quartet prepares to take over the pop world once again. Champagne or Guinness is definitely one of the finest releases to come out of pop music in 2014." Emilie Devillet from Music-news.com gave the EP three of five stars, saying it was "definitely more mature and shows that the girls have evolved and can meet today’s pop music’s standards. It is still fun, light, catchy but in a grown-up way. If you were a fan of theirs 15 years ago, you should feel like they have never left your side. If you are a newbie, just get up and start Irish dancing!"

== Live performances ==
On 13 July 2014 they co-headlined with Shayne Ward at the South Tyneside Summer Festival in South Shields, and performed songs from the EP. To celebrate the release of the various artists album "G-A-Y Divas", B*Witched performed songs from "Champagne or Guinness" as well as their older hits at the nightclub G-A-Y on 4 October 2014.

== Track listing ==
All tracks are written by Lindsay Armaou, Edele Lynch, Keavy Lynch and Sinéad O'Carroll; additional songwriters and producers are noted below.

No.	Title	Writer(s)	Producer(s)	Length
1.	"Love and Money"	Nigel Butler; Ray Hedges	Butler; Hedges	3:00
2.	"Fighting for the Drop"	Jenna Donnelly	Donnelly; Lee Franklin^{[a]}	3:16
3.	"Champagne or Guinness"	Jamie Sellers	Sellers; Donnelly^{[b]}	3:43
4.	"We've Forgotten How"	Ben Cartwright; Jay Marsh	Cartwright; Marsh; Donnelly^{[b]}	2:56
5.	"Waiting All This Time"	Donnelly; Warren Meyers	Donnelly; Meyers; Raven Bush^{[a]}	2:52
6.	"The Stars Are Ours"	Meyers; Mike Peters	Peters	3:53
Total length:				19:40

Notes

- ^a signifies additional production
- ^b signifies vocal production
