= The Stars Are Ours =

The Stars Are Ours may refer to:

- The Stars Are Ours!, a 1954 science fiction novel by Andre Norton
- The Stars are Ours , a 1953 science fiction novel by Kenneth Bulmer
- "The Stars are Ours", song by Mayer Hawthorne from Where Does This Door Go
- "The Stars are Ours", song by B*Witched from Champagne or Guinness
