= Jesse Hold On =

1999 single by B*Witched

Single by B*Witched

from the album Awake and Breathe
- B-side: "Coming Around Again"
- Released: 4 October 1999
- Genre: Pop
- Length: 3:20
- Label: Epic; Glowworm
- Songwriters: Edele Lynch; Keavy Lynch; Sinéad O'Carroll; Lindsay Armaou; Ray Hedges; Martin Brannigan; Robert Hodgens
- Producer: Ray "Madman" Hedges

B*Witched singles chronology
| "Blame It on the Weatherman" (1999) | "Jesse Hold On" (1999) | "I Shall Be There" (1999) |

"Jesse Hold On" is a song by Irish girl group B*Witched. It was released on 4 October 1999 as the lead single from their second studio album Awake and Breathe (1999). The single reached number six on the Irish Singles Chart and number four on the UK Singles Chart, receiving a silver certification from the British Phonographic Industry (BPI) for shipments of over 200,000. The single's B-side is a cover of the 1986 Carly Simon song "Coming Around Again".

== Music video ==
The western-themed music video was filmed at the Pacific Southwest Railway Museum in Campo, San Diego County, California, and was directed by Andy Morahan.

== Track listings ==
UK CD1

1. "Jesse Hold On" – 3:20
2. "Coming Around Again" – 3:36
3. "Jesse Hold On" (karaoke version) – 3:15
4. "Jesse Hold On" (video)

UK CD2

1. "Jesse Hold On" – 3:20
2. "Jesse Hold On" (The Bold & The Beautiful Glamourmix) – 6:46
3. "Jesse Hold On" (The HB Source Upfront mix) – 6:13

UK cassette single

1. "Jesse Hold On" – 3:20
2. "Jesse Hold On" (The HB Source 7-inch Upfront mix) – 3:20

European CD single

1. "Jesse Hold On" – 3:20
2. "Coming Around Again" – 3:36

Australia CD single

1. "Jesse Hold On" – 3:20
2. "Coming Around Again" – 3:36
3. "Jesse Hold On" (karaoke version) – 3:15
4. "Jesse Hold On" (The Bold & The Beautiful Glamourmix) – 6:46
5. "Jesse Hold On" (The HB Source Upfront mix) – 6:13

Japanese CD single

1. "Jesse Hold On" – 3:21
2. "Coming Around Again" – 3:36
3. "Jesse Hold On" (The Bold & The Beautiful Glamourmix) – 6:43
4. "Jesse Hold On" (The HB Source Upfront mix) – 6:14

== Credits and personnel ==
Credits are lifted from the Awake and Breathe album booklet.

Studio

- Produced in Ray "Madman" Hedges' Mothership

Personnel

- Edele Lynch – writing
- Keavy Lynch – writing
- Sinéad O'Carroll – writing
- Lindsay Armaou – writing
- Ray Hedges – writing, production, arrangement
- Martin Brannigan – writing, arrangement
- Robert Hodgens – writing, guitar
- Erwin Keiles – guitar
- Cutfather & Joe – additional production and remix

== Charts ==
=== Weekly charts ===
| Chart (1999) | Peak position |
|---|---|
| Australia (ARIA) | 59 |
| Belgium (Ultratip Bubbling Under Flanders) | 14 |
| Estonia (Eesti Top 20) | 14 |
| Europe (Eurochart Hot 100) | 17 |
| Finland (Suomen virallinen lista) | 6 |
| Ireland (IRMA) | 6 |
| Netherlands (Single Top 100) | 96 |
| New Zealand (Recorded Music NZ) | 22 |
| Scotland Singles (Official Charts) | 3 |
| Sweden (Sverigetopplistan) | 36 |
| UK Singles (Official Charts) | 4 |
| UK Airplay (Music Week) | 42 |

=== Year-end charts ===
| Chart (1999) | Position |
|---|---|
| UK Singles (OCC) | 82 |

== Certifications ==
| Region | Certification | Certified units/sales |
|---|---|---|
| United Kingdom (BPI) | Silver | 200,000^{^} |
^{^} Shipments figures based on certification alone.

== Release history ==
| Region | Date | Format(s) | Label(s) | Ref. |
|---|---|---|---|---|
| United Kingdom | 4 October 1999 | CD; cassette | Epic; Glowworm | |
| Japan | 27 October 1999 | CD | Epic | |
