= Some Kind of Miracle =

Some Kind of Miracle may refer to:

- "Some Kind of Miracle" (Grey's Anatomy), a 2007 episode of Grey's Anatomy
- "Some Kind of Miracle" (song), a song from Girls Aloud's debut album Sound of the Underground (2003)
- "Some Kind of Miracle", a song from Kelly Clarkson's debut album Thankful (2003)
