= Tara Lynch =

Tara Lynch may refer to:

- Tara Lynch, a member of the Irish girl group Fab!
- Tara Lynch, a member of the Australian funk and soul band The Transatlantics
