= I Shall Be There =

Single by B*Witched featuring Ladysmith Black Mambazo

from the album Awake and Breathe
- B-side: "Don't Say Never"; "Does Your Mother Know"
- Released: 6 December 1999
- Recorded: 1999
- Genre: Pop
- Length: 4:12
- Label: Epic; Glowworm
- Songwriters: Lindsay Armaou; Martin Brannigan; Ray Hedges; Edele Lynch; Keavy Lynch; Sinéad O'Carroll
- Producer: Ray "Madman" Hedges

B*Witched singles chronology
"Jesse Hold On" (1999)	"I Shall Be There" (1999)	"Jump Down" (2000)

"I Shall Be There" is a song by Irish girl group B*Witched, featuring vocals from South African male choral group Ladysmith Black Mambazo. It was released on 6 December 1999 as the second single from their second studio album, Awake and Breathe (1999).

== Overview ==
The recording of the song was a collaboration with African choir Ladysmith Black Mambazo. B*Witched member Edele Lynch along with MSNBC explained the pairing:

"We met them backstage at the Brit Awards in 1999, and me and Keavy had been listening to a lot of their stuff, so we asked if they wanted to work with us, and when we came together in the studio it just all kind of fell into place and made for a really interesting experience."

== Music video ==
The music video was directed by Katie Bell. It has a very wild 'African' feel to it and featured two different scenes, a jungle scene with the group wearing appropriate clothing, and a savanna theme which was darker and had the girls dressed in more conservative and earth-coloured outfits. Both scenes feature CGI animals.

== Chart performance ==
"I Shall Be There" was released on 6 December 1999 and entered the UK Singles Chart at number 13, becoming B*Witched's first single to miss the UK top 10. It spent a total of nine weeks on the chart, five of which were in the top 40. The single was not released in Australia or New Zealand.

== Charts ==
Chart (1999)	Peak position
Europe (Eurochart Hot 100)	57
Ireland (IRMA)	29
Scotland Singles (OCC)	11
UK Singles (OCC)	13
UK Airplay (Music Week)	31
