= Awake and Breathe =

Studio album by B*Witched
- Released: 18 October 1999
- Recorded: 1998–1999
- Genres: Pop; dance-pop; teen pop
- Length: 40:01
- Labels: Epic; Glow Worm
- Producers: Ray Hedges; Cutfather & Joe

B*Witched chronology
B*Witched (1998)	Awake and Breathe (1999)	Across America 2000 (2000)

Singles from Awake and Breathe
- 1. "Jesse Hold On" Released: 11 October 1999; 2. "I Shall Be There" Released: 6 December 1999; 3. "Jump Down" Released: 27 March 2000

Professional ratings
Review scores
Source	Rating
AllMusic	3/5 stars
Entertainment Weekly	B−
NME	0/10

Awake and Breathe is the second studio album by Irish girl group B*Witched, released on 18 October 1999. The album was recorded on the back of the success of their self-titled debut B*Witched, and marked a slight change in sound for the band, containing more dance-orientated and upbeat pop, rather than the teen pop direction of their first album. The single "Jesse Hold On" and "If It Don't Fit" also mark a change into the country side of pop, described by the band during ITV2's The Big Reunion as "sweet and shiny". Three singles were released from the album: "Jesse Hold On", "I Shall Be There" and "Jump Down". However, poor sales of the album and the third single, "Jump Down", resulted in the band being dropped by their record label, and Awake and Breathe becoming their final album, until they got back together in 2012.

== Commercial performance ==
Awake and Breathe peaked at number five on the UK Albums Chart on the week of release, and was certified Platinum the same year. In other territories, the album was significantly less successful than B*Witched. In Australia, the album reached a lowly number 70, and reached number 27 in New Zealand, while B*Witched peaked within the top 10 in both of these countries. The album peaked at just number 91 on the US Billboard 200 albums chart, but sold enough to be certified Gold in January 2000. The three singles performed reasonably, with the lead single "Jesse Hold On" peaking at number four and being certified Silver, and the second and third singles, "I Shall Be There" and "Jump Down" respectively both peaking within the top 20. However, these performances was a far cry from B*Witched's singles, all of which topped the UK Singles Chart.

== Track listing ==
All tracks are written by Lindsay Armaou, Martin Brannigan, Ray Hedges, Edele Lynch, Keavy Lynch and Sinéad O'Carroll and produced by Hedges, except where noted.

No.	Title	Writer(s)	Producer(s)	Length
1.	"If It Don't Fit"			3:37
2.	"Jesse Hold On"	Lindsay Armaou; Martin Brannigan; Ray Hedges; Robert Hodgens; Edele Lynch; Keavy Lynch; Sinéad O'Carroll	Hedges; Cutfather & Joe^{[a]}	3:19
3.	"I Shall Be There" (featuring Ladysmith Black Mambazo)			4:12
4.	"Jump Down"	Tracy Ackerman; Brannigan; Hedges	Hedges; Cutfather & Joe^{[a]}	3:04
5.	"Someday"			3:27
6.	"Leaves"			3:15
7.	"The Shy One"			3:09
8.	"Red Indian Girl"	Armaou; Hedges; E. Lynch; K. Lynch; O'Carroll		3:35
9.	"It Was Our Day"			3:20
10.	"My Superman"			3:02
11.	"Are You a Ghost?"			3:34
12.	"In Fields Where We Lay"			2:27
Total length:				40:01

UK limited edition bonus track
No.	Title	Writer(s)	Length
5.	"Blame It on the Weatherman"	Ackerman; Brannigan; Andy Caine; Hedges	3:33
Total length:			43:34

US and Canada bonus track
No.	Title	Writer(s)	Length
13.	"Blame It on the Weatherman" (orchestral version)	Ackerman; Brannigan; Caine; Hedges	3:31
Total length:			43:32

US Target edition bonus tracks
No.	Title	Writer(s)	Producer(s)	Length
14.	"Jesse Hold On" (HB Source mix)	Armaou; Brannigan; Hedges; Hodgens; E. Lynch; K. Lynch; O'Carroll	Hedges; Nigel Butler^{[a]}	6:14
15.	"To You I Belong" (Wide Slam remix)			5:25
16.	"Blame It on the Weatherman" (Chicane vocal edit)	Ackerman; Brannigan; Caine; Hedges	Hedges; Chicane^{[a]}	5:00
Total length:				60:11

Notes

- ^a signifies remix and additional production

== Personnel ==
=== B*Witched ===
- Lindsay Armaou – backing vocals
- Edele Lynch – lead vocals
- Keavy Lynch – backing vocals
- Sinéad O'Carroll – backing vocals

=== Musicians ===
- Erwin Keiles – guitar, bass guitar
- Robert Hodgens – guitar
- Anne Dudley – strings (arrangement)
- Martin Simmons – harmonica
- BJ Cole – pedal steel guitar
- Miriam Stockley – additional vocals
- Tessa Niles – additional vocals

== Charts and certifications ==
=== Weekly charts ===
Chart (1999)	Peak position
Australian Albums (ARIA)	70
European Albums (Billboard)	27
Irish Albums (IRMA)	16
New Zealand Albums (RMNZ)	27
Scottish Albums (OCC)	5
UK Albums (Official Charts)	5
US Billboard 200	91

=== Year-end charts ===
Chart (1999)	Position
UK Albums (OCC)	54

=== Certifications ===
Region	Certification	Certified units/sales
New Zealand (RMNZ)	Gold	7,500^{^}
United Kingdom (BPI)	Platinum	300,000^{^}
United States (RIAA)	Gold	500,000^{^}
^{^} Shipments figures based on certification alone.
