= Barbarellas =

Irish pop duo

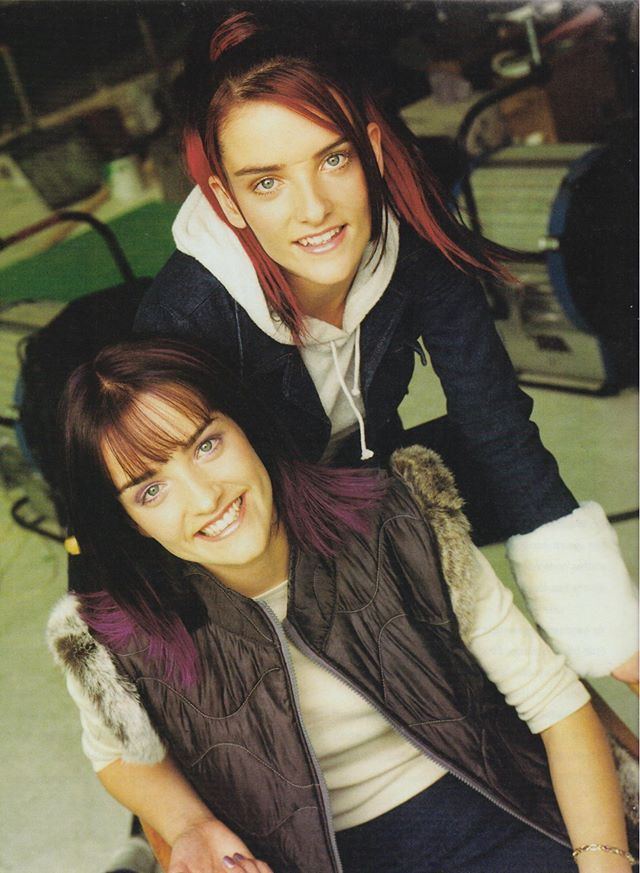
- Edele and Keavy Lynch in 1998

Background information
- Also known as: Ms. Lynch (2006–2009)
- Born: Dublin, Ireland
- Genres: Pop; electropop
- Years active: 2006–2012
- Labels: Ceol
- Spinoff of: B*Witched
- Past members: Edele Lynch; Keavy Lynch

Barbarellas (previously known as Ms. Lynch) were an Irish pop duo, consisting of twins Edele and Keavy Lynch (born 15 December 1979), former members of pop girl group B*Witched. The duo were signed to Ceol Music, and released their debut album Night Mode in 2011.

== History ==
After B*Witched split, in 2002, Edele worked as a songwriter with the Xenomania production team, co-writing tracks for Girls Aloud and Sugababes, while Keavy established an Irish music production company called Ziiiing. From 2006 until 2009, the Lynch twins performed live in festivals and night clubs as Ms. Lynch, as well as posting several demos on their MySpace page.

In 2010 they renamed the duo as Barbarellas and, on 19 January 2011, the duo's debut single "Body Rock" was released, produced by Yoad Nevo, and remixed by Manhattan Clique and Riffs&Rays. Popjustice called the song "basically a completely amazing chorus with some slightly less amazing other stuff thrown in". Their second single, "Night Mode" (originally titled "Diet Coke"), was released on 10 April 2011 to a mixed reaction from fans, who criticised the change from "Diet Coke" to "Night Mode". The duo's debut album Night Mode was released on 17 April 2011 to a mixed reception from critics, and like the singles, did not appear in the Top 100. The duo ended in October 2012 when it was announced that B*Witched would reunite.

== Discography ==
=== Studio albums ===
List of albums, with selected chart positions
Title	Album details
Night Mode	Released 17 April 2011; Label: Ceol Music; Formats: CD, digital download

=== Singles ===
Title	Year	Album
"Body Rock"	2011	Night Mode
"Night Mode"	2011	Night Mode
