= Sound of the Underground (album) =

2003 studio album by Girls Aloud

Studio album by Girls Aloud
- Released: 23 May 2003
- Recorded: November 2002 – April 2003
- Genres: Dance-pop; power pop; pop rock; teen pop; drum and bass
- Length: 53:44 (standard); 55:04 (reissue)
- Label: Polydor
- Producers: Steve Anderson; Anders Bagge; Arnthor Birgisson; Beatmasters; Betty Boo * Denis Ingoldsby; Brian Higgins; Tim Kellett; Gary Miller; Peters & Peters; Brian Rawling; Graham Stack; Jeremy Wheatley; Xenomania

Girls Aloud chronology
Sound of the Underground (2003)	What Will the Neighbours Say? (2004)

Reissue edition cover

Singles from Sound of the Underground
- 1. "Sound of the Underground" Released: 16 December 2002; 2. "No Good Advice" Released: 12 May 2003; 3. "Life Got Cold" Released: 18 August 2003; 4. "Jump" Released: 17 November 2003

Sound of the Underground is the debut studio album by English-Irish girl group Girls Aloud, released by Polydor Records on 23 May 2003. The group recorded the album following their formation on the ITV talent series Popstars: The Rivals and the chart-topping success of their debut single, "Sound of the Underground". Its production involved several British and European songwriting teams, although Brian Higgins and Xenomania substantially reworked the project shortly before completion, replacing several songs with newly recorded material.

Musically, the album combines pop, new wave and power pop with electronic styles including big beat, drum and bass and UK garage. Critics frequently compared its guitar-led production and vocal arrangements to Blondie, Bananarama and the Bangles. The album produced the singles "Sound of the Underground", "No Good Advice" and "Life Got Cold". A November 2003 reissue added the group's cover of the Pointer Sisters' "Jump", recorded for the film Love Actually.

Sound of the Underground received generally favourable reviews, with critics praising its singles and regarding it as unusually accomplished for a release by a reality-television act, although its ballads and later tracks attracted criticism. The album debuted at number two on the UK Albums Chart and was certified platinum by the British Phonographic Industry (BPI). A 20th-anniversary edition, including previously unreleased material and the album's first vinyl release, followed in June 2023.

== Background ==
Girls Aloud were formed through ITV's Popstars: The Rivals, a reality television series presented by Davina McCall that sought to create a boy band and girl group who would compete for the Christmas number one spot in the UK Singles Chart, a traditionally competitive time in the British music market. Broadcast from September to December 2002, the programme followed the success of the original Popstars, which had produced the band Hear'Say in February 2001, and attracted several thousand applicants at auditions held across the United Kingdom. Judges Pete Waterman, Louis Walsh and Spice Girls member Geri Halliwell selected ten girls and ten boys to proceed to the televised stages of the competition. The finalists subsequently performed in a series of live Saturday-night shows, with the public determining which contestants would remain through telephone voting. Following a series of eliminations, Cheryl Tweedy, Nicola Roberts, Nadine Coyle, Kimberley Walsh and Sarah Harding were selected from the remaining six female finalists to form the girl group Girls Aloud and sign with Polydor in November 2002.

As part of the programme's format, Girls Aloud were placed in direct competition with the newly formed One True Voice, the winning male group, to determine the 2002 Christmas number one. Chosen by their manager Louis Walsh as their debut single, the group rapidly recorded "Sound of the Underground," along with a cover of East 17's "Stay Another Day." Released on 16 December 2002, "Sound of the Underground" entered the UK Singles Chart at number one, defeating One True Voice's "Sacred Trust" to become the 2002 Christmas number-one single. It remained at the top of the chart for four consecutive weeks and was certified platinum by the British Phonographic Industry (BPI) in March 2003. The result was unexpected, as One True Voice's more traditional cover had been expected to appeal more strongly to a Saturday-night television audience. The single nevertheless received unusually favourable critical attention for a reality television release, with critics viewing it as pop that transcended its origins, and also marked the beginning of Girls Aloud's association with Brian Higgins and his Xenomania production team, who would become central to the group's subsequent sound.

== Recording ==
Following the success of the single, Girls Aloud began recording their debut album, which was eventually also titled Sound of the Underground. Executives at Polydor assembled a range of predominantly British songwriters, musicians and producers to contribute to the project, including Betty Boo, the Beatmasters, Graham Stack, Steve Anderson and Tim Kellett, with Boo and the Beatmasters contributing the majority of the material. Separate sessions were also held with Swedish musicians Anders Bagge and Arnthor Birgisson as well as Henrik Korpi and Mathias Johansson from duo Korpi & Blackcell. The resulting material reflected a range of styles and production approaches, from the emerging indie sound of the period to the distinctive pop style developed by Xenomania on "Sound of the Underground."

Higgins and Xenomania also reunited with the group, initially producing one further track, "No Good Advice." After hearing the other ten tracks recorded for the album, Higgins expressed concern to Polydor's A&R director that the material lacked cohesion, describing the collection as a "disaster." He later recalled that the album comprised "two completely separate groups," with the Scandinavian-influenced material and the work of the other producers contrasting sharply with the sound developed by Xenomania, and proposed replacing six of the tracks to create a more unified sound. Polydor accepted the proposal, and Girls Aloud returned to the studio with Xenomania to record four additional songs they had developed, including "Some Kind of Miracle", "Life Got Cold", "Stop" and "Love/Hate." The new material replaced tracks by Anderson, Korpi & Blackcell, Nigel Lowis and Paul Meehan, some of which were later issued on subsequent editions of the album. Completed in April 2003, Sound of the Underground was subsequently described as a blend of "Blondie and Bananarama, with a smattering of the Spice Girls at their best."

During the summer of 2003, Girls Aloud would again work with Higgins and Xenomania, recording a further three tracks – a cover version of the Duran Duran hit "Girls on Film", which would become the B-side of "Life Got Cold", "You Freak Me Out" for the film Freaky Friday and a cover version of The Pointer Sisters song "Jump" for the film Love Actually. They also re-recorded "Some Kind of Miracle", which was originally intended to be the fourth single from the album before it was scrapped in favour of "Jump". These four tracks, alongside an altered mix of "Life Got Cold", would eventually surface on a reissued version of Sound of the Underground, which was released on 17 November 2003.

== Music and lyrics ==
Sound of the Underground takes influence from a number of 1980s genres, such as synthpop, power pop, and new wave, and 1990s styles like big beat, drum and bass, and garage. The album received comparisons to girl groups such as Bananarama, The Bangles and Spice Girls. Similarities to Kylie Minogue and Madonna were also noted. A majority of the songs make use of guitars and electronic beats. The rise of indie rock also inspired Brian Higgins to "blur the edges between commercial music and so-called "indie" music." He continued, "pop music was on its backside and indie music was about to rise, through The Strokes and everything else. We were an independent company and we were as indie as the other bands around us."

It was said that the album's "lyrics [were] curiously insistent upon Girls Aloud's musical credibility and autonomy of thought." Higgins said that "No Good Advice" reflected his general mood of failure after a special deal between Xenomania and London Records fell through in 2000, and about persisting in spite of what people told him to do or not to do. "Life Got Cold" was labelled "surprisingly poignant."

== Songs ==
"Sound of the Underground", which opens the album, drew comparisons to Fatboy Slim. It was labelled "an enticing blend of spiky guitars and Fatboy Slim beats topped off with an irresistibly catchy chorus." "Sound of the Underground" was further described as "a mechanistic sashay of twangy surf guitar and sultry gang vocals – Girls Aloud explodes like a five-headed Kylie Minogue." "No Good Advice" was labelled "a disco track with guitar – a cross between Blondie and The Bangles." Unlike many other songs, it was said to be "not obsessed with trying to be a cutting-edge club hit, [...] with at least three different killer hooks welded together" that borrowed heavily from the 1980s. "Some Kind of Miracle", which is "a breezy summer pop song about trying to bag a guy", follows. The Xenomania production had "layered vocals with its slow tempo despite being more formulaic." The song was compared to "a 21st century Bangles", as well as former Spice Girls member and Popstars: The Rivals judge Geri Halliwell.

"All I Need (All I Don't)" was described as "a Kylie-type tune set to squelchy techno", as well as "a disco-funk workout with traces of Cameo and Bedtime Stories vintage Madonna". "Life Got Cold", the album's first ballad and third single, was a late addition to the album, completed by Xenomania shortly before the album's release. The song received attention because of similarities between the guitar riff of "Life Got Cold" and that of the Oasis hit "Wonderwall" (1995). Warner/Chappell Music has since credited Oasis songwriter Noel Gallagher. The song was called a "charming ballad" that was "a sweet but slightly sad pop song". The song begins with a rap. "Mars Attack", produced by Betty Boo and the Beatmasters, "is hip hop-referencing surf punk."

"Stop", a Xenomania production sung entirely by Nadine Coyle apart from the chorus, "starts like the Skids' "Into the Valley" but gets sultry instead of surreal." The album's eighth track, "Girls Allowed", was co-written by Westlife member Brian McFadden. It was described as both "Basement Jaxx meets Spice Girls" and "Donna Summer meets Dannii Minogue". "Forever and a Night" was described as "a soppy love song earmarked as a Christmas single", but slated for sounding like "every girl-group slushy song ever written." "Love/Hate", another song crafted by Xenomania, "lays vocals over garage beats." A second contribution from Betty Boo and the Beatmasters, "Boogie Down Love", follows. It was said that it "mixes the hook of Blondie's "Call Me" with the bells from "Rapture"", as well as being deemed "electro stomping". "Don't Want You Back" was co-written by Anders Bagge, who also wrote Samantha Mumba's "Gotta Tell You", which bears similarities. It was labelled as a "love song" in which Girls Aloud are "swooning over bois [sic]". "White Lies" was co-written and produced by Tim Kellett, a former member of The Durutti Column, Simply Red, and Olive.

The original UK edition of the album featured two bonus tracks. "Love Bomb", another Betty Boo collaboration, was compared to Boo's "Where Are You Baby?". "Everything You Ever Wanted" borrows its opening line from The Rolling Stones. In December 2003, the album was re-released with the omission of "Don't Want You Back" and the bonus tracks. Three new songs appeared instead. "Jump", a cover of The Pointer Sisters, was recorded for the soundtrack to Love Actually (2003). Cheryl Cole noted in Girls Aloud's autobiography Dreams That Glitter (2008) that the single "was the point when we realized everything we'd been doing was quite down and moody [...] and that's not what people wanted." "You Freak Me Out" is a pop-rock song that was written and recorded for the Disney film Freaky Friday (2003), It also included was Girls Aloud's cover of "Girls on Film", originally a Duran Duran classic, that originally appeared as a B-side to "Life Got Cold".

== Release and promotion ==
Sound of the Underground was released in Ireland on 23 May 2003 and in the United Kingdom and European countries three days later, through Polydor Records and Universal Music Group. The international versions of the album exclude the bonus tracks "Love Bomb" and "Everything You Ever Wanted". A reissue of Sound of the Underground was released on 17 November 2003. It replaced the original bonus tracks and "Don't Want You Back" with three new songs: "Jump", "You Freak Me Out", and "Girls on Film". The radio edit of "Life Got Cold" and a remix of "Some Kind of Miracle" appeared in place of the original versions. Originally, the album would be promoted with a tour with their fellow Popstars: The Rivals contestants; however, the tour was cancelled due to poor ticket sales. Instead, the group promoted the album on their What Will the Neighbours Say...? Tour (2005) along with their second studio album What Will the Neighbours Say? (2004). Sound of the Underground and other Girls Aloud releases were made available for sale on the US iTunes Store on 26 June 2007 through Interscope Records.

On 26 March 2023, it was reported that the remaining members of Girls Aloud are to share unreleased tracks from the archives, to celebrate the 20th anniversary of the album. On 28 April 2023, the band released the promotional single "Sound Of The Underground (Alternative Vocal Mix)", revealed the tracklisting for the forthcoming album reissue, and released a new 4k version of the original music video. The 2023 reissue will be available on vinyl for the very first time.

== Singles ==
"Sound of the Underground", Girls Aloud's debut single, was released on 16 December 2002. The song was one of sixty songs that Brian Higgins and Miranda Cooper had written with the aim of launching their own girl group. The song was originally recorded in 2001 by London girl group Orchid, who disbanded before gaining a firm record deal. Competing against the Popstars: The Rivals boyband, One True Voice, Girls Aloud used a combative "Buy girls, bye boys" slogan to persuade the public to buy their recording of the song. "Sound of the Underground" received a positive response from most music critics. The music video was shot in a London warehouse just days after Girls Aloud's formation in the last week of competition of Popstars: The Rivals. "Sound of the Underground" debuted at number one on the UK Singles Chart and spent four consecutive weeks at number one, earning a platinum certification in March 2003.

"No Good Advice" was released five months later in May 2003. Girls Aloud deliberately waited five months after the release of "Sound of the Underground" in order to ensure they would have a strong second single. Higgins said that the band initially did not like the song – "we played them some of it, and they said: 'That's not our sound.' I objected to the use of that phrase 'our sound'. I told them they had five minutes to talk about whether or not they wanted to continue with me. They went away and spoke about it and since then it's been fine. They come in expecting to work, and there's a trust there which, I think, dates back to that day." In 2003, the song won the Popjustice £20 Music Prize, awarded to the best British pop single of the past year. The video for "No Good Advice" features the members of Girls Aloud clad in metallic, silver, futuristic outfits which can also be seen on the cover of this album. The song debuted at number two.

The third single was intended to be "Some Kind of Miracle", but was changed to fan favourite "Life Got Cold". The music video depicts the band members in stunted movement, wandering around an abandoned city setting. The song failed to achieve the success of Girls Aloud's first two singles, peaking at number three. "Some Kind of Miracle" was replaced again, this time with their cover of "Jump", recorded for the Love Actually soundtrack. The music video for "Jump" was made to appear like it was intertwined with Love Actually. The song debuted at number two on the UK Singles Chart. "You Freak Me Out" was due for release, with Girls Aloud even performing it on television; however, Girls Aloud proceeded to record their second studio album What Will the Neighbours Say?.

== Critical reception ==
Professional ratings
Review scores
Source	Rating
AllMusic	2.5/5 stars
Drowned in Sound	8/10
Entertainment.ie	3/5 stars
Evening Standard	1/3 marks
The Guardian	3/5 stars
RTÉ.ie	3/5 stars
Yahoo! Music	8/10 stars

Critical reception of Sound of the Underground was broadly positive, with reviewers praising its distinctive production, catchy songwriting and energetic pop sound, while criticism largely focused on its excessive length, weaker ballads, formulaic material and the manufactured nature of the group. Johnny Loftus of AllMusic regarded the album as an effective introduction to a distinctive Girls Aloud sound, drawing attention to its inventive production, surf-rock guitar, dance-pop grooves and the strength of singles such as "Sound of the Underground" and "No Good Advice." He also noted its consistency and stylistic variety, although he considered the members' voices relatively similar, placing greater emphasis on their collective sound and production." Lisa Verrico of The Times similarly focused on the album's combination of "attitude, aggression, guitars, disco beats" and Phil Spector-influenced production. She singled out "Some Kind of Miracle" as a breezy highlight, while finding the record less consistent when it moved towards more conventional ballad material. Alexis Petridis of The Guardian found the album energetic and playful, citing the title track's irresistible chorus and Fatboy Slim-style dynamics alongside its "spiky guitars" and "zippy beats." He also observed that the album's repeated assertions of Girls Aloud's musical independence carried an element of self-aware humour, given the group's highly managed pop origins.

Adie Nunn of Drowned in Sound, awarding the album 8/10, considered it unusually strong for a pop debut, arguing that it contained considerably fewer filler tracks than was typical of the genre. He highlighted its recurring surf-guitar motif, upbeat songwriting and eclectic mixture of influences, including Betty Boo, the Propellerheads, the Spice Girls and Kylie Minogue, concluding that it was an entertaining record capable of putting "a smile on your face and a swing in your step." Angus Batey of Yahoo! Music described Sound of the Underground as a "seriously fine debut album" and drew comparisons with the carefully constructed pop of the Spice Girls. He identified several tracks as potential hits and regarded the album's variety and songwriting as evidence that Girls Aloud had the material necessary to establish themselves beyond their reality-television origins. BBC News's likewise viewed the album as unexpectedly strong, describing its sound as "pulsating pop" and identifying "Sound of the Underground" and "No Good Advice" as its principal strengths, with the latter characterised as "totally irresistible." He also highlighted "Some Kind of Miracle" and "Life Got Cold", but considered the 15-track running time excessive and found parts of the remaining material formulaic. Jacqueline Hodges of BBC Music described the record as "punchy, sassed-up pop" driven by "neo drum and bass beats", noting its catchy songwriting and Betty Boo's contributions to "Mars Attack" and "Boogie Down Love". While she felt the album began to drag towards its conclusion, she nevertheless regarded it as "an impressive debut" capable of challenging the scepticism surrounding the group.

RTÉ.ie editor Anne-Louise Foley placed the album "at the better end of the commercial pop scale", particularly for its catchy singles and energetic production. She highlighted "Sound of the Underground", "No Good Advice", "Some Kind of Miracle", "Stop" and "Life Got Cold", but considered the album overlong and increasingly repetitive, with several of its ballads among its weaker material. Kitty Empire of The Observer approached the album in the context of the wider debate surrounding manufactured pop, arguing that Girls Aloud's appeal ultimately rested on "tunes and class" rather than conventional notions of musical authenticity. She identified "Sound of the Underground" and "No Good Advice" as "two brilliant singles" and characterised the album as "a pretty essential cultural artefact." Entertainment.ie similarly found the record effective within the conventions of mainstream pop, highlighting its "spiky guitars and Fatboy Slim beats," while criticising its 15-track length and weaker ballads. John Aizlewood from The Evening Standard was more sceptical of the group's artistic substance, characterising Sound of the Underground as "factory-farmed manufactured pop." Nevertheless, he acknowledged that its commercial construction did not prevent it from being enjoyable, singling out the title track, which he noted "roars along splendidly.". Paul Nolan of Hot Press offered the most negative assessment, calling the album a "reasonably diverting slice of mainstream pop" but ultimately "about as substantial as tissue-paper and twice as expendable." He found tracks including "No Good Advice", "Life Got Cold" and "Girls Allowed" excessively formulaic and argued that the glossy production weakened even the more stylistically varied material, including "Love Bomb."

== Commercial performance ==
Sound of the Underground debuted at number two on the UK Albums Chart, behind Justin Timberlake's Justified (2002). It spent 16 weeks in the UK top 100 during its original chart run. A November 2003 reissue subsequently re-entered the chart at number 42, spending a further six weeks in the top 100. The album also ranked at number 71 on the 2003 UK year-end albums chart. It later returned to number 42 in 2023 following the release of its deluxe edition, while a separate chart entry reached number 67 in 2007. On 6 June 2003, Sound of the Underground was certified gold by the British Phonographic Industry (BPI) and platinum five months later. By the time Girls Aloud initially disbanded in March 2013, it had sold 368,000 copies in the United Kingdom. Reported UK sales had risen to 380,885 copies by November 2023. Outside the UK, the album achieved its strongest chart position in Ireland, where it peaked at number six on the Irish Albums Chart. It also reached number 10 on the European Top 100 Albums, while placing at number 20 in Greece and number 53 in the Netherlands.

== Track listing ==
Original version
No.	Title	Writer(s)	Producer(s)	Length
1.	"Sound of the Underground"	Miranda Cooper; Brian Higgins; Niara Scarlett	Higgins; Xenomania	3:41
2.	"No Good Advice"	Cooper; Higgins; Nick Coler; Lisa Cowling; Lene Nystrøm	Higgins; Xenomania	3:48
3.	"Some Kind of Miracle"	Cooper; Higgins; Cowling; Tim Powell; Shawn Lee; Edele Lynch	Higgins; Xenomania; Jeremy Wheatley	3:09
4.	"All I Need (All I Don't)"	Ava Knox; Chris Peters; Drew Peters	Peters & Peters	3:38
5.	"Life Got Cold"	Cooper; Higgins; Coler; Cowling; Noel Gallagher	Higgins; Xenomania	3:57
6.	"Mars Attack"	Alison Clarkson; Paul Carter; Amanda Glanfield	Betty Boo and the Beatmasters	3:28
7.	"Stop"	Cooper; Higgins; Matt Gray	Higgins; Xenomania	3:35
8.	"Girls Allowed"	Brian McFadden; Jonathan Shorten	Graham Stack	3:26
9.	"Forever and a Night"	Gary Miller; Mark Mueller; Andy Goldmark	Miller; Brian Rawling	3:17
10.	"Love/Hate"	Higgins; Scarlett; Eve Bicker	Higgins; Xenomania	4:40
11.	"Boogie Down Love"	Clarkson; Carter; Glanfield	Betty Boo and the Beatmasters	3:22
12.	"Don't Want You Back"	Anders Bagge; Michelle Bell; Arnthor Birgisson	Arnthor & BAG	3:19
13.	"White Lies"	Tim Kellett; Sandria Nordstrom	Kellett	4:00

UK bonus tracks
No.	Title	Writer(s)	Producer(s)	Length
14.	"Love Bomb"	Clarkson; Mike Ward; Shaun Ward	Betty Boo and the Beatmasters	2:55
15.	"Everything You Ever Wanted"	Steve Anderson; Steve Lee; Lisa Greene	Anderson	2:53
Total length:				53:44

20th anniversary edition disc 2
No.	Title	Writer(s)	Producer(s)	Length
1.	"Sound of the Underground" (alternative vocal mix)	Cooper; Higgins; Scarlet	Higgins; Xenomania	3:39
2.	"Jump" (from Love Actually)	Steve Mitchell; Marti Sharron; Gary Skardina	Higgins; Xenomania	3:39
3.	"Girls on Film"	Duran Duran	Xenomania	3:40
4.	"Lights, Music, Camera, Action"	Nigel Lowis; Paul Meehan; Lee	Lowis; Meehan	3:11
5.	"On a Round"	Karen Poole; Henrik Korpi; Mathias Johansson	Korpi & BlackCell	2:42
6.	"No Good Advice" (parental advisory version)	Cooper; Higgins; Coler; Cowling; Nystrøm	Higgins; Xenomania	3:46
7.	"Sacred Trust"	Bee Gees	Ian Curnow	5:00
8.	"Life Got Cold" (radio edit)	Cooper; Higgins; Coler; Cowling; Gallagher	Higgins; Xenomania	3:29
9.	"Grease" (from Greasemania)	Barry Gibb	Betty Boo & The Beatmasters	3:27
10.	"Hopelessly Devoted to You" (from Greasemania)	John Farrar	Stack	3:14
11.	"Some Kind of Miracle" (new mix)	Cooper; Higgins; Cowling; Powell; Lee; Lynch	Higgins; Xenomania; Wheatley	3:19
12.	"You Freak Me Out" (from Freaky Friday)	Cooper; Higgins; Powell; Nystrøm	Higgins; Xenomania	3:05
13.	"No Good Advice" (original demo)	Cooper; Higgins; Coler; Cowling; Nystrøm	Higgins; Xenomania	3:52
14.	"Stay Another Day"	Tony Mortimer; Dominic Hawken; Rob Kean	Denis Ingoldsby (executive); Andrew Murray; Christian Ballard	4:20
Total length:				50:34

20th anniversary edition disc 3
No.	Title	Writer(s)	Producer(s)	Length
1.	"Sound of the Underground" (instrumental breakdown mix)	Cooper; Higgins; Scarlet	Higgins; Xenomania	3:36
2.	"Girls Allowed" (almighty radio edit; from Love Actually)	McFadden; Shorten	Stack	4:06
3.	"Some Kind of Miracle" (illicit mix)	Cooper; Higgins; Cowling; Powell; Lee; Lynch	Higgins; Xenomania	7:54
4.	"Life Got Cold" (Stella Browne vocal mix)	Cooper; Higgins; Coler; Cowling; Gallagher	Higgins; Xenomania	7:34
5.	"No Good Advice" (Dreadzone vocal mix)	Cooper; Higgins; Coler; Cowling; Nystrøm	Higgins; Xenomania; Jon Shave	6:55
6.	"Jump" (Almighty vocal mix)	Steve Mitchell; Marti Sharron; Gary Skardina	Higgins; Xenomania	7:36
7.	"Sound of the Underground" (Flip & Fill remix)	Cooper; Higgins; Scarlet	Higgins; Wheatley	5:33
8.	"Life Got Cold" (29 Palms remix edit)	Cooper; Higgins; Coler; Cowling; Gallagher	Higgins; Xenomania	6:53
9.	"No Good Advice" (Flip & Fill remix)	Cooper; Higgins; Coler; Cowling; Nystrøm	Higgins; Whealey; Xenomania; Shave	6:27
10.	"Jump" (Flip & Fill remix)	Steve Mitchell; Marti Sharron; Gary Skardina		6:15
11.	"No Good Advice" (Doublefunk vocal mix)	Cooper; Higgins; Coler; Cowling; Nystrøm	Higgins; Xenomania; Shave	7:28
12.	"Girls Allowed" (Almighty vocal mix)	McFadden; Shorten	Stack	6:15
Total length:				76:55

UK 2003 re-issue
No.	Title	Writer(s)	Producer(s)	Length
1.	"Sound of the Underground"	Cooper; Higgins; Scarlett	Higgins; Xenomania	3:41
2.	"No Good Advice"	Cooper; Higgins; Coler; Cowling; Nystrøm	Higgins; Xenomania	3:48
3.	"Life Got Cold" (radio edit)	Cooper; Higgins; Coler; Cowling; Gallagher	Higgins; Xenomania	3:57
4.	"Jump" (from Love Actually)	Steve Mitchell; Marti Sharron; Gary Skardina	Higgins; Xenomania	3:39
5.	"Some Kind of Miracle" (new mix)	Cooper; Higgins; Cowling; Powell; Lee; Lynch	Higgins; Xenomania; Wheatley	3:19
6.	"All I Need (All I Don't)"	Knox; C. Peters; D. Peters	Peters & Peters	3:38
7.	"Mars Attack"	Clarkson; Carter; Glanfield	Betty Boo and the Beatmasters	3:28
8.	"You Freak Me Out" (from Freaky Friday)	Cooper; Higgins; Powell; Nystrøm	Higgins; Xenomania	3:01
9.	"Girls Allowed"	McFadden; Shorten	Stack	3:26
10.	"Forever and a Night"	Miller; Mueller; Goldmark	Miller; Rawling	3:17
11.	"Love/Hate"	Higgins; Scarlett; Bicker	Higgins; Xenomania	4:40
12.	"Boogie Down Love"	Clarkson; Carter; Glanfield	Betty Boo and the Beatmasters	3:22
13.	"Stop"	Cooper; Higgins; Gray	Xenomania	3:35
14.	"White Lies"	Kellett; Nordstrom	Kellett	3:06
15.	"Girls on Film" (United Kingdom bonus track)	Duran Duran	Xenomania	3:42
16.	"Sound of the Underground" (music video)	Cooper; Higgins; Scarlett; Xenomania	Xenomania	3:46
17.	"No Good Advice" (music video)	Cooper; Higgins; Coler; Cowling; Nystrøm	Xenomania	3:54
18.	"Life Got Cold" (music video)	Cooper; Higgins; Coler; Cowling; Gallagher	Xenomania	4:05
Total length:				55:04

Covers and other appearances

- "Jump" is a cover of The Pointer Sisters.
- "Girls on Film" is a cover of the UK band Duran Duran.
- The track "Girls on Film" appeared as a B-side to their single "Life Got Cold".
- The tracks "Love Bomb" and "Girls Allowed" appeared as B-sides to their single "Jump".
- "You Freak Me Out" was recorded specially for the film Freaky Friday.

== Charts ==
=== Weekly charts ===
Weekly chart performance for Sound of the Underground
Chart (2003)	Peak position
Dutch Albums (Album Top 100)	53
European Albums (Music & Media)	10
Greek Albums (IFPI)	20
Irish Albums (IRMA)	6
UK Albums (Official Charts)	2

=== Year-end charts ===
Year-end chart performance for Sound of the Underground
Chart (2003)	Position
UK Albums (OCC)	71

== Certifications ==
Certifications for Sound of the Underground
Region	Certification	Certified units/sales
United Kingdom (BPI)	Platinum	393,572

== Release history ==
List of release dates, showing region, edition(s), format(s), label(s), catalog number and reference(s).
Region	Date	Edition(s)	Format(s)	Label(s)	Catalog	Ref.
Ireland	23 May 2003	Standard	CD; digital download	Polydor	9865315	
Europe	26 May 2003	Standard	CD; digital download	Universal Music	9865319	
United Kingdom	26 May 2003	Standard	CD; digital download	Polydor	9865315	
Ireland	17 November 2003	Reissue	CD; digital download	Polydor	9865961	
United Kingdom	17 November 2003	Reissue	CD; digital download	Polydor	9865961	
United States	26 June 2007	Standard	Digital download	Interscope	—N/a	
Various	16 June 2023	Deluxe 20th anniversary edition	CD, digital download, streaming, vinyl	Universal Music Operations	—N/a	
