= Buffalo G =

Irish girl group

- Origin: Dublin, Ireland
- Genres: Pop
- Years active: 2000
- Label: Epic Records
- Past members: Naomi Lynch; Olive Tucker

Buffalo G were an Irish girl group who were active in 2000. The duo consisted of Naomi Lynch (born 6 April 1983) and Olive Tucker (born 4 August 1983). The duo released one single in Ireland and the United Kingdom: "We're Really Saying Something", a rap cover version of the 1982 song by Bananarama, itself a cover of the 1964 original version by the Velvelettes. The song, released on 29 May 2000, peaked at number 13 in Ireland in June 2000 and remained in the Irish charts for three weeks; it reached number 17 in the United Kingdom and was in the top 40 for two weeks. Their debut album was shelved and the duo disbanded following the release of this song.

Lynch is the younger sister of Edele Lynch and Keavy Lynch of Irish girl group B*Witched, Shane Lynch of the boy band Boyzone, and Tara Lynch of the girl group Fab! She went on to develop a career as a fire dancer. Tucker has since trained within the health and beauty industry, and is now the creative director for Wella.

== Discography ==
=== Single ===
- 2000: "We're Really Saying Something" (Ireland No. 13, UK No. 17)
