= Ripped Jeans =

EP by B*Witched
- Released: 15 August 2024
- Recorded: 2023–2024
- Studio: Jersey
- Length: 11:00
- Label: Sony Music Entertainment UK Limited
- Producer: Mondoray; James Lawton

B*Witched chronology
Champagne or Guinness (2014)	Ripped Jeans (2024)

Singles from Ripped Jeans
- 1. "Birthday" Released: 10 March 2023

Ripped Jeans is the third extended play by Irish girl group B*Witched. It was released on 15 August 2024, through Sony Music Entertainment UK Limited.

Th EP consists of three previously unreleased songs, plus the track "Birthday", which they released in 2023 year to mark their 25th anniversary as a band. All songs were co-written by Ray Hedges, who also co-wrote all the songs on B*Witched and Awake and Breathe. The EP was recorded in Jersey, with the title inspired by lyrics from the track "So Into You" and the band's long-standing association with denim clothing. It marked their first collection of songs released in a decade, following Champagne or Guinness in 2014.

Entertainment-Focus gave a positive review, praising the "swooning vocal harmonies and funk bass" of the track "Multiply", and describing the track "My Greatest Little Mistake" as a "beautifully haunting ballad".

== Track listing ==
Digital
No.	Title	Writer(s)	Producer(s)	Length
1.	"So Into You"	Emily Andrews; Ray Hedges; James Lawton	Mondoray; Lawton	2:25
2.	"Multiply"	Andrews; Hedges	Mondoray	2:54
3.	"My Greatest Little Mistake"	Andrews; Hamish Brodie; Hedges; Lawton	Mondoray	2:42
4.	"Birthday"	Hedges; Danni Le Feuvre	Mondoray	2:37
Total length:				10:38
