= Life Got Cold =

2003 single by Girls Aloud

Single by Girls Aloud

from the album Sound of the Underground
- B-side: "Girls on Film"; "Lights, Music, Camera, Action"
- Released: 18 August 2003
- Genre: Pop rock
- Length: 3:55
- Label: Polydor
- Songwriters: Miranda Cooper; Brian Higgins; Lisa Cowling; Nick Coler; Noel Gallagher
- Producers: Brian Higgins; Xenomania

Girls Aloud singles chronology
"No Good Advice" (2003)	"Life Got Cold" (2003)	"Jump" (2003)

Audio sample
- file; help

Music video
- "Life Got Cold" on YouTube

"Life Got Cold" is a song by British girl group Girls Aloud, taken from their debut album Sound of the Underground (2003). The song was written by Miranda Cooper, Brian Higgins and his production team Xenomania, and produced by Higgins and Xenomania. Noel Gallagher of Oasis received a writing credit due to similarities with Oasis' "Wonderwall".

Released as their third single in August 2003, "Life Got Cold" became Girls Aloud's third consecutive top-three hit on the UK Singles Chart. The song peaked at number two in Ireland and Scotland, and peaked at number 14 in Belgium.

Set in an abandoned city, the music video suggests coldness and darkness with its blue hue. It portrays Girls Aloud moving in stunted movement. "Life Got Cold" was promoted through various live performances and has since been performed on three of Girls Aloud's concert tours. Described as "surprisingly poignant", the melancholic ballad received favourable reviews from contemporary music critics; however, it was criticised for its similarities with Oasis.

== Background and composition ==
"Life Got Cold" is a ballad written in D minor. The chord progressions vary throughout the song but the different chords include B♭, C, Dm, Gm, and Am. Following typical verse-chorus form, the song consists of a verse followed by a bridge and chorus. The verses are "talk-sung", while the bridge and chorus are sung over guitar strumming. The middle 8 is a slower version of the bridge. The song tells the tale of young love that ended "when summer slipped away". "Life Got Cold" was a late addition to Sound of the Underground, completed by Xenomania shortly before the album's release. Producer Brian Higgins did not take the idea of a Girls Aloud version of the song seriously until he heard the group sing it, because a track working "has always got to be based on an artist's performance, not the music itself. But they sang it, and they really nailed the melancholic aspect of it, and it sounded beautiful." The lyrics focus on "the directionlessness of modern life."

The song received attention because of similarities between the guitar riff of "Life Got Cold" and that of the 1995 Oasis hit "Wonderwall". A BBC review stated "part of the chorus sounds like it is going to turn into Wonderwall by Oasis." Warner/Chappell Music later credited Oasis songwriter Noel Gallagher. Girls Aloud later made a cameo appearance in Oasis' 2007 rockumentary Lord Don't Slow Me Down.

== Release ==
"Life Got Cold" was not originally the choice for Girls Aloud's third single. Polydor Records had originally chosen "Some Kind of Miracle" to be released, but the plan was dropped after an overwhelming fan response to "Life Got Cold". The single was released on 18 August 2003 in the UK, available as two different CD singles and a cassette single. The first CD featured a cover of the Duran Duran song "Girls on Film" as the B-side, which would later become the title for a Girls Aloud DVD, as well as a remix of "No Good Advice". The disc's enhanced section features the "Life Got Cold" music video and a photo gallery. The second disc included both the radio edit and album version of "Life Got Cold", as well as the 29 Palms Remix Edit and the Stella Browne Edit. It also came with a free fold-out poster. The cassette also featured an exclusive B-side, an original track entitled "Lights, Music, Camera, Action". The photos featured on the single's artwork were reshot at the last minute, following the group's request. In Australia, a CD single was issued on 29 September 2003.

== Reception ==
=== Critical response ===
"Life Got Cold" received positive reviews from music critics, although it did receive criticism due to the similarities with the song "Wonderwall" by Oasis, to which the songwriters denied claims of plagiarism. BBC called the song a "charming ballad" that was "a sweet but slightly sad pop song." RTÉ.ie thought "Life Got Cold" was "surprisingly poignant". AllMusic referred to it as "a solid ballad, suggesting a less intellectual Dido."

=== Chart performance ===
The song entered the UK Singles Chart at number three, behind Blu Cantrell's "Breathe" and Lemar's "Dance (With U)". It spent a second week in the top ten, slipping to number eight. The song spent a total of nine weeks in the top 75 overall, a far cry from the fourteen weeks "No Good Advice" or the twenty-one weeks that "Sound of the Underground" spent in the chart. "Life Got Cold" also debuted at number three on the Irish Singles Chart, but managed to rise to number two the following week. It spent two further weeks in the top ten, then two weeks in the top twenty. The single barely missed the top ten of the Netherlands Top 40, instead peaking at number eleven. It has since become the group's 16th best selling single domestically.

== Music video ==
The music video for "Life Got Cold" was directed by Phil Griffin, who previously directed the videos for "Sound of the Underground" and "No Good Advice". The band members are seen in stunted movement, wandering around an abandoned city setting. Both group and individual shots are shown in various scenes. Nadine Coyle is seen in front of an abandoned building, while Sarah Harding is next to a car and a phone booth. Nicola Roberts is alone in a kitchen as pouring rain can be seen on the window. Cheryl Tweedy is shown in an alleyway, while Kimberley Walsh is alone on a street curb. The group are shown together on an abandoned bus, in an alley at night, and sat in front of the abandoned building. The video has a slightly blue hue to it, suggesting coldness and darkness. It also makes use of lens flares.

The video can be found on two of Girls Aloud's official DVD releases, Girls on Film (2005) and Style (2007).

== Live performances ==
"Life Got Cold" was first performed live by Girls Aloud at two summer festivals in 2003, Pop Beach and Live & Loud. The first televised performance occurred on CD:UK on 19 July 2003. The group performed in black-and-white business casual attire, as seen in the music video and on the single's artwork. They performed on CD:UK once more the following month, although Cheryl was absent due to illness. Girls Aloud also appeared on Diggin' It, Popworld, Top of the Pops and Top of the Pops Saturday (twice).

Girls Aloud performed "Life Got Cold" on three of their concert tours. For 2005's What Will the Neighbours Say...? Tour, Girls Aloud were positioned at the top of a staircase as they sang the song in colourful, simple evening gowns. The song was given a reggae reworking for 2007's The Greatest Hits Tour. The song was also included on the band's reunion tour, Ten: The Hits Tour.

== Track listings and formats ==
UK CD1 (Polydor; 9810656)

1. "Life Got Cold" (album version edit) – 3:29
2. "Girls on Film" (Duran Duran) – 3:41
3. "No Good Advice" (Doublefunk clean vocal mix) – 7:30
4. "Life Got Cold" (video) – 3:29
5. "Life Got Cold" (photo gallery)

UK CD2 (Polydor; 9810657)

1. "Life Got Cold" (album version edit) – 3:29
2. "Life Got Cold" (radio edit) – 3:57
3. "Life Got Cold" (29 Palms Remix edit) – 6:54
4. "Life Got Cold" (Stella Browne edit) – 5:26

UK cassette single (Polydor; 9810658)

1. "Life Got Cold" (album version edit) – 3:29
2. "Life Got Cold" (radio version) – 3:57
3. "Lights, Music, Camera, Action" (Steve Lee, Nigel Lowis, Paul Meehan) – 3:09

EU CD single (Polydor; 9811183)

1. "Life Got Cold" (radio version) – 3:57
2. "Lights, Music, Camera, Action" – 3:09

The Singles Boxset (CD3)

1. "Life Got Cold" (album version edit) – 3:32
2. "Girls on Film" – 3:43
3. "No Good Advice" (Doublefunk clean vocal mix) – 7:30
4. "Life Got Cold" (radio edit) – 3:29
5. "Life Got Cold" (29 Palms Remix edit) – 6:55
6. "Life Got Cold" (Stella Browne edit) – 5:27
7. "Life Got Cold" (Stella Browne original mix) – 7:02
8. "Lights, Music, Camera, Action" – 3:09
9. "Life Got Cold" (29 Palms Club Remix) – 8:46
10. "Life Got Cold" (Stella Browne Dub) – 7:34
11. "Life Got Cold" (video)
12. "Life Got Cold" (photo gallery)

Life Got Cold Digital EP

1. "Life Got Cold" (album version edit) – 3:55
2. "Girls On Film" – 3:40
3. "Lights, Music, Camera, Action" – 3:08
4. "Life Got Cold" (Stella Browne edit) – 5:25
5. "Life Got Cold" (29 Palms remix edit) – 6:52
6. "Life Got Cold" (edit) – 3:29
7. "Life Got Cold" (Stella Browne vocal mix) – 7:00
8. "Life Got Cold" (29 Palms Remix) – 8:44
9. "Life Got Cold" (Stella Browne dub) – 7:34

== Personnel ==
- Nadine Coyle – co-lead vocals
- Cheryl Tweedy – co-lead vocals
- Sarah Harding – co-lead vocals
- Nicola Roberts – co-lead vocals
- Kimberley Walsh – co-lead vocals

== Charts ==
=== Weekly charts ===
Chart (2003)	Peak position
Belgium (Ultratip Bubbling Under Flanders)	14
Eurochart Hot 100 Singles (Billboard)	12
Ireland (IRMA)	2
Poland Airplay (Polish Airplay Charts)	10
Romania (Romanian Top 100)	78
Scottish Singles Sales (Official Charts)	2
UK Singles (Official Charts)	3
UK Airplay (Music Week)	26

=== Year-end charts ===
Chart (2003)	Position
Ireland (IRMA)	48
UK Singles (OCC)	92
