= Jump Down =

2000 single by B*Witched

Single by B*Witched

from the album Awake and Breathe
- Released: 27 March 2000
- Length: 3:03
- Label: Epic
- Songwriters: Ray Hedges, Martin Brannigan, Tracy Ackerman
- Producers: Ray Hedges, Cutfather & Joe

B*Witched singles chronology
"I Shall Be There" (1999)	"Jump Down" (2000)	"I Wish It Could Be Christmas Everyday" (2013)

"Jump Down" is a song by Irish girl group B*Witched, released as their seventh single. It was released on 27 March 2000 as the third and final single from their second studio album Awake and Breathe (1999). It became their lowest chart peak in the UK top 40, reaching number 16.

== Background ==
"Jump Down" was chosen as the album's third single. It was remixed and given a more edgier and dancier vibe for its release. The girls changed their looks to go along with it, sporting a new 'sexier' image that saw them posing in FHM magazine as well as adapting raunchier dance moves. The song has been criticised because of its nonsensical lyrics, seemingly based around the nursery rhyme "Hey Diddle Diddle". The verses leading up to the chorus say "You ran away with my spoon, you've stolen my heart; always laughin'...I jumped over the moon, right from the start; you always make me feel good..."

== Music video ==
The music video for "Jump Down" features the girls in a long black tunnel with many lights performing an energetic dance routine. This was their first video to feature dancers and was directed by Tim Royes.

== Chart performance ==
"Jump Down" became the group's lowest charting single, peaking at number 16 on the UK Singles Chart. It spent seven weeks on the chart, only two of which were in the top 40. It sold roughly 44,000 copies in the UK and was B*Witched's last single for thirteen years, until they released a cover of "I Wish It Could Be Christmas Everyday" in December 2013 along with the other groups from The Big Reunion.

== Charts ==
Chart (2000)	Peak position
Australia (ARIA)	88
Europe (Eurochart Hot 100)	63
Ireland (IRMA)	26
Scotland Singles (OCC)	18
UK Singles (OCC)	16
