= Fab! =

Irish girl band

- Origin: Dublin, Ireland
- Genres: Pop; dance-pop
- Years active: 1996–2000
- Labels: Break Records 2000 / Polydor; Republic / Universal
- Members: Aileen Melinn; Adrianne Deegan; Tara Lynch; Ruth McIntyre

Fab! (stylized as FAB!) were an Irish girl group from Dublin consisting of Aileen Melinn, Adrianne Deegan, Tara Lynch, and Ruth McIntyre.

== History ==
=== 1996–1998: Formation and debut album ===
The group was assembled and their music was produced by Ben "Jammin" Robbins. The four members – Aileen Melinn, Adrianne Deegan, Tara Lynch, and Ruth McIntyre – were reported to having given up their full-time jobs to be in the group and fulfill their pop dream. Adreanne Deegan and Tara Lynch were professional dance instructors. Lynch's brother, Shane, was a member of the boy band Boyzone, twin sisters Edele and Keavy were in the girl group B*Witched, and another sister, Naomi, would later be in the group Buffalo G.

Fab!'s debut single was "Forever (Not Just Tonight)", released in Ireland on Break Records (cat. nr. BR 101) in early 1997.

In July 1997, they entered the Irish singles chart with a song titled "We Belong Together". The single was released on Break Records and distributed by the Total Record Company via BMG.

In early December 1997, Fab! made their second appearance on RTÉ's television show Echo Island, talking about having recorded in London for Polydor and having trained there with the choreographer who worked with Peter Andre.

Their debut album was titled That's the Kinda Girl. It was released some time in 1997 on Break Records and distributed by Polydor.

Fab!'s most successful song was "Turn Around", that spent three weeks on the UK chart – initially a week in late November 1997 at number 76 and later two weeks in early August 1998 as a re-release, topping out at number 59. Before Fab!, the song had been recorded by Chynna Phillips, formerly of Wilson Phillips, and appeared on her 1995 album Naked and Sacred.

On 14 August 1998, Tara Lynch, then aged 24, confessed she had a son named Dean, then aged 7. She also admitted she was engaged to Andy Lee, a lorry driver she had met two years earlier, and was planning to marry him. Earlier that week, rumours that he had a child and was planning a marriage had been denied by her management. According to The Mirror, Lynch was apparently told to "keep mum" about the matter for another year. "The band are on the verge of signing a massive record deal in the States and are going over there to meet bosses from five record companies. One is believed to be Sony. But news of Tara's son is unlikely to go down well," wrote Neil Michael in his 15 August Mirror article. Tara would ultimately marry Andy Lee on 24 June 2000.

=== 1999–2000 ===
A new single, a cover of Pat Benatar's "Love Is a Battlefield", was planned for release in the summer of 1999 on Recognition Records.

In the same year, 1999, Tara Lynch left the group.

In early 2000, the American magazine Billboard reviewed Fab!'s promo single "Something's Gonna Have to Change" issued on Republic/Universal, writing: "Together with a chorus that beats the band and sends it packing, this standout track will have the masses singing along with the fervor usually reserved for mainstays Britney and Christina. Fortunately, the vocals here are more mature than the likes of many other groups vying for their moment in the light, adding to the delightful charm of this runaway could-be smash." The song was based on Bobby Brown's US number-one hit "My Prerogative", "structurally assuming" its main melody line.

== Discography ==
=== Studio albums ===
Title	Album details
That's the Kinda Girl	Released: 1997; Label: Break Records 2000 BRCD 106 / Polydor; Formats: CD

Repackaged album (Japan)

Title	Album details
Together Forever	Released: 25 July 1998; Label: JPT Records / U.N.I.T.Y Records SMLP-1038; Formats: CD

=== Singles ===
Title	Year	Chart pos.		Album	Notes
Title	Year	IRE	UK	Album	Notes
"Forever (Not Just Tonight)"	1997	—	—	That's the Kinda Girl	Break Records 2000 Ltd. BR 101
"We Belong Together (Together Forever)"	1997	12	—	That's the Kinda Girl	Break Records 2000 Ltd. 103–104 / Polydor
"Turn Around"	1997	27	59	That's the Kinda Girl	Break Records 2000 Ltd. 105, 107 / Polydor
"Love Is a Battlefield"	1999			non-album single	UK, Recognition Records CDREC7 (cancelled?)
"Something's Gonna Have to Change"	1999			non-album single	US, Republic/Universal 0121564582

==== Promo singles ====
Title	Year	Album	Notes
"We Belong Together"	1998	Together Forever	US, U.N.I.T.Y Records SM1037, 12" 33⅓ rpm promo
"Higher" / "We Belong Together"	1998	Together Forever	US, U.N.I.T.Y Records SM1039, 12" 33⅓ rpm promo
