= No Good Advice =

2003 single by Girls Aloud

Single by Girls Aloud

from the album Sound of the Underground
- B-side: "On a Round"
- Released: 12 May 2003
- Genre: Indie rock; dance-rock
- Length: 3:48
- Label: Polydor
- Songwriters: Miranda Cooper; Brian Higgins; Lisa Cowling; Nick Coler; Lene Nystrøm
- Producers: Brian Higgins; Xenomania

Girls Aloud singles chronology
"Sound of the Underground" (2002)	"No Good Advice" (2003)	"Life Got Cold" (2003)

Audio sample
- file; help

Music video
- "No Good Advice" on YouTube

"No Good Advice" is a song by British-Irish girl group Girls Aloud, taken from their debut album, Sound of the Underground (2003). The song was written by Aqua's Lene Nystrøm Rasted, Miranda Cooper, Brian Higgins and his production team Xenomania, and produced by Higgins and Xenomania. The song has themes of rebellion, reflecting Higgins' general mood of failure after a business partnership fell through.

Following the overwhelming success of Girls Aloud's debut single, "Sound of the Underground", the group waited five months until May 2003 before releasing the follow-up. "No Good Advice" cemented their success when it peaked at number two in Ireland and on the UK Singles Chart. "No Good Advice" performed moderately elsewhere, reaching the top 40 in the Netherlands, the top 50 in Belgium, and number 88 in Australia.

The music video features Girls Aloud dressed in futuristic silver outfits and hologram effects. "No Good Advice" was promoted through various live performances and has since been performed on Girls Aloud's first three concert tours. Described as "a disco track with guitar", the song has heavy 1980s influences. The track was lauded by many contemporary music critics, who deemed it a worthy sequel to its predecessor and praised Higgins' production.

== Background and composition ==
Musically, the song was labelled "a disco track with guitar – a cross between Blondie and The Bangles". The song was written in the key of B♭ minor. The song consists of a verse followed by a bridge and chorus. In place of a middle 8, there is a guitar solo instead. The song ends with a spoken outro. The song also contains an interpolation of the guitar riff from the Knack's 1979 hit "My Sharona".

Originally written for Miranda Cooper under the pseudonym Moonbaby, "No Good Advice" seems to be about a rebellious girl who does not need "no good advice" and does things independently. However, according to an interview for The Guardian in July 2004, Brian Higgins said that the song reflected his general mood of failure after a special deal between Xenomania and London Records fell through in 2000, and about persisting in spite of what people told him to do or not to do. The song's chorus originally began with the phrase "I don't like fried rice". "No Good Advice" was sung over a rave backing track, until different Xenomania musicians were asked to contribute new backing tracks. Higgins was inspired by indie rock. He stated, "pop music was on its backside and indie music was about to rise [...] The guitar riff on No Good Advice is very very similar to the riff on the track Michael by Franz Ferdinand."

Brian Higgins said that Girls Aloud initially did not like the song: "We played them some of it, and they said: 'That's not our sound.' I objected to the use of that phrase 'our sound'. I told them they had five minutes to talk about whether or not they wanted to continue with me. They went away and spoke about it and since then it's been fine. They come in expecting to work, and there's a trust there which, I think, dates back to that day."

== Release ==
It took Girls Aloud five months to release "No Good Advice". Nadine Coyle said in an interview with The Lipster, "We were No.1 for a month straight and then getting songs from all these other producers and we were, 'Nah, don't like it'. We waited from December to May before releasing a second single because we knew it had to be our strong point or we might as well kiss our careers goodbye." Kimberley Walsh further exclaimed, "We knew it was strong enough to come back with." Girls Aloud reportedly had to re-record "No Good Advice" because "it features rude words", such as "damn" and "shit". However, the line "Here I am / Dirty hands, I don't give a damn" was kept intact. An explicit version of the song appears on the special edition bonus disc of The Sound of Girls Aloud, replacing the lyric "shut your mouth because it might show" with "shut your mouth because your shit might show". Furthermore, an early demo of the song appears on a singles boxset released in 2009; this demo including the clean lyric in the first bridge and the explicit lyric in the second bridge.

The song was released as a CD single, featuring an exclusive b-side entitled "On a Round", which was later covered by Taiwanese singer Jolin Tsai under the title "Run Run" for her 2009 compilation album Jeneration. The CD format also includes the Dreadzone vocal mix of "No Good Advice" and its music video. The DVD single did not actually feature the "No Good Advice" music video, just a photo gallery and behind-the-scenes footage. It did, however, include audio of the track and the video to "Sound of the Underground". Another remix, the Doublefunk Vocal Mix, was later featured on the "Life Got Cold" single and the remix album Mixed Up.

== Reception ==
=== Critical response ===
"No Good Advice" received mostly positive reviews from music critics. A BBC review described the song as "better than anything else [...] in the charts." Unlike many other songs, it was said to be "not obsessed with trying to be a cutting-edge club hit, [...] with at least three different killer hooks welded together" that borrowed heavily from the 1980s. It was said to be "just as good, if not better" than "Sound of the Underground". It provides "more brassy and in-your-face lyrics of defiance and determination [...] Higgins injects an element of instant-catchy-cool to the songs without going overboard in trying to shape uber-chic dance floor hits." On a less positive side, Tourdates.co.uk said that "No Good Advice" was a failure at adding attitude to Girls Aloud's music and imitates "as many songs as possible." The song has been compared to the Knack's "My Sharona".

In 2003, the song won the Popjustice £20 Music Prize, an annual prize awarded by a panel of judges organised by music website Popjustice to the singer(s) of the best British pop single of the past year. Popjustice founder Peter Robinson wrote that the song "established a motif that would saturate Girls Aloud's string of subsequent singles: an unpredictable and triumphantly contrary desire to push and pull the band in exciting new directions at every turn."

=== Chart performance ===
"No Good Advice" debuted at number two on the UK Singles Chart, held off by R. Kelly's "Ignition Remix". The song slipped to number five in its second week on the chart. The single lasted two more weeks in the top twenty at numbers eleven and seventeen respectively. Overall, "No Good Advice" was inside the top forty for six weeks; it spent an additional eight weeks in the top 75, selling over 105,000 copies. "No Good Advice" suffered a similar fate on the Irish Singles Chart, peaking at number two behind Ireland's Eurovision finalist Mickey Joe Harte. It spent three consecutive weeks at number three, behind Harte and R. Kelly. The song fell to number seven in its fourth week on the Irish chart. It spent four further weeks in the top twenty.

The song also charted in the top fifty in Belgium and the Netherlands, placing at numbers 45 and 26 respectively.

== Music video ==
The video for "No Good Advice" was filmed in April 2003 and was directed by Phil Griffin, who previously directed "Sound of the Underground" and would also direct "Life Got Cold". It features the members of Girls Aloud clad in metallic, silver, futuristic outfits (which are seen on the cover of the original release of their album Sound of the Underground). Girls Aloud fade in and out like holograms, centered around a rusty old car parked near a phone booth. They are joined by several men playing electric guitar, whom they flirt with while in various other poses. In a separate scene, while a black background with bright pinkish lights being emitted from behind, all five girls shake tambourines and dance. The last two scenes are intertwined with neon-coloured animated special effects the background, finally ending with an explosion scene.

In a special programme shown exclusively on MTV to promote their second album What Will the Neighbours Say?, Girls Aloud confessed that they hated the "No Good Advice" video shoot. According to the group, both Cheryl Tweedy and Sarah Harding's trousers ripped and the make-up artist yelled at them. The group woke with bruised thighs the following day. The music video can be found on the group's 2005 DVD release Girls on Film. In the group's 2007 DVD Style, which also features the music video, Girls Aloud were horrified by the video upon watching it again. Regardless, viewers of FHM TV voted the video for "No Good Advice" as the fifth sexiest music video of all time in 2006.

== Live performances ==
"No Good Advice" was performed live for the first time on CD:UK on 5 April 2003, a month ahead of the single's release. Girls Aloud sang in front of a checkered background in red outfits with black accents, as seen on the single's artwork. The group returned to the show three more times to perform "No Good Advice", including a performance using taxi cabs as a prop and another using phone booths. It was performed on Top of the Pops Saturday twice, as well as its parent show. Girls Aloud also visited Blue Peter and Popworld. It was also performed at a number of live events in 2003, such as Spring Break, Pepsi Silver Clef, Party in the Park, the West Belfast Festival, and a festival in Belgium. Girls Aloud also sang the song on Germany's VIVA Interaktiv. In the United Kingdom, Girls Aloud later performed at the Children in Need telethon and on Popworld's Christmas special.

Girls Aloud performed "No Good Advice" on their first three concert tours. For their first tour, 2005's What Will the Neighbours Say...? Tour, Girls Aloud performed the song in school uniforms. The rendition featured an introlude taken from part two of the Pink Floyd song "Another Brick in the Wall". The following year, "No Good Advice" was featured as the second track on the Chemistry Tour. The group, who were created by mad scientists in the show's opening sequence, wore lab coats. The performance, influenced by Broadway, was set in a laboratory as each member was paired with a male dance partner. After a dance break, the mad scientist dancers performed a "magic trick" in which he made Cheryl Cole "disappear" and then reappear. For 2007's The Greatest Hits Tour, Girls Aloud performed "No Good Advice" in lingerie. The stage featured pedestals and platforms which Girls Aloud were on. For 2009's Out of Control Tour, "No Good Advice" was included in a greatest hits medley which closed the show. The song was also performed on the band's 2013 and 2024 reunion tours, Ten: The Hits Tour and The Girls Aloud Show.

== Track listings and formats ==
UK CD single (Polydor; 9800051)

1. "No Good Advice" – 3:48
2. "On a Round" (Karen Poole, H. Korpi, M. Johansson) – 2:45
3. "No Good Advice" (Dreadzone Vocal Mix) – 6:53
4. "No Good Advice" (video) – 3:46

UK cassette single (Polydor; 9800050)

1. "No Good Advice" – 3:48
2. "On a Round" – 2:45

UK DVD single (Polydor; 9800052)

1. "No Good Advice" (audio) – 3:43
2. "Sound of the Underground" (video) – 3:46
3. "No Good Advice" (photo gallery)
4. "No Good Advice" (behind the scenes footage) – 2:00

The Singles Boxset (CD2)

1. "No Good Advice" – 3:48
2. "On a Round" – 2:45
3. "No Good Advice" (Dreadzone vocal mix) – 6:53
4. "No Good Advice" (Doublefunk dub mix) – 6:34
5. "No Good Advice" (Dreadzone dub mix) – 6:57
6. "No Good Advice" (parental advisory version) – 3:48
7. "No Good Advice" (Flip & Fill Remix) – 6:27
8. "No Good Advice" (behind the scenes footage) – 2:00
9. "Sound of the Underground" (video) – 3:46
10. "No Good Advice" (photo gallery)

20th Anniversary Digital EP

1. "No Good Advice" – 3:48
2. "On a Round" – 2:45
3. "No Good Advice" (Demo) – 3:52
4. "No Good Advice" (Dreadzone vocal mix) – 6:54
5. "No Good Advice" (Doublefunk vocal mix) – 7:28
6. "No Good Advice" (Flip & Fill remix) – 6:27
7. "No Good Advice" (parental advisory version) – 3:46
8. "No Good Advice" (Doublefunk dub mix) – 6:31
9. "No Good Advice" (Dreadzone dub mix) – 6:54

== Personnel ==
- Nadine Coyle – co-lead vocals
- Cheryl Tweedy – co-lead vocals
- Sarah Harding – co-lead vocals
- Nicola Roberts – co-lead vocals
- Kimberley Walsh – co-lead vocals

== Charts ==
=== Weekly charts ===
Chart (2003)	Peak position
Australia (ARIA)	88
Belgium (Ultratop 50 Flanders)	45
Europe (Eurochart Hot 100)	7
Ireland (IRMA)	2
Netherlands (Dutch Top 40)	26
Netherlands (Single Top 100)	23
Poland Airplay (Polish Airplay Charts)	9
Romania (Romanian Top 100)	97
Scottish Singles Sales (Official Charts)	2
UK Singles (Official Charts)	2
UK Airplay (Music Week)	13

=== Year-end charts ===
Chart (2003)	Position
Ireland (IRMA)	30
UK Singles (OCC)	56

== Certifications ==
Region	Certification	Certified units/sales
United Kingdom (BPI)	Silver	200,000^{‡}
^{‡} Sales+streaming figures based on certification alone.

== Cover versions ==
- British girl group Cleopatra performed the song on the ITV show Hit Me, Baby, One More Time in 2005.
