= Sound of the Underground (song) =

2002 single by Girls Aloud

Single by Girls Aloud

from the album Sound of the Underground
- B-side: "Stay Another Day"
- Released: 16 December 2002
- Recorded: November 2002
- Genre: Pop; drum and bass; surf rock; electro-rock
- Length: 3:41
- Label: Polydor
- Songwriters: Miranda Cooper; Niara Scarlett; Brian Higgins
- Producers: Brian Higgins; Xenomania

Girls Aloud singles chronology
"Sound of the Underground" (2002)	"No Good Advice" (2003)

Audio sample
- file; help

Music video
- "Sound of the Underground" on YouTube

"Sound of the Underground" is a song by British-Irish pop group Girls Aloud, later included on their debut album, Sound of the Underground. The song was written by Miranda Cooper, Brian Higgins and Niara Scarlett, and produced by Higgins and his production team Xenomania. Following Girls Aloud's formation on the ITV1 reality television show Popstars: The Rivals, "Sound of the Underground" was released as the group's debut single 16 days later, on 16 December 2002. Commercially, it was an immediate success; it became the year's Christmas number one in the UK, spending four consecutive weeks atop the chart. It also reached number one in Ireland and peaked within the top forty in Australia, Belgium, the Netherlands, Sweden and Switzerland.

The music video was recorded in an empty London warehouse days after Girls Aloud were formed. The song has been performed by Girls Aloud in a number of live appearances including Popstars: The Rivals and each of Girls Aloud's concert tours. Critically appreciated for its juxtaposition of surf guitar against electronic beats, "Sound of the Underground" was praised for its quality for both a girl group and a reality television act. The song was referred to as a defining moment of the decade musically, credited with reshaping British pop for the 2000s.

== Background and composition ==
"Sound of the Underground" was written by Brian Higgins, Niara Scarlett and Miranda Cooper. In an interview with The Daily Telegraph's Alice Vincent, Cooper explained that she was into drum and bass at the time and had been inspired by Josh Abrahams and Amiel Daemion's 1998 single "Addicted to Bass", as well as the popular nursery rhyme "The Wheels on the Bus". The song has been described as "a mechanistic sashay of twangy surf guitar and sultry gang vocals – Girls Aloud explodes like a five-headed Kylie Minogue." The song is written in E minor (recorded in E-flat minor) with a time signature in common time and a tempo of 163 beats per minute. The vocal range spans from G_{3} to C♯_{5}. Following typical verse-chorus form, the song consists of a verse followed by a bridge and chorus. The second half of the bridge is also employed as a middle 8.

"Sound of the Underground" was one of sixty songs that Higgins and Cooper had written with the aim of launching their own girl group. The song was originally recorded in 2001 by Orchid, a London girl group that included singer and actress Louise Griffiths and who disbanded before gaining a firm record deal. Irish artist Samantha Mumba was due to record this as her comeback song in 2002 but she opted for "I'm Right Here" instead. It was chosen by Girls Aloud's manager Louis Walsh as their debut single. The finalists of the ITV1 programme Popstars: The Rivals recorded and rehearsed the song a week before the finals.

In the liner essay for the 20th anniversary re-release of the group's debut album, Sound of the Underground, Kimberley Walsh wrote, "I was just glad [the song] wasn't an insipid ballad or something really cheesy – it was definitely a song with a cooler vibe." Nicola Roberts admitted that she was initially anxious about the drum and bass sound of the track, which made it stand out from other chart hits of that era: "We didn't have drum and bass up north at the time; we just had commercial radio ... So I was just very aware that Sound of the Underground sounded different from the pop groups that came before us: Atomic Kitten, Spice Girls, Hear'Say."

== Release ==
Girls Aloud were formed through the show by a public vote on 30 November 2002. The concept of the programme was to produce a boyband and a girlband who would be "rivals" and compete for the Christmas number one single in 2002. Girls Aloud competed against One True Voice, managed by music producer Pete Waterman. Both groups were sent on huge promotional tour. They used a combative "Buy girls, bye boys" slogan to persuade the public to buy their single. A cover of One True Voice's single "Sacred Trust" appears on the special edition bonus disc of Girls Aloud's greatest hits album The Sound of Girls Aloud, alongside an extended performance version of "Sound of the Underground" which includes an instrumental breakdown.

The single was released on two different CD single formats and on cassette. The first CD included a cover of East 17's "Stay Another Day" and Brian Higgins' remix of "Sound of the Underground", while the second CD included the instrumental of "Stay Another Day" and an interview with the girls. In some countries, a Flip & Fill remix of the single was featured.

=== Controversy ===
Pete Waterman caused a media frenzy after accusing Girls Aloud of being unoriginal and not singing on "Sound of the Underground" (after they claimed it was better to release a new song than a cover as the A-side). Many articles falsely claim that this track was then "stolen" from Orchid by Girls Aloud. The track was actually owned by Xenomania (the producers) and the original version was used as a "session singers" version, making it Girls Aloud's and not a cover as some articles suggested. Due to the press attention, the members of Orchid are credited on the single release and remain backing singers on the single. Sarah Harding explained that this just pads out the track and is not uncommon in the industry.

== Reception ==
=== Critical response ===
"Sound of the Underground" received a positive response from most music critics. It "proved a first: it was a reality pop record that didn't make you want to do physical harm to everyone involved in its manufacture." A review for Girls Aloud's debut album stated that the song has "become a pulsating pop classic with a modern, metallic beat, catchy chorus and just the right amount of sleaze." The song was further described as "an enticing blend of spiky guitars and Fatboy Slim beats topped off with an irresistibly catchy chorus." Michael Osborn said that "Sound of the Underground" offers "a fresh tune that has no intentions of following the road to seasonal schmaltzville". An article in The Guardian called the song "an icy confection very different from the normal run of girl-band things" and Martin James in his book State of Bass: The Origins of Jungle/Drum & Bass stated that "Sound of the Underground may well be the first jungle single to top the charts."

"Sound of the Underground" and another Xenomania production, Sugababes' "Round Round", have been called "two huge groundbreaking hits", credited with reshaping British pop music for the 2000s. Peter Robinson wrote, "Instead of what would become the predictable 'victory lap' ballad, here was an upbeat attitude-soaked celebration of life, partying, and being young." In 2003, "Sound of the Underground" was voted Best Single at the Disney Channel Kids Awards. The Telegraph placed the song at number 15 on a list of 100 songs that defined the 2000s, while NME included it at number 39. Spinner.com named "Sound of the Underground" the eighth-best British song of the 2000s.

=== Chart performance ===
"Sound of the Underground" debuted at number one on the UK singles chart on 22 December 2002. Girls Aloud sold just over 213,000 copies, while One True Voice's "Sacred Trust" sold only 147,000. Girls Aloud stayed at number one for a second and third week, the final chart of 2002 and the first chart of 2003. The single spent another week at number one, bringing "Sound of the Underground" to a total of four consecutive weeks at number one in the UK. It spent two weeks in the top five at numbers three and five respectively, before slipping to number nine. The single spent fourteen further weeks inside the UK's top 75. It was certified platinum by the British Phonographic Industry in March 2003 for shipments of over 600,000 and sold over 653,000 copies. In December 2015, the Official Charts Company stated that "Sound of the Underground" had a chart sales tally of 679,770. In August 2017, the Official Charts Company updated the single's total sales figures to approximately 715,000. Following Sarah Harding's death in September 2021, the song had a resurgence in popularity with sales rising over 125%.

The song had similar success on the Irish Singles Chart. "Sound of the Underground" debuted at number two behind Eminem's "Lose Yourself", while One True Voice only managed to chart at number nine. They held on at number two for a second and a third week. In the song's fourth week on the Irish chart, "Sound of the Underground" managed to rise to number one, finally dethroning Eminem. It spent two weeks at the pole position. The song peaked inside the top twenty on Belgium's Ultratop Flanders chart and the Netherlands' Single Top 100 chart. The song also charted in Australia and various European countries.

== Music video ==
The video for "Sound of the Underground" was shot in an empty London warehouse, the Dimco Buildings, on 2 December 2002, just days after Girls Aloud's formation in the last week of competition of Popstars: The Rivals. It was directed by Phil Griffin, who would later direct the videos for "No Good Advice" and "Life Got Cold".

It features the band members in various scenes "underground", wearing black or pink tops, and a miniskirt or trousers in the opposite colour, teamed with high-heeled shoes or knee-high boots. In the group scene, they perform the song backed by a band in a large metal enclosure. As the song progresses, each band member also incorporates a tall microphone stand into the choreography, echoed in many live performances of the song. In the solo scenes, each member is shown sitting or standing in the "underground" setting while various other shots, such as a light bulb spontaneously cracking open and catching on fire, are shown.

The music video is available on the "No Good Advice" DVD single, Girls on Film, Style and 2012's Ten: The Videos.

Girls Aloud released a new 4K version of the music video on 28 April 2023.

== Live performances ==
Girls Aloud performed "Sound of the Underground" live for the first time on Popstars: The Rivals on 7 December 2002, wearing coordinating pink-and-black outfits as seen on the single's music video. Small puffs of smoke were sent up into the air each time the song reached its chorus. In order to promote the single, the group performed the single at various locations across the country, including a signing at an HMV store in Manchester's Trafford Centre. They also made many television appearances, performing on programmes such as CD:UK, GMTV, Popworld, RI:SE, Richard and Judy, Smile, This Morning, Top of the Pops Saturday, and UK Top 40: CBBC Viewers' Vote. They performed on Popstars again on 22 December, just moments after finding out their single was the Christmas number one. The group wore all-white outfits during a performance that included lights and smoke as well as ad-libs referencing the number one. They also sang "Sound of the Underground" on the Top of the Pops Christmas special, which airs annually on Christmas Day.

The song was performed on shows like Tops of the Pops and The Saturday Show during 2003. It was also performed at a number of live events in 2003, such as Ireland's ChildLine Concert, Spring Break, Pepsi Silver Clef, Party in the Park, Live & Loud, and the West Belfast Festival. Girls Aloud began to promote the song's release across continental Europe, which involved appearances at Belgium's TMF Awards and on Germany's VIVA Interaktiv and the German version of Top of the Pops. In the United Kingdom, Girls Aloud performed "Sound of the Underground" at the 2003 Disney Channel Kids Awards (where it was named Best Single), the Children in Need telethon, and once again at 2003's Top of the Pops Christmas special. Girls Aloud returned to Ireland's ChildLine in 2004. It was also performed for the group's MTV special, as seen on their DVD Girls on Film.

Since its release, "Sound of the Underground" has been included in each of Girls Aloud's tours. The track was included as the encore of their 2005 tour What Will the Neighbours Say...? Tour. The performance included a dance break and ended with an explosion of pyrotechnics. For 2006's Chemistry Tour, the song was accompanied by new choreography involving chairs, while 2007's The Greatest Hits Tour saw the group in black-and-white variations on a suit. The song was slightly remixed for 2008's Tangled Up Tour, during which Girls Aloud performed it in the first section alongside male dancers. "Sound of the Underground" was also included on 2009's Out of Control Tour; flames burst out of the stage as the group sang and danced. The song was again included on the band's 2013 reunion tour; it was performed as the opening song as the band came down onto the stage on a huge sign reading the band's name. During 2024's The Girls Aloud Show, the track was performed as the second song of the second act with pyrotechnics and scenes from the music video projected on the screens.

The single has also been performed at Girls Aloud's appearances at V Festival in 2006 and 2008, as well as their two nights supporting Coldplay at Wembley Stadium. It was showcased during Girls Aloud's 2007 appearance on The Album Chart Show, where they performed songs from their greatest hits album. They also performed it on their one-off variety show The Girls Aloud Party. The group was accompanied by Kaiser Chiefs, who led into "Sound of the Underground" with their own track "Never Miss a Beat".

== 20th anniversary ==
In March 2023, it was reported that the band were to share unreleased tracks from the archives, to celebrate the 20th anniversary of their debut album, Sound of the Underground. On 28 April 2023, Girls Aloud released the promotional single "Sound Of The Underground (Alternative Vocal Mix)".

== Track listings and formats ==
These are the formats and track listings of major single releases of "Sound of the Underground".

UK CD1 / Australia / New Zealand (Polydor / 0658272)

1. "Sound of the Underground" – 3:41
2. "Stay Another Day" (Tony Mortimer, Rob Kean, Dominic Hawken) – 4:24
3. "Sound of the Underground" (Brian Higgins Remix) – 4:40

UK CD2 (Polydor / 0658202)

1. "Sound of the Underground" – 3:41
2. "Stay Another Day" (Instrumental) – 4:24
3. "Girls Aloud Interview" – 7:13

UK Cassette (Polydor / 0658274)

1. "Sound of the Underground" – 3:41
2. "Stay Another Day" – 4:24

Germany (Polydor / 0654325)

1. "Sound of the Underground" – 3:41
2. "Stay Another Day" – 4:24
3. "Sound of the Underground" (Brian Higgins Remix) – 4:40
4. "Sound of the Underground" (Flip & Fill Remix) – 5:36
5. "Girls Aloud Interview" – 7:13

The Singles Boxset (CD1)

1. "Sound of the Underground" – 3:41
2. "Stay Another Day" – 4:24
3. "Sound of the Underground" (Brian Higgins Remix) – 4:40
4. "Stay Another Day" (Instrumental) – 4:24
5. "Girls Aloud Interview" – 7:13
6. "Sound of the Underground" (Flip & Fill Remix) – 5:36
7. "Sound of the Underground" (Instrumental Breakdown Mix) – 3:36

2023 20th Anniversary Digital EP

1. "Sound of the Underground" – 3:41
2. "Sound of the Underground (Alternative Vocal Mix)" – 3:39
3. "Stay Another Day" – 4:20
4. "Sound of the Underground" (Brian Higgins Remix) – 4:37
5. "Stay Another Day" (Instrumental) – 4:20
6. "Exclusive Interview with Girls Aloud" – 7:12
7. "Sound of the Underground" (Flip & Fill Remix) – 5:33
8. "Sound of the Underground" (Instrumental Breakdown Mix) – 3:36

== Credits and personnel ==
- Guitars: Shawn Lee, Nick Cracknell
- Mastering: Dick Beetham for 360 Mastering
- Mixing and additional production: Jeremy Wheatley for 365 Artists
- Production: Brian Higgins, Xenomania
- Programming and keyboards: Nick Coler, Matt Gray, Tim "Rolf" Larcombe, Tim Powell
- Songwriting: Miranda Cooper, Brian Higgins, Niara Scarlett
- Vocals: Girls Aloud
- Published by Warner/Chappell Music and Xenomania Music
- Special thanks to Eve Bicker, Giselle Sommerville, and Louise Griffiths

== Charts ==
=== Weekly charts ===
Chart (2002–2003)	Peak position
Australia (ARIA)	31
Belgium (Ultratop 50 Flanders)	13
Belgium (Ultratop 50 Wallonia)	35
Europe (Eurochart Hot 100)	2
France (SNEP)	55
Germany (GfK)	42
Ireland (IRMA)	1
Netherlands (Dutch Top 40)	9
Netherlands (Single Top 100)	10
Poland Airplay (Polish Airplay Charts)	4
Romania (Romanian Top 100)	10
Scottish Singles Sales (Official Charts)	1
Sweden (Sverigetopplistan)	39
Switzerland (Schweizer Hitparade)	25
UK Singles (Official Charts)	1
UK Airplay (Music Week)	3

Chart (2022)	Peak position
UK Physical Singles Chart (OCC)	1
UK Vinyl Singles Chart (OCC)	1

=== Year-end charts ===
Chart (2002)	Position
Ireland (IRMA)	42
UK Singles (OCC)	17

Chart (2003)	Position
Belgium (Ultratop 50 Flanders)	65
Ireland (IRMA)	10
Netherlands (Dutch Top 40)	66
Netherlands (Single Top 100)	96
Romania (Romanian Top 100)	49
UK Singles (OCC)	21

=== Decade-end charts ===
Chart (2000–2009)	Position
UK Singles (OCC)	40

=== All-time charts ===
Chart	Position
UK Singles (OCC)	47

== Certifications ==
Region	Certification	Certified units/sales
United Kingdom (BPI)	2× Platinum	1,200,000^{‡}
^{‡} Sales+streaming figures based on certification alone.

== Release history ==
Region	Date	Format(s)	Label(s)	Ref.
United Kingdom	16 December 2002	CD; cassette	Polydor	
Australia	10 March 2003	CD	Polydor	
United Kingdom	9 December 2022	7-inch vinyl; digital download; streaming	Polydor	
