= Keavy Lynch =

Irish singer (born 1979)

- Lynch in 1998

Background information
- Born: Keavy-Jane Elizabeth Annie Lynch; 15 December 1979 (age 46); Dublin, Ireland
- Genre: Pop
- Occupations: Singer, songwriter
- Years active: 1997–present
- Member of: B*Witched
- Formerly of: Barbarellas
- Spouse: Nathaniel Comer (m. 2017; div. 2023)

Keavy-Jane Elizabeth Annie Lynch (born 15 December 1979) is an Irish pop singer. She is best known for being a member of the girl group B*Witched, of which her twin sister Edele is also a member.

== Early life and education ==
Lynch and her twin sister Edele were born to homemaker Noeleen and mechanic Brendan Lynch and raised in Donaghmede, North-east Dublin. She is one of six children. Her brother, Shane, is a member of the boy band Boyzone, sister Tara was in the girl group Fab!, and sister Naomi was in the group Buffalo G. Before B*Witched, Lynch worked as a part-time trainee car mechanic at her father's garage.

In an interview, Edele Lynch talked about her bond with her twin: "She's the greatest gift I've ever been given, and I think a lot of identical twins would say that. She really is my other half, and I'm not the same without her. We've worked together most of our lives and when we looked back on when B*Witched split and we went our separate ways for the first time, that was like our first day at school. I missed her."

== Music career ==
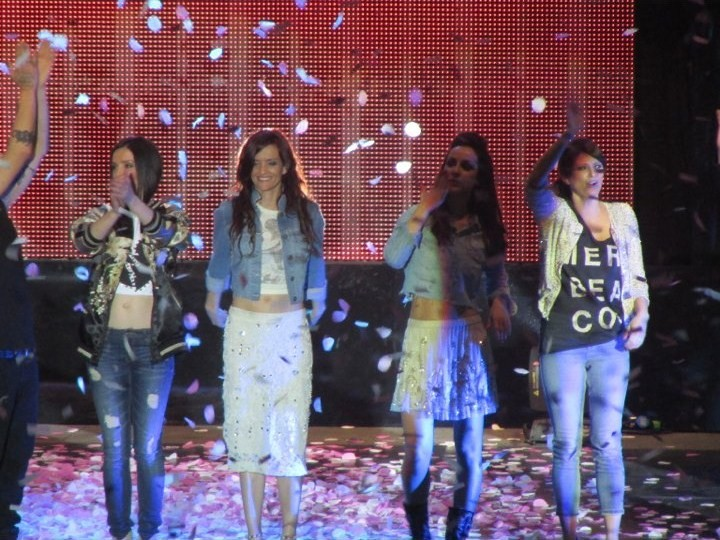
Lynch (second from left) with B*Witched in 2013

In 1997, Keavy and Edele formed the girl group Butterfly Farm with their friend Sinéad O'Carroll. They began writing and recording together, but soon realised that there was "someone missing". Upon Keavy's suggestion, they asked Lindsay Armaou to audition and she played a tape recording of a song she had written. The other girls liked it and Armaou became the fourth member of the band, who later changed their name to B*Witched.

After B*Witched split in 2002, Lynch remained somewhat active in the music industry, forming Ziiiing!, a production and songwriting company, with musical partner Alex Toms. In 2011, she and Edele formed a new group, Barbarellas. She is also a party and function singer with The Collection/The Monaco Band.

In 2012, B*Witched, 911, Five, Atomic Kitten, Honeyz and Liberty X reunited for the ITV2 reality-documentary series The Big Reunion.

== Other work ==
Lynch took the lead role in a pantomime performance of Snow White in December 2005 at the Theatre Royal in Nottingham. She returned to the stage in 2015, appearing as a forest sprite in Robin Hood and the Babes in the Wood at Woodville Halls Theatre, Gravesend.

In 2014, Lynch completed a degree, BSc Reflective Therapeutic Practice, to become a qualified humanistic counsellor. Her practice is located in Kingston upon Thames. Lynch is patron of a mental health charity, Stand Down, which offers counselling to those who suffer mental trauma as a result of military service. She said "I am very excited and feel honoured to be a patron for Stand Down. I think it is a service that is very much needed and a service that these men and women deserve. I may not agree with war but these men and woman are risking their lives everyday fighting for the country I live in and I am grateful for that."

== Personal life ==
In 2007, Lynch admitted that when B*Witched split up after the group was dropped by their record company Sony Music, she suffered from depression and contemplated suicide. In 2011, she said "I don't suffer from depression now. It was that one time, but it lasted for way too many years. I should have got help." In May 2017, Lynch married her partner of two years, Nathaniel Comer. The couple have three children together. As of 2023, she is legally divorced and has been separated for three years.
