= Edele Lynch =

Irish singer

- Lynch in 1998

Background information
- Born: Edele Claire Christina Edwina Lynch; 15 December 1979 (age 46); Dublin, Ireland
- Genre: Pop
- Occupations: Singer; songwriter; television personality
- Years active: 1997–present
- Member of: B*Witched
- Formerly of: Barbarellas

Edele Claire Christina Edwina Lynch (born 15 December 1979) is an Irish pop singer. She is the lead singer of the girl group B*Witched, of which her twin sister Keavy is also a member. In 2013, Lynch won Celebrity Apprentice Ireland, and the following year she appeared in the fourteenth series of Celebrity Big Brother.

== Early life ==
Edele and her twin sister, Keavy, were born to Brendan and Noeleen Lynch, a mechanic and housewife respectively, and raised in Donaghmede, North-east Dublin. Edele is one of six children.

Her brother Shane is a member of the boy band Boyzone, sister Tara was in the girl group Fab!, and sister Naomi in the group Buffalo G.

== Career ==
=== B*Witched and Barbarellas ===
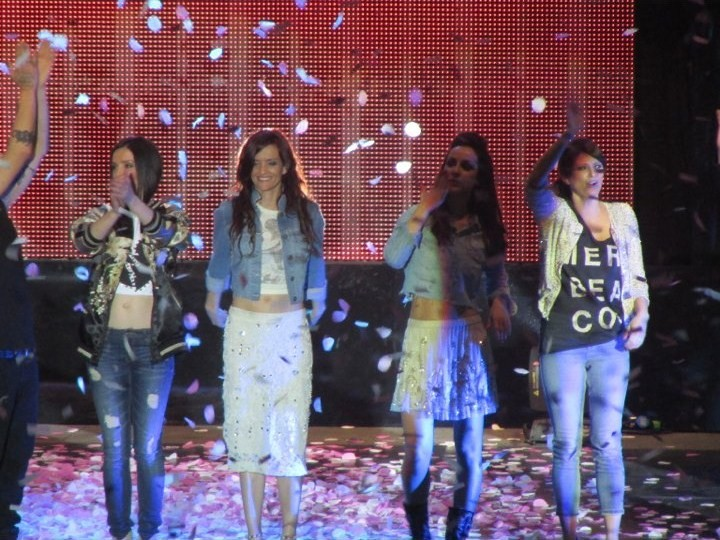
Lynch (left) with B*Witched in 2013

In 1997, Edele and her twin sister Keavy formed the girl group Butterfly Farm with their friend Sinéad O'Carroll. The trio began writing and recording together but soon realised that there was "someone missing". Upon Keavy's suggestion, they asked Lindsay Armaou to come for an audition and she played a tape recording of a song she had written. The other girls liked it, and Lindsay became the fourth member of the group, who later changed their name to B*Witched.

After the split, Edele joined the songwriting/production team Xenomania. She co-wrote "Some Kind of Miracle" for Girls Aloud's debut album, Sound of the Underground, and "Buster", "Situation's Heavy" and "Twisted" for the Sugababes' third album, Three. In 2006, Edele and Keavy created a duo group going by the name of Ms Lynch, until December 2009 when they were officially rebranded as Barbarellas. Edele confirmed on Facebook in late 2012 that the Barbarellas project had come to an end before reuniting with B*Witched.

=== Celebrity Apprentice and Celebrity Big Brother ===
On 28 October 2013, Edele won Celebrity Apprentice Ireland, beating journalist Amanda Brunker in the final and winning €25,000 for her chosen charity, Laura Lynn House.

On 18 August 2014, Edele became the ninth housemate to enter the Celebrity Big Brother house, eventually finishing in 6th place.

== Personal life ==
Lynch has a daughter, Ceol, who is racing in the JSCC in the UK.
