= Popjustice £20 Music Prize =

British music award

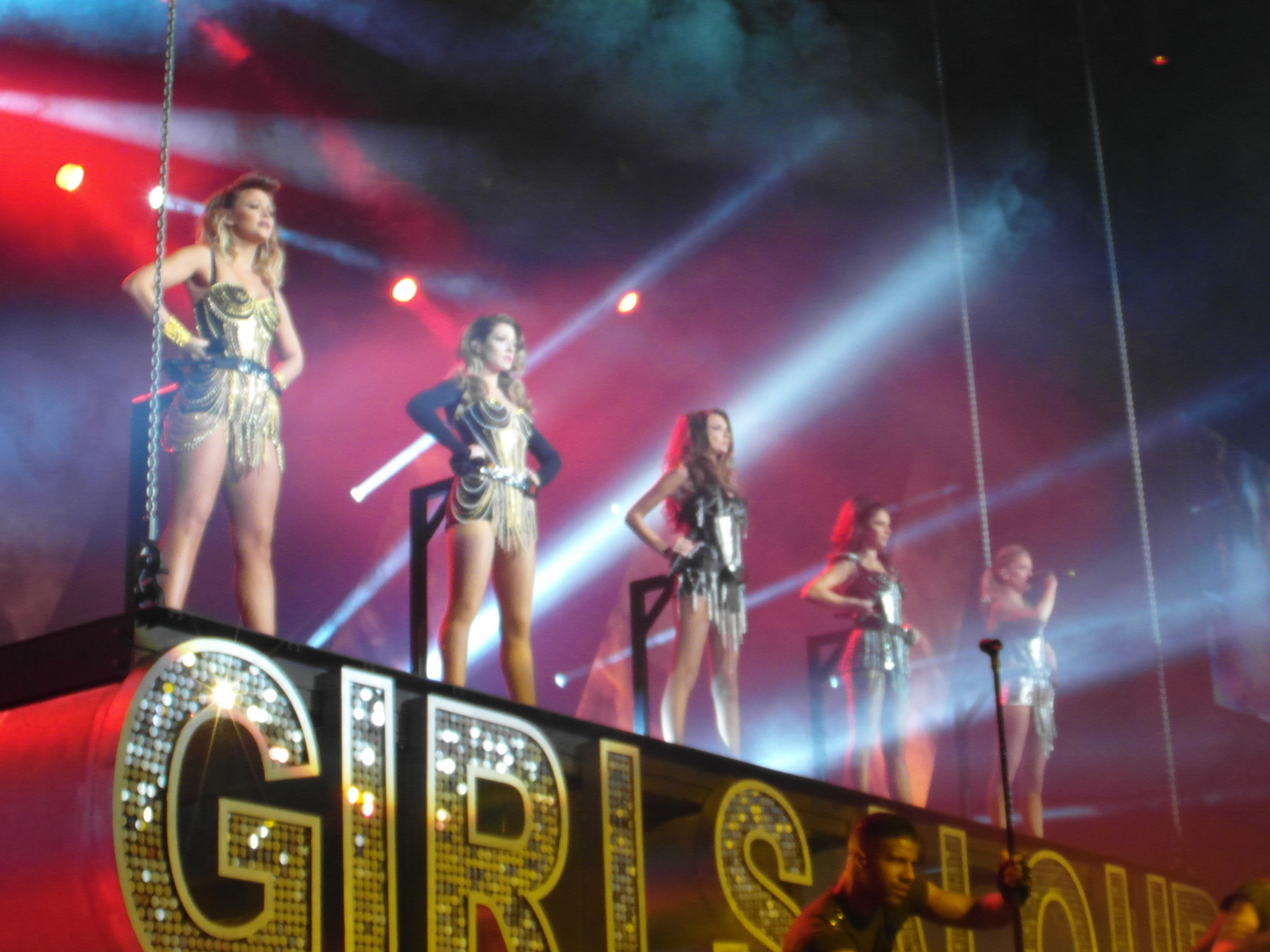
Girls Aloud (pictured in 2013) have won the award five times, more than any other act.

The Popjustice £20 Music Prize, also known as the Popjustice Twenty Quid Prize, is an annual prize awarded by music website Popjustice to recognise the best British pop single of the previous year. The prize was conceived by Popjustice founder Peter Robinson in 2003 as a reaction to what he perceived as the pompous and elitist nature of the existing Mercury Prize, which recognises the best album of the previous year, and in particular its exclusion of pop music acts in favour of those from more esoteric genres. The shortlist for the Popjustice prize is announced in September of each year and the winner named the following month, to coincide with the presentation of the Mercury Prize. Popjustice gives a token prize of £20 to the winner of its award, in contrast to the £20,000 given to the winner of the Mercury Prize.

The winning entry is chosen by a panel of Popjustice readers, who apply for the position via the website. The judges meet in a pub to debate the merits of the songs shortlisted by Robinson and eliminate them, often based on bizarre or arbitrary criteria, until a winner is chosen. In 2009 Nicola Roberts of Girls Aloud attended the pub in person to collect the prize of a £20 note in a plastic container.

The first prize was awarded to Girls Aloud in 2003 for their single "No Good Advice", and the act went on to win the award four more times over the next six years; no other act had won more than once until Little Mix's second win in 2015 with "Black Magic", the eighth time the award had been won by a British girl group. Girls Aloud and Little Mix have received the most nominations, with eight apiece. The next highest number of nominations for an act is six for Dua Lipa, Charli XCX and Jade.

== Recipients ==
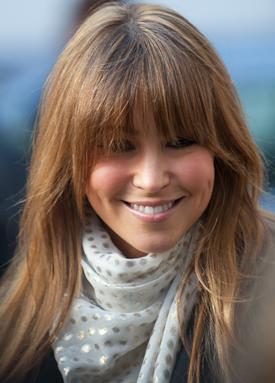
Rachel Stevens has been nominated for the award four times as a solo artist and was also a member of the group S Club, who were nominated in 2003.

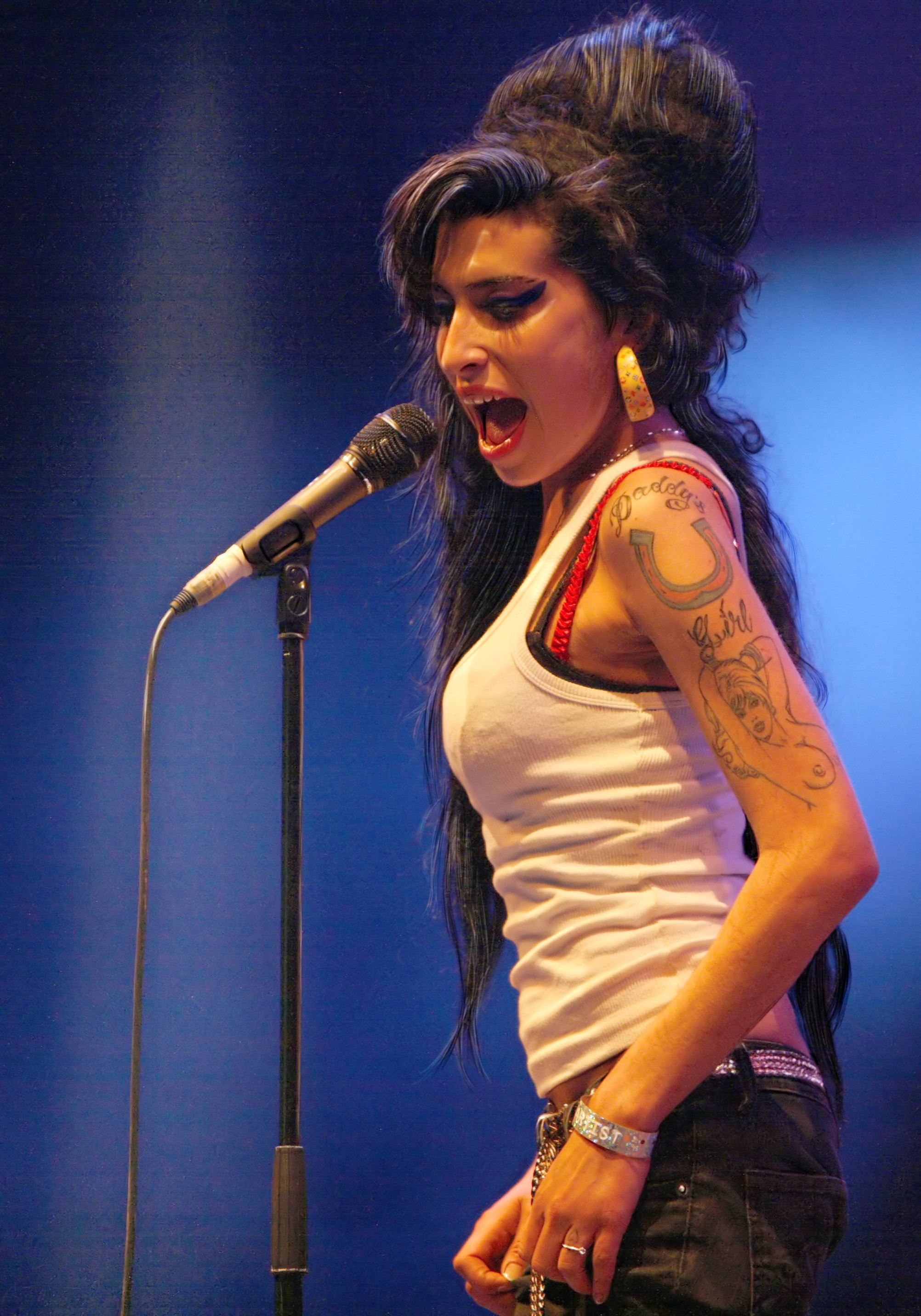
Amy Winehouse received the award in 2007 and was nominated the next year in 2008.

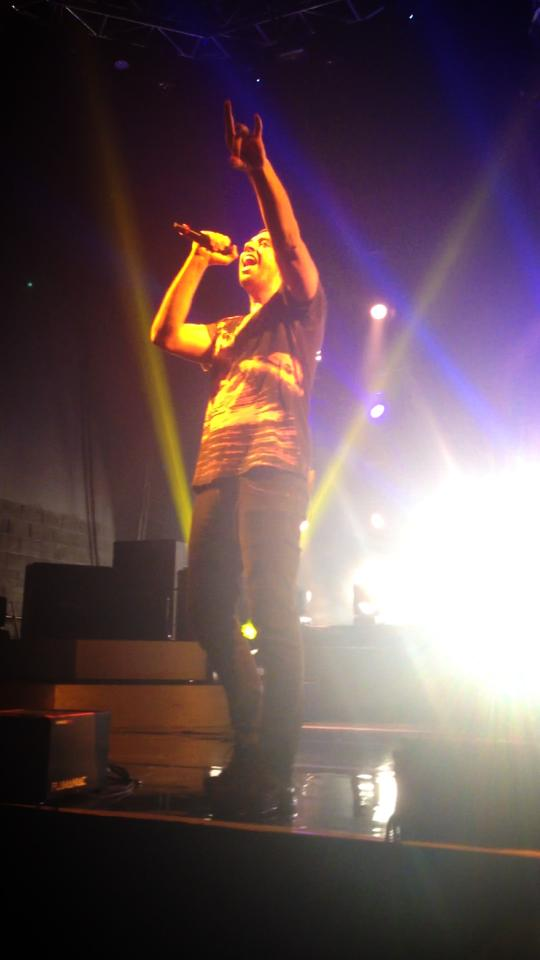
Rapper Example was the first male winner of the award. Prior to his win in 2010, Girls Aloud had received the award five times and female soloists had won twice.

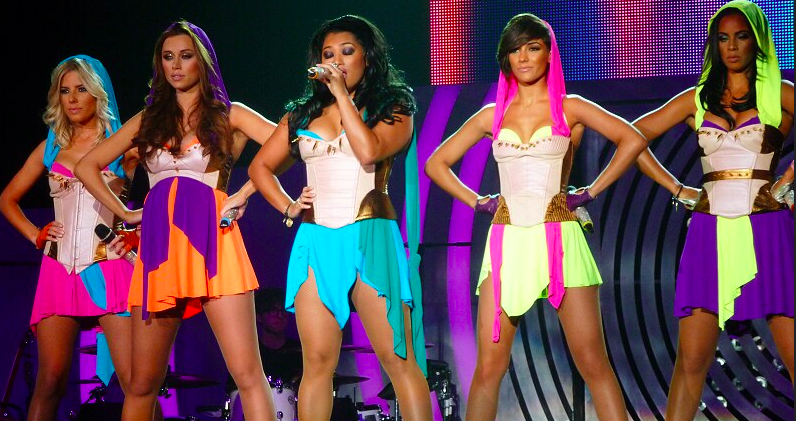
Girl group the Saturdays has won the award once out of four nominations in 2011.

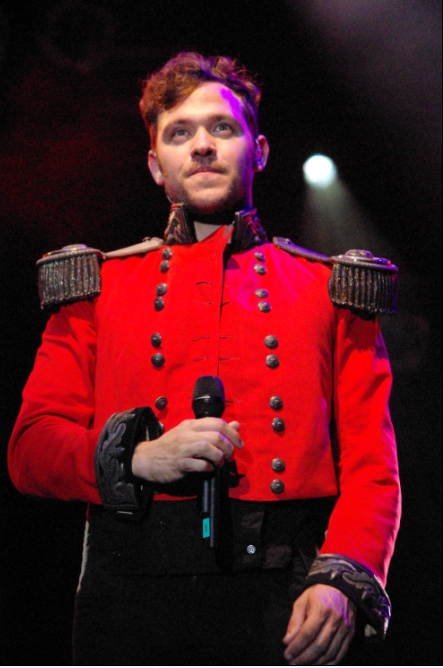
Will Young became the second male winner of the award when he received it in 2012 in his third nomination.

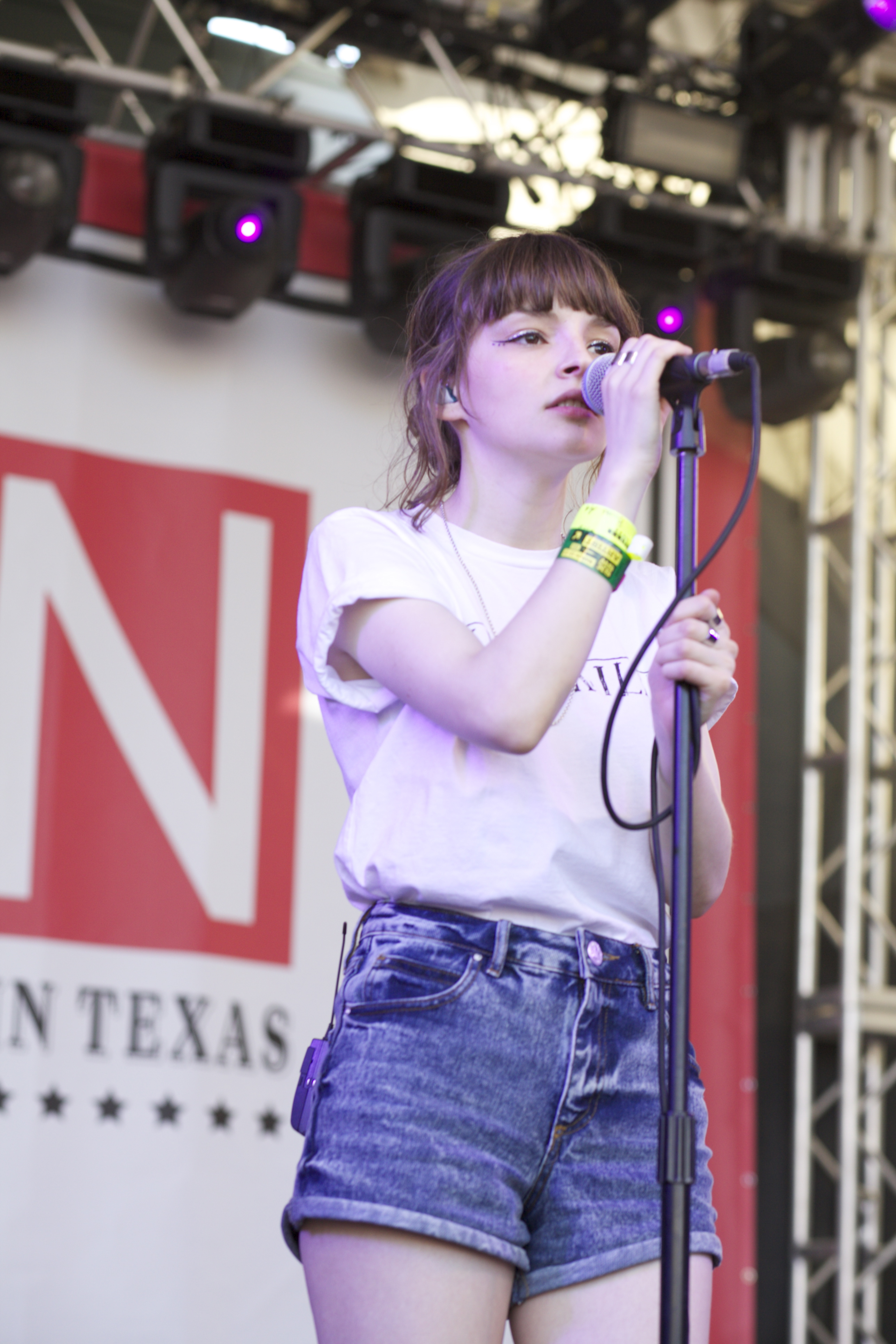
Lauren Mayberry, lead vocalist of 2013 winners Chvrches

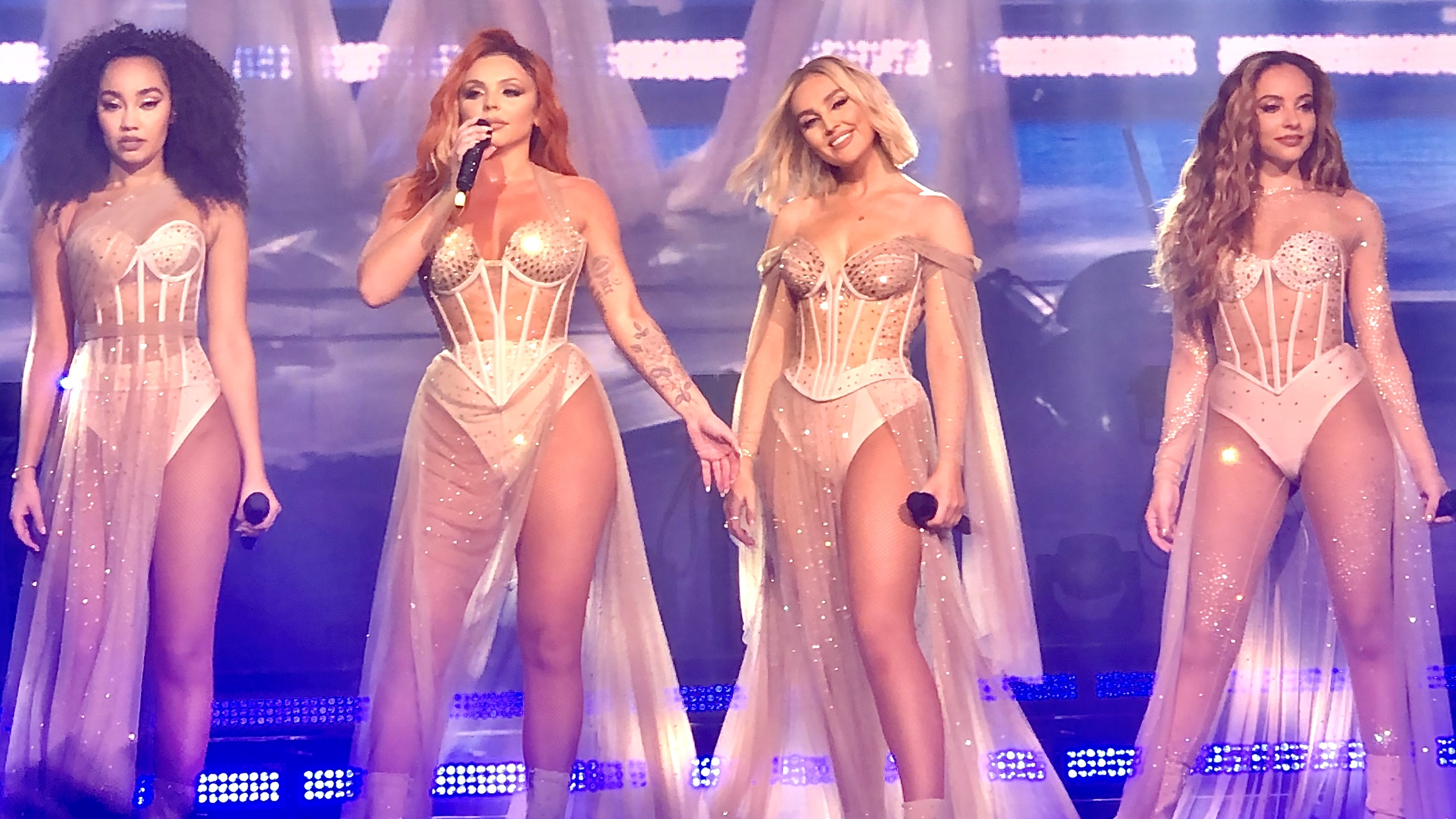
Little Mix have won the award on three occasions and share the record of most nominations overall with Girls Aloud with eight nominations.

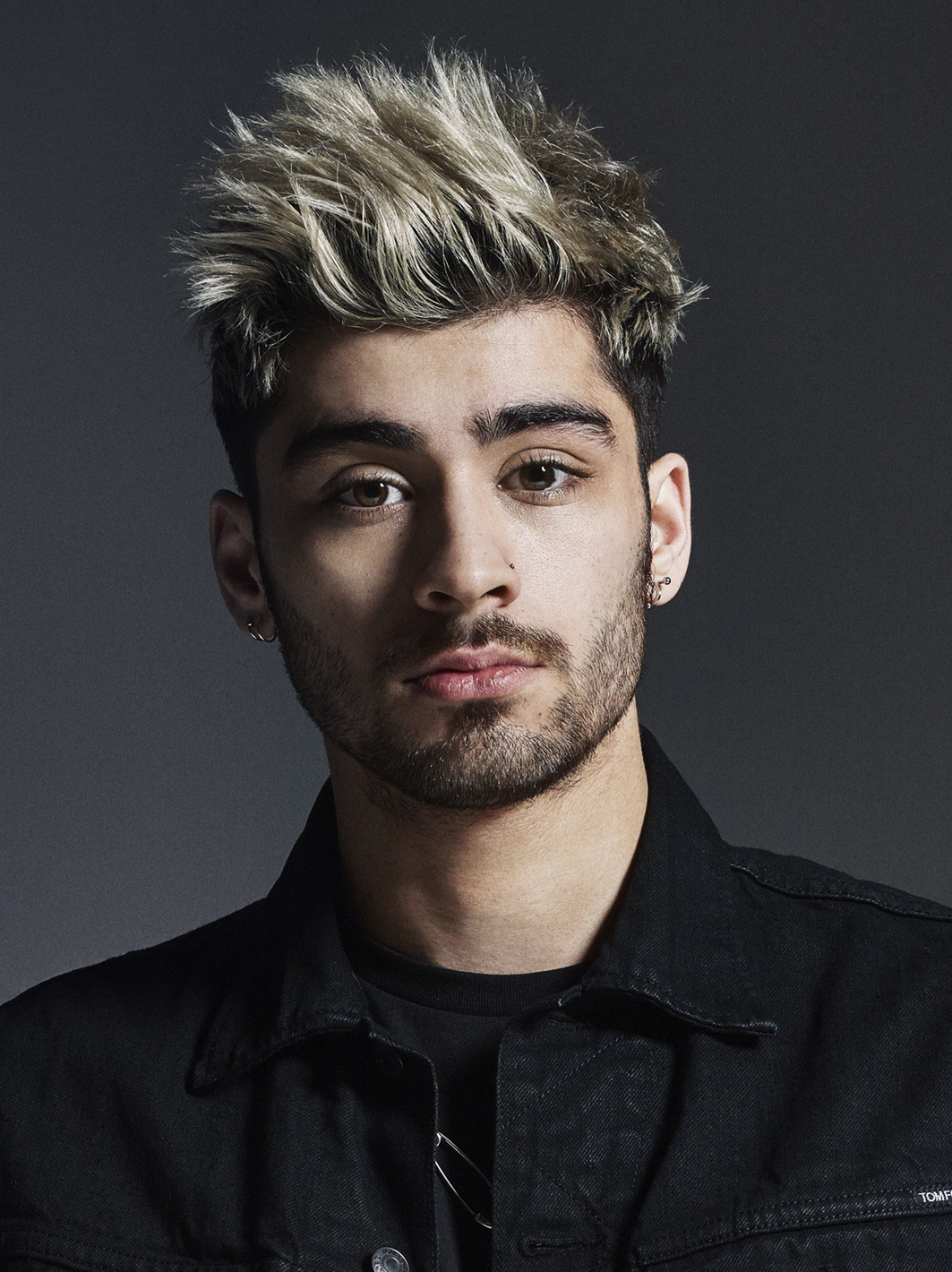
Former One Direction member Zayn won on his first solo nomination in 2016 after receiving three nominations as part of the group.

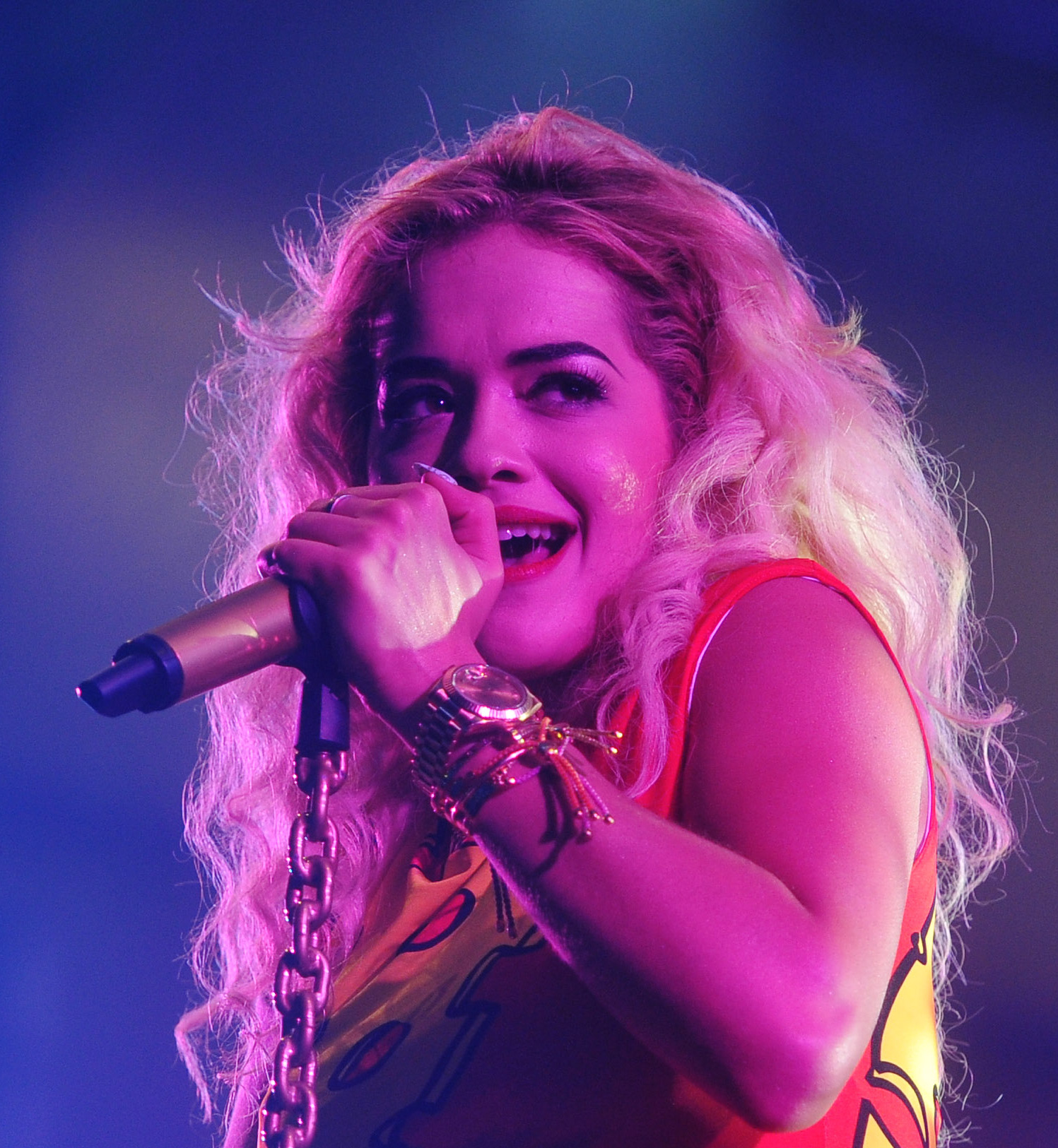
Rita Ora received the award in 2018.

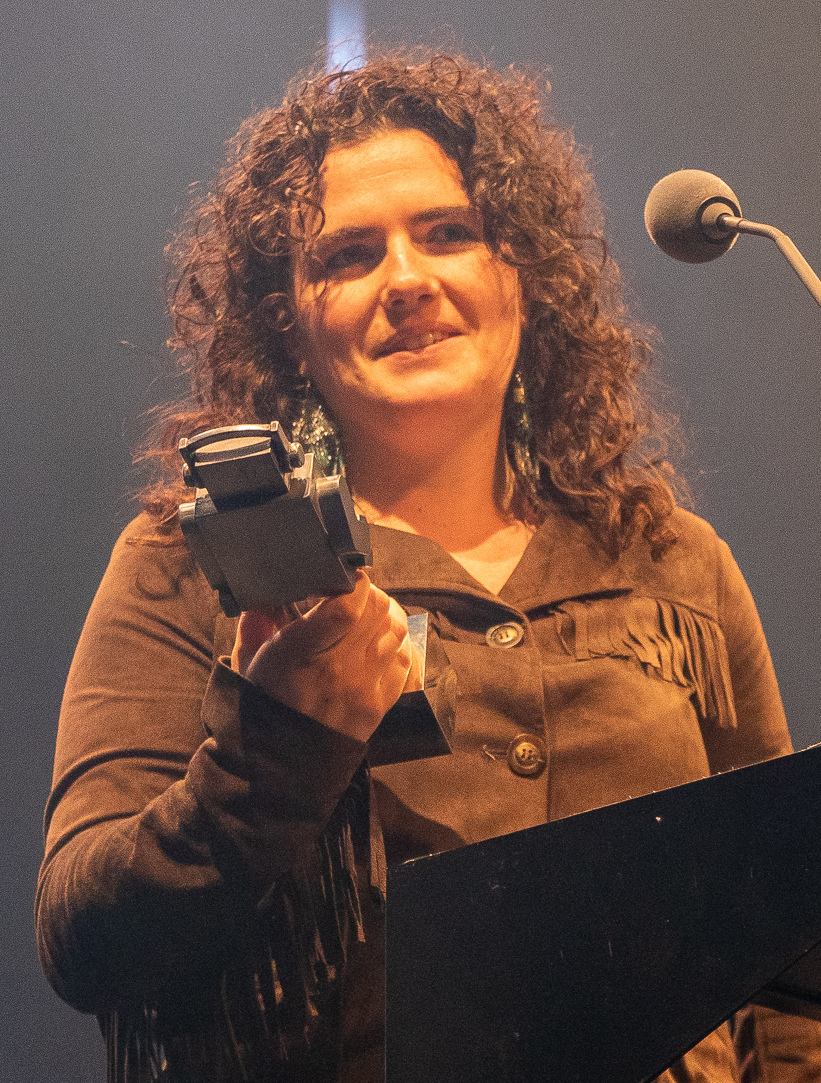
Georgia won the award in 2019.

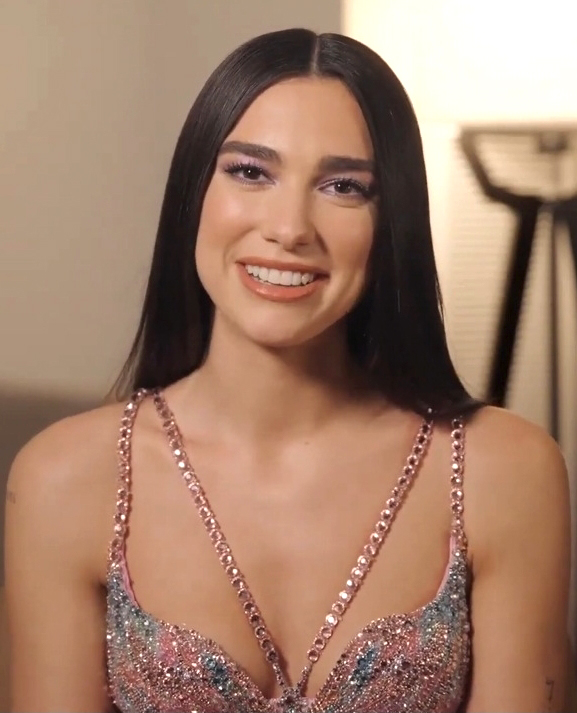
Dua Lipa received the award in 2020.

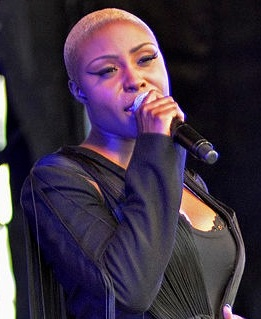
Laura Mvula received the award in 2021.

Winners of the Popjustice £20 Music Prize
Year	Song	Performing artist(s)	Nominees	Ref
2003	"No Good Advice"	Girls Aloud	"Being Nobody" – Richard X vs. Liberty X; "If You're Not the One" – Daniel Bedingfield; "Lately" – Lisa Scott-Lee; "Misfit" – Amy Studt; "New Direction" – S Club 8; "Round Round" – Sugababes; "Say Goodbye" – S Club; "Scandalous" – Mis-Teeq; "Seventeen" – Ladytron; "Stop Sign" – Abs; "What I Go to School For" – Busted	
2004	"Some Girls"	Rachel Stevens	"Crashed the Wedding" – Busted; "5 Colours in Her Hair" – McFly; "Hole in the Head" – Sugababes; "Leave Right Now" – Will Young; "Maybe" – Emma Bunton; "Never Felt Like This Before" – Shaznay Lewis; "The Show" – Girls Aloud; "Somewhere Only We Know" – Keane; "Superstar" – Jamelia; "Surrender" – Javine; "Sweet Dreams My LA Ex" – Rachel Stevens	
2005	"Wake Me Up"	Girls Aloud	"Crazy Chick" – Charlotte Church; "Don't Play Nice" – Verbalicious; "Dumb" – The 411; "Everyday I Love You Less and Less" – Kaiser Chiefs; "In My Arms" – Mylo; "Lola's Theme" – Shapeshifters; "Negotiate with Love" – Rachel Stevens; "Oh My Gosh" – Basement Jaxx; "Ooh La La" – Goldfrapp; "Out of Touch" – Uniting Nations; "Radio" – Robbie Williams	
2006	"Biology"	Girls Aloud	"Dare" – Gorillaz; "Destroy Everything You Touch" – Ladytron; "I Said Never Again (But Here We Are)" – Rachel Stevens; "Number 1" – Goldfrapp; "Over and Over" – Hot Chip; "Push the Button" – Sugababes; "Smile" – Lily Allen; "Supermassive Black Hole" – Muse; "Up All Night" – Matt Willis; "Valentine" – Delays; "Who Am I" – Will Young	
2007	"Rehab"	Amy Winehouse	"Acceptable in the 80s" – Calvin Harris; "Beware of the Dog" – Jamelia; "Catch You" – Sophie Ellis-Bextor; "Don't Give It Up" – Siobhán Donaghy; "Foundations" – Kate Nash; "Overpowered" – Róisín Murphy; "She's Madonna" – Robbie Williams; "Shine" – Booty Luv; "Something Kinda Ooooh" – Girls Aloud; "Stop Me" – Mark Ronson; "Yeah Yeah" – Bodyrox feat. Luciana	
2008	"Call the Shots"	Girls Aloud	"A&E" – Goldfrapp; "About You Now" – Sugababes; "Bleeding Love" – Leona Lewis; "Dance wiv Me" – Dizzee Rascal featuring Calvin Harris; "Flux" – Bloc Party; "Money" – Daggers; "Ready for the Floor" – Hot Chip; "Song 4 Mutya (Out of Control)" – Groove Armada featuring Mutya Buena; "Stuck on Repeat" – Little Boots; "That's Not My Name" – The Ting Tings; "Valerie" – Mark Ronson featuring Amy Winehouse	
2009	"The Promise"	Girls Aloud	"Beat Again" – JLS; "Better Off as Two" – Frankmusik; "The Boy Does Nothing" – Alesha Dixon; "The Fear" – Lily Allen; "I'm Not Alone" – Calvin Harris; "In For The Kill" – La Roux; "Love Etc." – Pet Shop Boys; "Method of Modern Love" – Saint Etienne; "New In Town" – Little Boots; "Take Me Back" – Tinchy Stryder featuring Taio Cruz; "Up" – The Saturdays	
2010	"Kickstarts"	Example	"Bad Boys" – Alexandra Burke featuring Flo Rida; "Bittersweet" – Sophie Ellis-Bextor; "I Am Not a Robot" – Marina and the Diamonds; "I Wish" – Mini Viva; "I Won't Kneel" – Groove Armada; "Left My Heart in Tokyo" – Mini Viva; "Never Leave You" – Tinchy Stryder featuring Amelle Berrabah; "Once" – Diana Vickers; "One Touch" – Mini Viva; "Real Late Starter" – Nerina Pallot; "Wonderful Life" – Hurts	
2011	"Higher"	The Saturdays	"All Time Low" – The Wanted; "Ambitions" – Joe McElderry; "Beat of My Drum" – Nicola Roberts; "Do It Like a Dude" – Jessie J; "Finish Line" – Yasmin; "The Flood" – Take That; "Rolling in the Deep" – Adele; "Somebody to Love Me" – Mark Ronson & The Business Intl featuring Boy George and Andrew Wyatt; "Stay" – Hurts; "Stop Hey" – Sunday Girl; "Taking Over the Dancefloor" – Nadia Oh	
2012	"Jealousy"	Will Young	"All Fired Up" – The Saturdays; "Down with the Trumpets" – Rizzle Kicks; "Feel the Love" – Rudimental featuring John Newman; "Heart Skips a Beat" – Olly Murs featuring Rizzle Kicks; "Power & Control" – Marina and the Diamonds; "Powerless" – Siobhan Dillon; "Promises" – Nero; "Taking Over Me" – Lawson; "Tonight" – Saint Etienne; "What Makes You Beautiful" – One Direction; "Wings" – Little Mix	
2013	"The Mother We Share"	Chvrches	"The Apple" – VV Brown; "Candy" – Robbie Williams; "Cut Copy Me" – Petula Clark; "Dear Darlin'" – Olly Murs; "DNA" – Little Mix; "Flatline" – Mutya Keisha Siobhan; "Gentleman" – The Saturdays; "Kiss You" – One Direction; "Need U (100%)" – Duke Dumont featuring A*M*E; "Something New" – Girls Aloud; "White Noise" – Disclosure featuring AlunaGeorge	
2014	"Move"	Little Mix	"Boom Clap" – Charli XCX; "Crying for No Reason" – Katy B; "Ghost" – Ella Henderson; "I Will Never Let You Down" – Rita Ora; "Me and My Broken Heart" – Rixton; "One More Sleep" – Leona Lewis; "Solo Dancing" – Indiana; "Story Of My Life" – One Direction; "Take Shelter" – Years & Years; "Tough Love – Jessie Ware; "Uptight Downtown" – La Roux	
2015	"Black Magic"	Little Mix	"Body Talk" – Foxes; "Don't Be So Hard On Yourself" – Jess Glynne; "I Loved You" – Blonde featuring Melissa Steel; "I'm a Ruin" – Marina and the Diamonds; "King" – Years & Years; "Losing" – Becky Hill; "Love Me Like You Do" – Ellie Goulding; "Seasons" – Olly Murs; "The Thrill" – Nero; "Turn The Music Louder (Rumble)" – KDA, Tinie Tempah, and Katy B; "Uptown Funk" – Mark Ronson featuring Bruno Mars	
2016	"Pillowtalk"	Zayn	"Do It Well" – XYconstant featuring Tom Aspaul; "Elizabeth Taylor" – Clare Maguire; "Hotter than Hell" – Dua Lipa; "Love Me Like You" – Little Mix; "Party Politics" – The Rhythm Method; "Sax" – Fleur East; "Somebody Else" – The 1975; "Something in the Way You Move" – Ellie Goulding; "Tears" – Clean Bandit featuring Louisa Johnson; "What's It Gonna Be?" – Shura; "You Don't Know Love" – Olly Murs	
2017	"Touch"	Little Mix	"1UL" – Danny L Harle; "Best Behaviour" – Louisa Johnson; "Boys" – Charli XCX; "Feels" – Calvin Harris featuring Pharrell Williams, Katy Perry and Big Sean; "Just Say" – KDA and Tinashe; "On My Mind" – Disciples; "Reborn" – Rae Morris; "Rockabye" – Clean Bandit, Anne-Marie and Sean Paul; "Scared of the Dark" – Steps; "Shape of You" – Ed Sheeran; "Slow Hands" – Niall Horan	
2018	"Anywhere"	Rita Ora	"All or Nothing" – Naughty Boy featuring Ray BLK and Wyclef Jean; "Dancefloor" – Tracey Thorn; "Do It" – Rae Morris; "Falling into Me" – Let's Eat Grandma; "Love Lasts Forever" – All Saints; "One Kiss" – Calvin Harris and Dua Lipa; "Paradise" – George Ezra; "Pat Earrings" – CASisDEAD; "Solo" – Clean Bandit featuring Demi Lovato; "Waking Up Slow" – Gabrielle Aplin; "Word of Mouth" – Metroplane and Bree Runway	
2019	"About Work the Dancefloor"	Georgia	"Baby" – Clean Bandit featuring Marina and Luis Fonsi; "Blame It on Your Love" – Charli XCX featuring Lizzo; "Different Things" – Gracey; "Electricity" – Silk City and Dua Lipa featuring Diplo and Mark Ronson; "Fingers" – Zayn; "The Human Stone" – KDA featuring Angie Stone; "Interstellar Disco" – Oscar Scheller with Pawws; "It's Not Living (If It's Not with You)" – The 1975; "Nothing Breaks Like a Heart" – Mark Ronson featuring Miley Cyrus; "Phone Down" – Stefflon Don featuring Lil Baby; "Ritual" - Tiësto, Jonas Blue and Rita Ora	
2020	"Physical"	Dua Lipa	"Alone in My Room (Gone)" – Gracey; "Another Place" – Bastille and Alessia Cara; "Break Up Song" – Little Mix; "Damn Daniel" – Bree Runway and Yung Baby Tate; "Forever" – Charli XCX; "If You're Too Shy (Let Me Know)" – The 1975; "New Me" – Ella Eyre; "Please Don't Touch" – Raye; "Save a Kiss" – Jessie Ware; "Take Care of You" – Ella Henderson; "Watermelon Sugar" – Harry Styles	
2021	"Got Me"	Laura Mvula	"Black Hole" – Griff; "Hot Hot" – Bree Runway; "I Don't Mind" – Georgia Twinn; "I Don't Really Care for You" – CMAT; "Levitating" – Dua Lipa; "Love of Your Life" – Raye; "On a Mountain" – Danny L Harle; "Right Now" – Sophie & the Giants; "She's My Religion" – Pale Waves; "Sweet Melody" – Little Mix; "What’s Your Pleasure?" – Jessie Ware	
2022	"As It Was"	Harry Styles	"All I Ever Asked" – Rachel Chinouriri; "Cardboard Box" – Flo; "Cupid" – Rose Gray; "Good Ones" – Charli XCX; "Let's Do It Again" – Jamie xx; "Merry Christmas" – Ed Sheeran and Elton John; "Panic" – Phoebe AXA; "Primadonna" – Moss Kena; "Something About Your Love" – SG Lewis; "This Hell" – Rina Sawayama; "Twice in a Lifetime" – HYYTS	
2023	"Escapism"	Raye featuring 070 Shake	"Body Better" – Maisie Peters; "Double Denim" – Skylar; "Easy Lover" – Ellie Goulding featuring Big Sean; "Falling in Love Again" – Leif Coffield and Wuh Oh; "Forget Me" – Lewis Capaldi; "Free Yourself" – Jessie Ware; "Light It Up" – Moss Kena and Super-Hi; "Lionheart (Fearless)" – Joel Corry and Tom Grennan; "Nothing Lasts Forever" – Dylan; "Nothing Left to Lose" – Everything but the Girl; "Weightless" – Arlo Parks	
2024	"Girl, So Confusing (remix)"	Charli XCX and Lorde	"A New Bohemia" – Pet Shop Boys; "Angel of My Dreams" – Jade; "Catch Me (Beautiful Fall)" – Twst; "encore" – Shygirl and Danny L Harle; "Girls" – TSHA and Rose Gray; "Healing Out of Spite" – Catty; "Houdini" – Dua Lipa; "I Like the Way You Kiss Me" – Artemas; "Never Be Lonely (Cascada Remix)" – Jax Jones; "Sabotage" – Michael Aldag; "The Thrill of It" – Pixey	
2025	"Plastic Box"	Jade	"Angel of My Dreams" – Jade; "Dealer" – Lola Young; "Diagnoses" – Kae Tempest; "Fantasy" – Jade; "FUFN (Fuck You for Now)" – Jade; "Got to Have Love" – Pulp; "I'm Not Your Punchbag" – Punchbag; "It Girl" – Jade; "New Friends" – Flowerovlove; "People Watching" – Sam Fender; "Sex, Drugs & Existential Dread" – Chloe Qisha; "Super Love Me" – Grace Davies	

== Most nominated artists ==
The following have received three or more nominations:

Artists nominated three or more times for the Popjustice £20 Music Prize
Artist	Nominations	Years
Girls Aloud	8	2003, 2004, 2005, 2006, 2007, 2008, 2009, 2013
Little Mix	8	2012, 2013, 2014, 2015, 2016, 2017, 2020, 2021
Charli XCX	6	2014, 2017, 2019, 2020, 2022, 2024
Dua Lipa	6	2016, 2018, 2019, 2020, 2021, 2024
Jade	6	2024, 2025 (5 nominations)
Calvin Harris	5	2007, 2008, 2009, 2017, 2018
Mark Ronson	5	2008, 2011, 2015, 2019 (2 nominations)
Rachel Stevens	4	2004 (2 nominations; won 1), 2005, 2006
Marina and the Diamonds	4	2010, 2012, 2015, 2019
Olly Murs	4	2012, 2013, 2015, 2016
The Saturdays	4	2009, 2011, 2012, 2013
Clean Bandit	4	2016, 2017, 2018, 2019
Jessie Ware	4	2014, 2020, 2021, 2023
Goldfrapp	3	2005, 2006, 2008
Will Young	3	2004, 2006, 2012
KDA	3	2015, 2017, 2019
Robbie Williams	3	2005, 2007, 2013
Sugababes	3	2004, 2006, 2008
The 1975	3	2016, 2019, 2020
Rita Ora	3	2014, 2018, 2019
Bree Runway	3	2018, 2020, 2021
Mini Viva	3	2010 (3 nominations)
One Direction	3	2012, 2013, 2014
Ellie Goulding	3	2015, 2016, 2023
Raye	3	2020, 2021, 2023

== See also ==
- Mercury Music Prize
