= Xenomania =

English songwriting and production team

- Origin: Kent, England
- Genres: Pop; dance-pop; electropop; pop rock; power pop
- Years active: 1996–present
- Labels: Xenomania Ltd.; Sony
- Members: Brian Higgins; Miranda Cooper; Florrie
- Past members: Tim Powell; Niara Scarlett; Jon Shave; Giselle Somerville; Jody Lei; Myra Boyle; Uzoechi Emenike; Carla Marie Williams; Edele Lynch; Lisa Cowling; Nick Coler

Xenomania is an English songwriting and production team founded by Brian Higgins and based in Kent. Formed by Higgins with his Creative Director Miranda Cooper and Business Director Sarah Stennett of First Access Entertainment, Xenomania has written and produced for artists such as Cher, Kylie Minogue, Dannii Minogue, Sophie Ellis-Bextor, Pet Shop Boys, The Saturdays and Sugababes. In particular, all but one of Girls Aloud's studio albums have been entirely written and produced by Xenomania. Sugababes' "Round Round" and Girls Aloud's "Sound of the Underground" have been credited with reshaping British pop music for the 2000s. Gabriella Cilmi's "Sweet About Me" and Girls Aloud's "The Promise" were named Best Single at the ARIA Music Awards of 2008 and the 2009 BRIT Awards, respectively.

The team has been referred to as "a Phil Spector" and "a Motown of the 21st-century". Higgins himself has said that Xenomania aspires to be a modern-day version of RAK Records. Of Higgins and Xenomania, Girls Aloud's former manager Louis Walsh says, "He just makes great songs for radio. They just jump out at you and stay in your brain." There are wide influences present in their productions, including electronic, glam rock, Motown soul, punk, and more traditional pop music. The name "Xenomania" means, according to Higgins, "the exact opposite of Xenophobia [...] a love of everything, of all cultures." Current members of the Xenomania writing and production team are Higgins and Cooper. Long term members Tim Powell and Nick Coler left in 2010. Xenomania also includes a house band who work on potential songs, including Florrie on drums. French remixer Fred Falke also frequently works with Xenomania.

Xenomania started a "record label" of the same name in 2008, developing artists and working on material before looking for major label deals. Artists include Alex Gardner, Jessie Malakouti, Mini Viva and Vagabond.

== History ==
Brian Higgins found early success after producing Australian singer Dannii Minogue's third album, Girl (1997), which gained favourable reviews at the time but failed to enter the British Top 40. However, the success of the lead single, "All I Wanna Do", led to a collaboration with American singer Cher and Higgins co-writing her international number-one hit single "Believe" (1998). Although the song outperformed all expectations and won him three Ivor Novello awards, Higgins found himself without a label when London Records was sold in 2000. After eighteen months, he decided to found Xenomania as an independent production company based in Westerham in Kent, outside London, because it is "somewhere where concentration would be easy [and] no one 'pops' in."

Higgins met Miranda Cooper at the 1996 Eurovision Song Contest when she was a backing dancer for Gina G, while Matt Gray had started his musical career in the 1980s, writing music for the Commodore 64 home computer. Nick Coler programmed The KLF's singles and Tim Powell started out in 1989 "doing hardcore rave stuff". Higgins attempted to launch Cooper as a solo artist under the stage name Moonbaby but failed to find success. "That's when we started writing for other people", according to Cooper. "I'd had writer's block for myself, but as soon as it was for somebody else all these songs popped out." Moonbaby's "Here We Go" would later be recorded by both Lene Nystrøm Rasted and Girls Aloud.

=== 2002–2004: Commercial breakthrough ===
We first met them [the Sugababes] in October 2001 and we'd spent the previous twelve months working on our own musical direction. We were getting quite desperate as we were struggling to connect with the predominantly R&B artists we'd get sent. Our ideas seemed a bit out of place, and for that reason we connected with the Sugababes as I felt they too were a little out on a limb from the pop mainstream at the time.

— Brian Higgins, Popjustice, 2004.

Higgins says, "We developed this sound of electronics and guitars fusing together but this was in the late Nineties when R'n'B lite dominated pop music and we had to wait for our opening." When British girl group Sugababes were dropped by London Records, they recorded "Round Round" with Xenomania, which Higgins says was "fusing electronics and guitars and tempo changes and melody shifts, so that the chorus was the only repetitive melody whereas traditional pop structure repeats verse melodies." The song would later become a UK number-one single for Sugababes in 2002. Higgins praised Sugababes for the "crucial role" in Xenomania's subsequent success—"To me they represented something superior to what was out there. As a result, the Sugababes undoubtedly brought the best out of us as we always felt under pressure to produce results that would do justice to their voices and overall talent."

Xenomania were approached to create the debut single for a girl group formed through the television talent show Popstars: The Rivals. The eventual winners, Girls Aloud, recorded "Sound of the Underground", one of sixty songs that Higgins and Cooper had written with the aim of launching their own girl group. Higgins said Girls Aloud were "a blueprint for a girl group that we'd had in our minds for ages, one that was individual rather than generic, with a sound that blurs the edges between pop and indie. We know that people aren't really interested in pop music as it was." "Sound of the Underground" received critical acclaim, with The Guardian exclaiming it "proved a first: it was a reality pop record that didn't make you want to do physical harm to everyone involved in its manufacture." The song was the Christmas number-one of 2002, selling just over 213,000 copies in its first week of release. The single spent four consecutive weeks at number one, achieving a platinum certification from the British Phonographic Industry. "Round Round" and "Sound of the Underground" have been called "two huge groundbreaking hits", credited with reshaping British pop music for the 2000s. The Telegraph placed the latter song at number 15 on a list of 100 songs that defined the 2000s, while NME included it at number 39.

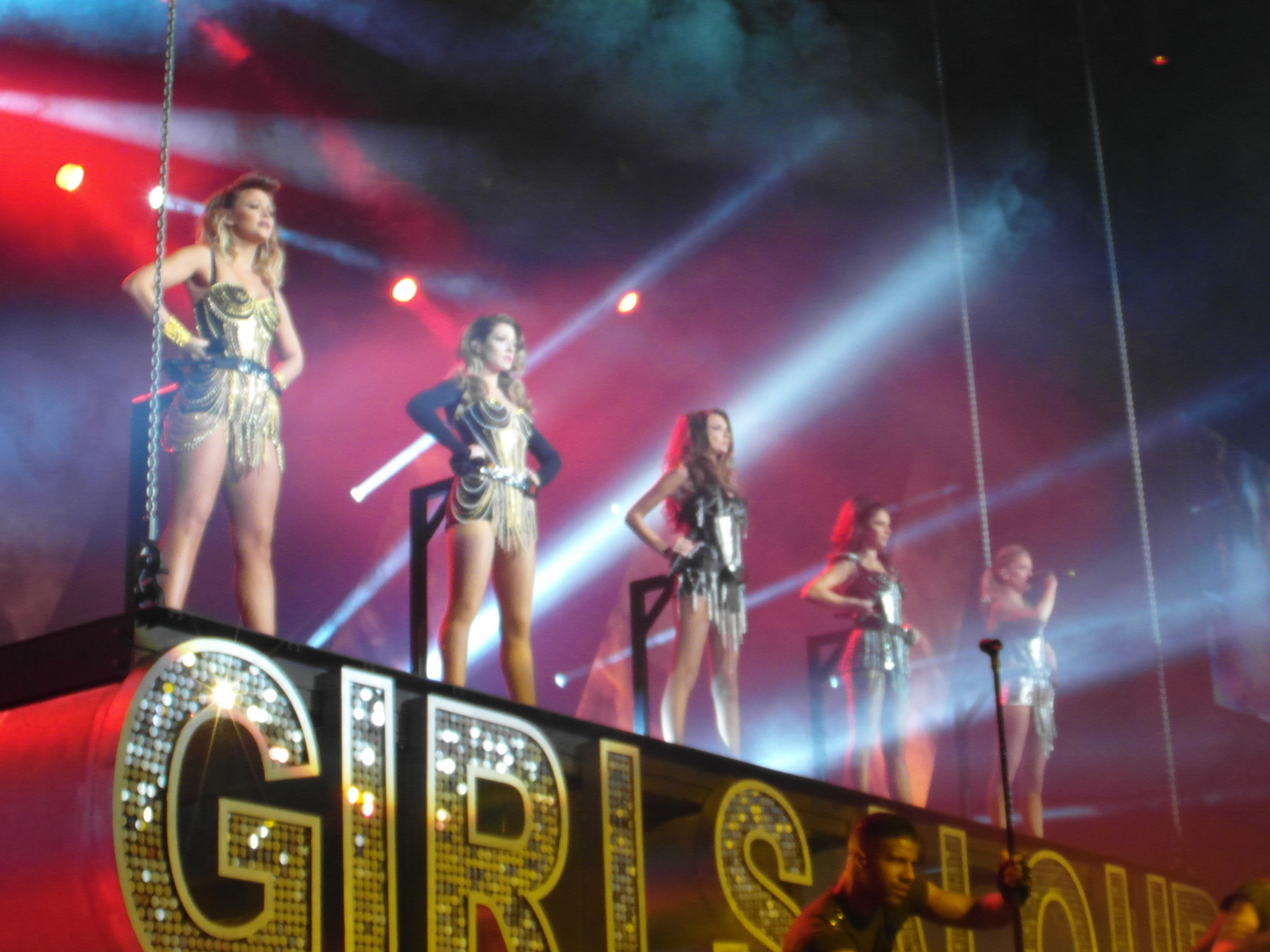
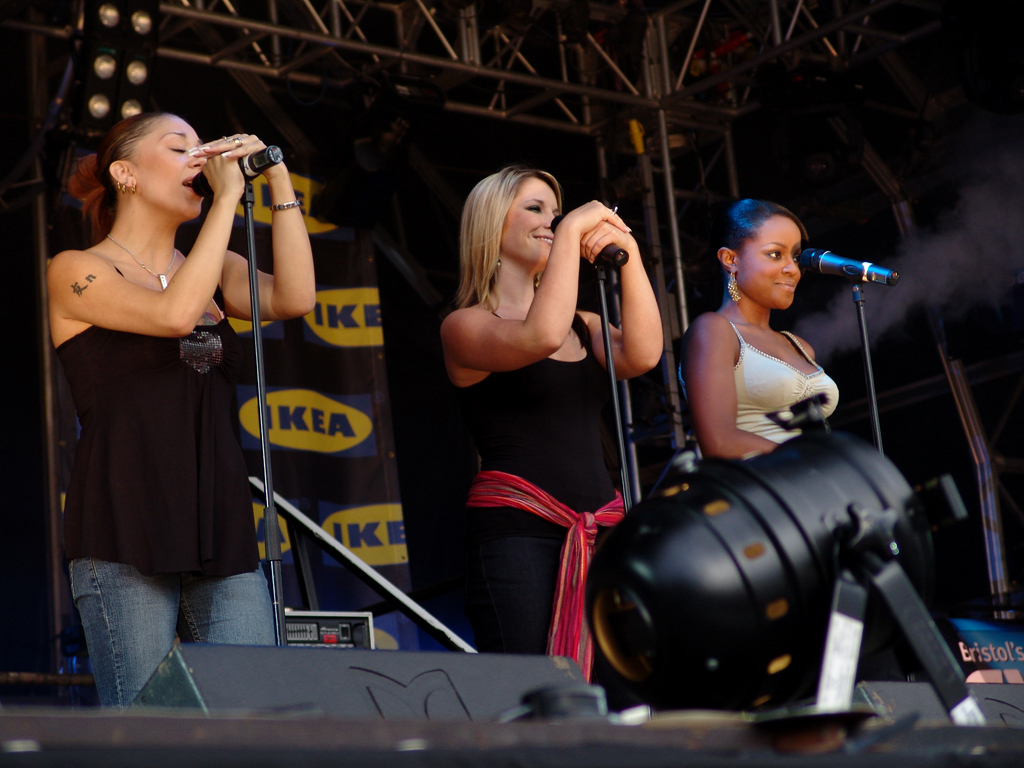
Xenomania wrote and produced UK number-one singles for girl groups Girls Aloud (left) and Sugababes (right).

In 2003, Xenomania wrote and produced "No Good Advice" for Girls Aloud, which reflected Higgins' general mood of failure after the deal between Xenomania and London Records fell through. Shortly afterwards, Higgins heard the other tracks that Girls Aloud had recorded for their debut album Sound of the Underground and was dissatisfied with the obscurity and inconsistency of the group's direction, and personally intervened to produce four more original tracks for the album to replace some of the weaker content. Shortly after the album's release, another round of sessions during that summer yielded three new tracks that later surfaced on a reissue of the album in November, including a massively successful cover version of The Pointer Sisters song "Jump" for the film Love Actually. It was said that "Higgins injects an element of instant-catchy-cool to the songs without going overboard in trying to shape uber-chic dance floor hits." Also that year, they produced the singles "Miss Perfect" and "7 Ways" for former Five member Abs's solo album, Abstract Theory. Sugababes' "Hole in the Head", another UK number-one, was one of several tracks for their album Three that were co-written and produced by the Xenomania team. According to Higgins, he knew "Hole in the Head" was "the single" as soon as he heard the backing track again: "Those moments of clarity are the best bit about the music business. We try to find perfect matches unique to the artist we are working with". Cooper—who recalled being "scared" of Sugababes because of their heavy involvement in the songwriting process—said that Xenomania made a conscious effort to differentiate their Sugababes work from that of Girls Aloud, giving the former group an "urban feel" and the latter a "punky [and] guitar-led" sound.

Following the success of Girls Aloud's first four singles, Xenomania was enlisted to produce Girls Aloud's second album, What Will the Neighbours Say?, in its entirety. Higgins said, "The pressure to come up with singles was, as always, immense. But [...] we were able to have a lot of fun working on ideas that were maybe a little too odd to be on the radio." The Guardian hailed Neighbours as "a great album: funny, clever, immediate, richly inventive." Stylus Magazine declared, "There is no pop in the world like Girls Aloud today." All four of the album's singles ("The Show", "Love Machine", "I'll Stand by You" and "Wake Me Up") were top five.

Xenomania were approached to work with Australian pop singer Kylie Minogue on new tracks for her greatest hits collection Ultimate Kylie, including the single "Giving You Up", which developed a reputation among her fans as one of her worst singles. Other Xenomania productions proved less successful. Mania was a joint venture between Higgins and BMG. The duo, consisting of Xenomania songwriters Giselle Sommerville and Niara Scarlett, released one single before being dropped. The boy band V, whose single "Hip to Hip" was produced by Xenomania, was short lived. Higgins called V "bright and motivated, with a lot of charisma [...] When we decide to work with an artist it is normally a decision based on personality and the challenge we feel it holds for us".

=== 2005–2007: Critical acclaim ===
On paper, Girls Aloud shouldn't still be around, so we go into the making of every record with a view that they have to do something exceptional to warrant even existing. It means their records have to try and be as competitive as anyone else's, whether it's the hottest hip-hop producer from LA, or the hottest guitar band from Sheffield. That's been the driving force of our relationship with the group—to defy expectations.

— Brian Higgins, GQ, June 2006.

Higgins and Xenomania were once again given free rein for Girls Aloud's third album, Chemistry. The album's second single, "Biology", was critically acclaimed, being called "the best pop single of the last decade". Despite the group's near total obscurity in the United States, the song was listed at number 245 on Pitchfork Media's "The Top 500 Tracks of the 2000s" list. It was also listed at number 23 on The Observer Music Monthly's 75 best singles of the decade. Chemistry was praised by critics upon its release. BBC Music decided that the album was "quirky, modern and dripping with attitude" and "holds no disappointments." Virgin Media gave the album five stars, saying it was "bursting [...] with invention, quirky lyrics, tongue-in-cheek sauciness and [...] appeals to grown-up pop fans and music critics as well as to the teenyboppers." In 2008, Slant Magazine said that "Chemistry is probably still their crowning glory".

Xenomania worked with other British artists such as Bananarama, Texas, and Rachel Stevens. They contributed tracks to Stevens' album Come and Get It, a commercial failure that The Guardian listed among its "1000 Albums to Hear Before You Die" and hailed as "a riot, thanks to a stellar team of pop producers [...] who seem to have taken the precarious state of Stevens' career as an excuse to let their imaginations run amok". Xenomania continued their work with both Saint Etienne and Sugababes, producing the latter's UK top five single "Red Dress" (from the 2005 album Taller in More Ways), described by The Observer as "a thumping tour de force from Xenomania [...] Not unexpectedly, it flirts vivaciously with pop songwriting convention, boasting not one but two killer choruses". Xenomania also produced Totally Frank stars Frank's 2006 debut album; the group was dropped after their album failed to perform well.

In 2006, Girls Aloud released their first greatest hits collection, The Sound of Girls Aloud, which featured their singles to date—all produced by Xenomania—including the new track "Something Kinda Ooooh". The song was referred to as "another head-spinningly innovative number from the Xenomania team." The Sound of Girls Aloud has been recognised by the IFPI as a million-seller. Their fourth studio album, 2007's Tangled Up, was labelled "yet another unrelenting pop masterpiece." The Times included it at number 62 on a list of the decade's best pop albums. The single "Call the Shots" was critically acclaimed, with pop music journalist Peter Robinson calling it the "greatest pop song of the 21st century." Xenomania also worked with Alesha Dixon (on the single "Knockdown"), Sophie Ellis-Bextor, and produced two songs for Sugababes' fifth studio album, Change.

=== 2008–present ===
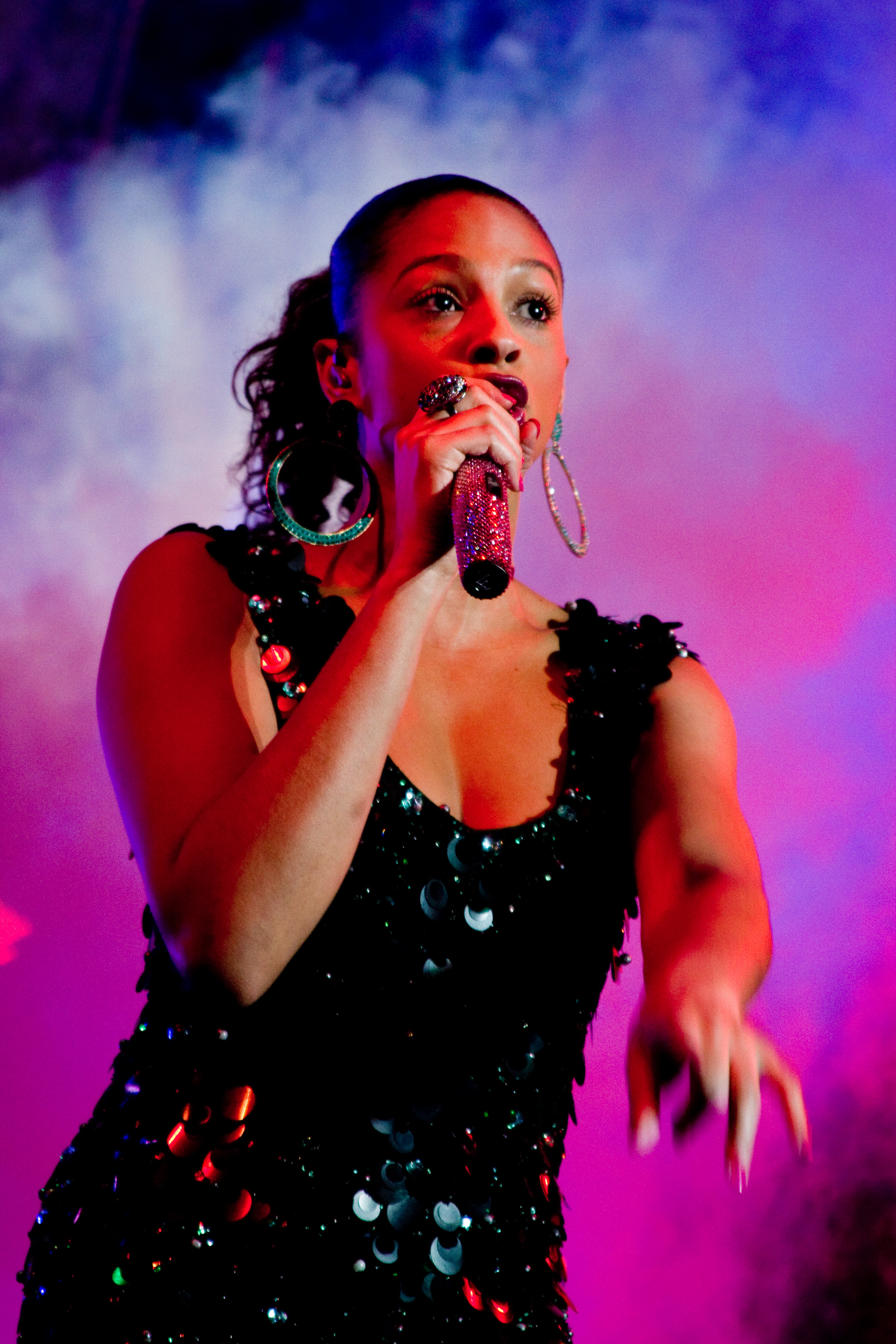
Alesha Dixon scored her first UK top five single as a solo artist with "The Boy Does Nothing" (2008).

In 2008, Xenomania's success continued. Australian singer-songwriter Gabriella Cilmi released her Xenomania-produced debut album, Lessons to Be Learned. The single "Sweet About Me", inspired by "obscure Parisian psychedelic records" that Higgins and Cooper had introduced to Cilmi, was an international success. The Independent called the song "one of the most infectious, radio-friendly pop tunes [...] of the past five years, right up there with 'Video Games' and 'American Boy'". At the ARIA Music Awards of 2009, Cilmi won six awards including Single of the Year for "Sweet About Me". In the United Kingdom, Alesha Dixon's "The Boy Does Nothing" was her first solo top five single. Higgins likened the song to "bottled happiness". Xenomania produced seven more tracks for the album The Alesha Show and an additional two for its reissue.

While at work on Girls Aloud's fifth studio album, Out of Control, two members of the Xenomania house band, Jason Resch and Kieran Jones, composed the backing track for "The Promise", which they played for Higgins. He and Cooper, afraid they'd "ruin the moment", waited weeks to write the song's lyrics; they wrote the song in seven minutes. Higgins said, "We knew that was the piece of music Girls Aloud needed to announce them as a supergroup in this country, so we knew we couldn't drop the ball melodically or lyrically." "The Promise" became Girls Aloud's first non-cover version number-one single since "Sound of the Underground". The single became the fastest selling single of 2008 at the time. "The Promise" won Best British Single at the 2009 BRIT Awards, Girls Aloud and Xenomania's first win at the ceremony. The album Out of Control became Girls Aloud's first number-one studio album.

Pet Shop Boys' tenth studio album, Yes, was produced by Brian Higgins and Xenomania. Yes reached number four on the UK Albums Chart in 2009, Pet Shop Boys' highest placing since their 1996 album Bilingual. The album was nominated in the Best Electronic/Dance Album category at the 52nd Grammy Awards. Don't Stop, the second album by Norwegian singer Annie, was released in 2009 and includes several tracks produced and co-written by Xenomania, including the single "My Love Is Better". NME magazine called Don't Stop "Xenomania-abetted lipstick-pop genius".

Pop duo Mini Viva's three singles—"Left My Heart in Tokyo", "I Wish" (both 2009), and "One Touch" (2010)—were produced by Xenomania. "Left My Heart in Tokyo", which charted within the top ten, was co-written by Annie and Fred Falke. The song was critically acclaimed, and all three singles were shortlisted for the annual Popjustice £20 Music Prize. Xenomania worked with a number of other new artists, such as Alex Gardner, Jessie Malakouti, and Vagabond, to varying degrees of success (see artist development). In 2011, Xenomania produced two tracks for The Saturdays' album On Your Radar, including their top five hit "All Fired Up", which was co-produced with Space Cowboy and MNEK. The same year, they produced songs for The X Factor runner-up Rebecca Ferguson, British boy band The Wanted, and girl group SoundGirl.

Xenomania worked with another X Factor alumnus (and Xenomania Records signee), Amelia Lily, producing and writing an album that was subsequently shelved. Lily's debut single, "You Bring Me Joy" (2012), reached number two and was described by pop music blog MuuMuse as "110% incredible". Higgins assumed production duties for indie rock Gossip's album A Joyful Noise, a collaboration met with scepticism by Vice magazine—"This is not the first time indie artists have fallen for his [Higgins'] cred-pop charms [...] no one involved managed to work out that Gossip isn't a pop band". Also in 2012, Xenomania recorded with Mutya Keisha Siobhan—a group consisting of the first line-up of the Sugababes—and Little Mix.

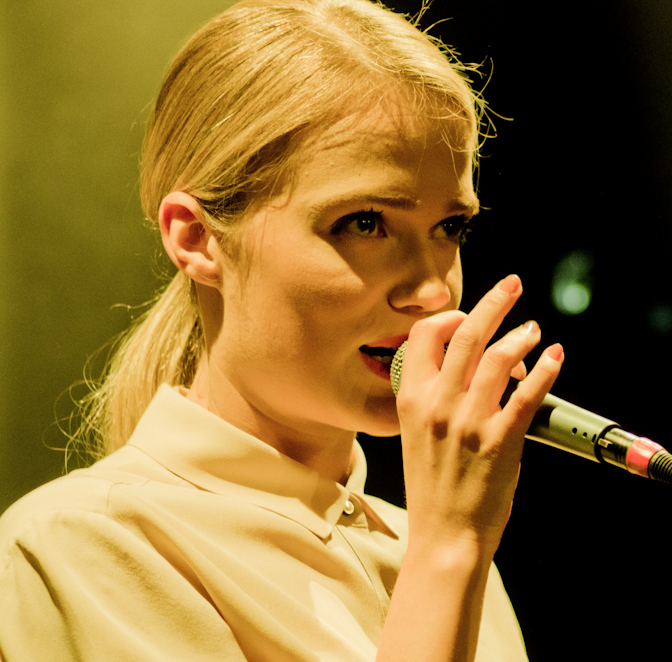
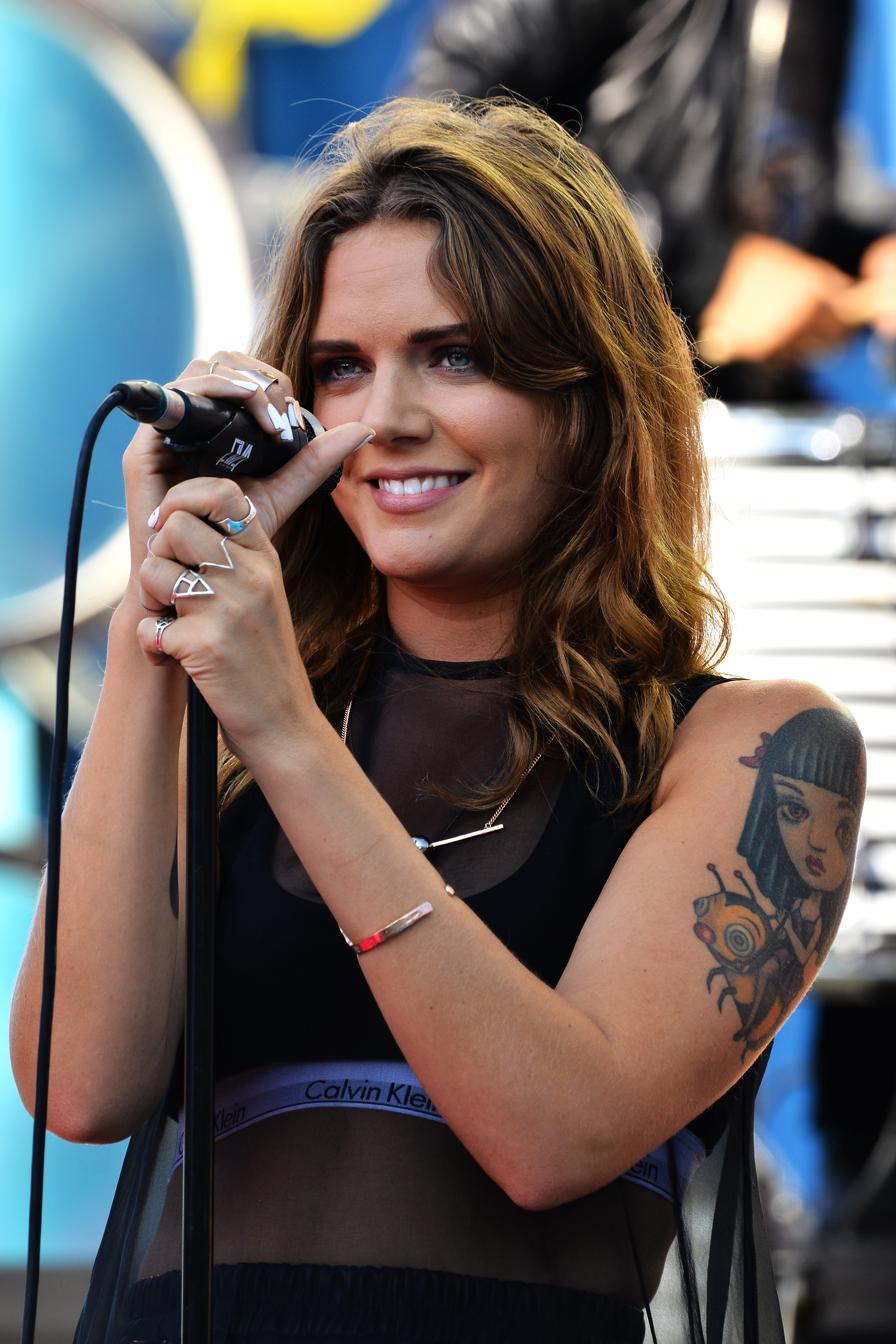
Girls Aloud's "Something New" (2012) and The Saturdays' "What Are You Waiting For?" (2014) were co-written by Florrie (left) and Tove Lo (right).

Xenomania contributed two new tracks—including the single "Something New"—to Girls Aloud's second compilation album, Ten, the group's first album since announcing a hiatus after Out of Control (2008). BBC Music hailed Ten as "incredible proof of how perfect pop can be in the right hands" and wrote that "Alongside the Xenomania hit machine, at their best Girls Aloud create a universe entirely of their own, standing as one of the greatest pop acts of this century". Cooper later said of Xenomania's relationship with the group, who split up in 2013, "We kind of thought of ourselves as a bit of the band, so the essence of Xeno was Girls Aloud. They were our creative muses and, therefore, a lot of the stuff was written by ourselves. They got more involved in the writing as time went on, but we were probably all a little bit guilty of having an inner pop star desperate to get out of Xeno".

In 2014, Xenomania produced "What Are You Waiting For?" for The Saturdays, the lead single from the group's greatest hits album Finest Selection. Also that year, Xenomania reunited with former Girls Aloud member Nadine Coyle to write and produce material for Coyle's upcoming second studio album. The sessions have so far yielded three singles, "Go to Work", "Fool for Love" and "All That I Know" as well as an EP, titled Nadine.

On 23 January 2019, Xenomania launched a four-member girl group called unperfect, releasing their debut single "Gots To Give The Girl" on the following day. However, unperfect did not stay together for very long, with Xenomania moving on to produce a five-piece girl group called CuteBad by 2022.

=== Failed collaborations ===
Xenomania worked with American pop singer Britney Spears in 2003 during sessions for her fourth album In the Zone. The song submitted, "Graffiti My Soul", was not chosen for the album. While the record company loved the song, Spears felt that it needed more of a chorus. Higgins said that they wanted "essentially 'Sound of the Underground 2'." It later appeared on Girls Aloud's What Will the Neighbours Say?.

The production team were due to work with rock bands New Order and Franz Ferdinand, but both sessions proved fruitless. Xenomania was due to produce for New Order's Waiting for the Sirens' Call, but Peter Hook said they "scrapped the Brian Higgins stuff because we didn't like it. I thought he did quite a good job on Girls Aloud but he didn't do a good job on us." Franz Ferdinand's drummer Paul Thomson said, "We wrote with Higgins for a while and initially we thought we'd work more with him but it didn't really work out. We just realized that we're not really a pop group."

Higgins spoke of bad experiences with bigger artists to Literally magazine in 2009:

"Everything about us is about enormous enthusiasm for something. And therefore big artists can come in and they think "they're the flavour of the whatever, let's take their thing and then we'll do what we want with it..." Well, no, that's not acceptable anyway. I've had that experience happen where the big artists were fine until they got into the mix room and then they basically pulled the record to pieces. So I took my name off the record and the writing credits off the record. Because they're assholes. And they sold about 20,000 copies, and they've never been seen since. So big artists are often jerks of the biggest order. And often people say don't meet your heroes because you'll be let down, and I sort of understand why people would say that."

== Members ==
=== Current members ===
- Brian Higgins
- Miranda Cooper
- Carla Marie (2007–present)
- Florrie (2010–present)

=== Former members ===
- Tim Powell (1997–2010)
- Niara Scarlett (2000–2004)
- Jon Shave

== Artist development ==
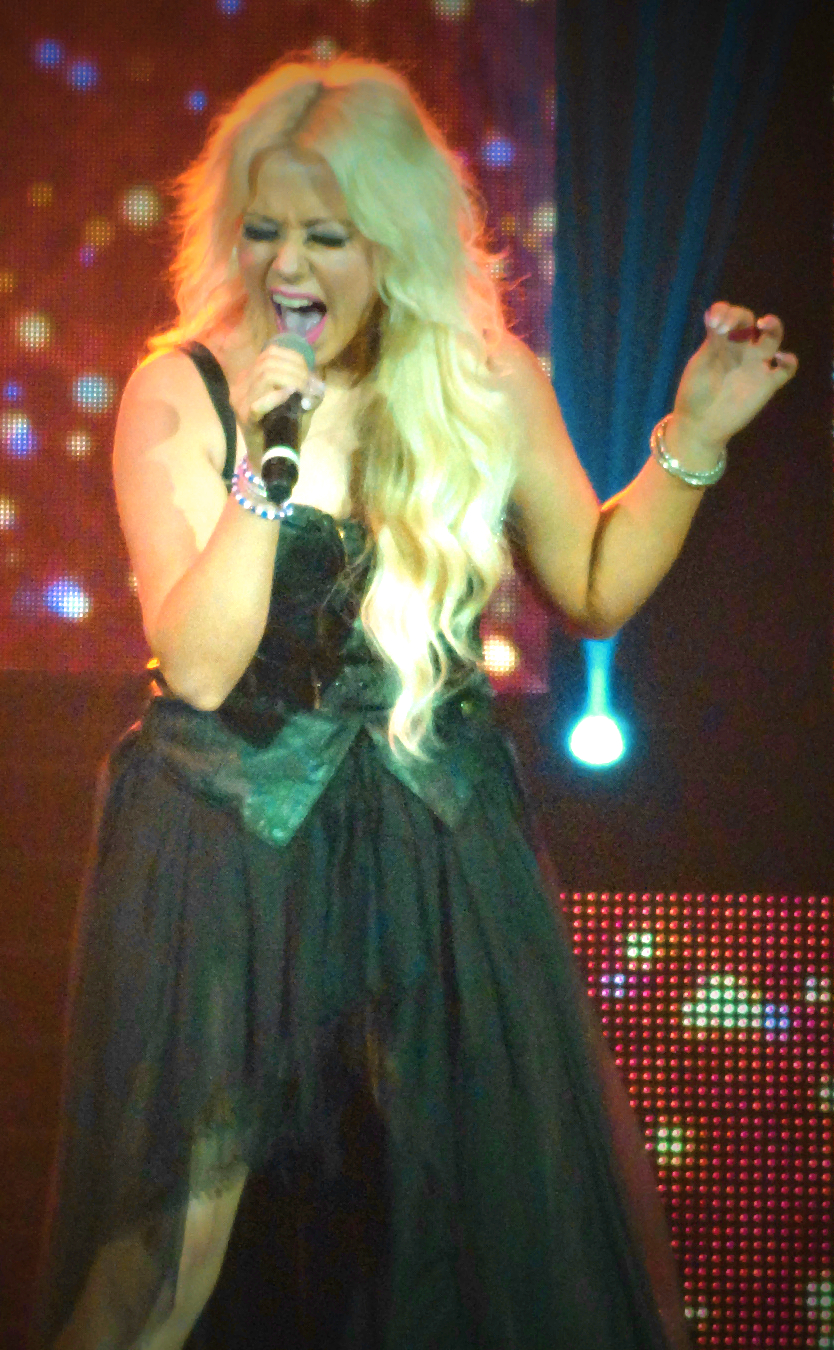
Amelia Lily, a finalist on The X Factor, signed to Xenomania Records in 2012.

Xenomania spent two years looking for talent worldwide, establishing Xenomania Records. Higgins said, "It's very difficult to get in. Everyone's hand-picked." They write, produce, and rehearse music before they "sell record companies the artists they've discovered and developed." He also noted, "We'd love to be a modern day version of RAK, where the artists are signed and developed here." The goal is to establish an "entertainment company, with Higgins [...] presiding over a pool of talent, retaining key rights to the artists they develop." Higgins also says, "I object to the word 'manufactured' cause I think it's invariably said with a vague sneer. The real phrase is 'producer driven'." The Guardian described the Xenomania audition process as "find keen, dreamy singers they like and nurture them into fresh, distinctive shape over many months, patiently creating a soundtrack specifically tailored to the energy, background and character of the performers".

In 2009, Xenomania held a "mini festival" entitled Xenofest in which they showcased their artists to journalists, record label representatives, and PRs. Vagabond were formed through the programme. Vagabond's vocalist Alex Vargas said, "It sounds cheesy, but we really are one big family". Mini Viva, who were formed in 2007, spent two years working with Xenomania before their launch. Other artists discovered and developed through Xenomania Records include Alex Gardner, Brooke X and Jessie Malakouti. Commenting on the underperformances of Gardner and Mini Viva's singles, Popbitch wrote that the publicity surrounding the latter act may have placed "too much emphasis on a 30 and 40-something production duo" that "shouldn't be trying to be the next Timbaland or Red One [sic]".

In 2012, Xenomania Records became an imprint of Sony Music Entertainment and signed Amelia Lily, a finalist from The X Factor. Xenomania's in-house drummer Florrie Arnold signed to Sony after finding Internet success. Xenomania held an open audition for recording artists in London's Shoreditch area in 2013.

== Work ethic ==
Higgins told The Telegraph in August 2009, "Pop is where the cutting edge of music is but it needs to be done with total sincerity and an incredible amount of skill, otherwise it doesn't warrant its own existence. There is a science to it, but there's magic too. You have to find the space where art and commerce truly meet in the middle, with genuine feeling and sentiment." He has also said, "pop music is maths."

A lot of the songs have come out of a tiny place, a seed of an idea. Round Round was a beat. Biology, that was just the little piano hook at the beginning, but I remember it probably took two years to work out how to come out of that intro, what it would go into. The Promise, that track was ready to go. Brian was so sure it was going to be a huge hit that we literally planned the day that we would be writing this 'number one'. I think that was obviously when we'd had a lot of success and we were very confident. With Something Kinda Ooh he was thinking of doing a bit like a Too Funky George Michael vibe, which was actually how it started off, but then it ended up something very different. He always has a vision, he knows exactly what he's doing before we do.

— Miranda Cooper, Songwriting Magazine, April 2015.

Xenomania are notable for their abnormal writing process. According to an article in Q magazine's October 2009 issue, "they each work on backing tracks, chords or beats, Higgins choosing the best bits and building up songs like jigsaws." The various pieces of music are discussed at daily meetings and the best become the basis of songs. Higgins "separate[s] music, melody, lyric" and strives to preserve "high level of originality, excitement and dynamism in the writing." Higgins has "the final say on everything [and establishes] the creative direction projects will take". If a piece of music "sounds enticing before a vocal has gone anywhere near it", Higgins and Cooper will "sketch out" the melody and lyrics. Xenomania may also create multiple melodies over the same backing track and then select the best. Higgins said "we're just not interested in the way other people do things. [...] I've trained not just me but myself, Miranda, Tim, we've trained our minds to think that way".

Higgins also insists that artists are involved to an extent. Referring to Girls Aloud in a 2004 interview with The Observer, Higgins said, "We don't let them out of the room till they've given every ounce of melodic instinct that they've got in them, [...] at the end, you find they've contributed really well." Neil Tennant noted that Higgins "works you very hard. He's very headmaster-ly." Tennant's partner, Chris Lowe, said Higgins "puts stars by your work, and comments. It's ruthless. It's fantastic!" Norwegian singer Annie said of Higgins, "he's making music all the time and he's really creative and has a lot of good ideas. Serious and ambitious. It gave me an extra punch to work really hard and that was exactly what I needed." Australian singer Gabriella Cilmi has remarked that working with Higgins "brings out the best in me [...] He knows how to make my silliness good". According to Cooper, the artist's vocal performance on a track is "the final piece of the puzzle", and songs with "amazing" choruses have been shelved as a result of the artist not sounding adequate on them.

On Xenomania's relatively low output (compared to a group like Stock, Aitken & Waterman), Higgins says, "If you're a production house, you're supposed to work with anyone and everyone: that's the rule...but if we don't feel excited by the prospect of the artist, then the record's going to be shit." Higgins refuses to work "purely for the fee" for the same reasons. He says, "People are coming to me already with a quality idea in mind, because they've heard it. [...] But people need to understand that when they hear something that we've done on the radio, a process has been followed to achieve that." Xenomania have reportedly turned away Atomic Kitten and Gareth Gates.

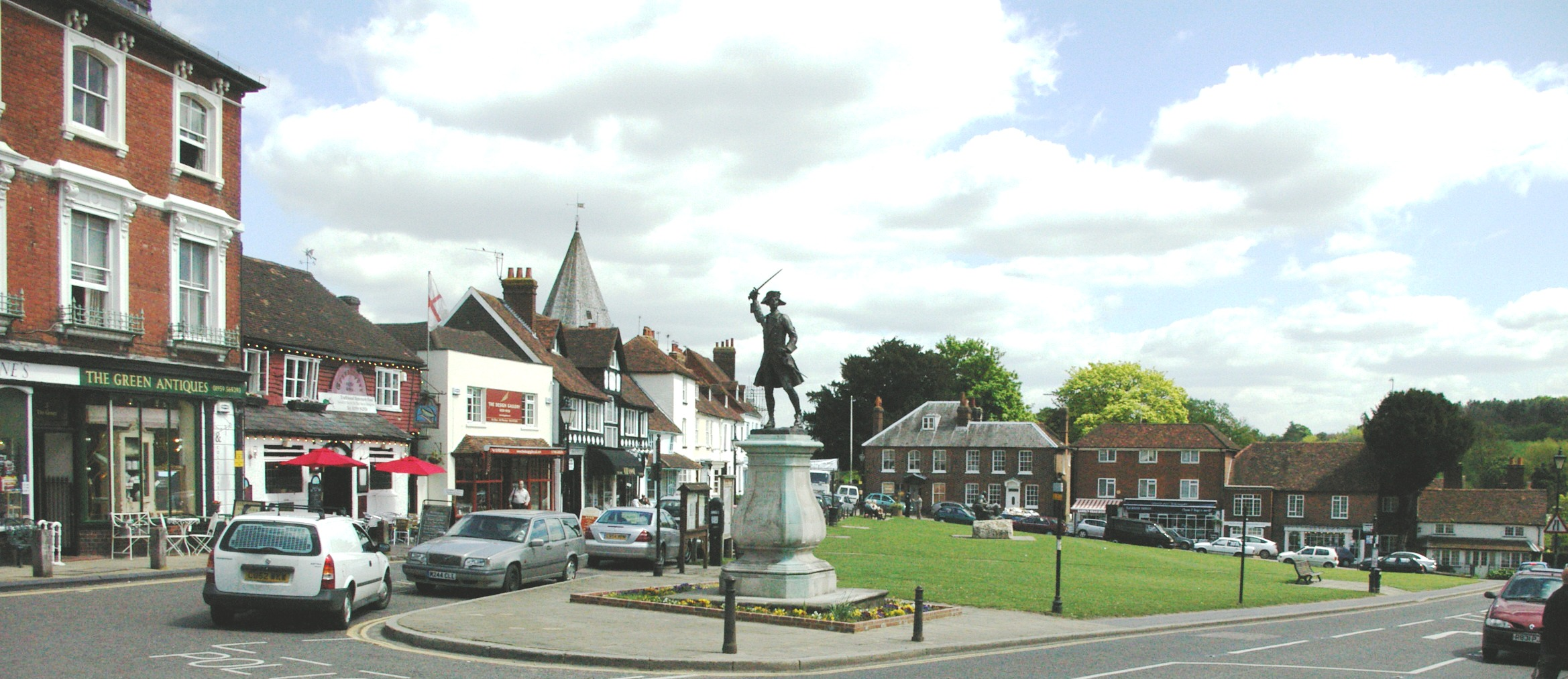
Xenomania are based in Westerham, Kent (pictured).

Peter Robinson, writing for The Guardian, credited the effectiveness of Xenomania's output with the number of people working with Higgins: "it's not really just five girls [Girls Aloud] and Brian Higgins—a whole team were at work with an acute understanding of how to manufacture an excellent pop phenomenon". Songwriters and producers who have worked for Xenomania include Annie, Fred Falke, Tove Lo, Edele Lynch (of Irish girl group B*Witched), MNEK, Deedee Ray, and Olivia Redmond (formerly of SoundGirl). Cooper says that high levels of quality control result from "a group of all sorts of artists, all songwriters, writing hooks on the same track [...] Brian had no worries choosing melodies from wherever they came from. He didn't mind if it was the person making tea in the office—if they came up with something, which they often did, that would be used". Neil Tennant of Pet Shop Boys said that Xenomania "reminded me of working at Smash Hits 'cos [sic] you've got this house full of people and they're all totally into music. [...] They all have comments to make. A truly great atmosphere."

Xenomania work from a large English country house located in Kent, where Higgins also lives, and a flat in Shoreditch. They have also been known to write at hotels. The country home formerly belonged to Alice Liddell, the inspiration behind Lewis Carroll's novel Alice's Adventures in Wonderland. It was put up for sale in 2015.

== Influences ==
Of the production group's philosophy and outlook, Higgins says, "What we stand for [...] is everything about the interesting side of music, but with tunes the postman will whistle." There are a number of influences present in Xenomania's productions, including electronic, glam rock, Motown soul, punk, and more traditional pop music. The Observer wrote that Xenomania are "sonically pioneering songs that have combined dance, rock and rave and resulted in the group being championed by NME as often as MTV." Pet Shop Boys member Neil Tennant noted that Xenomania "never stick to one sound, so they're never boring. They have a big range."

The varied sound of the production house is influenced by Higgin's own wide tastes growing up. Higgins says, "I discovered punk music, then New Romantic music, then dance music, which got me into the music business professionally." Higgins was a fan of punk rock groups such as the Buzzcocks and the Sex Pistols, as well as more electronic groups such as New Order. Additionally, Higgins "was obsessed with synthesisers [...] Duran Duran and the way they utilised synths, which I thought was amazingly clever, and Japan, and Depeche Mode."

To stay relevant, Higgins said the team avoids "listening to the radio [or] following contemporary fashions", noting that Girls Aloud's "Call the Shots" "started as a piece of music in 2005, was written as a song in 2006 and came out [...] in November 2007." However, Paul Thomson of Franz Ferdinand said, "He has a team in the kitchen listening to Radio 1 all day, monitoring what's being played. And he has somebody watching fashion TV all day making notes on what kind of beats they're using." Cooper has mentioned that one of Xenomania's policies is to recruit young people "as Brian and I aren't out in the clubs raving it up anymore".

== Critical response and recognition ==
Since their inception, Xenomania has garnered praise from all areas of the international media. Pitchfork Media, which generally focuses on independent music, praised Xenomania for their "deathless hooks and multi-genre pyrotechnics [...] songs stuffed to the gills with one, two, three, sometimes four different choruses, sounding like patchwork assemblages of the best bits of a hundred fantasy pop songs." In 2006, British pop website Popjustice stated, "This cartel of songwriters and producers are the most talented pop powerhouse since the glory days of Cheiron, and could easily become the most exciting British hit machine of all time."

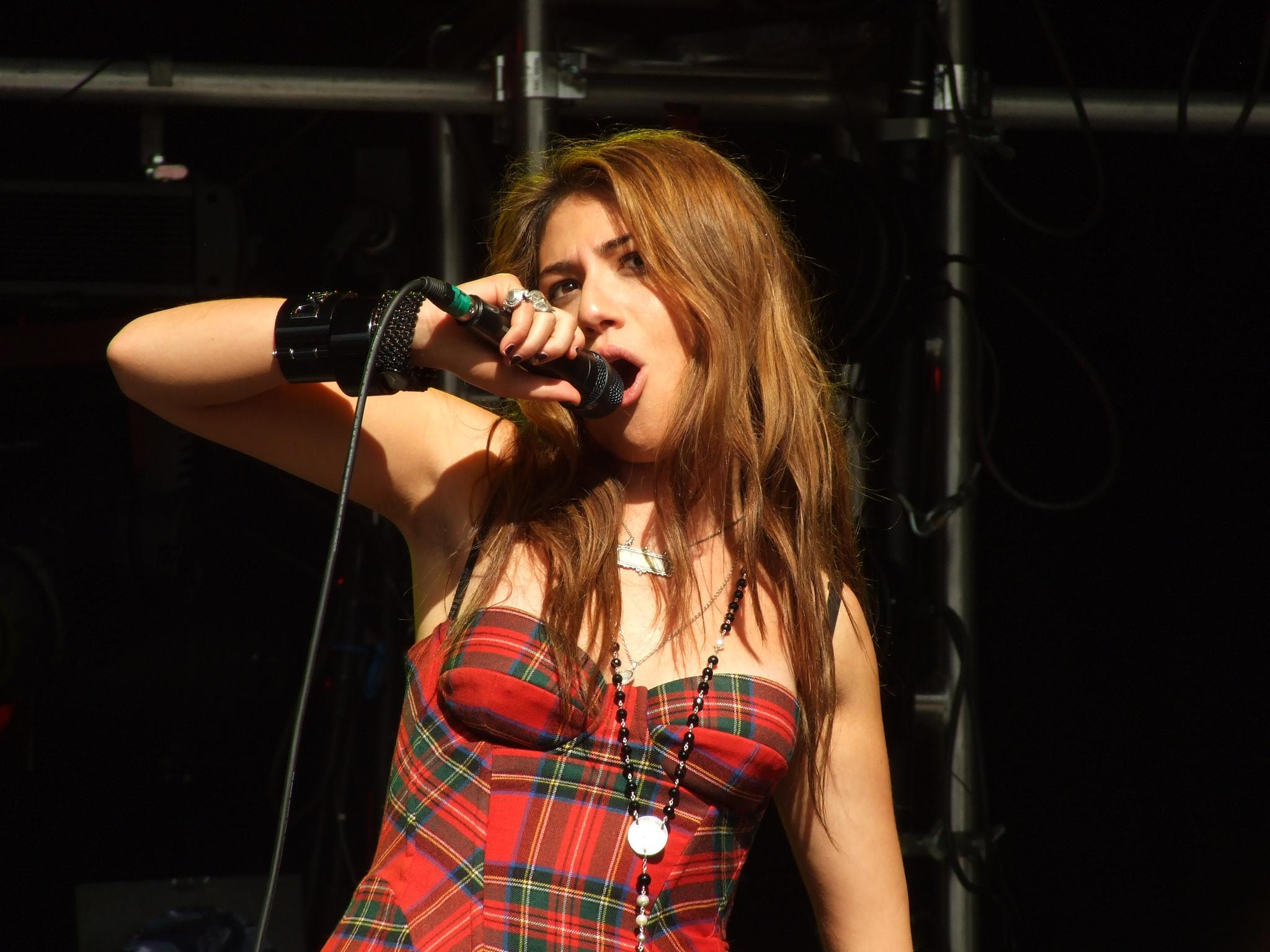
"Sweet About Me", by Gabriella Cilmi (pictured), won an ARIA Award for Best Single.

Xenomania has been given various accolades and recognition. British music industry trade magazine Music Week said in an October 2008 piece, "As one of song-writing and production team Xenomania, the publicity shy Brian Higgins has been responsible for some of the most life-affirming and innovative pop songs of the last decade." They were named Music Week's Producer of the Year award for 2009. Higgins won the Ivor Novello Award for Best Song Musically and Lyrically for his work on Cher's "Believe"; it was also awarded the sales-based International Hit of the Year and Best Selling UK Single. It also won the Grammy Award for Best Dance Recording. Xenomania won Best British Single for Girls Aloud's "The Promise" at the 2009 BRIT Awards, while Gabriella Cilmi's "Sweet About Me" won Best Single at the ARIA Music Awards of 2009. Pet Shop Boys' Yes was nominated in the Best Electronic/Dance Album category at the 52nd Grammy Awards.

The Observer placed Higgins at number thirteen in a 2008 list of the twenty most powerful "celebrity makers." The article labelled Xenomania "not only UK pop's most successful songwriting and production team, they're also its most cutting edge." Miranda Cooper was in Harper's Bazaar Power List 2007 as one of the thirty "women who shape our lives today". They wrote of Cooper, "If it's a hit you want, you'd better talk to Cooper. For the rest of us, Cooper has the power to get a tune inside our heads."

== List of artists with songs produced by Brian Higgins/Xenomania ==
- Abs
- Alesha Dixon
- Alex Gardner
- Annie
- Bananarama
- Cher
- Chicane
- Dannii Minogue
- Frank
- Florrie
- Gabriella Cilmi
- Girls Aloud
- The Gossip
- Jem
- Jessie Malakouti
- Kaiser Chiefs
- Kevin McHale
- Kylie Minogue
- Lene Nystrøm Rasted
- Little Mix
- Mania
- Melanie Blatt
- Mini Viva
- Mollie King
- Moonbaby
- Nadine Coyle
- Natacha Atlas
- Pet Shop Boys
- Rachel Stevens
- Rebecca Ferguson
- Saint Etienne
- The Saturdays
- Sophie Ellis-Bextor
- Sugababes
- Texas
- V
- Vanilla
- Vagabond
- The Wanted

== Artists signed to Xenomania ==
- Amelia Lily (2012–2014)
- CuteBad (2022–2023)
- Florrie (2010-present)
- Mini Viva (2008–2010)
- Nadine Coyle (2019–present)
