= What Are You Waiting For? (The Saturdays song) =

Single by The Saturdays

from the album Finest Selection: The Greatest Hits
- B-side: "When Love Takes Over"
- Released: 10 August 2014
- Recorded: 2013
- Genre: EDM; electropop; dance-pop
- Length: 3:28
- Label: Fascination; Polydor
- Songwriters: Uzoechi Emenike; Carla Marie Williams; Annie Yuill; Tim Deal; Brian Higgins; Miranda Cooper; Tove Nilsson; Luke Fritton; Matt Gray; Gavin Harris; Nick Hill; Toby Scott
- Producer: Xenomania

The Saturdays singles chronology
| "Not Giving Up" (2014) | "What Are You Waiting For?" (2014) |

Music video
- "What Are You Waiting For?" on YouTube

What Are You Waiting For? is a song by British-Irish girl group The Saturdays. It was co-written by MNEK (credited under his real name Uzoechi Emenike), Carla Marie Williams, Annie Rose Yuill (credited as Annie Yuill), Tim Deal, Brian Higgins, Miranda Cooper, Tove Lo (credited as Tove Nilsson), Luke Fritton, Matt Gray, Gavin Harris, Nick Hill and Toby Scott, and produced by Xenomania and Higgins. It was released on 10 August 2014, as the lead and only single from the group's first compilation album, Finest Selection: The Greatest Hits (2014) and was the group's last single before their hiatus.

The song charted at number 38 in the UK, making it their lowest-charting single to date. However, it peaked at number 25 on the Official UK Sales Chart and number 31 on the Downloads Chart. Consequently, the song became their seventeenth top 20 hit in Scotland and eighteenth consecutive UK Top 40 single.

== Music video ==
The music video was filmed in Rhodes, Greece. The video shows the group partying whilst holidaying at a resort. Speaking to Capital FM, Frankie Sandford said,

It was [The Saturdays'] first two-day video shoot which was cool. We got to go away to Rhodes with First Choice, which was great. It just so happens the one that we had to shoot on the beach was stretched over two days, which was no bad thing!

The video was released on 29 June 2014. Capital FM reviewed the video positively and called it a "serious scorcher."

== Critical reception ==
The song received generally positive reviews from music critics and fans alike. Lewis Corner of Digital Spy found the song to be generic, but hugely enjoyable. He gave the song 3.5 stars out of 5, and commented the song "is dazzling LOL-pop with a brilliantly electrifying chorus, pose-worthy drops and suitably obvious lyrics about having the time of your life." Tina Campbell of Metro said it was "enough to make you want a girlie [sic] holiday, like, right now."

== Track listings ==
CD single

(Released 11 Aug 2014)

1. "What Are You Waiting For?" – 3:25
2. "When Love Takes Over" – 3:51
3. "Greatest Hits Megamix" – 7:41
4. "What Are You Waiting For?" (LuvBug Radio Edit) – 3:18

Digital download

(Released 10 Aug 2014)

1. "What Are You Waiting For?" – 3:25

Digital EP

(Released 10 Aug 2014)

1. "What Are You Waiting For?" (LuvBug Radio Edit) – 3:18
2. "When Love Takes Over" – 3:51
3. "Greatest Hits Megamix" – 7:41
4. "What Are You Waiting For?" (The Alias Radio Edit) – 3:40
5. "Greatest Hit Megamix (Video)" – 7:47 Pre-Order Only

The Remixes EP

(Released 10 Aug 2014)

1. "What Are You Waiting For?" (Belanger Club Mix) – 4:35
2. "What Are You Waiting For?" (LuvBug Club Mix) – 4:32
3. "What Are You Waiting For?" (The Alias Club Mix) – 5:22

Revamped Version

1. "What Are You Waiting For?" – 3:25
2. "When Love Takes Over" – 3:51
3. "Greatest Hits Megamix" – 7:41
4. "What Are You Waiting For?" (LuvBug Radio Edit) – 3:18
5. "What Are You Waiting For?" (The Alias Radio Edit) – 3:40
6. "What Are You Waiting For?" (Belanger Club Mix) – 4:35
7. "What Are You Waiting For?" (LuvBug Club Mix) – 4:32
8. "What Are You Waiting For?" (The Alias Club Mix) – 5:22

== Charts ==
| Chart (2014) | Peak position |
|---|---|
| Ireland (IRMA) | 89 |
| Scottish Singles Sales (Official Charts) | 12 |
| UK Singles (Official Charts) | 38 |

== Release history ==
| Country | Date | Format | Label |
|---|---|---|---|
| Ireland | 10 August 2014 | Digital download | Polydor Ltd. (UK) |
| United Kingdom | 10 August 2014 | Digital download | Polydor Ltd. (UK) |
