= Healing Out of Spite =

2024 EP by Catty

EP by Catty
- Released: 18 October 2024
- Genre: Pop rock
- Length: 22:41
- Label: AWAL
- Producer: Barns Noble; Nathan Challinor; Ben Lythe; Geth

Catty chronology
Healing Out of Spite (2024)	Bracing for Impact (2025)

Singles from Healing Out of Spite
- 1. "I Dated a Monster" Released: 1 March 2024; 2. "Healing Out of Spite" Released: 12 April 2024; 3. "I Wish I Gave You Hell" Released: 14 June 2024; 4. "Actress" Released: 13 September 2024

Healing Out of Spite is the debut extended play by Welsh singer and songwriter Catty. It was released on 18 October 2024 through AWAL. It was preceded by four singles: "I Dated a Monster", which interpolates "Monster" by Welsh band the Automatic, title track "Healing Out of Spite", "I Wish I Gave You Hell" and "Actress".

The EP is primarily a pop rock record and its lyrical content explores themes of sapphic love, breakups, bad exes and self-confidence. Catty stated that upon people's first listen, they would mainly hear themes of anger, but clarified that despite being an angry record, that was her way of healing. The title track saw Catty's first chart placement, with it peaking at number 77 on the UK Singles Chart. "Healing Out of Spite" was also nominated for the Popjustice £20 Music Prize.

== Background and release ==
In 2016, Catty began her professional music career in the musical duo Dusky Grey, alongside Gethin Williams. The pair lived within 20 minutes of each other in Wales, but met each other on Facebook and began performing together. They were signed to Warner Records and began releasing music together, as well as releasing their own solo projects. Since the COVID-19 pandemic, they have each solely worked on their own projects due to being dropped by the label.

In 2021, Catty released her debut single, "Bella Donna". The title was inspired by the 1981 album by Stevie Nicks. Whilst releasing music, she has worked as a waitress and barista to raise funds, which she has stated that she is not ashamed of as an independent artist. Catty then continued releasing various singles. On 1 March 2024, she released the song "I Dated a Monster" as the lead single from Healing Out of Spite.

== Composition ==
Healing Out of Spite is a pop rock record, with lyrical content centered around sapphic love, breakups, bad exes and self-confidence. Catty also mentions her cancelled Vegas wedding in the EP. She explained that when people first listen to the EP, they would mainly hear themes of anger. Although she admitted it has "a venomous flare", she clarified that it is an EP about healing. She added: "It's just that sometimes [healing] looks like reconnecting with nature and meditating but sometimes that looks like cussing someone out and letting them go."

The EP begins with an intro that interpolates Catty's debut single, "Bella Donna". It transitions into "I Dated a Monster", which interpolates "Monster" by Welsh band the Automatic. The track's lyrics delve into looking back on a past relationship and realising she dated an awful person. It was described as an "ominous goth-pop" song and a "menacing alt-pop knockout". The third track, "I Wish I Gave You Hell", is an "acidic pop-punk" song in which Catty sings about wishing she had been less gracious after a breakup. "Actress" marks the fourth track on Healing Out of Spite and was likened to 1980s rock music, with tinges of country rock and modern pop. It was described as a "furious ode about an ex" that incorporates a strong guitar line.

Catty spoke about the fifth track, "I Gotta Be Cool", in an interview with Gaydio. She had a bad breakup where she did not remain on good terms with her ex, after which she wrote the song with Ben Lythe. She explained: "I didn't wanna be angry and I didn't wanna be sad, I just wanted to be okay". She noted that she did not want to dwell on her feelings on the relationship and instead wanted to focus on making songs, since she knew she would always have music. Catty wrote the title track, which also acts as the final song on the project, with Barnaby Cox and Dani Sylvia. Cox also acted as the producer for the song, credited under Barns Noble, his producer name. Of the song, she told the Official Charts Company: "I was in the car with Dani and I was talking about the music industry; how I feel like I'm good enough to do this, but nobody else does. It was so frustrating, but I knew I had to do it by myself. I will f*cking die trying. The song is about that; relationships, the music industry... I am healing, but I am doing it purely out of spite. I want everyone who ever said 'she's not good enough' to eat their words." It was described as "Carly Rae Jepsen meeting Muna at a lesbian bar".

== Reception ==
DIY magazine described the EP as "irresistibly catchy without being basic, and empowering without being twee". "Healing Out of Spite", the title track, saw Catty attain her first chart placement. It debuted and peaked at number 77 on the UK Singles Chart. The song was also nominated for the Popjustice £20 Music Prize.

== Track listing ==
Bracing for Impact track listing
No.	Title	Writer(s)	Producer(s)	Length
1.	"Bella Donna (Intro)"	Catrin Hopkins; Jim Eliot; Barnaby Cox	Barns Noble	0:53
2.	"I Dated a Monster"	Hopkins; Alexander Pennie; Iwan Griffiths; James Frost; Robin Harry Hawkins	Barns Noble	3:59
3.	"I Wish I Gave You Hell"	Hopkins; Nathan Challinor; Juliette Edward	Challinor	3:39
4.	"Actress"	Hopkins; Ben Lythe	Lythe	3:14
5.	"Reminders of Your Love (Demo)"	Hopkins; Gethin Llwyd Williams	Geth	3:35
6.	"I Gotta Be Cool"	Hopkins; Lythe	Lythe	3:29
7.	"Healing Out of Spite"	Hopkins; Cox; Dani Sylvia	Barns Noble	3:48
Total length:				22:41
