= One Touch (Mini Viva song) =

Single by Mini Viva
- Released: 9 May 2010
- Genre: Dance-pop; synth-pop
- Length: 3:50
- Label: Polydor; Geffen
- Songwriter(s): Brian Higgins; Miranda Cooper; Brittaney Love; Frankee Connolly; Tim Powell; Florrie; Lisa James; Carla Marie Williams
- Producer(s): Brian Higgins; Xenomania

Mini Viva singles chronology
"I Wish" (2009)	"One Touch" (2010)

Music video
- "One Touch" on YouTube

"One Touch" is a song by English female pop duo Mini Viva, written and produced by Brian Higgins and his production team Xenomania. The song was released as Mini Viva's third and final single on 9 May 2010. Remixes from Wideboys, Christian TV and Tom Neville were also commissioned. The single failed to make the UK top 100.

== Background ==
The duo premiered the song at the Jazz Café in Camden Town on 9 February 2010, then known as "Do You Want a Candy?". They later changed the title to "One Touch" because rapper Aggro was releasing a song around the same time featuring Kimberly Wyatt entitled "Candy".

Popjustice gave a one-minute preview of the studio version of the song on 2 March 2010.

The song was originally to be released on CD but was later designated as download only, except for promotional CDs.

== Critical reception ==
Digital Spy music reporter Robert Copsey gave "One Touch" five out of five stars, stating:

After a quivering, '80s-ish intro, Britt and Frankee get straight down to the dirty, teasing: "Do you want a candy? Hey baby! / With a different taste?" without so much as a flinch or giggle from either of them. Thankfully, the cheeky lyrics are backed by a typically infectious Xenomania production boasting struttable synths, loads of "whooosh!" effects and a chorus as moreish as a bag of Haribo Tangfastics. We may have waited five months for it, but the result is a fool-proof pop stomper that should return the pair to their rightful place at the top of the charts.

Fraser McAlpine of the BBC Chart Blog, while pointing out the risqué nature of the lyrics, wrote that the song is "stuffed full of chuntering synthy goodness, whooshy noises, the occasional robo-harmony (tastefully done, for a change), all the things we have come to recognise as key ingredients in a good pop song."

== Music video ==
The music video was filmed 17 March 2010 and premiered on 30 March 2010. Some behind-the-scenes footage was uploaded onto the duo's official YouTube channel on 19 March 2010. The video consists of the girls in a room sitting down on a sofa as well as dancing, and the girls in another room with large candies and sweets.

== Live performances ==
The duo performed "One Touch" at the Jazz Café in Camden Town on 9 February 2010, where the song was premiered. They also performed the single on the Channel 4 music show Koko Pop on 1 May 2010 and on the BBC television programme Blue Peter on 4 May 2010.

== Track listing ==
UK iTunes EP

1. "One Touch" (Radio Edit) – 3:47
2. "One Touch" (Wideboys Stadium Full Club Mix) – 5:14
3. "One Touch" (Christian TV Remix) – 4:48
4. "One Touch" (Tom Neville Remix) – 6:22

Other versions

- "One Touch" (Wideboys Radio Edit) – 3:42
- "One Touch" (Wideboys Instrumental) – 5:16

== Charts ==
Chart (2010)	Peak position
UK Singles Chart	124

== Release history ==
Country	Date	Format	Label
Ireland	7 May 2010	Digital download	Polydor, Geffen
United Kingdom	9 May 2010	Digital download	Polydor, Geffen
