= Catty (singer) =

Welsh singer (born 1997)

CATTY
- Born: Catrin Hopkins; 7 August 1997 (age 29); Caernarfon, Gwynedd, Wales
- Occupations: Singer; songwriter
- Years active: 2016–present
- Musical career
- Genres: Pop; pop rock
- Instrument: Vocals
- Formerly of: Dusky Grey

Catrin Hopkins (born 7 August 1997), known professionally as CATTY, is a Welsh singer and songwriter. She began her music career in 2016 in the musical duo Dusky Grey, before becoming a solo artist and a songwriter. Since going solo, she has released the extended plays Healing Out of Spite and Bracing for Impact, as well as supporting various artists on tour, including Dylan and Stevie Nicks.

== Early and personal life ==
Catrin Hopkins was born on 7 August 1997 in Caernarfon, Gwynedd. She was raised in Y Felinheli and attended Ysgol Syr Hugh Owen. When asked when her first connection to music was, she recalled being in her early teens and being taken to a karaoke bar abroad whilst on holiday with her parents. She sang and received a warm reception, as well as an inner love to singing. At the aged 14, she competed in Open Mic UK, as well as performing at local festivals and fun days in her area.

CATTY is a lesbian. She has stated that growing up queer in a small Welsh town was not ideal for her and she moved to a big city in England as soon as she could. However, she has stated that when she goes back home, she feels more accepted than she did growing up. Since 2024, she has been in a relationship with I Kissed a Girl cast member Amy Spalding.

== Career ==
In 2016, Hopkins began her professional music career in the musical duo Dusky Grey, alongside Gethin Williams. The pair lived within 20 minutes of each other in Wales, but met each other on Facebook and began performing together. They were signed to Warner Records and began releasing music together, as well as releasing their own solo projects. In 2018, her song "9" received airplay from BBC Radio Cymru. Since the COVID-19 pandemic, they have each solely worked on their own projects due to being dropped by the label. In 2021, she released her debut single under the stage name CATTY. Released in April 2021, "Bella Donna" was described by Lock magazine as "a super sleek cut that hooks you in with its badass bass thuds and sublime vocals". The title was inspired by the 1981 album by Stevie Nicks. Whilst releasing music, she has worked as a waitress and barista to raise funds, which she has stated that she is not ashamed of as an independent artist.

CATTY continued releasing various singles, including "Maybe All the Rumours Are True", which was played on BBC Radio 1's Future Pop show. In 2024, she released the song "I Dated a Monster", which interpolates "Monster" by the Automatic. As well as other singles, the song was included on her debut extended play (EP), Healing Out of Spite (2024). The single of the same name became CATTY's first to chart, reaching number 77 on the Official Singles Chart in the UK. Also in July 2024, Catty supported Stevie Nicks at BST Hyde Park. With no label or agent, only herself and her manager, the pair emailed numerous contacts to attain Catty the gig, to no avail. Eventually, after sending the booking agent a voice note on Instagram, she was booked for the festival. That same year, she was also the opening act for Dylan and Beth McCarthy.

In May 2025, CATTY released the song "Joyride", described as "sapphic soundtrack of the summer" by Diva. She wrote the song partly due to a Twitter bet that she could not write a love song, wanting to prove that she could. The song was accompanied by a music video described as a sapphic twist on Thelma & Louise, starring CATTY and her girlfriend, Spalding. It was followed by the track "Prized Possession". CATTY then released the song "4am (Back in His Bed)", written about a woman who was using her as a "little play thing" during a rocky patch with her boyfriend. The songs were all featured on her six-track second EP, Bracing for Impact.. The EP also featured songs "Bracing For Impact" and TikTok sensation "Man on the Run". In 2026, CATTY released "Pavlov's Dog" - an upcoming single from her new EP.

== Artistry ==
As a child, CATTY listed Barbra Streisand and Celine Dion amongst her main influences. When in Dusky Grey, she named Fleetwood Mac as her main inspiration, one she has continued to list since. She has also named Lady Gaga, Lennon Stella, Seinabo Sey, Chappell Roan, Cher and James Dean as musical inspirations. CATTY has also been inspired by musical theatre, listing Chicago and Burlesque as influences.

== Discography ==
=== Extended plays ===
List of extended plays, with selected details
Title	Details
Healing Out of Spite	Released: 18 October 2024; Label: Independent; Format: Digital download, streaming
Bracing for Impact	Released: 24 October 2025; Label: Independent; Format: Digital download, streaming

=== Singles ===
List of singles as lead artist, with selected chart positions and certifications, showing year released and album name
Title	Year	Peak chart positions	Album
Title	Year	UK	Album
"Bella Donna"	2021	–	Healing Out of Spite
"Deep End"	2021	–	Non-album singles
"Can't Hate You Yet"	2022	–	Non-album singles
"Maybe All the Rumours Are True"	2022	–	Non-album singles
"I Don't Miss You (I Just Miss Your Mum)"	2022	–	Non-album singles
"I Dated a Monster"	2024	–	Healing Out of Spite
"Healing Out of Spite"	2024	77	Healing Out of Spite
"I Wish I Gave You Hell"	2024	–	Healing Out of Spite
"Actress"	2024	–	Healing Out of Spite
"Joyride"	2025	–	Bracing for Impact
"Prized Posession"	2025	–	Bracing for Impact
"4am (Back in His Bed)"	2025	–	Bracing for Impact
"Make You Love Me"	2025	–	Bracing for Impact
"—" denotes recording that did not chart in that territory.

=== Songwriting credits ===
List of songwriting credits for other artists, with year released and album name
Title	Year	Artist(s)	Album
"The Way I Am"	2021	Charlotte Black	Non-album singles
"One Life"	2022	This Culture	Non-album singles
"Last Day"	2023	Maz Univerze	Emo Season
"Tokyo Tornado"	2023	Cecil	Non-album single
"Good Bi"	2024	Beth McCarthy	Non-album single
"Do or Die"	2025	Grace Davies	The Wrong Side of 25

== Awards and nominations ==
Year	Organisation	Category	Nominee(s)/work(s)	Result	Ref.
2024	Popjustice	Popjustice £20 Music Prize	"Healing Out of Spite"	Nominated	
