= Bracing for Impact =

2025 EP by Catty

EP by Catty
- Released: 24 October 2025
- Recorded: 2024–2025
- Genre: Pop rock; pop
- Length: 25:45
- Label: AWAL
- Producer: David Challinor

Catty chronology
Healing Out of Spite (2024)	Bracing for Impact (2025)

Singles from Bracing for Impact
- 1. "Joyride" Released: 9 May 2025; 2. "Prized Possession" Released: 8 August 2025; 3. "4am (Back in His Bed)" Released: 5 September 2025; 4. "Make You Love Me" Released: 10 October 2025

Bracing for Impact is the second extended play by Welsh singer and songwriter Catty. It was released on 24 October 2025 through AWAL. The lead single, "Joyride", was released in May 2025. It was followed by singles "Prized Possession", "4am (Back in His Bed)" and "Make You Love Me". Catty co-wrote the entire EP with Juliette Edward and Nathan Challinor; Challinor also produced every track.

Catty was inspired by musical theatre productions including Chicago throughout the EP, as well as Kate Bush, Stevie Nicks and Meat Loaf. Bracing for Impact saw Catty depart from writing breakup songs; the lyrical content instead explores themes of queer love, desire, pain, discovery of feelings, resilience and hope. It was praised for being "a total embodiment of queer life".

== Background and release ==
Catty released her debut extended play (EP), Healing Out of Spite, in October 2024. The EP saw Catty attain her first chart placement, with its title track, "Healing Out of Spite", reaching number 77 on the Official Singles Chart in the UK. Following the EP's release, Diva labelled her "one of the most exciting new artists to follow". After Healing Out of Spite, Catty toured with various artists as their support act.

When asked about the difference between her first EP and Bracing for Impact, Catty said that the budget difference was noticeable. She released her debut project completely independently, while Bracing for Impact was released under AWAL. She had previously worked as a barista to fund her music, but this EP saw her receive a budget to bring "the vision to life". It was released on 24 October 2025; upon its release, Catty exclaimed that since the songs were written long before their release, they "they don’t feel new and shiny" to her, and confirmed she was already working on her next musical project. However, she enjoyed that the songs felt "sparkly" again with people listening to them upon release.

== Composition ==
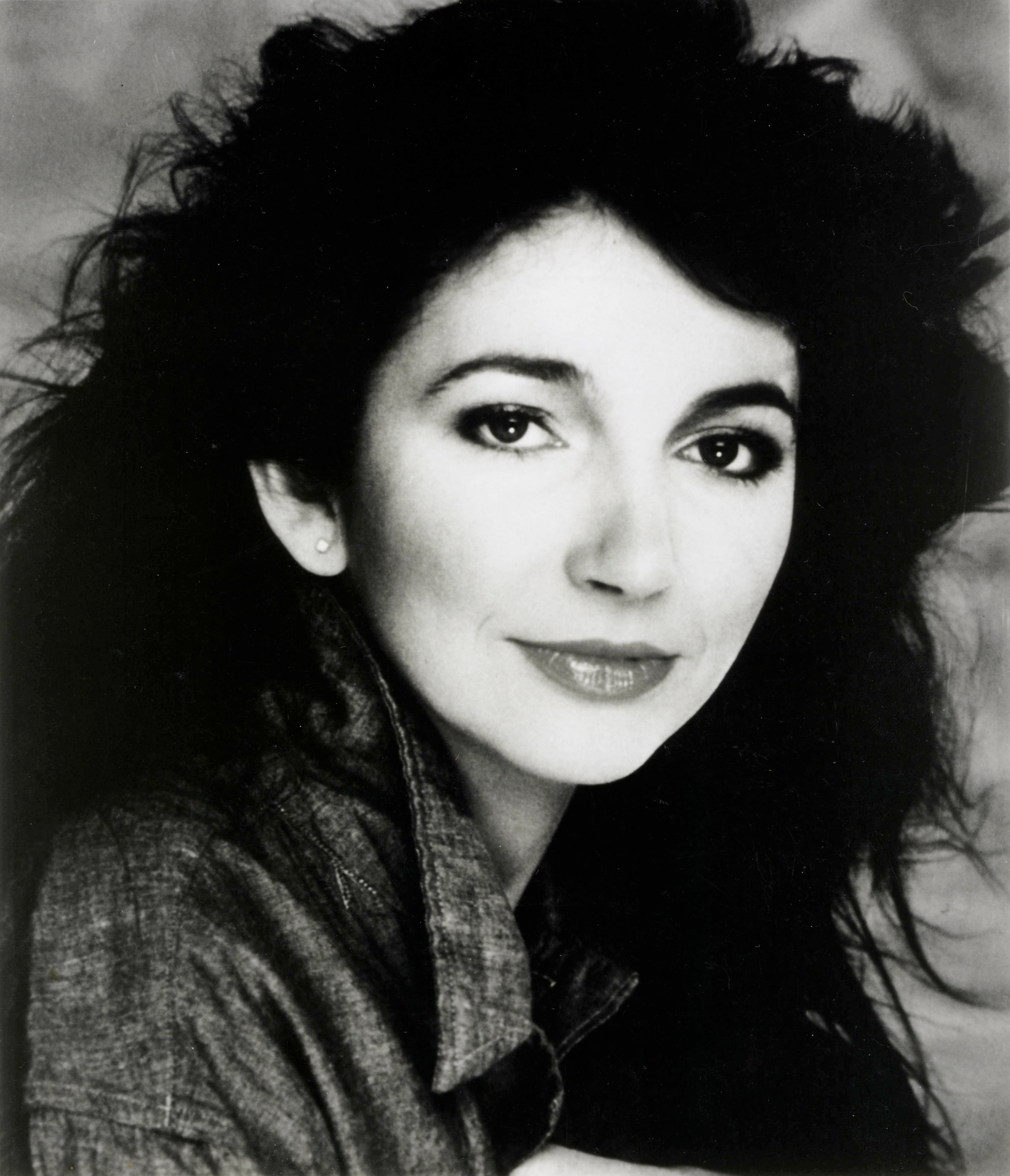
Catty was inspired by Kate Bush throughout the project.

Catty described Bracing for Impact as "What if Kate Bush watched Chicago?" Catty had long been a fan of theatrical music, as well as being inspired by Jim Steinman, Bonnie Tyler and Meat Loaf, and wanted to fuse the sounds. She co-wrote each track on the EP alongside Juliette Edward and Nathan Challinor; Challinor also produced every song. The EP saw Catty depart from writing songs about breakups due to her relationship with girlfriend Amy Spalding. She exclaimed to Edward and Challinor: "I don't think I'm going to write a good song ever again" since she felt reliant on breakup music.

The lyrical content of Bracing for Impact explores themes of queer love, desire, pain, discovery of feelings, resilience and hope. When asked what she hoped listeners would take away, Catty stated that she had made the project completely for herself. She explained: "the only thing I really thought about while making it is: am I enjoying this? Are my co-writers enjoying this? Are we proud of it?" She then clarified that what she had taken from it was: "life is extremely short and extremely long, falling in love is beautiful and disgusting, grief, heartbreak, love and death are universal. Strap in, strap on, brace for impact".

Alongside Edward and Challinor, Catty wrote "Joyride", which she has stated shaped the rest of the EP, including its name. On the numerous driving themes made throughout Bracing for Impact, she joked that it was "a whole lot of driving references for someone who is too gay to drive". "Joyride", which became the opening track, was written about not feeling secure with someone romantically, but wanting to go along with it for the thrill. It was described as a "baroque-pop-rock" song. "Prized Possession", the second single, is also the second track on the EP. It was described by Clash as a "thunderous, bloodstained plea for love that feels ripped from the pages of a gothic fairytale". As with "Joyride" and Catty's motive for the EP, it sees her continue to be dramatic. Of the track, she said: "[It] is basically me saying if you're in love with me, kill the rest (metaphorically, of course.) I love with every fibre of my being, oftentimes to my detriment but 'Prized Possession' is definitely me saying please love me with everything you have in return".

"Make You Love Me" follows, which Catty described as "casting a little spell" to make a woman love her forever. It was likened to Bush and Stevie Nicks, who Catty confirmed as an inspiration. It was billed as a "slickly produced, pulsating pop tune". "4am (Back in His Bed)", a dark pop song with "pulsing beats and atmospheric production", marked the fourth song on the EP. It was described as a "long-lost Robyn banger". The song's lyrical content revolves around Catty being a woman's "little play thing while she figured out if she liked her boyfriend or not". She remarked that the song is very sad, except for the lyric "eating me out when you've got food at home", which Catty found hilarious. Described by Dork as the "odd one out", it marks the one song on Bracing for Impact not written about Catty's latest relationship.

"Bracing for Impact", the title track from the EP, is another rock pop song. On its meaning, Catty stated: "I think I lived a year of my life trying to protect myself so much that I forgot to live. This is basically me saying yeah, I'm shit scared of failing, I'm shit scared of getting hurt, I'm shit scared of no happy ending but I do owe myself a life". The closing track on the EP, "Man on the Run", is a "golden-era ballad". The song was almost excluded from the EP, of which Catty said: "We had the entire verse, pre, and chorus in one voice memo, and I thought it was shit. Nathan and Juliette texted me after and made me listen to it again. I remember thinking: You stupid bitch, get back into the studio right now and finish that song".

== Critical reception ==
Bracing for Impact was said to represent "a total embodiment of queer life, capturing the euphoria, bruises and ache of her personal experience — but while pulling at something profoundly universal". Clash described the EP as a "dose of honesty" and appreciated the entertaining sonics, as well as its "ultra-colourful singles". Comparing the EP to its predecessor, Healing Out of Spite, Dork billed it a "whiplash-sharp follow-up".

== Track listing ==
Bracing for Impact track listing
No.	Title	Writer(s)	Producer(s)	Length
1.	"Joyride"	Catrin Hopkins; Juliette Edward; Nathan Challinor	Challinor	4:44
2.	"Prized Possession"	Hopkins; Edward; Challinor	Challinor	4:11
3.	"Make You Love Me"	Hopkins; Edward; Challinor	Challinor	4:24
4.	"4am (Back in His Bed)"	Hopkins; Edward; Challinor	Challinor	3:58
5.	"Bracing for Impact"	Hopkins; Edward; Challinor	Challinor	3:14
6.	"Man on the Run"	Hopkins; Edward; Challinor	Challinor	5:11
Total length:				25:45
