= Mini Viva =

English pop duo

- Origin: London, England
- Genres: Pop; dance-pop; synth-pop
- Years active: 2008–2010
- Labels: Geffen; Polydor
- Past members: Frankee Connolly; Britt Love

Mini Viva were an English pop duo formed in 2008 by British songwriting and production team Xenomania. They were managed by 19 Entertainment and signed to Geffen and Polydor Records. Consisting of Frankee Connolly and Britt Love, the duo were due to release their debut album in 2010. Despite a successful first single and positive reviews, the group failed to gain further traction and confirmed their split in late 2010. They released three singles and toured in support of acts including the Saturdays and Diversity.

== History ==
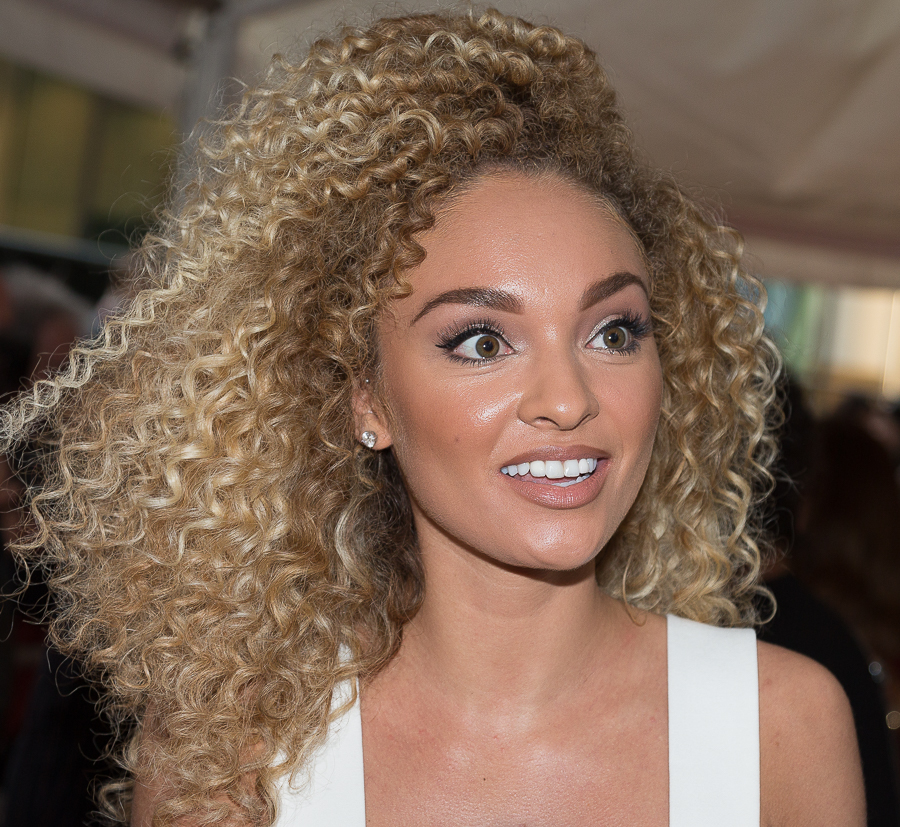
Frankee Connolly at the Glamour Women of the Year Awards 2015

Mini Viva were formed by Xenomania in 2008, when Frankee Connolly and Britt Love attended an audition held by a label called Select Music UK. Xenomania took the duo to their headquarters in Kent, and they spent a year working with the production team before their launch. They were signed to Universal Music Group in May 2009, after performing "Left My Heart in Tokyo" in the office of Universal chairman and CEO Lucian Grainge.

Mini Viva supported The Saturdays on their The Work Tour in 2009. The Guardian featured the duo as the "New Band of the Day" on 17 July 2009. They released their debut single, "Left My Heart in Tokyo", in September 2009. Produced by Xenomania, the song was named "the catchiest single of 2009" by NME magazine. It reached number seven on the UK Singles Chart, becoming the highest-charting single of the duo's career.

In a BBC Radio 1 interview they said they had been inspired by Rihanna and Lady Gaga. The duo's second single, "I Wish", was released in December 2009 and peaked at number seventy-three on the UK Singles Chart, spending one week on the chart. In March 2010, Mini Viva began an interactive webcast reality show entitled Viva Mini Viva. In one episode, they said their debut album was to be released in late 2010 and confirmed the album was not titled Colloquial Obsession, as was rumoured at the time. The third single "One Touch", released in May 2010, only managed to chart at number 124. During this period, they supported the dance troupe Diversity on their UK tour.

It was reported in July 2010 that although the duo's future was unclear, they were still signed to Geffen Records. However, in November 2010, Mini Viva confirmed speculation that they were splitting up, explaining that "sometimes things just don't work out the way you would like them to".

As of February 2012, Love and Connolly were working on their solo careers. Love was featured on "You Don't Want to Dance with Me" by English electronic duo Monarchy and auditioned for the ninth series of The X Factor in 2012. She was successful in getting to bootcamp, but failed to make it to judges' houses. Frankee later became a part of the all-female trio M.O, whose single "Who Do You Think Of?" reached number eighteen on the UK chart in August 2016. She left the group in June 2017, and was replaced by Chanal Benjilali.

== Discography ==
=== Extended plays ===
List of EPs, with selected details
Title	Details
Engine Room Session	Released: 14 December 2009; Label: Polydor; Format: Digital download

=== Singles ===
Title	Year	Peak chart positions		
Title	Year	UK	FIN	IRE
"Left My Heart in Tokyo"	2009	7	7	23
"I Wish"	2009	73	—	67
"One Touch"	2010	124	—	—
"—" denotes a recording that did not chart or was not released in that territory.

== Tours ==
As supporting act

- 2009: The Saturdays – The Work Tour (select dates)
- 2009: Cascada – Clubland Live Tour #3
- 2010: Diversity – UK tour

== Filmography ==
Year	Title	Role	Notes
2010	Viva Mini Viva	Themselves	Interactive online reality show
