= I Wish (Mini Viva song) =

Single by Mini Viva
- Released: 14 December 2009
- Genre: Dance-pop; synth-pop
- Length: 4:10
- Label: Polydor; Geffen
- Songwriter(s): Miranda Cooper; Brian Higgins; Tim Powell; Owen Parker; Lisa Cowling; Morgan Mackintosh
- Producer(s): Brian Higgins; Xenomania

Mini Viva singles chronology
"Left My Heart in Tokyo" (2009)	"I Wish" (2009)	"One Touch" (2010)

"I Wish" is a single by English pop duo Mini Viva, written and produced by Brian Higgins and his production team Xenomania. The song was released as Mini Viva's second single in December 2009. The promo single of "I Wish" contains remixes by Cahill and Paul Harris.

On 15 December 2009, "I Wish" reached number 64 on the UK iTunes Store's Top 200.

== Live performance ==
The song was performed on The Hollyoaks Music Show in November 2009.

== Critical performance ==
Popjustice listed the song as "Song of The Day" and gave the track review

Mini Viva's 'Left My Heart In Tokyo' is one of 2009's signature pop tunes and Mini Viva pull it out of the bag again with the wistfully romantic 'I Wish'.

To these ears it's one of the best tunes to have come out of Westerham since 'Call The Shots' and it shares that song's uptempo/downcast discoballad qualities. 'I Wish' also comes equipped with one of the year's most delicate and glittery middle eights.

Splendid stuff.

Nick Levine of Digital Spy Chart Blog gave the song a positive review stating:

After hearing 'Left My Heart In Tokyo', the brilliant debut single from Mini Viva, lots of pop fans felt the Xenomania-signed, developed and produced duo might fill the Girls Aloud-shaped hole in HMV this Autumn. Sadly, in recognition of the fact that the Christmas release slates are crowded enough already and the only X Factor appearance they're likely to bag is a spot between Gordon Smart and Sinitta over on the ITV2 show, it's been pushed back until next year.

Consolation, however, comes in the form of their follow-up single. 'I Wish' is a misty-eyed disco-pop nugget, full of regret and longing, whose irresistible chorus has just the right hint of the Vengaboys to it. Britt and Frankee, meanwhile, display just as much lively vocal charm as they did first time out. Of course, this is only likely to make you crave that Long-Player more, but as your mum used to say when you asked for a dollop of Angel Delight before you finished your fishfingers and chips, all good things... The song was awarded a 4 star.

== Music video ==
The music video was directed by Ray Kay, who also directed their debut single "Left My Heart in Tokyo". The video features the girls walking through Los Angeles with colourful lights on the buildings around them.

== Chart performance ==
Released on 3 December 2009 in Ireland, the single peaked at number 67. It later entered the UK Singles Chart on 20 December 2009 at #73 and Scottish Singles Chart at 60.

Chart (2009)	Peak position
Ireland (IRMA)	67
UK Singles (OCC)	73

== Release history ==
Region	Date	Format	Label
Ireland	3 December 2009	Digital download	Polydor/Geffen
United Kingdom	13 December 2009	Digital download	Polydor/Geffen
United Kingdom	14 December 2009	CD single	Polydor/Geffen
