= Left My Heart in Tokyo =

2009 single by Mini Viva

Single by Mini Viva
- Released: 6 September 2009
- Genre: Dance-pop; synth-pop
- Length: 3:49
- Label: Polydor; Geffen
- Songwriter(s): Miranda Cooper; Brian Higgins; Annie; Fred Falke; Carla Marie Williams
- Producer(s): Brian Higgins; Xenomania

Mini Viva singles chronology
"Left My Heart in Tokyo" (2009)	"I Wish" (2009)

Audio sample
- file; help

Music video
- "Left My Heart in Tokyo" on YouTube

"Left My Heart in Tokyo" is a song by English pop duo Mini Viva, co-written by Norwegian singer Annie and French remixer Fred Falke and produced by Brian Higgins and his production team Xenomania. The song was released as Mini Viva's debut single on 6 September 2009. NME called the song "the catchiest single of 2009". The single was originally released as a 10-inch vinyl single in December 2008 on World's Finest Records, featuring two mixes by Fred Falke.

== Critical reception ==
Nick Levine of Digital Spy gave the song four out of five stars, stating, "Make no mistake, their debut single sounds like a chart invader. With its swooning chorus, inventive, disco-tinged production and lyrics that sound great even when they don't quite make sense, 'Left My Heart in Tokyo' is vintage Xenomania." Fraser McAlpine of BBC's "Chart Blog" also rated the song four out of five stars and wrote, "What sets this apart from other generic acts of dance-pop [...] is the infectious energy that singers Frankee and Britt bring to it: whether it's snarling out the verses, purring the bridge, or vamping the chorus, I can't help thinking that recording this single sounds like it was a lot of fun, and it's the sort of fun that they're generously passing on to all of our ears." The song was placed on BBC Radio 1's A-list.

== Track listings ==
- UK 10-inch single (catalogue number WFR10 001)
1. "Left My Heart in Tokyo" (Fred Falke Dub)
2. "Left My Heart in Tokyo" (Fred Falke Instrumental)
- UK digital download
1. "Left My Heart in Tokyo" (Radio Edit)
- UK CD single
1. "Left My Heart in Tokyo" (Radio Edit)
2. "Left My Heart in Tokyo" (Chris Lake Remix)
- UK promotional CD single
1. "Left My Heart in Tokyo" (Radio Edit)
2. "Left My Heart in Tokyo" (Treasure Fingers Remix)
3. "Left My Heart in Tokyo" (Acid Girls Remix)
4. "Left My Heart in Tokyo" (Pete Hammond Contemporary Remix)
5. "Left My Heart in Tokyo" (Pete Hammond Retro Remix)
6. "Left My Heart in Tokyo" (Chris Lake Remix)
7. "Left My Heart in Tokyo" (Kush Dub Remix)
8. "Left My Heart in Tokyo" (Spog Remix)

== Charts ==
=== Weekly charts ===
Weekly chart performance for "Left My Heart in Tokyo"
Chart (2009)	Peak position
Finland (Suomen virallinen lista)	7
Hungary (Editors' Choice Top 40)	15
Ireland (IRMA)	23
Scotland (OCC)	15
UK Singles (OCC)	7

=== Year-end charts ===
Year-end chart performance for "Left My Heart in Tokyo"
Chart (2009)	Position
UK Singles (OCC)	133
