= Carla Marie Williams =

Songwriter and singer

Carla Marie Williams MBE
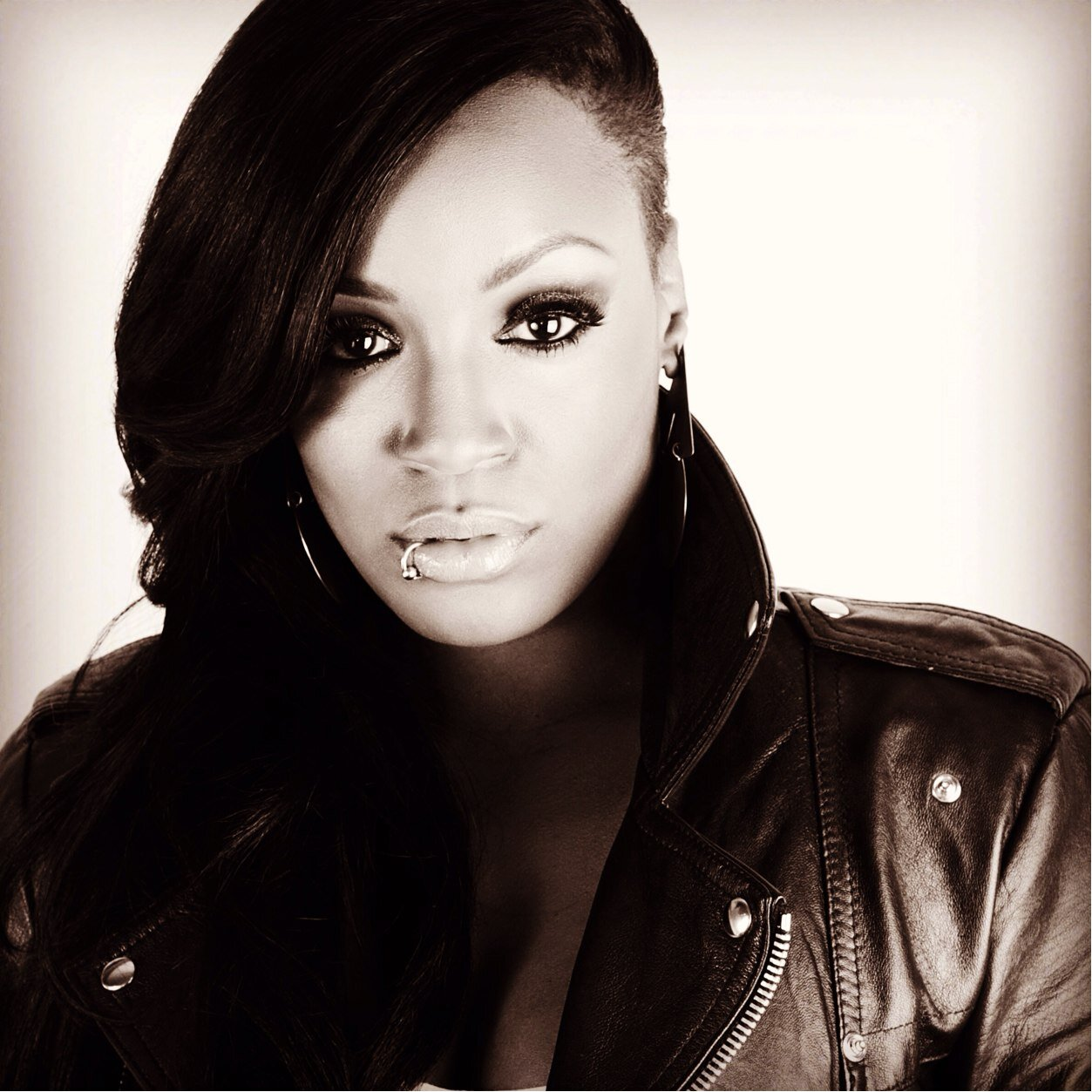
- Born: Harrow, London
- Occupations: Songwriter, singer, producer

Carla Maria Williams MBE, known professionally as Carla Marie Williams, is a British songwriter and singer. Notable songs she has written or co-written include Beyoncé's "Freedom", Naughty Boy's "Runnin'" and Britney Spears's "Private Show". In 2016, Williams was nominated for two Grammy Awards for her work on Beyoncé's Lemonade album. She is the founder of Girls I Rate.

== Early life ==
Williams grew up in Wealdstone Harrow, London, England. At the age of 10, she formed the girl group the Likkle Mentions. They entered local singing competitions and appeared on local radio. Williams completed her GCSEs and studied her A-Levels at Bentley Wood High School, an all-girl comprehensive school in Harrow. After completing her A-Levels, she worked as a youth mentor for four years to help young musicians and songwriters.

== Career ==
Williams moved to full-time songwriting in 2006 after losing her voice from muscular tension. She was signed to Xenomania as a songwriter by Brian Higgins. Williams has written tracks for Girls Aloud, the Saturdays, Kylie Minogue and Alesha Dixon. Most notably she co-wrote Girls Aloud's "The Promise", for which she received a BRIT Award.

Since leaving Xenomania, Williams has founded her own writing collective, New Crowd Media.

Williams was appointed Member of the Order of the British Empire (MBE) in the 2024 New Year Honours for services to music.
