= List of UK Independent Singles Breakers Chart number ones of the 2010s =

This is a list of songs which have topped the UK Independent Singles Breakers Chart during the 2010s. The Independent record labels given are the ones listed by the official charts.

== Number ones ==
Key
No.	nth single to top the UK Independent Singles Breakers Chart
re	Return of a single to number one

No.	Artist (Note: The artist, single, date of reaching number one and number of weeks at number one are those given by the Official Charts Company.)	Single	Record label	Reached number one (Week ending)	Weeks at number one
2010
re	The Big Pink	"Dominos"	4AD	2 January 2010	3
re	Duck Sauce	"aNYway"	Data	23 January 2010	1
13	Sub Focus	"Could This Be Real"	RAM	30 January 2010	1
14	The Midnight Beast	"Tik Tok (Parody)"	The Midnight Beast	6 February 2010	1
15	Danny Byrd featuring Liquid	"Sweet Harmony"	Hospital	13 February 2010	2
16	Remady	"No Superstar"	Maelstrom	27 February 2010	1
17	Giggs featuring B.o.B	"Don't Go There"	XL	6 March 2010	2
18	General Fiasco	"Ever So Shy"	Infectious	20 March 2010	1
19	Rox	"My Baby Left Me"	Rough Trade	27 March 2010	1
20	Sarah Phillips	"Autumn (Tribute to Debbie Phillips)"	Bacon Empire	3 April 2010	1
21	All Time Low	"Lost In Stereo"	Hopeless	10 April 2010	2
22	Half Man Half Biscuit	"Joy Division Oven Gloves"	Probe Plus	17 April 2010	1
re	All Time Low	"Lost In Stereo"	Hopeless	24 April 2010	2
23	Race for Life	"Girls Just Want To Have Fun"	Race for Life	8 May 2010	1
24	TV Rock featuring Rudy	"In the Air"	Data/Ministry of Sound	15 May 2010	2
25	King Blues	"Headbutt"	Transmission	29 May 2010	1
26	Justin Lee Collins	"All I Ever Want Is You"	Tiger Aspect	5 June 2010	1
27	Focus	"Hocus Pocus"	Red Bullet	12 June 2010	1
28	Giggs	"Look What the Cat Dragged In"	XL	19 June 2010	1
29	Dennis Ferrer	"Hey Hey"	Defected	26 June 2010	1
30	Marco Calliari	"We No Speak Americano"	Tycoon	3 July 2010	1
31	Israel Kamakawiwo'ole	"Somewhere Over The Rainbow"	Big Boy	10 July 2010	1
32	Frank Sidebottom	"Guess Who's Been On Match Of The Day"	Cherry Red	17 July 2010	1
33	Katie Price	"Free To Love Again"	MRP	24 July 2010	1
re	All Time Low	"Weightless"	Hopeless	31 July 2010	1
34	Radical Face	"Welcome Home"	Morr	7 August 2010	1
35	Fake Blood	"I Think I Like It"	Cheap Thrills	14 August 2010	2
36	Caspa & Mr Hudson	"Love Never Dies (Back For The First Time)"	Subsoldiers	28 August 2010	1
37	The Count & Sinden featuring Mystery Jets	"After Dark"	Domino	4 September 2010	1
38	Daithí	"Carraroe"	Must Be the Music	11 September 2010	1
39	Tensnake	"Coma Cat"	Defected	18 September 2010	3
40	Allie Moss	"Corner"	Allie Moss	9 October 2010	4
41	Sons of Admirals	"Here Comes My Baby"	Admirals	6 November 2010	1
42	Yeo Valley Boyz featuring Mr George	"Yeo Valley Rap"	Black Sheep	13 November 2010	2
43	Jamie Woon	"Night Air"	Candent Songs	27 November 2010	1
44	Beady Eye	"Bring the Light"	Beady Eye	4 December 2010	1
re	Yeo Valley Boyz featuring Mr George	"Yeo Valley Rap"	Black Sheep	11 December 2010	2
45	Avicii & Sebastian Drums	"My Feelings for You"	Vicious/All Around the World	25 December 2010	3
2011
46	Trackstarz	"Grenade"	Life Music	15 January 2011	1
re	Jamie Woon	"Night Air"	Candent Songs	22 January 2011	1
47	Manran	"Latha Math"	EmuBands	29 January 2011	1
48	Like a G6	"Like a G6"	Cover Guru	5 February 2011	1
49	Tiësto vs. Diplo and Busta Rhymes	"C'mon (Catch 'Em by Surprise)"	Wall of Sound	12 February 2011	1
50	Hype Squad	"Black and Yellow"	Secret R	19 February 2011	1
re	Tiësto vs. Diplo and Busta Rhymes	"C'mon (Catch 'Em by Surprise)"	Wall of Sound	26 February 2011	1
re	Hype Squad	"Black and Yellow"	Secret R	4 March 2011	1
51	#1 Jennifer Lopez & Pitbull	"On the Floor"	Euro Pop Covers	11 March 2011	1
52	Benjamin Francis Leftwich	"Pictures"	Dirty Hit	18 March 2011	1
53	Rebecca Black	"Friday"	Rebecca Black	25 March 2011	2
54	Justice	"Civilization"	Because Music/Ed Banger	8 April 2011	1
55	Flux Pavilion	"Bass Cannon"	Circus	15 April 2011	2
56	Sammy King	"Penny Arcade"	Mud Hut	29 April 2011	1
re	Flux Pavilion	"Bass Cannon"	Circus	6 May 2011	1
57	Toddla T featuring Shola Ama, A*M*E & J2K	"Take It Back"	Ninja Tune	13 May 2011	5
58	Woodkid	"Iron"	Green United	17 June 2011	1
59	Above Beyond/Richard Bedford	"Thing Called Love"	Anjunabeats	24 June 2011	1
60	Box Bottom featuring Big Babba	"Bounce 'n' Boom"	Bluestooth	1 July 2011	2
61	Laidback Luke & Steve Aoki	"Turbulence"	New State	15 July 2011	4
62	Jay Mya featuring Jason Quainoo	"Chasing Rainbows"	Drunken Boy	13 August 2011	1
63	Charlie Simpson	"Parachutes"	Nusic Sounds	20 August 2011	1
64	S.mouse	"Squashed Nigga"	Demon	27 August 2011	1
65	Drumsound & Bassline Smith	"Close"	New State	3 September 2011	2
66	Joe Goddard featuring Valentina	"Gabriel"	Greco-Roman	17 September 2011	3
67	Ray Foxx featuring Lovelle	"La Musica (The Trumpeter)"	Defected	8 October 2011	1
68	My Hearts a Stereo	"Stereo Hearts"	ICover	15 October 2011	1
69	Wolfgang Gartner featuring will.I.Am	"Forever"	Ministry of Sound	22 October 2011	2
70	Sneakbo	"The Wave"	Play Hard	5 November 2011	1
71	James Vincent McMorrow	"Higher Love"	Believe Digital	12 November 2011	2
re	Woodkid	"Iron"	Green United	26 November 2011	1
re	James Vincent McMorrow	"Higher Love"	Believe Digital	3 December 2011	6
2012
72	Nadia Ali	"Rapture"	Ministry of Sound	14 January 2012	1
73	M83	"Midnight City"	Naive	21 January 2012	1
74	Jme	"96 F##kries"	Boy Better Know	28 January 2012	1
re	Nadia Ali	"Rapture"	Ministry of Sound	4 February 2012	4
75	Azealia Banks featuring Lazy Jay	"212"	Azealia Banks	3 March 2012	1
76	Friction	"Led Astray"	Shogun Audio	10 March 2012	1
re	Azealia Banks featuring Lazy Jay	"212"	Azealia Banks	17 March 2012	1
77	Sniffy Dog featuring Adrienne Stiefel	"Little Boxes"	Pure Silk	24 March 2012	1
78	College featuring Electric Youth	"A Real Hero"	Valerie	31 March 2012	1
79	Carly Rae Jepsen Tribute Team	"Call Me Maybe"	TT	7 April 2012	1
80	Rainbow Mix	"We Are Young"	1st Imp	14 April 2012	2
81	Dubstep Re-mix Squad	"Too Close"	Euro Pop Covers	28 April 2012	2
82	Rachel K Collier	"Hard Road to Travel"	Qs	12 May 2012	2
83	Julia Stone	"You're the One That I Want"	Flock	26 May 2012	1
84	Dream Team	"Payphone"	TDT	2 June 2012	1
85	Can You Blow My	"Whistle"	ICover	9 June 2012	1
86	Precision Tunes	"Payphone"	PT	16 June 2012	1
87	Tiësto & Wolfgang Gartner	"We Own the Night"	Musical Freedom	23 June 2012	1
88	Jme	"Murking"	Boy Better Know	30 June 2012	1
89	US	"In the End"	US	7 July 2012	1
90	The Midnight Beast	"Begging"	Sounds Like Good	14 July 2010	2
re	Radical Face	"Welcome Home"	Morr	28 July 2012	1
91	Underworld/Dockhead Choir/Glennie	"Caliban's Dream"	Locog UMC	4 August 2012	1
92	Knife Party	"Internet Friends"	Earstorm	11 August 2012	1
93	Otto Knows	"Million Voices"	Embassy of Music	18 August 2012	1
94	Big Hits 2012	"Bom Bom"	Big Hits 2012	25 August 2012	1
re	Otto Knows	"Million Voices"	Embassy of Music	1 September 2012	1
95	Big Hits 2012	"Let Me Love You (Until You Learn to Love Yourself)"	Big Hits 2012	8 September 2012	1
re	Otto Knows	"Million Voices"	Embassy of Music	15 September 2012	1
96	John Murphy	"In The House - In a Heartbeat"	XL	22 September 2012	1
97	Ultimate Pop Hits	"Gangnam Style"	Ultimate Pop Hits	29 September 2012	1
98	Big Hits 2012	"Tea & Toast"	Big Hits 2012	6 October 2012	2
99	Woodkid	"Run Boy Run"	Green United	20 October 2012	3
100	Julio Bashmore	"Au Seve"	BroadWalk	10 November 2012	1
101	Monsta	"Holdin' On"	Owsla	17 November 2012	3
102	Jimmy Higham & Jon Walmsley	"Isn't She Lovely"	Trumpton	8 December 2012	3
103	Eddie Stobart Truckers	"12 Days of Christmas"	Shine	29 December 2012	2
2013
104	Ilan Eshkeri & Andy Burrows	"Light the Night"	Play It Again Sam	12 January 2013	1
105	Andy Burrows	"Hometown"	Play It Again Sam	19 January 2013	1
106	Macklemore & Ryan Lewis	"Thrift Shop"	Macklemore	26 January 2013	1
107	Droideka	"Get Hyper"	Droieka	2 February 2013	1
108	The Risk	"Missiles"	The Risk	9 February 2013	1
109	Josh Record	"For Your Love"	National Anthem	16 February 2013	1
110	The 1975	"Chocolate"	Dirty Hit	23 February 2013	3
111	Bigger Than Us	"Song for DD"	Bigger Than Us	16 March 2013	1
112	Gorgon City featuring Yasmin	"Real"	Black Butter	23 March 2013	2
113	Macklemore & Ryan Lewis	"Can't Hold Us"	Macklemore	6 April 2013	1
re	Gorgon City featuring Yasmin	"Real"	Black Butter	13 April 2013	1
114	Jim Johnston	"WWE - Chachalala (Fandango)"	WWE	20 April 2013	1
115	Viralites	"Feel my Rhythm"	Geoma	27 April 2013	1
116	Sleeping with Sirens	"Low"	Rise	4 May 2013	1
117	Area 11 featuring Beckii Cruel	"Shi No Barado"	Yogscast Studios	11 May 2013	1
118	Imran Khan	"Satisfya"	IK	18 May 2013	1
119	Colossal Tunes	"La La La"	Colossal Tunes	25 May 2013	1
120	Zach Sobiech/A Firm Handshake	"Clouds"	Rock The Cause	1 June 2013	1
121	Icona Pop Band	"I Love It"	Ultimate Hit	8 June 2013	1
122	Keith Lemon	"I Wanna Go on You"	Keith Lemon	15 June 2013	1
123	Venus Angelic	"I Love It (I Don't Care)"	Taucher	22 June 2013	1
124	Remix Junkies	"I Don't Care I Love It"	Remix Junkies	29 June 2013	1
125	New Music Masters	"I Don't Care I Love It"	New Music Masters	6 July 2013	4
126	Edward Sharpe and the Magnetic Zeros	"Home"	Rough Trade	3 August 2013	6
127	Select Hits	"Talk Dirty"	Select Hits	14 September 2013	2
128	PewDiePie & The Gregory Brothers	"Jabba the Hutt"	Gregory Residence	28 September 2013	1
129	Chip Chocolate	"Cookie Dance"	Chip Chocolate	5 October 2013	1
130	Awolnation	"Sail"	Red Bull	12 October 2013	1
131	Scrufizzer	"Kick It"	Black Butter	19 October 2013	1
re	Awolnation	"Sail"	Red Bull	26 October 2013	3
132	RY X	"Berlin"	Dumont Dumont	16 November 2013	3
133	Shadow Child featuring Takura	"Friday"	New State	7 December 2013	1
134	TC	"Get Down Low"	Owsla	14 December 2013	1
135	Vance Joy	"Riptide"	Infectious	21 December 2013	1
136	Clutha Appeal	"Won't Forget"	PK Music	28 December 2013	1
2014
137	Starstruck Karaoke	"Timber"	Starstruck Karaoke	4 January 2014	1
re	Vance Joy	"Riptide"	Infectious	11 January 2014	1
138	Mike Hough	"Better"	Mike Hough	18 January 2014	1
139	Choir of Young Believers	"Hollow Talk"	Ghostly International	25 January 2014	1
140	Saint Raymond	"Young Blood"	National Anthem	1 February 2014	1
141	DJ Stay the Night	"Stay the Night"	Foodcourt	8 February 2014	1
142	Red Hot Chili Pipers	"Wake Me Up"	Rel	15 February 2014	1
143	Big Secret Sound	"Soldier On"	Big Secret Sound	22 February 2014	1
re	Edward Sharpe and the Magnetic Zeros	"Home"	Rough Trade	1 March 2014	1
144	The Chainsmokers	"Selfie"	Dim Mak	8 March 2014	2
145	The Handsome Family	"Far from Any Road"	Loose	22 March 2014	3
146	Ultimate Dance	"Hideaway"	Devotion	12 April 2014	1
147	JFT96 Collective	"We Are Liverpool"	Local Stigmatic	19 April 2014	1
148	M.O	"For a Minute"	Operator	26 April 2014	1
149	Cinematic Orchestra	"To Build a Home"	Ninja Tune	3 May 2014	1
150	Ricky Dillon	"Ordinary"	Ricky Dillon	10 May 2014	1
151	Essex Young Farmers	"Put That Hoedown"	Cucko	17 May 2014	1
152	Molly Kate Kestner	"His Daughter"	Broken Phone Production	24 May 2014	2
153	Act	"Sing"	Matchcode	7 June 2014	1
154	Michelle Williams/Beyoncé	"Say Yes"	Eone Music	14 June 2014	1
155	USA Soccer Guy	"Kick That Soccer Ball"	USA Soccer Guy	21 June 2014	1
156	Milky Chance	"Stolen Dance"	Ignition	28 June 2014	2
157	Jungle	"Time"	XL	12 July 2014	2
158	Second Avenue	"Rude"	Second Avenue	26 July 2014	1
159	Family Of the Year	"Hero"	Nettwerk	2 August 2014	1
160	Nafees & The Prophec	"Tera Pyar"	SMP	9 August 2014	1
161	FKA Twigs	"Two Weeks"	Young Turks	16 August 2014	1
162	Kingsland Road	"Dirty Dancer"	Soundcheck	23 August 2014	1
163	Mega Giants	"Prayer In C"	Matchcode	30 August 2014	1
164	M.O	"Dance On My Own"	Operator	6 September 2014	2
165	Sam Redden	"Say Something I'm Giving Up On You"	Sam Redden	20 September 2014	1
166	Power Music Workout	"All About That Bass"	Power Music	27 September 2014	1
167	Meghan Tonjes	"All About That Bass"	Loudr	4 October 2014	1
168	Sheridan Smith	"Anyone Who Had A Heart"	ITV Studios	11 October 2014	2
169	Heavy	"How You Like Me Now"	Counter	25 October 2014	1
170	Independents	"UKIP Calypso"	Angel Air	1 November 2014	1
171	Blackalicious	"Alphabet Aerobics"	Mo Wax	8 November 2014	1
172	Lo-Fang	"You're the One That I Want"	4AD	15 November 2014	1
173	Emma Blackery	"Perfect"	Firefight	22 November 2014	1
174	Diljit Dosanjh	"Patiala Peg"	Century	29 November 2014	1
175	Hudson Mohawke	"Chimes"	Warp	6 December 2014	1
re	Lo-Fang	"You're the One That I Want"	4AD	13 December 2014	2
176	The Peace Collective	"All Together Now"	Demon Music	27 December 2014	1
2015
re	Lo-Fang	"You're the One That I Want"	4AD	3 January 2015	1
177	Tony Evans	"Auld Lang Syne"	Tema	10 January 2015	1
178	Låpsley	"Falling Short"	XL	17 January 2015	2
179	Nathan Grisdale	"Only One"	Boxx Geoma	31 January 2015	1
180	Sofia Karlberg	"Crazy in Love"	X5	7 February 2015	4
181	Neo N	"When the Beat Drops Out"	Matchcode	7 March 2015	1
182	Rene Lavice featuring Ivy Mairi	"The Calling"	RAM	14 March 2015	1
183	Stormzy	"Know Me From"	Stormzy	21 March 2015	1
184	Soak	"Sea Creatures"	Rough Trade	28 March 2015	2
185	Felix Zimma	"Cheerleader"	Zimma Corp	11 April 2015	1
186	Normanrockx	"Cheerleader"	STS Global Entertainment	18 April 2015	2
187	Marcus Feehily	"Love is a Drug"	Harmoney	2 May 2015	1
188	T-Wayne	"Nasty Freestyle"	T-Wayne	9 May 2015	1
189	M.O	"Preach"	Operator	16 May 2015	2
190	Joey Graceffa	"Don't Wait"	Joey Graceffa	30 May 2015	1
191	Mr Meanor	"Here With You"	Geoma	6 June 2015	1
192	Jme	"Man Don't Care"	Boy Better Know	13 June 2015	1
193	David Carter	"Are You with Me"	Matchcode	20 June 2015	1
194	Daytuner	"Are You with Me"	MM Media Pool	27 June 2015	1
re	Jme	"Man Don't Care"	Boy Better Know	4 July 2015	2
195	Pure Hitstars	"Watch Me (Whip Nae Nae)"	Silento	11 July 2015	1
196	The Score	"Oh My Love"	The Score	18 July 2015	4
197	Only The Young	"I Do"	The Qworkz	20 August 2015	1
198	Mike Garry & Joe Duddell	"St Anthony (an ode to Anthony H Wilson)"	Skinny Dog	27 August 2015	1
199	Sigala	"Easy Love"	Ministry of Sound	3 September 2015	2
200	Johnny Stimsom	"Holding On"	Rocket	17 September 2015	2
201	Lady Leshurr	"Queens Speech 4"	Lady Leshurr	1 October 2015	2
202	Låpsley	"Hurt Me"	XL	15 October 2015	2
re	Lady Leshurr	"Queens Speech 4"	Lady Leshurr	29 October 2015	11
2016
203	Lady Leshurr	"Queens Speech 5"	Lady Leshurr	14 January 2016	2
204	Flume featuring Kai	"Never Be like You"	Transgressive	28 January 2016	1
205	Marcus Butler featuring Conor Maynard	"I'm Famous"	Marcus Butler	4 February 2016	1
re	Flume featuring Kai	"Never Be like You"	Transgressive	11 February 2016	2
206	Riton featuring Kah-Lo	"Rinse & Repeat"	Ministry of Sound	25 February 2016	2
re	Flume featuring Kai	"Never Be like You"	Transgressive	10 March 2016	8
207	Flume featuring Tove Lo	"Say It"	Transgressive	5 May 2016	1
208	Jacob Sartorius	"Sweatshirt"	T3	12 May 2016	1
re	Flume featuring Kai	"Never Be like You"	Transgressive	19 May 2016	2
209	Tieks featuring Dan Harkna	"Sunshine"	Ministry Of Sound	2 June 2016	1
210	DJ Kenno	"Will Griggs On Fire"	DJ Kenno	9 June 2016	2
211	Joel Adams	"Please Don't Go"	Will Walker	23 June 2016	18
212	John Gibbons	"Would I Lie to You?"	Good Soldier	27 October 2016	1
213	Andy Grammer	"Fresh Eyes"	S-Curve	3 November 2016	8
214	Everly Pregnant Brothers	"Chip Pan"	EPB	29 December 2016	1
2017
215	Migos	"Bad and Boujee"	Quality Control	5 January 2017	3
re	John Gibbons	"Would I Lie to You?"	Good Soldier	26 January 2017	1
216	AJR	"Weak"	S-Curve	2 February 2017	1
217	Dave & J Hus	"Samantha"	Tropics	9 February 2017	12
218	Lord Huron	"The Night We Met"	Play It Again Sam	4 May 2017	2
219	Maggie Lindemann	"Pretty Girl"	300	18 May 2017	1
re	Lord Huron	"The Night We Met"	Play It Again Sam	25 May 2017	1
220	John Gibbons	"P.Y.T. (Pretty Young Thing)"	Good Soldier	1 June 2017	11
221	Hardy Caprio featuring One Acen	"Unsigned"	A21	17 August 2017	8
222	Yxng Bane	"Rihanna"	Disturbing London	12 October 2017	1
re	Hardy Caprio featuring One Acen	"Unsigned"	A21	19 October 2017	16
2018
223	SL	"Tropical"	SL	8 February 2018	1
re	Hardy Caprio featuring One Acen	"Unsigned"	A21	15 February 2018	10
224	Loski	"Forrest Gump"	Since 93 Use Music	26 April 2018	1
225	Kyle featuring Kehlani	"PlayInWitMe"	Independently Popular	3 May 2018	2
226	Belly Squad featuring Headie One	"Missing"	Belly Squad	17 May 2018	1
227	Netta Barzilai	"Toy"	Tedy	24 May 2018	1
re	Belly Squad featuring Headie One	"Missing"	Belly Squad	31 May 2018	2
228	Loud Luxury featuring Brando	"Body"	Armada	14 June 2018	1
re	Belly Squad featuring Headie One	"Missing"	Belly Squad	21 June 2018	1
229	XXXTentacion featuring Trippie Redd	"Fuck Love"	Bad Vibes Forever	28 June 2018	4
230	Freya Ridings	"Lost Without You"	Good Soldier	26 July 2018	6
231	Bugzy Malone featuring Rag'n'Bone Man	"Run"	BSomebody	6 September 2018	1
232	Unknown T	"HomertonB"	Unknown T	13 September 2018	3
233	Cadet and Deno Driz	"Advice"	Underrated Legends	4 October 2018	3
234	DigDat	"Airforce"	Myles Harris	25 October 2018	1
235	Ambush Buzzworl	"Man Can't"	Buzzworl Ent	1 November 2018	1
re	DigDat	"Airforce"	Myles Harris	8 November 2018	3
re	XXXTentacion featuring Trippie Redd	"Fuck Love"	Bad Vibes Forever	29 November 2018	1
236	Fisher	"Losing It"	Catch & Release	6 December 2018	1
237	6ix9ine featuring Kanye West	"Kanga"	Ten Thousand Projects	13 December 2018	1
238	The Fire Tones	"Do They Know It's Christmas?"	The Fire Tones	20 December 2018	1
239	Flakefleet Primary School	"Light Up"	DareToDream	27 December 2018	1
2019
re	Fisher	"Losing It"	Catch & Release	3 January 2019	6
240	Blueface	"Thotiana"	5th Amendment Entertainment	14 February 2019	1
re	Fisher	"Losing It"	Catch & Release	21 February 2019	3
241	Nafe Smallz featuring M Huncho	"Like A Firm"	Nafe Smallz	14 March 2019	2
re	Fisher	"Losing It"	Catch & Release	28 March 2019	1
242	SL	"FWA Boss"	SL	4 April 2019	2
243	Calboy	"Envy Me"	Paper Gang	18 April 2019	3
244	SL	"Homeage"	SL	9 May 2019	1
245	Jaykae & Aitch featuring Bowzer Boss	"On the Way Home"	Doing Bitz	16 May 2019	2
246	Keiino	"Spirit In The Sky"	HugoWorld	30 May 2019	1
247	Joyner Lucas featuring Logic	"ISIS"	Joyner Lucas	6 June 2019	1
248	Jim Radford	"The Shores of Normandy"	Frty Fve	13 June 2019	1
249	Fisher	"You Little Beauty"	Good Company	20 June 2019	2
250	T Mulla featuring Hardy Caprio	"Droptop"	1Way EntertainmenT T Mulla	4 July 2019	1
251	Dave and AJ Tracey	"Thiago Silva"	Tropics	11 July 2019	1
252	The Plug featuring Dappy and Tory Lanez	"Not Today"	The Plug	18 July 2019	2
253	The Plug	"Rich"	The Plug	1 August 2019	4
254	Blade Brown featuring K Trap	"Joints"	Catalyst	29 August 2019	1
255	Amy Wadge	"Faith's Song"	Cold Coffee Music	5 September 2019	1
re	The Plug	"Rich"	The Plug	12 September 2019	1
re	Amy Wadge	"Faith's Song"	Cold Coffee Music	19 September 2019	1
re	The Plug	"Rich"	The Plug	26 September 2019	2
256	J-Hope featuring Becky G	"Chicken Noodle Soup"	Big Hit	10 October 2019	1
257	Roberto Surace	"Joys"	Defected	17 October 2019	1
258	Endor	"Pump It Up"	Defected	24 October 2019	3
259	Arizona Zervas	"Roxanne"	Arizona Zervas	14 November 2019	1
260	Ant Saunders	"Yellow Hearts"	Distro Kid.Com	21 November 2019	1
261	Trevor Daniel	"Falling"	Alamo	28 November 2019	2
re	Roberto Surace	"Joys"	Defected	12 December 2019	1
262	Young Adz and GeeYou	"Push Weight"	GeeYou	19 December 2019	1
263	Sidemen	"The Gift"	Sidemen	26 December 2019	3

=== By artist ===
35 artists have spent four or more weeks at the top of the chart during the 2010s.

Artist	Number-one singles	Weeks at number one
Hardy Caprio	2	35
Joel Adams	1	18
Flume	2	14
Fisher	2	13
John Gibbons	2	13
Lady Leshurr	2	13
Dave	2	13
J Hus	1	12
The Plug	2	9
Andy Grammer	1	8
James Vincent McMorrow	1	8
Edward Sharpe and the Magnetic Zeros	1	7
Freya Ridings	1	6
All Time Low	2	5
Jme	3	5
M.O	3	5
Nadia Ali	1	5
Toddla T	1	5
Woodkid	2	5
XXXTentacion	1	5
Big Hits 2012	3	4
The Score	1	4
Allie Moss	1	4
Awolnation	1	4
Avicii	1	4
Belly Squad	1	4
Black Sheep	1	4
DigDat	1	4
Headie One as featuring	1	4
Laidback Luke	1	4
Lo-Fang	1	4
New Music Masters	1	4
Sofia Karlberg	1	4
Steve Aoki	1	4
Sebastian Drums	1	4
Låpsley	2	4
SL	3	4

=== By record label ===
As of 2 August 2019, thirty two record labels have spent four or more weeks at the top of the chart so far during the 2010s.

Record label	Number-one singles	Weeks at number one
A21	1	34
Good Soldier	3	19
Will Walker	1	18
Ministry of Sound	6	14
Transgressive	2	14
Lady Leshurr	2	13
Tropics	2	13
Catch & Release	1	11
XL	6	10
The Plug	2	9
Rough Trade	3	9
Believe Digital	1	8
S-Curve	1	8
4AD	2	7
New State	3	7
Ninja Tune	2	6
Bad Vibes Forever	1	5
Operator	3	5
Defected	5	10
Green United	2	5
Hopeless	2	5
Boy Better Know	3	5
Play It Again Sam	3	5
Belly Squad	1	4
Dirty Hit	2	4
Black Sheep	1	4
New Music Masters	1	4
The Score	1	4
Red Bull	1	4
Black Butter	2	4
Matchcode	4	4
Myles Harris	1	4
SL	3	4
