= Frankee Connolly =

English singer (born 1989)

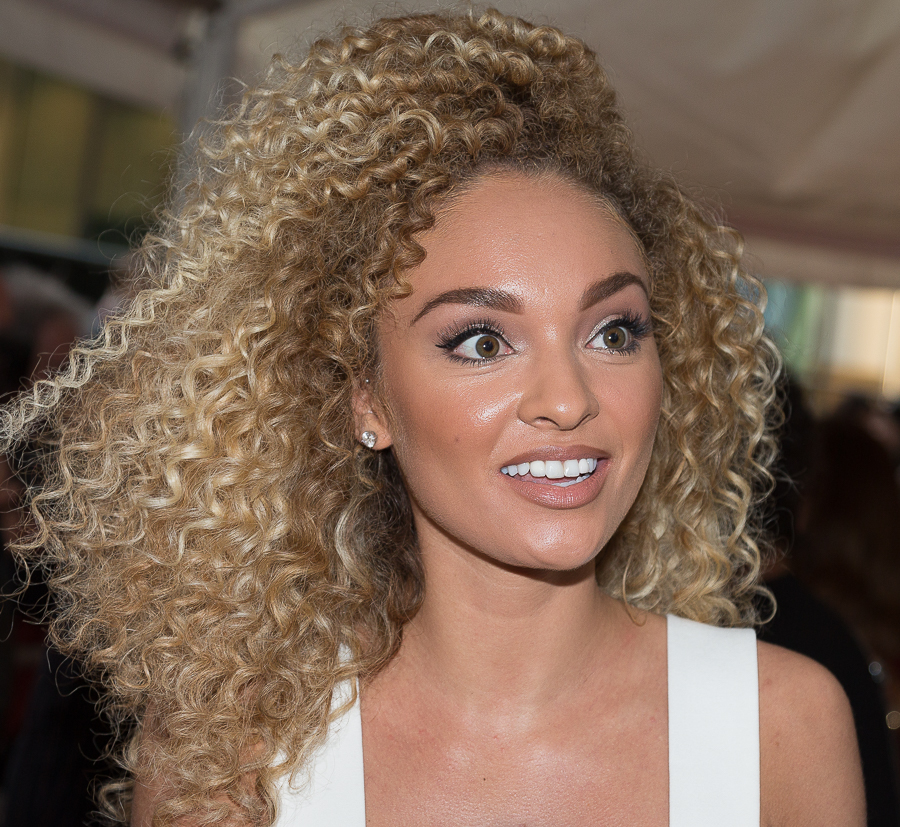
- Connolly at the Glamour Women of the Year Awards 2015

Background information
- Born: Francesca Rose Connolly; Helmshore, England
- Occupations: Singer, rapper
- Years active: 2009–2017
- Labels: Geffen; Polydor; Operator
- Formerly of: Mini Viva; M.O

Francesca Rose Connolly is an English singer from Helmshore. She was a member of the groups Mini Viva, who had a No. 7 hit with "Left My Heart in Tokyo", and M.O, with whom she had a No. 18 hit with "Who Do You Think Of?".

== Life and career ==
Francesca Rose Connolly was born to Eddie and Lorraine, and has two older sisters, Natalie and Jade. Both Natalie and their uncle were dentists in Rawtenstall. She grew up in Helmshore in Rossendale Valley in Lancashire, and attended All Saints' Catholic High School in Rawtenstall, before spending two months on a Business Access to Higher Education course at a college in Bury in Greater Manchester. Growing up, she idolised Beyoncé and Destiny's Child, and regularly attended their concerts; she also looked up to Mel B, as a successful Northerner. After dropping out of college, she formed an amateur girl band with two other members for fun.

In 2007, after Xenomania decided to form a band in response to Girls Aloud taking a year off, they contacted Connolly via her Myspace account, prompting her to attend an audition in London, where she met Britt Love, a singer from Newcastle upon Tyne, who she bonded with over their shared Northern roots. Their band name, Mini Viva, was a portmanteau of Love and Connolly's nicknames; the pair told the Lancashire Telegraph in September 2009 that Love acquired her nickname after wearing a Minnie Mousesque polka dot dress and that Connolly acquired hers after Love described her as bright and beautiful. Connolly then underwent her first singing lessons, having not taken any prior to being signed.

Mini Viva's singles "Left My Heart in Tokyo" and "I Wish" charted at numbers 7 and 73 on the UK Singles Chart, and the pair supported the Saturdays, Diversity, and Aggro Santos on tour. They announced their split in November 2010; Connolly later formed M.O in 2012 with Nadine Samuels and Annie Ashcroft of the girl group Duchess, taking their name from a lyric in "The Motto" by Drake. Between 2014 and 2016, the band supported Little Mix on their Salute Tour and entered the UK Singles Chart at numbers 49, 51, and 18 with "Dance On My Own", "Preach" and "Who Do You Think Of?", and then teamed up with Kent Jones for "Not in Love", which peaked at No. 42. Connolly left the band in June 2017; she was replaced by Chanal Benjalili, who had auditioned for the previous year's series of The X Factor.

== Discography ==
=== With Mini Viva ===
Extended plays

List of EPs, with selected details
Title	Details
Engine Room Session	Released: 14 December 2009; Label: Polydor; Format: Digital download

Singles

Title	Year	Peak chart positions			Album
Title	Year	UK	FIN	IRE	Album
"Left My Heart in Tokyo"	2009	7	7	23	Non-album singles
"I Wish"	2009	73	—	67	Non-album singles
"One Touch"	2010	124	—	—	Non-album singles
"—" denotes a recording that did not chart or was not released in that territory.

=== With M.O ===
Extended plays

List of EPs, with selected details
Title	Details
Good Friends	Released: 9 February 2016; Label: Operator Records; Format: Digital download
Who Do You Think Of?	Released: 2 August 2016; Label: Operator Records; Format: Digital download

Singles

Title	Year	Peak chart positions			Certifications (sales thresholds)	Album
Title	Year	UK	(indie)	IRE	Certifications (sales thresholds)	Album
"For a Minute"	2014	103	6	—		Non-album singles
"Dance On My Own"	2014	49	4	—		Non-album singles
"Preach"	2015	51	4	—		Non-album singles
"Who Do You Think Of?"	2016	18	—	56	BPI: Platinum	Who Do You Think Of? (EP)
"Not in Love" (featuring Kent Jones)	2016	42	—	75		Non-album single
"—" denotes a recording that did not chart or was not released in that territory.

== Tours ==
As supporting act

- 2009: The Saturdays – The Work Tour (select dates)
- 2010: Diversity – UK tour

== Filmography ==
Year	Title	Role	Notes
2010	Viva Mini Viva	Herself	Interactive online reality show

== Awards and nominations ==
Year	Award	Category	Outcome
2014	MOBO Awards	Best Newcomer	Nominated
2016	MOBO Awards	Best Song	Nominated
