= Yeo Valley (disambiguation) =

Yeo Valley could refer to:

- the valley of the Congresbury Yeo
- the valley of any of the other River Yeos
- the company Yeo Valley Organic or the rap which features in its adverts
