= Death of Elijah Doughty =

2016 death of Aboriginal Teenager in Australia

Elijah Doughty, a 14-year-old Indigenous Australian riding a motorbike, was involved in a fatal traffic collision with a ute on 29 August 2016, near Kalgoorlie, Western Australia. The 56-year-old white male driver (who could not legally be identified) of the ute was the owner of the motorbike, which had been stolen the previous day. Although he was chasing Doughty, it is unclear where Doughty got the bike and there is no evidence that Doughty had stolen it; his friends said that he was handed the bike at Gribble Creek Reserve, where he was killed.

The driver offered to plead guilty to dangerous driving causing death, but was subsequently charged with manslaughter. He was acquitted by a jury on 21 July 2017 after a trial at the Supreme Court of Western Australia. However, he was found guilty of the lesser charge of dangerous driving causing death.

The incident led to significant protests and increased racial tensions within Kalgoorlie, with accusations that the driver was not charged with or convicted of a more serious crime only because Doughty was Indigenous.

== Incident ==
On 28 August 2016, the owner of the motorbike and his wife had been out to visit friends. When they returned home, he found that two motorbikes were missing: a red 70 cc Zhejiang used by the couple's children, and a red Honda 50 motorbike that did not work but held sentimental value for her. It was the third time the family had had motorbikes stolen from them. The owner searched the streets near his home until 10:30 pm. The next morning, he resumed his search. At 8:30 am he was parked near Gribble Creek, where the police had told him dirtbikes were often dumped, when he saw one of his bikes ridden by a hoodie-clad figure. He chased the bike in his Nissan Navara ute along a dirt track and collided with it when "the bike unexpectedly turned right in front of him", killing Doughty. This explanation was accepted during the course of the trial, and no evidence was presented to contradict it.

Doughty's injuries included his skull being split and brain stem snapped, spinal cord severed, most of his ribs broken, pelvis fractured, and leg and ankle mangled. His body was found 9.5 m (31 ft) from the largest piece of wreckage. The ute had continued in a straight line for 34 m (112 ft).

Kalgoorlie's acting police commander, Darryl Gaunt, told the media that the bike that Doughty was riding had been reported stolen the night before his death but that it was unclear where Doughty had gotten it. According to Doughty's friends, he had been handed the bike in the reserve.

== Immediate aftermath ==
The day following the incident, a protest was held outside the Kalgoorlie Courthouse. Approximately 200 people, some armed with rocks and bottles, broke down the gates of the court and surrounded police, who used pepper spray and riot shields in response. Darryl Doughty, Elijah's father, stated that the trouble started when court guards decided to lock the front door. Relatives and friends wanted to hear the man's explanation, but were refused entry into the court. The police prosecutor informed Darryl that the matter would have to be delayed until the afternoon and completed by video link and obtained Darryl's phone number. However, Darryl was not contacted, and the accused was instead flown to Perth to face court.

With tensions rising, Darryl was asked by police to address the gathered crowd to calm them, but a small group had already damaged a police vehicle. Fifteen police officers were injured and over $40,000 of property damage occurred during the riot, which resulted in 30 people being charged with 55 offences.

The local Indigenous broadcaster Debbie Carmody accused local anti-crime Facebook groups of "inciting violence and murder" against Indigenous youth.

With a vigil set-up at the site of Doughty's death, Kalgoorlie Police Superintendent Darryl Gaunt said that his officers had witnessed non-Indigenous residents driving fast and close to the bush vigil at which Doughty died and yelled abuse at mourners.

In September 2016, the house the man lived in – a rental – was burnt down, with WA Police announcing an arson investigation.

== Investigation and trial ==
The driver was interviewed by police the same day as Doughty's death and said that he was "trying to catch up with a motorbike that I know, I think, is mine, and hoping that the rider would go into the bush and fall off".

The ute driver was charged with manslaughter and pleaded not guilty after his offer – to plead guilty to the lesser charge of dangerous driving causing death – had been rejected by the state.

The trial was held in the Supreme Court of Western Australia from 17 to 21 July 2017. During the trial, the ute driver stated that he had not intended to hit Doughty and that Doughty had "veered in front of him". He could not prevent the collision because he was driving too close to the motorbike. The defence asserted that the act of chasing the motorbike to reclaim it was not illegal, and that the state had exaggerated the condition of the track. The defence did however, acknowledge that the man had been driving too close to Doughty. The prosecution argued that given the speed, conditions of the track, and the difference in power between the ute and the motorbike, the man's driving was criminally negligent.

On 21 July 2017, the jury in the trial found the driver not guilty of manslaughter but guilty of dangerous driving occasioning death. After the verdict, members of the public gallery screamed abuse at the defendant and the jury. The court was briefly adjourned to allow their removal by security.

Supporters of Doughty, watching the proceedings in Kalgoorlie by video link, protested the verdict, many of them wearing T-shirts with the Black Lives Matter slogan. The protest was described by journalists as vocal but peaceful.

== Aftermath ==
After the jury verdict on 21 July, a number of rallies and vigils were held across Australia to call for justice for Doughty. A crowd of approximately 150 protesters gathered outside the Supreme Court of New South Wales on 24 July 2017 and chanted, "What do we want? Justice. What have we got? Fuck all". Some protestors spread red ochre over the windows of the Supreme Court, and one woman threw it onto the steps, screaming "This is the blood of Aboriginal people, don't wait for this to be your children's".

On 26 July 2017, protestors in Brisbane sat on the road to block the intersection of Albert and Adelaide Streets. Another protest took place in Melbourne on 28 July 2017 in which protestors marched to Flinders Street railway station, sat on the road, started a fire in a metal drum for the purpose of a smoking ceremony, and blocked one of the city's busiest intersections. One man was arrested, and the Metropolitan Fire Brigade extinguished the fire.

On 30 July, the comedian Chris Lilley apologised for reposting a controversial video a few days after the verdict. It was a music video titled "Squashed Nigga" and was part of his 2011 TV comedy series, Angry Boys. It featured his fictional character S.mouse singing about an Indigenous boy who had died after being run over by a truck, and included imagery of a boy lying on a road. Many criticised the timing of the posting, but Lilley insisted there was no relation to "current news stories".

On 28 August 2017, police charged Doughty's father, Darryl, over an incident at the Kalgoorlie Magistrates Court. He was selected for a security search with a metal detector wand by a male security and custodial officer, but police allege that he failed to comply and then left the building. Police stated that Darryl was seen "acting aggressively" towards a member of the public and allegedly assaulted a court officer causing minor injuries. He was charged with assault and released on bail after he appeared at court; he pleaded not guilty. He was due to appear in court again on 6 September.

Academic and social justice advocate Gerry Georgatos, who supported Doughty's family since his death, stated, "Someone has to call out the perpetrator of Elijah's death for what he did. It was rage filled violence, of such intense rage that it was murderous." The comments have been criticised by commentators who pointed out that delivering cardiopulmonary resuscitation to Doughty was inconsistent with murderous intent.

The man responsible for Doughty's death was granted parole after he had served about 19 months behind bars.
