= Yeo (disambiguation) =

Yeo is a surname. Yeo or YEO may also refer to:

== Rivers ==
- Barnstaple Yeo, a tributary of the River Taw in Devon, UK
- Cheddar Yeo, a tributary of the River Axe in Somerset, UK
- Congresbury Yeo, a tributary of the Severn Estuary in Somerset, UK
- Land Yeo, a tributary of the Bristol Channel in Somerset, UK
- Lapford Yeo, a tributary of the River Taw in Devon, UK
- Lox Yeo, a tributary of the River Axe in Somerset, UK
- Mark Yeo, a tributary of the River Axe in Somerset, UK
- River Yeo, Molland, a tributary to the River Mole in Devon, UK
- River Yeo (South Somerset), a river in Somerset, UK, and which joins the River Parrett near Langport
- River Yeo (tributary of the Creedy) in Devon, UK
- River Yeo (tributary of the Torridge) in Devon, UK

== Places ==
- Yeo Island, British Columbia, Canada
- Yeo Lake, Western Australia, Australia
- Yeo Yeo, New South Wales, Australia

== Companies and organisations ==
- Yeo Hiap Seng, an investment holding company commonly known as Yeo's
- YEO, the original name for the non-profit Entrepreneurs' Organization
- Yeo Valley Organic, a dairy business based in Somerset, UK
  - "Yeo Valley Rap", a song from an advertisement by Yeo Valley Organic that entered the UK music charts in 2010

== Transport ==
- Yeo (locomotive), a British narrow gauge railway locomotive built in 1897
- Yeo Mill railway station, a former railway station in Devon, UK
- YEO, the IATA code for RNAS Yeovilton (HMS Heron), a Royal Navy airfield in Somerset, UK
- YEO, the National Rail code for Yeoford railway station in Devon, UK
