= Not in Love =

Not in Love may refer to:

- "Not in Love" (Enrique Iglesias song), 2004
- "Not in Love" (M.O song), 2016
- "Not in Love" (Platinum Blonde song), 1984
  - "Not in Love" (Crystal Castles song), 2010

== See also ==
- "I'm Not in Love", a 1975 song by English group 10cc
