= Boom Boom (Heartbeat) =

Single by Ray Foxx featuring Rachel K Collier
- Released: 11 August 2013
- Recorded: 2013
- Genre: Dance, house
- Length: 3:14 (Radio Edit)
- Label: Island Records
- Songwriter(s): Rachel K Collier, Ray Foxx

Ray Foxx singles chronology
"Butterflies" (2012)	"Boom Boom (Heartbeat)" (2013)	"Fireworks (Bang Bang)" (2014)

Rachel K Collier singles chronology
"2 Us" (2012)	"Boom Boom (Heartbeat)" (2013)

"Boom Boom (Heartbeat)" is a song by British DJ Ray Foxx featuring vocals from Welsh singer Rachel K Collier. It peaked at No. 12 on the UK Singles Chart, number 2 on the UK Dance Chart and number 13 on the Scottish Singles Chart.

== Music video ==
A music video to accompany the release of "Boom Boom (Heartbeat)" was first released onto YouTube on 5 July 2013 at a total length of three minutes and nineteen seconds. The video was directed by Tom Paton.

== Track listing ==
Digital download
No.	Title	Length
1.	"Boom Boom (Heartbeat)" (feat. Rachel K Collier) (Radio Edit)	3:14
2.	"Boom Boom (Heartbeat)" (feat. Rachel K Collier) (L Plus Vocal Mix)	4:05
3.	"Boom Boom (Heartbeat)" (feat. Rachel K Collier) (Crazibiza Poolside Radio Edit)	3:11
4.	"Boom Boom (Heartbeat)" (feat. Rachel K Collier) (Original Mix)	4:33
5.	"Boom Boom (Heartbeat)" (feat. Rachel K Collier) (Taiki & Nulight Remix)	4:39
6.	"Boom Boom (Heartbeat)" (feat. Rachel K Collier) (Rivaz Remix)	5:43

Digital download - Remixes
No.	Title	Length
1.	"Boom Boom (Heartbeat)" (feat. Rachel K Collier) (Sami Wentz Remix)	3:14
2.	"Boom Boom (Heartbeat)" (feat. Rachel K Collier) (Ray Foxx Digs Deep Mix)	4:05
3.	"Boom Boom (Heartbeat)" (feat. Rachel K Collier) (Tom Piper Remix)	3:11
4.	"Boom Boom (Heartbeat)" (feat. Rachel K Collier) (L Plus Vocal Mix)	4:33
5.	"Boom Boom (Heartbeat)" (feat. Rachel K Collier) (L Plus Club Mix)	4:39
6.	"Boom Boom (Heartbeat)" (feat. Rachel K Collier) (Ray Foxx Garage Mix)	5:43
7.	"Boom Boom (Heartbeat)" (feat. Rachel K Collier) (Jett Remix)	4:33

== Chart performance ==
Chart (2013)	Peak positions
Belgium (Ultratip Bubbling Under Flanders)	13
Belgium (Ultratip Bubbling Under Wallonia)	7
Czech Republic (Rádio – Top 100)	94
Scotland (OCC)	13
Slovakia (Rádio Top 100)	64
UK Dance (OCC)	2
UK Singles (OCC)	12

== Release history ==
Country	Date	Format	Label
United Kingdom	11 August 2013	Digital download	Island Records
