= Hardy Caprio =

British rapper and singer

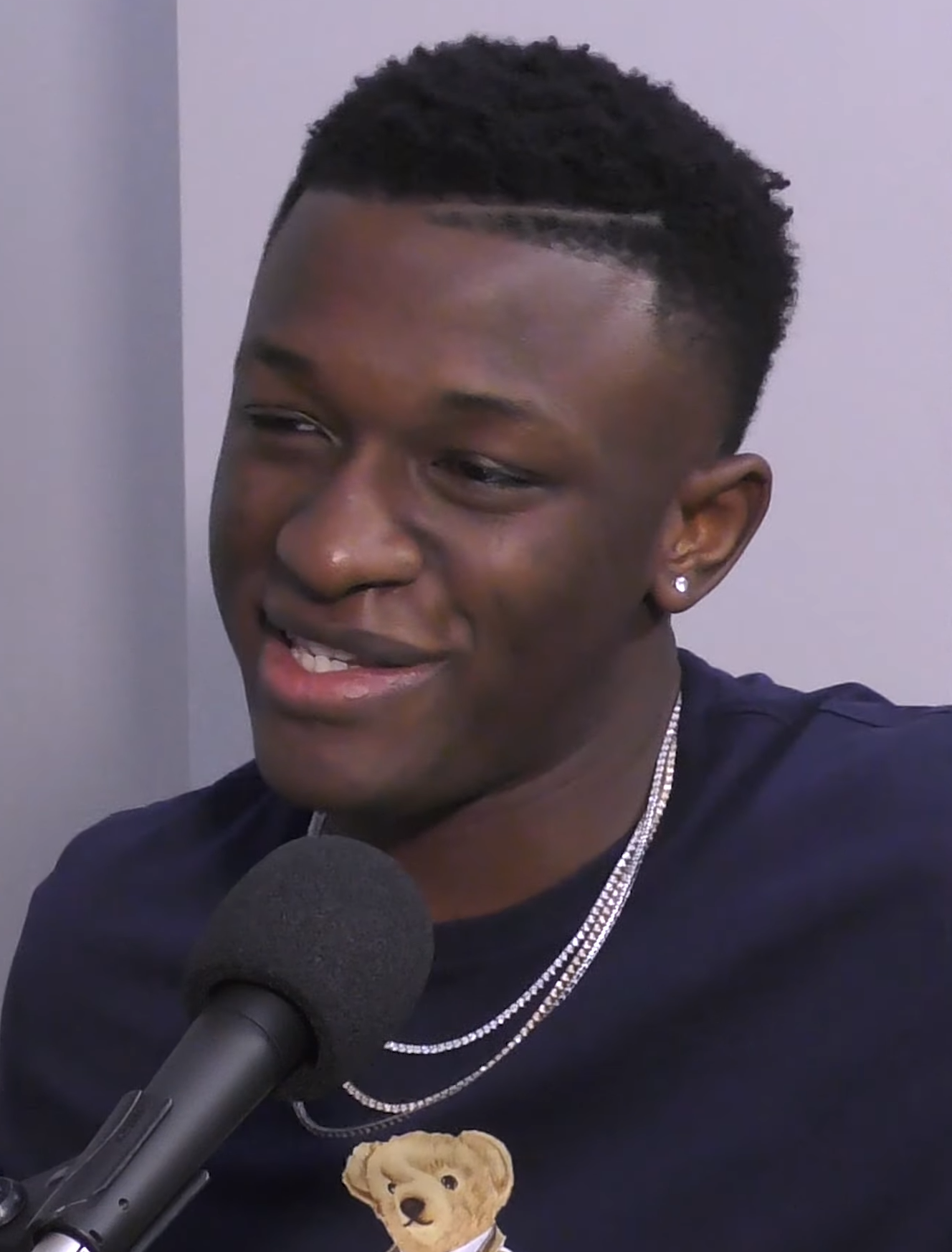
- Hardy Caprio in 2021

Background information
- Also known as: Hardy (2013–2015); Profitz (2010–2013)
- Born: Hardy Tayyib-Bah; 23 May 1996 (age 30); Sierra Leone
- Origin: Croydon, London, England
- Genres: British hip hop; afroswing
- Occupations: Rapper; singer; songwriter; record producer
- Years active: 2010–present
- Label: Virgin EMI

Hardy Tayyib-Bah (born 23 May 1996), known professionally as Hardy Caprio, is a Sierra Leonean-born British rapper and singer.

By 2020, Hardy has released a string of successful releases, broken into The Official UK Top 20, and amassed over 270 million streams online.

== Career ==
=== 2010–2016: Early career ===
Hardy began his music career in 2010, debuting his career under the rap name Profitz. At the age of 14, Profitz introduced himself to the music scene with his '#KNWME freestyle'. Hardy also featured on a few freestyles alongside South London rapper Novelist (MC). In 2010 Profitz went on to release his first project titled 'A New Page'. He later went on to release his first mixtape 'Indecisive' in 2013 under a new rap name, Hardy.

=== 2017–2018: Rise to popularity, Hardy Season and The Hollywood EP ===
Under the new name Hardy Caprio, he was inspired by Croydon artists such as Krept and Konan and Stormzy receiving a widespread success across the UK, which motivated him to pursue music more seriously. Hardy went on to release over 20 videos in 2017, going from 10,000 views to 100,000 in a year. One notable freestyle he dropped was on the SB.TV platform, which helped raise his profile. Hardy rapped over Flukes instrumental "Wifey", a Rhythm & Grime song originally released and made famous by Tinie Tempah in 2006. In 2017, Hardy released "Unsigned" and "Super Soaker" alongside One Acen. "Unsigned" became a platinum single, garnered over 14 million views on YouTube, over 30 million streams, and reached number 2 on the UK Independent Chart.

== Discography ==
=== Mixtapes ===
- Indecisive (as Hardy) (2013)

=== Extended plays ===
- A New Page (as Profitz) (2010)
- Hardy Season (2017)
- The Hollywood EP (2017)

=== Singles ===
==== As lead artist ====
| Title | Year | Peak chart positions | Certifications | Album |
| Title | Year | UK | Certifications | Album |
|---|---|---|---|---|
| "Unsigned" (featuring One Acen) | 2017 | 45 | BPI : Platinum | Non-album singles |
| "Super Soaker" | 2017 | — | BPI: Silver | Non-album singles |
| "Rapper" | 2018 | 34 | BPI: Silver | Non-album singles |
| "Best Life" (featuring One Acen) | 2018 | 26 | BPI: Platinum | Non-album singles |
| "Sponsored" | 2019 | 70 | | Non-album singles |
| "Guten Tag" (featuring DigDat) | 2019 | 18 | BPI: Platinum | Non-album singles |
| "Juicy" (with Darkoo) | 2020 | 62 | | Non-album singles |
| "XYZ" (with SL) | 2020 | 62 | | Non-album singles |
| "See Nobody" (with Wes Nelson) | 2020 | 3 | BPI: Platinum | TBA |
"—" denotes a recording that did not chart or was not released in that territory.

==== As featured artist ====
| Title | Year | Peak chart positions | Album |
| Title | Year | UK | Album |
|---|---|---|---|
| "EIO" (One Acen featuring Hardy Caprio) | 2018 | 90 | Non-album singles |
| "Droptop" (T Mulla featuring Hardy Caprio) | 2019 | 78 | Non-album singles |
