= Baddest Ruffest =

Single by Backyard Dog
- Released: 25 June 2001
- Recorded: 2001
- Genre: Big beat, ragga
- Length: 3:44
- Label: East West Records
- Songwriter(s): Aniff Akinola, Lloyd Hanley
- Producer(s): Aniff Akinola

"Baddest Ruffest" is a 2001 song by Backyard Dog. It made No. 15 on the UK Singles Chart, and was used as Coca-Cola's 2002 FIFA World Cup theme in the UK, and in the films Ali G Indahouse and Bend It Like Beckham.
