= Backyard Dog =

British musical duo

- Origin: Manchester
- Genres: Ragga, dance
- Labels: East West Records
- Members: Aniff Akinola; Lloyd Hanley

Backyard Dog is a musical duo from Manchester, consisting of Aniff Akinola and Lloyd Hanley. The name "backyard dog" comes from when Akinola booted Hanley out of his recording studio, culminating in him saying "you can't treat me like this, you're treating me like a backyard dog".

Their 2001 single, "Baddest Ruffest", reached No. 15 on the UK Singles Chart, and was used as the 2002 FIFA World Cup theme, and in the films Ali G Indahouse and Bend It Like Beckham.
