= Who Do You Think Of? =

Single by M.O

from the EP Who Do You Think Of? and Modus Operandi
- Released: 20 May 2016
- Recorded: 2016
- Length: 3:45
- Label: Operator; Polydor
- Songwriters: Annie Ashcroft; Francesca Connolly; Fred Gibson; Stephen Gibson; Ferdy Unger Hamilton; Nicholas Listrani; Nadine Samuels; Ryan Sudlow
- Producer: FRED

M.O singles chronology
"Preach" (2015)	"Who Do You Think Of?" (2016)	"Not in Love" (2016)

"Who Do You Think Of?" is a song by English girl group M.O. It was released as a digital download on 20 May 2016 in the United Kingdom, as the first single from the band's second EP Who Do You Think Of?. Influenced by dance-pop and tropical house, the song was written by band members Annie Ashcroft, Frankee Connolly and Nadine Samuels along with Ferdy Unger Hamilton, Nicholas Listrani, Ryan Sudlow, and Stephen and Fred Gibson, while production was helmed by the latter. It reached number 18 on the UK Singles Chart, becoming the group's first top 20, as well as top 40 entry. The song was also later included on the group's third EP Modus Operandi.

== Music video ==
A music video for "Who Do You Think Of?" was directed by Charlotte Rutherford and released online alongside the song on 20 May 2016.

== Track listing ==
Digital download
No.	Title	Length
1.	"Who Do You Think Of?"	3:45

Remix EP
No.	Title	Length
1.	"Who Do You Think Of?" (Zac Samuel Remix)	2:47
2.	"Who Do You Think Of?" (Danny Dove Remix)	4:50
3.	"Who Do You Think Of?" (Royal-T Remix)	4:34
4.	"Who Do You Think Of?" (Ed Solo Remix)	4:06

== Charts ==
Chart (2016)	Peak position
Ireland (IRMA)	56
Scottish Singles Sales (Official Charts)	23
UK Singles (Official Charts)	18

== Certifications ==
Certifications for "Who Do You Think Of?"
Region	Certification	Certified units/sales
United Kingdom (BPI)	Platinum	600,000^{‡}
^{‡} Sales+streaming figures based on certification alone.

== Release history ==
Region	Date	Format	Label
United Kingdom	20 May 2016	Digital download	Operator
United Kingdom	15 April 2016	Remix EP	Operator
