= Not in Love (M.O song) =

Single by M.O featuring Kent Jones
- Released: 9 December 2016
- Recorded: 2016
- Genre: Dance-pop
- Length: 3:35
- Label: Operator; Polydor
- Songwriters: Henrik Michelsen; Rachel Keen; Edvard Erfjord; James Bell; Fred Gibson

M.O singles chronology
"Who Do You Think Of?" (2016)	"Not in Love" (2016)	"Bad Vibe" (2018)

Kent Jones singles chronology
"Alright" (2016)	"Not in Love" (2016)	"Sit Down" (2017)

"Not in Love" is a song by English girl group M.O, featuring guest vocals by American rapper Kent Jones. It was released as a digital single on 9 December 2016 in the United Kingdom. It reached number 42 on the UK Singles Chart. This would be the last single to feature original member Frankee Connolly before she departed the band for personal reasons and would be replaced by Chanal Benjilali.

== Music video ==
A music video for "Not in Love" was directed by Charlotte Rutherford and Kate Moross, and released online on 5 January 2017.

== Track listing ==
Digital download
No.	Title	Length
1.	"Not in Love"	3:35

== Charts ==
Chart (2017)	Peak position
Ireland (IRMA)	75
Scotland Singles (OCC)	24
UK Singles (OCC)	42

== Release history ==
Region	Date	Format	Label
United Kingdom	9 December 2016	Digital download	Operator
