= M.O =

English girl group

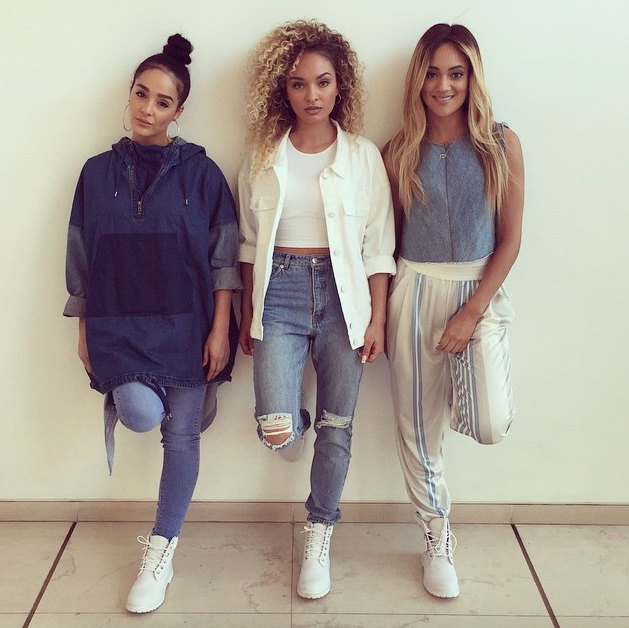
- M.O before a Kiss FM session in 2015

Background information
- Origin: London, England
- Genres: Pop; R&B
- Years active: 2012–2022 (Note: Indefinite hiatus)
- Labels: Operator; Polydor; Interscope
- Spinoff of: Mini Viva
- Members: Annie Ashcroft; Chanal Benjilali
- Past members: Frankee Connolly; Nadine Samuels

M.O are an English girl group consisting of members Annie Ashcroft and Chanal Benjilali, and previously Frankee Connolly until her departure in June 2017 and Nadine Samuels until her departure in 2020. They achieved their breakthrough in 2018 after the release of ‘Bad Vibe’, which reached number 18 in the UK Singles Chart. The group was formed in 2012 by the members themselves, after their previous groups Mini Viva and Duchess had disbanded. Starting out on independent label Operator Records, they have been signed to Polydor Records since early 2016. On 19 October 2020, Nadine Samuels confirmed her departure from the group. The group was last active in 2021.

== Career ==
=== Beginnings ===
Frankee Connolly was a part of Mini Viva until the duo's split in 2010, whereas Nadine Samuels and Annie Ashcroft were both members of the girl group Duchess until 2012. M.O was formed in late 2012, after Connolly met Samuels and Ashcroft at music industry events. M.O stands for Modus Operandi, which is a Latin term for "a particular way to do something." M.O's initial aim was to bring old school 1990s music back, naming TLC, Jennifer Lopez, Aaliyah, and All Saints as an inspiration amongst others.

M.O made their debut as a group with a remix of Brandy and Monica's "The Boy Is Mine" on the YouTube channel SB.TV in 2012. At this point they received positive feedback from the music industry and were championed by the likes of Ed Sheeran. They followed up their debut on YouTube with their first promotional single "Wait Your Turn", which was followed by other releases in 2013, including "Ain't Got Time" and "Hot".

In early 2014, M.O announced that the Jess Glynne-penned track "For a Minute" would be released as their official debut single. It was released in April 2014 and entered the UK Indie Chart at number 6. In May, the group joined Little Mix as the main support act on their sold out Salute Tour, and performed at numerous festivals in the UK, including Wireless Festival. In August, they released their garage-influenced second single "Dance on My Own", which entered the UK Singles Chart at number 49. Also in 2014, the group was nominated for a MOBO Award in the Best Newcomer category.

In 2015, the single "Preach", which was co-written by Starsmith and Joel Compass, was released. The same year, they signed a record deal with Polydor and released the promotional single "Love the Most", a collaboration with the HeavyTrackerz. In 2016, M.O released the extended plays Good Friends and Who Do You Think Of?, the latter of which spawned the single of the same name. "Who Do You Think Of?" reached the top 20 of the UK Singles Chart, becoming their highest-charting single yet. The song was certified silver and sold over 375,000 copies. In July 2016, it was announced that the group signed a US deal with Interscope Records. Their next single, "Not in Love", featured rapper Kent Jones and was released in December 2016, peaking just outside the top 40 at No. 42.

On 26 June 2020, the group released the EP Modus Operandi, featuring tracks such as "Who Do You Think Of", "Ex at the Party" and "Going Out of My Way" featuring Mr Eazi.

=== Line-up changes ===
After a quiet 18 months, including the departure of Connolly, the group made a comeback with their new single "Bad Vibe", featuring Lotto Boyzz and Mr Eazi. It peaked at number 18 on the UK Singles Chart.

During 2020, founding member Nadine Samuels left the group.

=== Final single and split ===
In October 2021, M.O released their first single since the COVID-19 pandemic, "U No" with producer collective Jodapac and British rapper French the Kid.

== Discography ==
=== Extended plays ===
Title	Details
Good Friends	Released: 9 February 2016; Label: Polydor; Format: Digital download
Who Do You Think Of?	Released: 2 August 2016; Label: Polydor; Format: Digital download
Modus Operandi	Released: 26 June 2020; Label: Universal; Format: Digital download

=== Singles ===
==== As lead artists ====
Title	Year	Peak chart positions			Certifications (sales thresholds)	Album
Title	Year	UK	UK Indie	IRE	Certifications (sales thresholds)	Album
"For a Minute"	2014	103	6	—		Non-album singles
"Dance on My Own"	2014	49	4	—		Non-album singles
"Preach"	2015	51	4	—		Non-album singles
"Who Do You Think Of?" (Note: also features on the group's EP Modus Operandi in 2020)	2016	18	—	56	BPI: Platinum	Who Do You Think Of?
"Not in Love" (featuring Kent Jones)	2016	42	—	75		Non-album single
"Bad Vibe" (with Lotto Boyzz and Mr Eazi)	2018	18	—	31	BPI: Platinum	Modus Operandi
"Wondering" (with Chip)	2018	91	—	—		Modus Operandi
"Choose Sides" (featuring AJ Tracey)	2019	—	—	—		Modus Operandi
"Ex at the Party"	2019	—	—	—		Modus Operandi
"Going Out of My Way" (with Mr Eazi)	2020	—	—	—		Modus Operandi
"—" denotes a single that did not chart or was not released.

==== As featured artists ====
Title	Year	Peak chart positions		
Title	Year	UK	UK Indie	IRE
"Running" (USG featuring M.O)	2014	—	—	—
"With You" (DUSK featuring M.O)	2018	—	—	—
"Family Tree" (Remix) (Ramz featuring M.O)	2018	35	—	—
"Feelings (Wifey)" (Crazy Cousinz featuring Yungen and M.O)	2018	—	—	—
"Pon Me" (Abra Cadabra featuring Sneakbo and M.O)	2018	—	—	—
“U No” (Jodapac featuring M.O and French the Kid)	2021	—	—	—
"—" denotes a single that did not chart or was not released.

==== Promotional singles ====
Title	Year
"Wait Your Turn"	2012
"On and On"	2013
"Ain't Got Time"	2013
"Come Let Me Show You"	2013
"Hot"	2013
"On Ya"	2013
"Love the Most"	2015

== Awards and nominations ==
Year	Award	Category	Outcome
2014	MOBO Awards	Best Newcomer	Nominated
2016	MOBO Awards	Best Song	Nominated
