= Bounce 'n' Boom =

Single by Box Bottom
- Released: 2011
- Recorded: 2011
- Genre: Drum and bass, dubstep
- Label: All Around the World

"Bounce 'n' Boom" is a 2011 song by Box Bottom featuring Big Babba. It reached No. 46 on the UK Singles Chart and has been featured in an advert for Vimto soft drinks.
