= Angry Boys =

- Genre: Mockumentary; Sitcom
- Created by: Chris Lilley
- Written by: Chris Lilley
- Directed by: Chris Lilley; Stuart McDonald; Anthony Rose; Jeffrey Walker
- Starring: Chris Lilley
- Theme music composer: Chris Lilley
- Composer: Bryony Marks
- Countries of origin: Australia; United States
- Original language: English
- No. of series: 1
- No. of episodes: 12

Production
- Executive producers: Chris Lilley; Debbie Lee; Laura Waters
- Producers: Chris Lilley; Laura Waters
- Production locations: Melbourne, Australia; Gawler, Australia; Los Angeles, United States; Tokyo, Japan
- Cinematography: Nick Gregoric; Simon Lind
- Editor: Ian Carmichael
- Running time: 28 minutes
- Production companies: Princess Pictures; Australian Broadcasting Corporation; HBO Entertainment

Original release
- Network: HBO (United States); ABC1 (Australia)
- Release: 11 May – 27 July 2011

Related
- We Can Be Heroes; Summer Heights High; Ja'mie: Private School Girl; Jonah from Tonga; Lunatics

Angry Boys is an Australian television mockumentary sitcom miniseries written by and starring Chris Lilley, continuing the mockumentary style of his previous series. In Angry Boys, Lilley plays multiple characters: S.mouse, an American rapper; Jen, a manipulative Japanese mother; Blake Oakfield, a champion surfer; Ruth "Gran" Sims, a guard at a juvenile detention facility; and her teenage grandsons, South Australian twins Daniel and Nathan Sims.

Filmed in Gawler, Melbourne, Los Angeles, and Tokyo, the series is a co-production between the Australian Broadcasting Corporation and American cable channel HBO, with a pre-sale to BBC Three in the United Kingdom. Angry Boys premièred on 11 May 2011 at 9:00 pm on ABC1.

== Production ==
=== Development ===
Executive producers Chris Lilley and Laura Waters brought together the same team of collaborators from Summer Heights High and We Can Be Heroes to create six characters for the series. This included the casting director, director of photography, camera operators, art department, costume designer, make-up artist, location scout, 1st assistant director, composer and editor. On 25 August 2009, The Daily Telegraph reported that Lilley had planned to release a follow-up series to Summer Heights High, after years of working on the format. A casting call was held on 30 September 2009 for roles of an African-American female (aged 18–25) to play a model called LaFonda, an African-American male, (aged 50–65) to play a character called Carter, and a male Japanese-American professional skateboarder, (aged 16–20) to play Corey. On 2 October 2009, it was revealed that Lilley was searching for several American actors to appear in the series. The Australian Broadcasting Corporation (ABC) also released details about the series, confirming that it would be called Angry Boys, and that it would be co-produced by the ABC and American network HBO.

More than 3,500 people auditioned for roles, both actors and non-actors from Australia and overseas to find a wide range of looks, attitudes, races and ages for 89 main roles and 1,228 extras. Angry Boys was filmed over seven months in more than 70 locations across Australia, Los Angeles and Tokyo. The series was edited over a period of 12 months. A preview of the series premiered on 16 March 2011, introducing some of the new characters, and the return of identical twins Daniel and Nathan Sims from We Can Be Heroes. A preview was also shown during the Comic Relief benefit in the United Kingdom on 18 March 2011. During an interview with The Age in May 2011, Waters said that they wanted the series to be a "challenge" to make it more "fun" and believes that they have "taken everything to the next level". Angry Boys premiered on 11 May 2011 at 9:00 pm on ABC1.

=== Music ===
The theme music to Angry Boys was written and produced by Lilley. Bryony Marks, who had been involved in some of the music from Summer Heights High, had helped Lilley arrange the theme music and produced all the incidental music in it. It was recorded over a number of sessions with the Melbourne Symphony Orchestra, with Lilley on grand piano for some pieces. Lilley also wrote and produced all the songs for the series, including S.mouse's rap songs, and recorded them in his home studio.

== Characters ==
There are six main characters featured in Angry Boys, all portrayed by Chris Lilley.

=== Daniel and Nathan Sims ===
Recurring characters from an earlier Chris Lilley series, We Can Be Heroes, Nathan and Daniel are identical 17-year-old twins living on a small farm with their family in the fictional rural town of Dunt, South Australia; Daniel has been the man of the house since their dad died when they were 11. His dream is to rebuild the farm as a working sheep farm and run it with Nathan. Daniel and his mates enjoy doing mainies up and down Dunt's main street using his mum's Nissan Pulsar car. Nathan has only 10% of his hearing and is quiet, lonely and constantly harassed by Daniel; his response to everything is giving the finger. In the twins' bedroom is the "Wall of Legends," pictures of the people they consider their heroes: surfer Blake Oakfield; Japanese skater Tim Okazaki; US rapper S.mouse; bikini model Emily Chase; their late dad; and their Gran.

During the show, Nathan makes a tribute video to S.mouse's song, "Poo on You" and gets himself in trouble with the local Dunt police. His hearing condition worsens and the authorities suggest that he should be sent to a deaf school in Adelaide for a two-year course. Daniel organizes a "legendary" farewell party for Nathan and, enlisting Gran's help, invites all their "Wall of Legends" heroes. Later it's revealed, as she tells Daniel via Skype, that her worsening dementia causes her to forget to invite them. But much to everyone's surprise, Oakfield, Okazaki, and S.mouse actually do show up at the party.

=== S.mouse ===
S.mouse (born Shwayne Jnr.) is a 24-year-old African American rap artist from Los Angeles. He is known for releasing the biggest-selling hip hop single of all time, "Slap My Elbow." Claiming to have been an "underprivileged black kid from the slums," it is revealed by his father, Shwayne Snr. (Richard Lawson), he comes from a wealthy suburban background in Calabasas, California and that he went to a predominantly white private school, sang gospel music at church, and begged him for the Wicked soundtrack. S.mouse spends most of his time hanging out with his best friend Danthony (Clyde Boraine).

During the show, S.mouse finds himself under pressure from his record company over his self-penned YouTube-released song, "Poo on You," the music video for which features him defecating on a police car. He later makes an online apology to his fans and is put under house arrest at his parents' house for two months, during which he receives a demo of the record company's song "Gingerbread S.mouse" and expresses great dislike of the track. He then decides to release a new single called "Grandmother Fucker." The song's music video features an appearance by S.mouse's grandmother, which angers his father. Later his manager phones to inform him that he has been dropped from the record company due to the video receiving a large number of complaints.

S.mouse then sets up a home studio to work on his own music for his new album, The Real Me, to be produced by Danthony and released independently. Following the album's launch to a largely nonplussed crowd, S.mouse realizes that he isn't really expressing the real him and decides to read Daniel's letter about an Aboriginal child named Wally who was crushed by a truck. He writes a song about the incident called "Squashed Nigga" and decides to sing the song instead of rapping it. Following the song's release, S.mouse re-invents himself under the name Shwayne Jnr.

=== Jen Okazaki ===
Jen Okazaki is a soft-spoken Japanese wife and mother of three who moved with her family from Japan to Santa Barbara, California in the United States for a better life. She focuses mainly on turning her first son Tim Okazaki into a skateboarding champion. Deciding that she can promote his career better from Tokyo, she moves the family back to Japan. She markets him not only as a cute Japanese boy but also a homosexual. She builds a successful empire around Tim's skateboarding success, "GayStyle Enterprises," in which she sells phallic whistles, perfume dispensers, water bottles and scrubbing brushes.

During the show, Jen takes Tim to doctors and finds out that he is overworked and depressed. She tries to get him more relaxed and decides to take on some of his responsibilities. She also gets him a dog she names "Gay Dog" which she claims is "the first ever gay dog." Jen wants him to become best friends with the Gay Dog and to teach him how to skate. Later on, Tim reveals to his fans on his website that he is straight and has a girlfriend with whom he has been having a secret relationship for several months. In a fit of anger Jen runs away from home leaving a note behind which threatens that she will kill herself and Gay Dog if Tim doesn't reclaim he is gay. Jen is later dumped as Tim's manager and is replaced by Bruce (Billy Loh). They all move back to Santa Barbara and live in separate houses. Tim gets his own home near the beach and buys a single-family residence for Jen, his father, and his two younger siblings. Jen does not enjoy the suburban lifestyle and hates being a stay-at-home mom. Not accepting defeat, Jen begins training her second son, Luke, to become the next golfing superstar.

=== Gran ===
Ruth Sims, commonly referred to as "Gran," is Daniel and Nathan's 65-year-old grandmother who works as a prison officer at the Sydney Garingal Juvenile Justice Centre for teenage boys, where she has been employed for 25 years. She lives in a house on the premises with her co-worker Penny (Alison Roy). Gran describes herself as being "tough" and likes to think she is a mother figure for the inmates. She demonstrates her feelings of love and care in myriad ways, for example through insults and swearing in a manner similar to that of a drill sergeant. She does, however, care deeply for the boys and serves as a confidant. Gran also looks after 23 guinea pigs; Pauline, Patch, Lucy, Henry, Fudge, Narelle, Jaffles, Kerry Anne, Ken, Ruffles, Princess Mary, Courtney, Keith, Pia and the Babies, Trizzy, Joyce, Darrel, Sonia, Ratty, Bok Choy and Parsley. Her favorite is named after the television presenter Kerri-Anne.

During the show she displays a lack of political correctness. During the first episode she divides the inmates into two teams of "light skins" and "dark skins" for a football game. She makes statements like, "I thought wogs were good at soccer." and "Get your lazy aboriginal ass up off the couch." Gran also plays her favorite game with the boys called "gotcha," in which she tricks one of the inmates into believing that he's about to be released, and practical jokes that an inmate has gotten the news he'll be executed via the Electric Chair, then says "Gotcha." She also keeps them entertained with "Friday Night Song Night," where she performs various songs. Gran forms a close bond with new inmate Talib (Jake Glass), who was sent to the Garingal Juvenile Justice Centre for "wanking a dog." She tries to help make his life easier as the others bully and harass him for being too quiet and reserved. Gran reveals to Talib that she has Alzheimer's disease after he claims his mother doesn't visit him because she hates him and in a bid to get him to open up to her.

Later on, her guinea pig Kerri-Anne is found dead near the guinea pig hutches. Believing that Talib caused her death, the other inmates bully him more than ever. Finally pushed to his limit, he beats up another named inmate Marlon and Gran is forced to give him two days in solitary confinement. Gran mistakenly gives Talib and Justin, another solitary confinement inmate, extra bed sheets, which Justin uses for a suicide attempt. Now worried that Talib will do the same, Gran removes him from solitary confinement early. Garingal's head officer informs her that she must retire due to her worsening Alzheimer's symptoms as evidenced by her unwitting enabling of Justin's botched suicide attempt. She moves to Dunt to live with her family.

=== Blake Oakfield ===
Blake Oakfield is a 38-year-old former champion surfer from the fictional town of Narmucca Bay, New South Wales, now a husband and a stepfather of two. He's dedicated to the surf gang he founded as a young man, the Mucca Mad Boys. Many of Narmucca's locals dislike him and his gang because they're known to cause trouble. Oakfield feels that his surfing career wasn't the same after he had his testicles shot and amputated after a gang fight with their enemy, the Fennel Hell Men, so he quit. He claims that his current occupation is keeping Narmucca Bay safe from the Fennel Hell Men.

During the show Oakfield sets up a Fat Boys Surf School to not only teach young boys to enjoy the beauty of the ocean and to improve their confidence. But when one of the boys gets injured, Oakfield cancels the school. He ends up getting arrested after wrongly being accused of shooting Packo (Gareth Haeberle), the Fennel Hell Men's leader. His pregnant wife Kareena (Sarah Sutherland) eventually leaves him and goes to Sydney with their children. Oakfield's mate Hunter (Paul Pearson) moves in with him and he and the other Mucca Mad Boys try to cheer up Oakfield, who is distraught about losing his family.

After attending the court case hearing with Packo, it is revealed that Oakfield's mate and former Mucca Mad Boy member, Ashley (Christian Stack), was responsible for the shooting and is sent back to prison. Oakfield undergoes the artificial testicles operation and reopens the Fat Boys Surf School with the other Mucca Mad Boys members helping out. Kareena also returns and has already given birth to their third child, Tyrone. Oakfield decides to surf again and wants to do the Billabong Legends of Surfing Tour. He believes that his new artificial testicles have made him confident again.

=== Other characters ===
- Kerry (Debbie Jones) – Daniel and Nathan's mother.
- Steve (Greg Fairall) – Kerry's husband, Daniel and Nathan's step-father.
- Tyson (Liam Keltie) – Daniel and Nathan's younger brother.
- Jamie (Samuel Cooke) – Daniel and Nathan's younger brother.
- Julia (Virginia Cashmere) – Daniel and Nathan's younger sister.
- Tim Okazaki (Jordan Dang) – The son of Jen Okazaki. Jen is Tim's manager and she trains and pushes him into becoming a skateboarding champion. Jen markets him as a cute Japanese boy and a homosexual. However, during the show Tim reveals he's actually American, speaks with a fake Japanese accent, and is not gay at all. Tim struggles to reconcile his mother with the desire to be a normal teenager.
- Danthony (Clyde Boraine) – S.mouse's best friend. He spends most of his time hanging out with S.mouse, and also is his producer when S.mouse is dropped by his record label.
- Lasquisha (Kristin Dione Metoyer) – S.mouse's girlfriend until episode 10.
- Shwayne Senior (Richard Lawson) – S.mouse's father.
- Talib (Jake Glass) – A new inmate at the Garingal Juvenile Justice Centre who rarely speaks. He is constantly bullied by the other inmates for masturbating a dog and is known as a "Dog Wanker". During the show, Talib forms a close bond with Gran.
- Kareena (Sarah Sutherland) – Blake's wife and mother of three. Kareena was pregnant over the majority of the series, but by the final episode she had already given birth to their third child, Tyrone.
- Hunter (Paul Pearson) – Blake's best mate and the second founding member of the surf gang, the Mucca Mad Boys. He is often found hanging out with Blake and has a Mucca Mad Boys tattoo.
- Penny (Alison Roy) – Works at the Garingal Juvenile Justice Centre. Penny is often nicknamed "Legs" due to her extreme height. She used to live and work with Gran, before Gran was forced to leave.

== Episodes ==
No.	Title	Written by	Original release date	Australian viewers
1	"Episode 1"	Chris Lilley	11 May 2011	1,368,000
Nathan and Daniel Sims are identical twin brothers who reside with their family in the small town of Dunt, South Australia. When Nathan and Daniel finish school, they intend to pursue their father's dream of running a successful farm. Nathan and Daniel introduce their "Wall of Legends", which consists of photos, upon their bedroom wall, of people who they consider to be "absolute legends". Significant people on the "Wall of Legends" include their father, Gran, S.mouse and Blake Oakfield. Nathan's "Wall of Legends" is primarily made up of female models. To Nathan and Daniel's displeasure, their mother's boyfriend, Steve, moves into their household. A phone call from a hearing specialist reveals that Nathan's hearing is worsening and he will soon become profoundly deaf. Gran, the grandmother of Nathan and Daniel, is an officer at the Garingal Juvenile Justice Centre. She describes herself as tough, yet a mother figure for the boys. She displays a lack of political correctness as she divides the inmates into two teams of "light skins" and "dark skins" for a soccer game. Gran also plays her favourite game with the boys called "gotcha", in which she tricks one of them into believing that he is about to be released. She also keeps the inmates entertained with "Friday Night Song Night", where she performs various songs. Gran lives in a house within the premises with fellow officer, Penny. Gran looks after 23 guinea pigs and her favourite is named Kerrie-Anne
2	"Episode 2"	Chris Lilley	18 May 2011	1,346,000
American rap artist S.mouse has found himself under pressure from his record label over his self-penned YouTube released "Poo on You". The music video sees S.mouse defecating on a police car. He later makes an online apology to his fans and is tagged and put under house arrest at his parents' house for two months. Nathan makes a tribute video to "Poo on You" and gets himself in trouble with the local Dunt police. His hearing condition is worsening and the authorities suggest that Nathan should be sent to a deaf school in Adelaide for a two-year course. Daniel is not dealing with it well and wants Nathan to stay. Meanwhile new inmate, Talib, arrives at the Garingal Juvenile Justice Centre. When the other inmates find out that he is there for sexual offences against animals, he is bullied by them and they call him the "dog wanker".
3	"Episode 3"	Chris Lilley	25 May 2011	805,000
Daniel organises "Nathan's Legendary Farewell Party" before he leaves for deaf school. Daniel plans to invite all of the legends from his "Wall of Legends" to the party, including S.mouse, Blake Oakfield and Emily Chase. Gran agrees to email their managers. Steve later tells Daniel that Chase has declined the invitation. Blake Oakfield, one of the legends on Daniel's "Wall of Legends", is a 38-year-old champion surfer from Narmucca Bay, New South Wales. He is a father of two with a pregnant wife, and he is dedicated to the surf gang he founded as a young man, the Mucca Mad Boys. Many of the locals within Narmucca Bay dislike Oakfield and his gang because they are known to cause trouble. After having his testicles shot and amputated as a result of a gang fight with the Fennel Hell Men, Oakfield felt his surfing career wasn't the same anymore and decided to quit. He claims that his current occupation is keeping Narmucca Bay safe from the Fennel Hell Men. Meanwhile, S.mouse who is still under house arrest, receives a demo from his manager, Larry, and he expresses great dislike of the track. S.mouse decides to release a new single called "Grandmother Fucker", and he gets his best friend, Danthony, to upload the music video online. The video features an appearance by S.mouse's grandmother, which angers his father, Shwayne Senior. S.mouse later receives a phone call from his manager that he has been dropped from his record label due to the video receiving so many complaints.
4	"Episode 4"	Chris Lilley	1 June 2011	920,000
After hearing that Chase won't be attending his "Legendary Farewell Party", Nathan decides he wants to invite skateboarding champion, Tim Okazaki, and gets Gran to send him an invitation. Daniel is frustrated when he finds out Nathan has used up all the Internet download usage downloading pornography. He is also annoyed to find Nathan masturbating on the computer chair and during the night, and decides to come up with solution to stop Nathan from obsessive masturbating. He then decides that the best solution is to tape plastic bottles onto Nathan's hands. Tim Okazaki is a Japanese teenage boy, who has become the world's first gay skateboarder, and is a huge star in Japan. His mother, Jen Okazaki, is his manager and a mother of three. Jen moved with her family to America for a better life for her children. She realises that Tim's career can be better promoted from Tokyo if she markets him as not only as a cute Japanese boy, but also as a homosexual. However, Tim reveals he's actually American, speaks with a fake Japanese accent, and is not gay at all. Jen owns a successful empire called, "GayStyle Enterprises", in which she sells penis-shaped whistles, perfume dispensers, water bottles and scrubbing brushes. Blake's laid-back beach life-style is threatened by his wife demanding he pick up the groceries, and the Fennel Hell Men wanting to surf at 'Mucca Mad Boys' break.
5	"Episode 5"	Chris Lilley	8 June 2011	848,000
S.mouse creates a home studio to work on his own music for his new album, The Real Me. The album will be released independently and is executively produced by his best friend, Danthony. S.mouse has decided he wants Barbadian singer Rihanna to feature on his new song, "Big Black Balls". His girlfriend, Lasquisha, reveals she wants to sing on the song instead. After refusing to let her sing on "Big Black Balls", S.mouse soon finds out that he has no choice but to let Lasquisha sing on the song or else she will sue him. Meanwhile, the deaf school that Nathan will soon be attending, suggests he should spend a day with a deaf family. During the family's visit to their home, Nathan asks Daniel to meet him outside. Although Daniel cannot find Nathan, he soon appears to be standing near the water tank and urinates all over Daniel, who decides to get revenge. Later, Daniel tricks Nathan into drinking his Gatorade. Before Nathan drinks it, he realises it is Daniel's urine and spills the drink all over Daniel's bed. Jen trains Tim everyday to keep fit. During one of their training sessions, Jen uses one of her exercise techniques with Tim, which is to make him fart.
6	"Episode 6"	Chris Lilley	15 June 2011	569,000
Blake and his mate, Hunter, decide to start up a surf school for fat boys. Blake sees it as a way to get the boys' confidence up. During one of their training sessions, Julian gets injured and is taken to the hospital. Blake later gets a call from the hospital that Julian will be ok. Daniel and Nathan's mum and Steve go away for the long weekend and Daniel is left to babysit his brothers and sister. Daniel throws a party for all the teenagers in Dunt. During the party, Nathan's arm gets stuck in a drain pipe, leaving Daniel with no choice but to call his mum to come back home from their long weekend holiday. Steve cuts off the pipe with a saw. They later announce that during their holiday, they got engaged and are getting married. Meanwhile, back at the Garingal Juvenile Justice Centre, the inmates are still bullying Talib for being a "dog wanker". Talib still hasn't spoken since he first arrived at the centre. Gran tries to get him to speak by letting him feed her guinea pigs and sing at the "Friday Night Song Night". However, Talib still doesn't speak. Every month, Gran gets a young boy visitor to the centre and shows him around the place. She likes to frighten the visitor by getting the inmates to dress up scary and pretend that they are slaves. However, the visitor sees Talib riding a scooter and realises that they are only pretending. Gran gets angry at Talib and tells him that he is an "idiot" and needs to "grow some balls". Gran gets in trouble from an officer at the centre and is forced to apologize to Talib. After apologizing, Talib begins to speak.
7	"Episode 7"	Chris Lilley	22 June 2011	634,000
Jen is worried that Tim has been aggressive lately, his skating is not as good, he isn't concentrating on school work and is falling asleep most times. She takes Tim to the doctors to see whats wrong, and finds out that he is overworked and depressed. Jen tries to get him more relaxed and says she will take some of his responsibilities. She gets Tim a dog named "Gay Dog", apparently the first ever gay dog. Jen wants Tim to become best friends with the dog and to teach it how to skate. Meanwhile, S.mouse performs "Slap My Elbow" and a new song at an elementary school, although the children don't seem interested. Lasquisha tells S.mouse that they don't know him and he'll already be forgotten once his house arrest is over. S.mouse goes to the mall, even though he is not allowed to leave the house, to prove that he is still famous. However, no one cares that he is there and Lasquisha asks people if they know him, they say no. When they arrive home, a parole officer tightens the security on S.mouse's ankle monitor. If he walks out the gate, he will get electrocuted. S.mouse spends the afternoon writing a new song called "Whack My Knee" and Lasquisha comes up with a dance craze for the song. Daniel's mum makes a threat to him that if he continues to use the word "fag", then he would have to spend the day with Henry Keddys, a homosexual teenager from Dunt. Daniel almost immediately says the word again and ends up spending the day with Henry. He doesn't seem too interested in hanging with Henry, but they become friends after Daniel learns that he is friends with a pair of attractive girls from Dunt. Nathan invites Daniel's mates over; thinking that Daniel would be embarrassed. However, after finding out that Henry is friends with the girls, they too accept him.
8	"Episode 8"	Chris Lilley	29 June 2011	591,000
Gran organizes "Family Day", an event that occurs four times a year. The inmates get to invite their families to the event and tell them what it is like living in Juvenile Centre. Talib's mother doesn't turn up and Gran is seen to be forgetting things. Afterwards, Gran and Talib reveal their deep darkest secrets to each other, where Talib claims that his mother didn't turn up because she hates him and Gran reveals she has Alzheimer's disease. Meanwhile, Blake's former Mucca Mad Boy member, Ashley, has just came out of prison and visits him. Ashley expresses a wish to punish Packo for causing Blake to lose his testicles. He borrows Blake's van so he can visit the people he knows. Blake is later arrested after it is revealed Packo has been shot and is in intensive care. The police claim to have seen Blake's van drive away from the shooting, leaving them to suspect he was involved. However, Blake was at home with Kareena the whole night and Ashley was the one who actually committed the crime. Daniel is jealous of Nathan's popularity with the girls. After three failed attempts at trying to score a date with Chloe Gary, who works at the local video store, Daniel pretends to be Nathan. He then calls Chloe claiming that he is Nathan and asks her out. Chloe tells him to meet her at the store. However, she knew it was Daniel all along and tells him to go away.
9	"Episode 9"	Chris Lilley	6 July 2011	391,000
Tim is filming a commercial for Ooshi Cola (an endorsement Jen had tried to get for several months) but Jen insists on having a stunt double doing Tim's skateboard scene and having Tim shirtless and oiled. Frustrated, Tim storms out of the studio. Later, to Jen's anger, he reveals to his 500,000 fans on his website that he is straight and has a girlfriend, with whom he has been having a relationship secretly for several months. Blake is released from prison on bail and Ashley is reimprisoned, however, Blake still has a court date. Kareena eventually left Blake after arguments and went to Sydney, taking their children with them. Hunter moves in with Blake and he and the other Mucca Mad Boys attempt to cheer Blake up, who is upset at losing his family. Blake later reveals that, to try win Kareena back, he will enter the Billabong Legends of Surfing Tour he had previously declined to enter, and will also undergo the artificial balls transplant. Nathan runs away from home after Daniel teases him about his school uniform for his deaf school. Daniel gets his mate, Black Daniel to help him look for Nathan, using Black Daniel's Aboriginal tracking ability, eventually heading to a lake where they assume Nathan drowned in. Upon returning home, they discover that Nathan was in fact hiding in a cupboard praying, not wanting to go to his deaf school after all. Nathan gets revenge on Daniel for his teasing by uploading photos of a naked baby Daniel to his Myspace profile.
10	"Episode 10"	Chris Lilley	13 July 2011	453,000
Daniel is told that Gran has received RSVP's from both Blake Oakfield and Tim regarding their invitations to Nathan's "Legendary Farewell Party", but has yet to receive a response from S.mouse. After seeing a near-truck crash, Daniel and his mate Black Daniel make up a story about an Aborigine child named Wally being crushed by the truck and send an e-mail about it to S.mouse, hoping it will convince him to attend the party. Kerry and Steve are married in their home backyard, and Daniel and his mates, and Nathan provide the entertainment at the wedding. S.mouse has a week of house arrest left, and spends it doing photo-shoots for his soon to be released independent album, The Real Me. During the photo-shoot, a paparazzi helicopter secretly takes photos of S.mouse shirtless and puts them online, claiming that he has become fat. S.mouse later finds out that Lasquisha has dumped him, not wanting to be associated with someone believed to be fat. Danthony and S.mouse later read the letter Daniel sent him. Gran's prize guinea pig, Kerri-Anne, is found dead near the guinea pig hutches. Talib is believed to be the cause of her death by the other inmates, who bully him even more. He is finally pushed to his limit and beats up bully Marlon, forcing Gran to give him two days in the Isolation Unit. Gran mistakenly gives Talib and Justin, another inmate in the Isolation Unit, extra bedsheets, resulting in a suicide attempt by Justin. Worried that Talib will do the same thing, Gran removes him from the Isolation Unit early, and is informed by the head officer of Garingal that she may have to retire.
11	"Episode 11"	Chris Lilley	20 July 2011	465,000
Gran is informed that she must retire from Garingal due to her Alzheimer's disease. After parting ways with Penny and Talib, she attends a surprise farewell party held for her by the inmates. Gran decides to move to Dunt to live with her family. Nathan teaches his family some select sign language, while Daniel and his mates continue to prepare for Nathan's "Legendary Farewell Party". However, during a Skype talk with Gran, Daniel is informed about her disease, which made Gran forget to send the invitations to Blake and Tim about the party. Since Tim announced he was not gay and in fact, has a girlfriend named Omeya, the 6 million dollar Ooshi Cola ad campaign was cancelled and GayStyle Enterprises has been low on sales, which is upsetting Jen. She later runs away from home, leaving a note saying she will kill herself and Gay Dog if Tim doesn't reclaim he is gay. Tim and Bruce later find Jen hiding at a hotel. Tim tells Jen that he plans to dump her as his manager, and will be replaced by Bruce. S.mouse launches his new album, The Real Me, at a club in Los Angeles to a crowd who are less than pleased. Realising that he isn't really expressing the real him, S.mouse reads Daniel's letter again about an Aborigine child named Wally who was crushed by a truck. He writes a song about the incident called "Squashed Nigga", and decides to sing the song instead of rapping it.
12	"Episode 12"	Chris Lilley	27 July 2011	612,000
S.mouse's house arrest is finally over and he can now move back home to his mansion. As he nervously awaits the reaction to his new single, "Squashed Nigga", S.mouse reveals that he's name is now Shwayne Jnr., and that there will be no more S.mouse. After hours of waiting to hear the single on the radio, S.mouse's father, Shwayne Snr., believes no one will play it, and tells S.mouse that he should get a real job instead. However, they later hear "Squashed Nigga" on the radio, and his father responds with happiness. Blake attends the court case hearing with Packo, and it is revealed that Ashley was sent back to prison after telling the truth about the shooting. Blake undergoes the artificial balls operation, and reopens the Fat Boys Surf School with the other Mucca Mad Boys members helping out. Kareena is also back and has already given birth to their third child, Tyrone. Blake has decided to surf again and wants to do the Billabong Legends of Surfing Tour. He believes that his artificial balls has made him confident again. The Okazaki family have left Japan and have moved back to Santa Barbara, California. Tim is glad to back with his old friends, and is skating more than he did in Japan. He lives in his own house and is now managed by Bruce, while Jen and the rest of the family live in a separate house that Tim bought for her. Jen does not enjoy the suburban lifestyle and hates being a household mum; however, she has begun training her second son, Luke, to become the next golfing superstar. Gran is now living with her family in Dunt, and Daniel is depressed that the legends won't be attending Nathan's farewell party. The day before Nathan leaves, Daniel takes him on a final tour of Dunt, which includes visiting the tree where their father died in a car crash. During the party, Daniel sends Nathan to get some lighters to burn the sign they had made for their intended plan to run the farm together. As Nathan is getting the lighters, Blake, S.mouse and Tim suddenly arrive at the Sims household, to the family's amazement.

== Merchandise ==
S.mouse's song "Animal Zoo" was made available for digital download on the Australian iTunes Store on 26 May 2011. Another one of his songs, "Slap My Elbow" was released on 8 June 2011. The song debuted at number 93 on the Australian ARIA Singles Chart on 13 June 2011, and peaked at number 37 the following week. It also peaked at number 13 on the ARIA Urban Singles Chart. S.mouse's third single, "Squashed Nigga", was released on 21 July 2011. It debuted at number 22 on the ARIA Urban Singles Chart, and has since peaked at #18.

Following the broadcast of the last episode on 27 July 2011, the series' soundtrack was released the next day. It featured seventeen of S.mouse's songs, as well as the Angry Boys opening theme song, and nineteen videos. The album debuted at number 75 on the ARIA Albums Chart (on which it has since entered the top 50 and peaked at #36), and number 16 on the ARIA Urban Albums Chart, where it has since peaked at #9. The series was also released on DVD, featuring twelve of its episodes, deleted scenes, bloopers, and S.mouse music videos. The soundtrack would win the ARIA Award for Best Original Soundtrack Album on 27 November 2011.

== Australian broadcast ==
=== Reception ===
Angry Boys has received generally negative reviews. The show's premiere was highly anticipated, with "Angry Boys" and "Gran" becoming worldwide trending topics on Twitter as the first episode went to air. It was met with enthusiasm by many, who declared it "worth the wait", but others complained about excessive swearing and a general lack of funniness. It was also criticised on talkback radio the next day, with some callers describing it as "racist, homophobic, and offensive". Among critics, the premiere episode also garnered a mixed reception. Karl Quinn of The Age wrote, "Chris Lilley's Angry Boys is bold, aggressive, unafraid to trample on some very shaky ground. But on the basis of last night's opening episode, it's hard to conclude that it's especially funny. Yet." Darren Devlyn of News.com.au said that it had "flashes of artistic brilliance" but felt "disappointed that there weren't more laughs." Holly Byrnes and Shoba Rao of The Daily Telegraph praised the show, writing, "pushing the boundaries of political correctness to breaking point, Lilley has delivered exactly what his fans expect – and why TV critics have hailed him an 'outrageous comic genius'." However, they also expressed concerns that younger viewers would not grasp the show's satirical nature.

=== Ratings ===
The premiere episode of Angry Boys achieved an audience of 1,368,000. It also served as ABC1's most popular program of 2011. The second episode saw a slight drop in ratings with 1,346,000 viewers, although the series remained the highest-rated show in its timeslot. The third episode only managed 805,000 viewers and placed fourteenth overall for the night. It aired simultaneously with the State of Origin Rugby League, which topped the nights overall ratings.

The fourth episode reached an audience of 920,000. The fifth episode only managed 848,000 viewers and placed sixteenth overall for the night. The sixth episode had 569,000 viewers tuning in. The seventh episode picked up slightly in viewers from the previous week with 634,000 tuning in, however, the eighth episode dropped to 591,000 viewers. The ninth episode reached an audience of 391,000, becoming the lowest ratings for an episode of the series, although it aired against the third and final State of Origin game for 2011, which achieved close to 2.5 million viewers nationwide. The tenth episode picked up slightly with 453,000 viewers and was ranked twenty-third overall. The eleventh episode achieved an audience of 465,000. The twelfth and final episode picked up slightly in viewers from the previous four weeks, with 612,000 viewers tuning in.

== International syndication ==
Country	Broadcasters	Time slot	Notes
Australia	ABC1, ABC2, The Comedy Channel	Wednesdays 9:00 pm	Premiered 11 May 2011. Repeats are shown on ABC2 and The Comedy Channel.
Czech Republic	HBO Comedy	Mondays-Wednesdays 8:00 pm	Premiered 14 May 2012.
Belgium	Prime	Thursday 10:30 pm	Premiered 5 July 2012.
New Zealand	Comedy Central	Mondays 9:00 pm	Premiered 2011.
United Kingdom	BBC Three	Tuesdays 10:30 pm	Premiered 7 June 2011.
United States	HBO	Sundays 10:00 pm	Premiered 1 January 2012.
Germany	Sky Atlantic	Wednesdays 10:30 pm	Premiered 26 June 2013.
Sweden	Sveriges Television	Saturdays different times	Premiered 18 January 2014.
France	Jimmy		Premiered in 2014.

== DVD and Blu-ray release ==
Angry Boys
Set details	Special features
12 episodes; 3 disc set; 16:9 aspect ratio; Subtitles: yes; English (5.1 surround); Total running time: 360 minutes	Deleted scenes and bloopers; S.mouse music videos
Release dates
Region 4 – 28 July 2011; Region 2 – 15 August 2011; Region 1 – 4 December 2012

Angry Boys - Special Edition
Set details	Special features
12 episodes; 4 disc set; 16:9 aspect ratio; Subtitles: yes; English (5.1 surround) (DTS-HD Master Audio for Blu-ray release); Total running time: 968 minutes	Deleted scenes and bloopers; S.mouse music videos; Behind the scenes; S.mouse live concert
Release dates
Region 4 – 1 December 2011 (DVD and Blu-ray)
