= Bass Cannon =

Single by Flux Pavilion
- Released: 19 March 2011
- Recorded: 2010
- Genre: Dubstep
- Length: 5:10
- Label: Circus Records
- Songwriter(s): Joshua Steele

Flux Pavilion singles chronology
| "I Can't Stop" (2010) | "Bass Cannon" (2011) | "Jump Back" (2011) |

"Bass Cannon" is a song by English dubstep producer and DJ Flux Pavilion. The song was released in the United Kingdom on 19 March 2011 for digital download. The single peaked at number 56 on the UK Singles Chart, number 9 on the UK Dance Chart and number 5 on the UK Indie Chart.

== Track listings ==
Digital download
| No. | Title | Length |
|---|---|---|
| 1. | "Bass Cannon" | 5:10 |

== Chart performance ==
| Chart (2011) | Peak position |
|---|---|
| UK Dance (OCC) | 9 |
| UK Indie (OCC) | 5 |
| UK Singles (The Official Charts Company) | 56 |

== Release history ==
| Region | Date | Format | Label |
|---|---|---|---|
| United Kingdom | 19 March 2011 | Digital download | Circus Records |
