= Aniff Akinola =

British DJ and rapper

- Born: Aniff Akinola; 1 September 1962 (age 63); Manchester, United Kingdom
- Formerly of: Chapter and the Verse, Backyard Dog

Aniff Akinola (born 1 September 1962) is a British DJ and rapper.

He was a founding member of the cult Mancunian hip-hop group Chapter and the Verse and was a member of Backyard Dog whose song "Baddest Ruffest" made No. 15 on the UK Singles Chart which was used as Coca-Cola's 2002 FIFA World Cup theme in the UK and in the films Ali G Indahouse and Bend It Like Beckham.

On his own, his song "Bounce 'n' Boom" featuring Big Babba, recorded under the alias of Box Bottom, reached No. 46 on the UK Singles Chart and has been featured in an advert for Vimto soft drinks.

In addition, he co-produced the Urban Cookie Collective hit "The Key the Secret" and the A Guy Called Gerald hit "Voodoo Ray", and rapped on the Kirsty MacColl hit "Walking Down Madison".
