= I Wanna Go on You =

"I Wanna Go On You"

Single by Keith Lemon
- Released: 1 June 2013
- Recorded: 2013
- Genre: Pop, R&B, Soul
- Length: 3:55
- Label: FremantleMedia
- Songwriters: Leigh Francis; Thomas Sylvanus Stewart

"I Wanna Go On You" is a single by television personality Keith Lemon. It debuted at No. 52 on the UK Singles Chart. Profits from it go towards Text Santa. Said Lemon of the song:

“Music has always been me main passion. That and women. I still love doing telly but I'm hoping to smash the music world's back doors off. And it's all for a good cause, my payment is the privilege to express meself musically.”

— Keith Lemon

== Music video ==
A music video, starring Keith, Gareth Gates and Billy Ocean, was produced.

== Charts ==
Chart (2013)	Peak position
Scotland Singles (OCC)	80
UK Indie (OCC)	7
UK Singles (OCC)	52
