= Hard Road to Travel =

Single by Jimmy Cliff

Song by Jimmy Cliff

from the album Jimmy Cliff
- A-side: "Wonderful World, Beautiful People"
- Released: 1967
- Recorded: 1967
- Genre: Reggae
- Length: 2:36
- Label: Trojan Records
- Songwriter(s): Lloyd Chambers
- Producer(s): Leslie Kong

Hard Road to Travel is a song by Jimmy Cliff. It gave its name to a 1967 album of the same name and appeared on Cliff's next two albums, "Can't Get Enough Of It" and Jimmy Cliff. In addition, it was featured as the B-side to his singles I Got A Feeling (I Can't Stop) and Wonderful World, Beautiful People.

== Rachel K Collier cover version ==
When Hard Road to Travel was covered by Rachel K Collier, it made #79 on the UK Singles Chart after being featured in a QualitySolicitors advert.
