= Ray Foxx =

- Born: 10 December 1985; London, England
- Genres: Dance, House
- Occupations: Producer, DJ
- Instruments: Keyboards, turntables
- Years active: 2011–present
- Labels: Defected, Strictly Rhythm
- Website: Official Website

Ray Foxx (born 10 December 1985) is an English DJ and music producer who is best known for his hit single "Boom Boom (Heartbeat)" which has peaked at number 12 on the UK Singles Chart.

== Music career ==
=== 2011–12: Early career ===
In July 2011 Ray Foxx released his debut single "The Trumpeter" through Defected Records. The track gained radio support from the likes of Annie Mac, Trevor Nelson, Zane Lowe and DJ Target. In September 2011 he re-released the single as "La Musica (The Trumpeter)", featuring vocals from Lovelle. The new vocal version became his first charting single peaking at number 65 in the UK Singles Chart. The song also received success charting at number 15 in the UK Dance Chart and number 9 in the UK Indie Chart, as well as topping the UK Indie Breakers Chart. In April 2012 he released the single "Butterflies".

=== 2013–present: Breakthrough ===
Newly signed to the Strictly Rhythm label, he released the single "Boom Boom (Heartbeat)" in August 2013. The song features vocals from Rachel K Collier. The song has peaked to number 12 on the UK Singles Chart, making it his first UK Top 20 single. The song has also peaked to number 2 on the UK Dance Chart and number 13 on the Scottish Singles Chart. His follow-up single, "Fireworks (Bang Bang)", featuring vocalist and fellow Londoner J Warner, was released mid-December the same year.

== Discography ==
=== Singles ===
Year	Title	Peak chart positions				Album
Year	Title	UK	UK Dance	SCO	BEL (VL)	Album
2011	"The Trumpeter"	—	—	—	78	Non-album singles
2011	"La Musica (The Trumpeter)" (featuring Lovelle)	65	15	—	—	Non-album singles
2012	"Butterflies"	—	—	—	—	Non-album singles
2013	"Boom Boom (Heartbeat)" (featuring Rachel K Collier)	12	2	13	29	Non-album singles
2013	"Fireworks (Bang Bang)" (featuring J Warner)	—	—	—	—	Non-album singles
2014	"The Only Way" (with Tom Piper featuring Ayah Marar)	—	—	—	—	Non-album singles
2014	"Curious" (featuring Rachel K Collier)	—	—	—	—	Non-album singles
"—" denotes single that did not chart or was not released in that territory.
