= Squashed Nigga =

Single by S.mouse

from the album Angry Boys Official Soundtrack
- Released: 21 July 2011
- Genre: R&B, hip hop
- Length: 3:27

S.mouse singles chronology
"Slap My Elbow" (2011)	"Squashed Nigga" (2011)	"Animal Zoo" (2011)

"Squashed Nigga" is a song performed by fictional character, S.mouse (played by Chris Lilley), of the Australian television series Angry Boys. It was released for digital download on 21 July 2011.

== Context ==
"Squashed Nigga" was first featured in the eleventh episode of the Australian mockumentary series, Angry Boys, and was sung by comedian Chris Lilley (S.mouse), who starred as the six main characters in the series. During the episode, S.mouse arrives back home, after launching his new album, The Real Me, at a club in Los Angeles, California, to a crowd who are less than pleased. He realises that he is not expressing the real him, and decides to read Daniel's (another fictional character portrayed by Lilley) letter about an Aboriginal child named Wally who was crushed by a truck. S.mouse then writes a song about the incident called "Squashed Nigga", and instead of rapping on the song, he decides to sing it.

== Release ==
"Squashed Nigga" was released as the third single off the Angry Boys official soundtrack album on 21 July 2011.

Chris Lilley announced on his Twitter page that "Squashed Nigga" was available for download in the iTunes Store in the United States on 7 February 2012, less than a week before the Angry Boys finale was set to air in the United States.

== Controversy ==
On 29 July 2017, a version of the track was reposted on Lilley's Instagram feed. It coincided with protests over the death of Elijah Doughty around Australia. Several artists, comedians and others criticised Lilley over this, and he subsequently deleted it and apologised.

== Track listing ==
- Digital download
1. "Squashed Nigga" – 3:27

== Charts ==
Chart (2011)	Peak position
ARIA Singles Chart	70
ARIA Urban Singles Chart	22
