= Droideka =

British record producer

- Born: Ellis James Carter; 1994 (age 31–32)
- Origin: Royston, United Kingdom
- Genres: EDM; trap; grime; dubstep
- Years active: 2011-present
- Label: Island Records

Ellis James Carter (born 1994), professionally known as Droideka, is a British former record producer and electronic music producer, from Royston, England. He is known for his 2011 track "Get Hyper", featuring KSI, which spent 11 weeks in the UK Official Singles Chart, peaking at number 29, after its re-release in 2013. After attempting a music career, he resigned himself to working as an IT technician for ticketing giant Ticketmaster.

== Discography ==
=== Singles ===
- "Get Hyper" (2011)
- "Ghetto Funk" (2012)
- "Human Error" (2013)
