= Rachel K Collier =

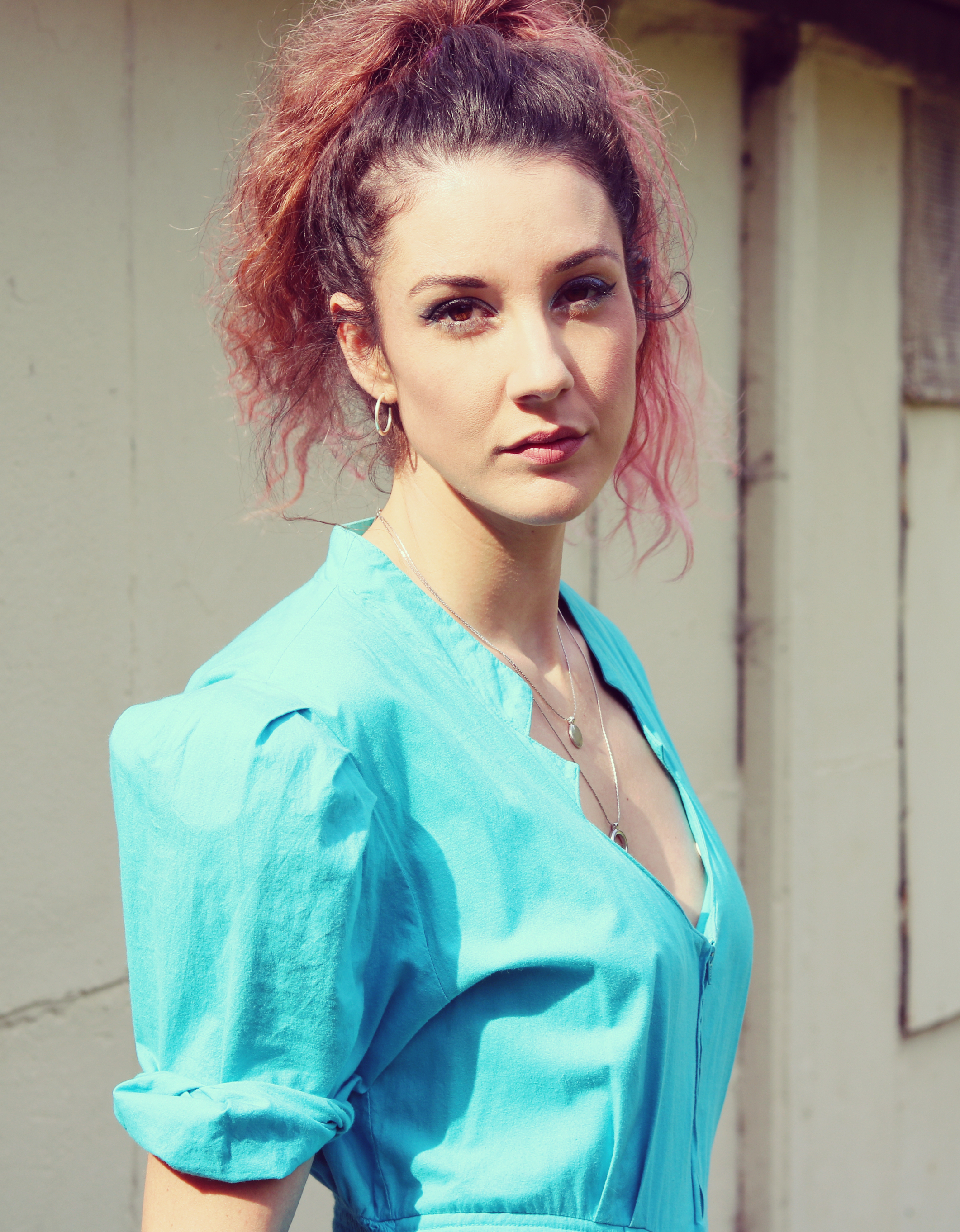

Background information
- Born: Rachel K Collier; Mumbles, Swansea, Wales
- Genres: House, electro house, drum and bass, deep house, pop, jazz
- Occupations: Singer, songwriter, producer
- Years active: 2012–present
- Labels: Strictly Rhythm, Hospital Records, Anjunabeats

Rachel K Collier is a Welsh electronic music producer and performer from Swansea, Wales. She studied Creative Music Technology (BMus) for four years at the Royal Welsh College of Music & Drama before moving to London to further pursue her music career.

== Career ==
In 2012, Collier recorded "Hard Road to Travel", a song originally recorded by Jimmy Cliff in 1967. The song was then released commercially by Saatchi & Saatchi, peaking at 79 on the UK Singles Chart after being featured in a QualitySolicitors advert. This was followed up in July 2012 with the release of the collaboration with Wookie on the single "2 Us".

In August 2013, Coller featured on Ray Foxx's single "Boom Boom (Heartbeat)". The song peaked at number 12 on the UK Singles Chart, number 2 on the UK Dance Chart and number 13 on the Scottish Singles Chart. "Boom Boom (Heartbeat)" was also nominated for "Best Collaboration" at the Urban Music Awards 2013.

November 2013 saw another collaboration, this time with Mat Zo on the track "Only For You", the second track on the album "Damage Control" with Collier credited as a co-writer and featured vocalist. The song was featured in the soundtrack of the 2014 racing video game Forza Horizon 2 and plays on the in-game radio station "Horizon Bass Arena".

Collier's solo debut single "Predictions", Sarah Jane Crawford's 'Smash' of the week on BBC Radio 1Xtra in November 2013, was released on 13 January 2014 on Strictly Rhythm.

== Discography ==
=== Singles ===
==== As lead artist ====
Year	Title	Peak chart positions
Year	Title	UK
2012	"Hard Road to Travel"	79
2014	"Predictions"	—
2016	"Ships"	—
2017	"Paper Tiger"	—
2017	"Rust"	—
2018	"Darkshade"	—
2018	"Poison"	—
2019	"Dinosaur"	—
2020	"Pila Pala Paradise"	—

==== As featured artist ====
Year	Title	Peak chart positions			Album
Year	Title	UK Singles	UK Dance Singles	SCO Singles Chart	Album
2012	"Why Does Anyone Ever Do Anything?" (Lung featuring Rachel K Collier)	—	—	—	Non-album singles
2012	"2 Us" (Wookie featuring Rachel K Collier)	—	—	—	Non-album singles
2013	"Boom Boom (Heartbeat)" (Ray Foxx featuring Rachel K Collier)	12	2	13	Non-album singles
2013	"Only for You" (Mat Zo featuring Rachel K Collier)	—	—	—	"Damage Control"
"—" denotes single that did not chart or was not released in that territory.

== Awards ==
- Urban Music Awards nomination for Best Collaboration, together with Ray Foxx
