= Joys (song) =

Single by Roberto Surace
- Released: 12 July 2019
- Recorded: 2019
- Length: 6:40
- Label: Defected
- Songwriter(s): Roberto Surace; Jimmy Jam & Terry Lewis
- Producer(s): Roberto Surace; Jimmy Jam & Terry Lewis

"Joys" is a song produced and recorded by Italian electronic/house DJ/remixer Roberto Surace, which samples The S.O.S. Band's 1986 single "The Finest". The song became Surace's first number one on both Billboard's Dance Club Songs chart and joint ventured Shazam Ibiza dance charts (in its 12 October and 30 September 2019 issues, respectively), and in Australia on the ARIA Club Chart (in its 30 September 2019 issue).

== Track listing ==
Extended mix

1. "Joys" (Extended Mix) – 6:40

Todd Terry mix

1. "Joys" (Todd Terry Mix) – 2:15

Purple Disco Machine mix

1. "Joys" (Purple Disco Mix) – 2:58

== Charts ==
=== Weekly charts ===
Chart (2019)	Peak position
Australia Club Tracks (ARIA)	1
Belgium (Ultratip Bubbling Under Flanders)	4
Scotland (OCC)	68
UK Singles (OCC)	90
US Dance Club Songs (Billboard)	1
US Hot Dance/Electronic Songs (Billboard)	17

=== Year-end charts ===
Chart (2019)	Position
US Dance Club Songs (Billboard)	11

== See also ==
- List of Billboard number-one dance songs of 2019
