= Yeo Valley Rap =

Single by Yeo Valley Boyz featuring Mr George & Lisa Roxanne
- Released: October 27, 2010
- Recorded: 2010
- Genre: Rap, advertising campaign
- Length: 1:59
- Label: Black Sheep Music
- Songwriter: Mr George
- Producer: Boi-1da

Yeo Valley singles chronology
"Yeo Valley Rap" (2010)	"Forever" (2011)

"Yeo Valley Rap" is an advertising campaign for the family-owned farming and dairy company, Yeo Valley Organic by the "Yeo Valley Boyz", which features Mr George and Lisa Roxanne. The advert was produced by Boi-1da and the lyrics were written by Mr George. After much positive feedback came for the advert, the rap was added to iTunes for digital download from October 27, 2010 on Black Sheep Music.

== Background ==
Originally, the rap was just an advertising campaign for Yeo Valley Organic. The advert then started coming during breaks for The X Factor. The advert gained popularity and after many requests, the advert was then available to download from iTunes. Rosie Arnold, the BBH Deputy Executive Creative Director, talked about the idea of the campaign: "What we wanted to do was make Yeo Valley Organic popular for everybody. We wanted to make people pronounce Yeo Valley correctly and get everybody talking about it. So that's how we came up with the rap idea." The farmers had to study rap and get into the styles of Jay-Z and Kanye West. The actors were also asked to take inspiration from Beyoncé, Lil' Kim and Lil' Wayne by the Lutz on set.

== Music video ==
The music video of the advert was uploaded onto YouTube on October 8, 2010. It was directed by Julien Lutz in Yeo Valley. The farmers are shown rapping inside the barns, out in the grass with the cows, in tractors and eating Yeo Valley Organic yogurt. The video currently has over 2.6 million views.

== Chart performance ==
"Yeo Valley Rap" charted in the UK Singles Chart on November 7, 2010 at number 71. The song also charted at number 9 on the UK Indie Chart and number 17 on the UK R&B Chart. The next week on November 13, 2010 it dropped 23 places to 94. The following week on November 21, it climbed 9 places to number 5. It then dropped 15 places on November 28, 2010. As of December 5, 2010 it is at number 80, where it climbed 20 places. There are currently many Facebook campaigns to get the track the Christmas number 1.

Chart (2010)	Peak Position
UK Indie (OCC)	6
UK Hip Hop/R&B (OCC)	17
UK Singles (OCC)	71
