= Dance on My Own (M.O song) =

Single by M.O
- Released: 22 August 2014
- Recorded: 2014
- Genre: UK garage
- Length: 3:08
- Label: Operator
- Songwriters: Annie Ashcroft; Francesca Connolly; Nadine Samuels; Darren Martyn; Martin Leslie Green; Michael Powell
- Producers: Darren Martyn; White N3rd; Loadstar

M.O singles chronology
"For a Minute" (2014)	"Dance on My Own" (2014)	"Preach" (2015)

"Dance on My Own" is a song by the English girl group M.O. It was released as a digital download on 22 August 2014 in the United Kingdom as the band's fifth single. Sampling the 2000s garage hit single "Flowers" by the female duo Sweet Female Attitude, the song was co-written with Darren Martyn, who also produced the track with White N3rd and the Loadstar duo.

== Music video ==
A music video for "Dance on My Own" was directed by Carly Cussen and filmed on a multi-story car park in Peckham, a district of south-east London. It was premiered on VEVO on 23 June 2014.

== Track listing ==
Digital download
No.	Title	Length
1.	"Dance on My Own"	3:08

== Chart performance ==
Chart (2014)	Peak position
UK Singles (Official Charts)	49

== Release history ==
Region	Date	Format	Label
United Kingdom	22 August 2014	Digital download	Operator
