= Preach (M.O song) =

Single by M.O
- Released: 24 April 2015
- Recorded: 2015
- Genre: Pop; R&B
- Length: 3:18
- Label: Operator
- Songwriters: Annie Ashcroft; Francesca Connolly; Fred Gibson; Joel Compass; Ed Thomas; Finlay Dow-Smith
- Producer: Starsmith

M.O singles chronology
"Dance On My Own" (2014)	"Preach" (2015)	"Who Do You Think Of?" (2016)

"Preach" is a song by English girl group M.O. Co-written by Joel Compass and Starsmith, it was released as a digital download on 24 April 2015 in the United Kingdom, marking the band's third regular single. It reached number 51 on the UK Singles Chart.

== Music video ==
A music video for "Preach" was directed by Kate Moross and released online on 27 March 2015.

== Track listing ==
Digital download
No.	Title	Length
1.	"Preach"	3:18

Remix single
No.	Title	Length
1.	"Preach" (Applebottom Remix)	3:22
2.	"Preach" (Tazer Remix)	3:56
3.	"Preach" (Cahill Remix)	3:29

== Charts ==
Chart (2015)	Peak position
UK Singles (Official Charts)	51

== Release history ==
Region	Date	Format	Label
United Kingdom	24 April 2015	Promo single	Operator
United Kingdom	1 May 2015	Remix single	Operator
