= For a Minute =

Single by M.O
- Released: 13 April 2014
- Genre: Pop; R&B
- Length: 2:56
- Label: Operator
- Songwriter: Jess Glynne
- Producers: Bless Beats; Loadstar

M.O singles chronology
"For a Minute" (2014)	"Dance On My Own" (2014)

"For a Minute" is a song by English girl group M.O. It was co-written by Jess Glynne and produced by Bless Beats and Loadstar. The song was released by Operator Records as a digital download on 13 April 2014 in the United Kingdom, marking the trio's debut single after buzz tracks "On Ya", "Hot", "Wait Your Turn", "Come Let Me Show You", and "Ain't Got Time".

== Music video ==
A music video for "For a Minute" premiered on the band's YouTube channel on 27 February 2014.

== Track listing ==
Digital download
No.	Title	Length
1.	"For a Minute"	2:56

== Chart performance ==
Chart (2014)	Peak position
UK Singles (Official Charts)	103
UK Indie (Official Charts)	6

== Release history ==
Region	Date	Format	Label
United Kingdom	13 April 2014	Digital download	Operator
