= S.mouse =

- Angry Boys character
- First appearance: Episode 2
- Last appearance: Episode 12
- Created by: Chris Lilley
- Portrayed by: Chris Lilley

In-universe information
- Full name: Shawyne Booth Jr.
- Species: Human
- Gender: Male
- Occupation: Rapper
- Family: Shwayne Booth Snr. (father); Clarise Booth (mother)
- Significant other: Lasquisha (ex-girlfriend)
- Nationality: American

Shwayne Booth Jr., known as S.mouse (later as S.mouse!), is a fictional character from the Australian mockumentary television series Angry Boys. He was frequently spotted at 8 Park Lane. The character is an African American rapper who lives in Calabasas, California, and is portrayed by Chris Lilley, who wears a curly wig and blackface. He has appeared in Angry Boys since the second episode, when he is introduced as the rapper who just released the biggest selling hip-hop single of all time, "Slap My Elbow". Later in the show, S.mouse is put under house arrest at his parents' home for two months, after defecating on a police car in the music video for his single "Poo on You". He also gets dropped from his record label after another one of his videos, "Grandmother Fucker", receives many complaints.

S.mouse has received a mixed response from critics. Paul Kalina of The Sydney Morning Herald has written that "S.mouse is arguably the new show's weakest incarnation", while Rowen Dean of ABC Online describes him as "Eminem meets Ali G meets Snoop Dogg".

== Storylines ==
S.mouse is introduced as the rapper who just released the biggest selling hip-hop single of all time, "Slap My Elbow". S.mouse tries to reinvent himself. He defies his record label contract and releases his self-penned YouTube released "Poo on You", in which the music video sees S.mouse defecating on a police car. He later makes an online apology to his fans and is put under house arrest at his parents' home for two months. S.mouse receives a demo from his manager Larry and he expresses great dislike of the track. He then decides to release a new single called "Grandmother Fucker". The music video for the song features an appearance by S.mouse's grandmother, which angers his father Shwayne Senior (Richard Lawson). S.mouse later receives a phone call from his manager that he has been dropped from his record label due to the video receiving so many complaints.

S.mouse decides to create his own music for his new album, The Real Me. The album will be released independently and is executively produced by his best friend Danthony (Clyde Boraine). S.mouse had originally planned to feature Barbadian singer Rihanna on his new song, "Big Black Balls", however it features his girlfriend Lasquisha (Kristin Dione Metoyer) instead. S.mouse completes his community service by performing his new songs to an unimpressed audience of children at an elementary school. Lasquisha tells him that they don't know him and he'll already be forgotten once his house arrest is over. S.mouse goes to the mall, even though he is not allowed to leave the house, to prove that he is still famous. However, no one cares that he is there and when Lasquisha asks people if they know him, they say no. When they arrive home, a parole officer tightens the security on S.mouse's ankle monitor. If he walks out the gate, he will be electrocuted. S.mouse spends the afternoon writing a new song called "Whack My Knee" and Lasquisha comes up with a dance craze for the song. During a photo shoot for his new album, The Real Me, a paparazzi helicopter secretly takes photos of S.mouse shirtless and puts them online, claiming that he has become fat. S.mouse later finds out that Lasquisha has dumped him, as she does not want to be associated with someone believed to be fat. S.mouse launches his new album at a club in Los Angeles to a crowd who are less than pleased. He writes a new song called "Squashed Nigga", based on Daniel's story about an Aborigine child named Wally who was crushed by a truck. S.mouse decides to sing the song instead of rapping the lyrics. He subsequently re-invents himself under the performing name of: Shwayne Jr.

== Development ==
S.mouse is portrayed by comedian Chris Lilley. In an interview with Ralph magazine, Lilley revealed it was difficult and tricky to play S.mouse due to the hip-hop music, working with American actors and pretending to be a black person in an American family. Discussing his character in an interview with The Vine, Lilley said,

"The world of S.mouse is not my world – I don't know people like that. I know about the world of hip-hop because I'm interested in that kind of music but I wanted to show that world in a different way, not just present all the usual clichés. I wanted it to be a genuine story about a genuine guy. But being in that make-up, speaking that way and interacting with the black actors who played my family... it was very far-removed from anything I'm used to."

== Reception ==
The character received mixed reviews from critics. After S.mouse's first appearance on Angry Boys, Larissa Dubecki of The Age expressed the opinion that he contained some of Jonah Takalua's DNA, but also "found him plain annoying although his impending house arrest might pique interest." Paul Kalina of The Sydney Morning Herald wrote that "S.mouse is arguably the new show's weakest incarnation, being someone we've already seen in sketch shows and whose cultural baggage doesn't register as sharply as Lilley's local characters do." Rowen Dean of ABC Online described the character as "Eminem meets Ali G meets Snoop Dog". Eleanor Morgan of The Guardian compared S.mouse to the Jamaican woman in David Walliams' series Come Fly with Me, stating he "isn't offensive in the way David Walliams... makes his character's ethnicity the punchline, whereas Lilley has created a ridiculous character who just happens to be black." Ruth Margolis of TV.com wrote, "... it's not clear whether his accent is intentionally awful or whether he just hasn't mastered it in time for filming. Whatever the case, S.mouse doesn't quite work. He's not layered like Lilley's other creations".

In 2011, the Sydney Morning Herald asked several hip-hop stars if the character was offensive. Open Mike Eagle responded, "Hell yeah it's offensive. Blackface is not the kind of thing that just becomes acceptable one day. I don't give a damn how 'meta' this cat thinks he is, it doesn't give him a pass to exploit the history of race relations for a cheap laugh."

=== Commercial performances ===
Three of S.mouse's songs, "Animal Zoo", "Slap My Elbow" and "Squashed Nigga", have been released as singles, available for digital download on the Australian iTunes Store. "Slap My Elbow" entered the ARIA Singles Chart and the ARIA Urban Singles Chart; it peaked at numbers thirty-seven and thirteen, respectively. In the United Kingdom, "Slap My Elbow" debuted at number 139 on the UK Singles Chart on August 13, 2011, and "Squashed Nigga" debuted at number 151 on August 20, 2011.
