= SL (rapper) =

British rapper

- Also known as: S
- Born: Harlee Bashir Laguda Milne; 3 September 2001 (age 25); Peckham, Greater London, England
- Origin: Thornton Heath, Greater London, England
- Genres: British hip hop; trap; UK drill
- Occupation: Rapper
- Years active: 2017–present
- Labels: Virgin EMI; Mic Cheque

Harlee Bashir Laguda Milne (born 3 September 2001), known professionally as SL, is a masked British rapper from Thornton Heath, South London, known for his laid-back hypnotic flow, atmospheric production, and influences from UK drill, trap, and hip-hop. His lyrics often explore street life, ambition, and personal experiences.

== Early life ==
Harlee Bashir Laguda Milne was born on 3 September 2001 in Peckham, London, England to Nigerian parents. He was later raised in Thornton Heath, London during his childhood.

== Career ==
SL's first single "Gentleman", released in 2017 when he was 15 years old, has been described as a "street anthem", amassing 90 million views on YouTube, as of September 2026. His next single, "Tropical", peaked on the UK Singles Chart at number 73 in February 2018 and was later certified Platinum by the BPI in 2022. In May, his track "Genes" featuring Chip peaked at number 90. That same month, he was featured on Nines' track "Oh My", which peaked at number 44. "Oh My" would later be certified Gold in 2023 by the British Phonographic Industry (BPI).

On 15 May 2020, he released a single from his collaboration extended play with American record producer Kenny Beats, titled "Bad Luck", along with its music video. They later released the EP, titled Selhurst SE25 on 4 July 2020, along with a music video for the song "Little Bird" from the project. On 23 October 2020, he released his debut studio album, titled Different Dude.

== Musical style and artistry ==
SL is known for his slower "laid back" style of rapping, which has been compared to Giggs. He actively wears a ski mask in public, to make his identity anonymous in addition to his persona.

== Discography ==
=== Extended plays ===
Title	Album details
Selhurst SE25 (with Kenny Beats)	Released: 4 July 2020; Label: Virgin EMI, Mic Cheque; Format: Digital download
