= Yeo Valley (company) =

British farming and dairy company

Yeo Valley Organic
- Type: Private
- Industry: Dairy
- Founded: 1994 (Yeo Valley)
- Founders: Roger and Mary Mead
- Headquarters: Blagdon, Somerset, United Kingdom
- Area served: United Kingdom
- Key people: Roger and Mary Mead (Founders); Tim Mead (owner)
- Products: Yoghurt; Milk; Butter; Cream; Cheese; Ice Cream
- Brands: Yeo Valley Organic; Yeo Valley Cafe; Yeo Valley Organic Gardens & Cafe
- Owner: Mead family
- Website: www.yeovalley.co.uk

Yeo Valley (/joʊ/ YOH) is a British dairy company that was founded in 1994. The headquarters are in Somerset, United Kingdom. The Yeo Valley corporation is owned by the Mead family. In 2020, Yeo Valley Organic was the 48th biggest grocery brand in the United Kingdom (according to The Grocer) and the third largest yoghurt brand in the UK.

== History ==
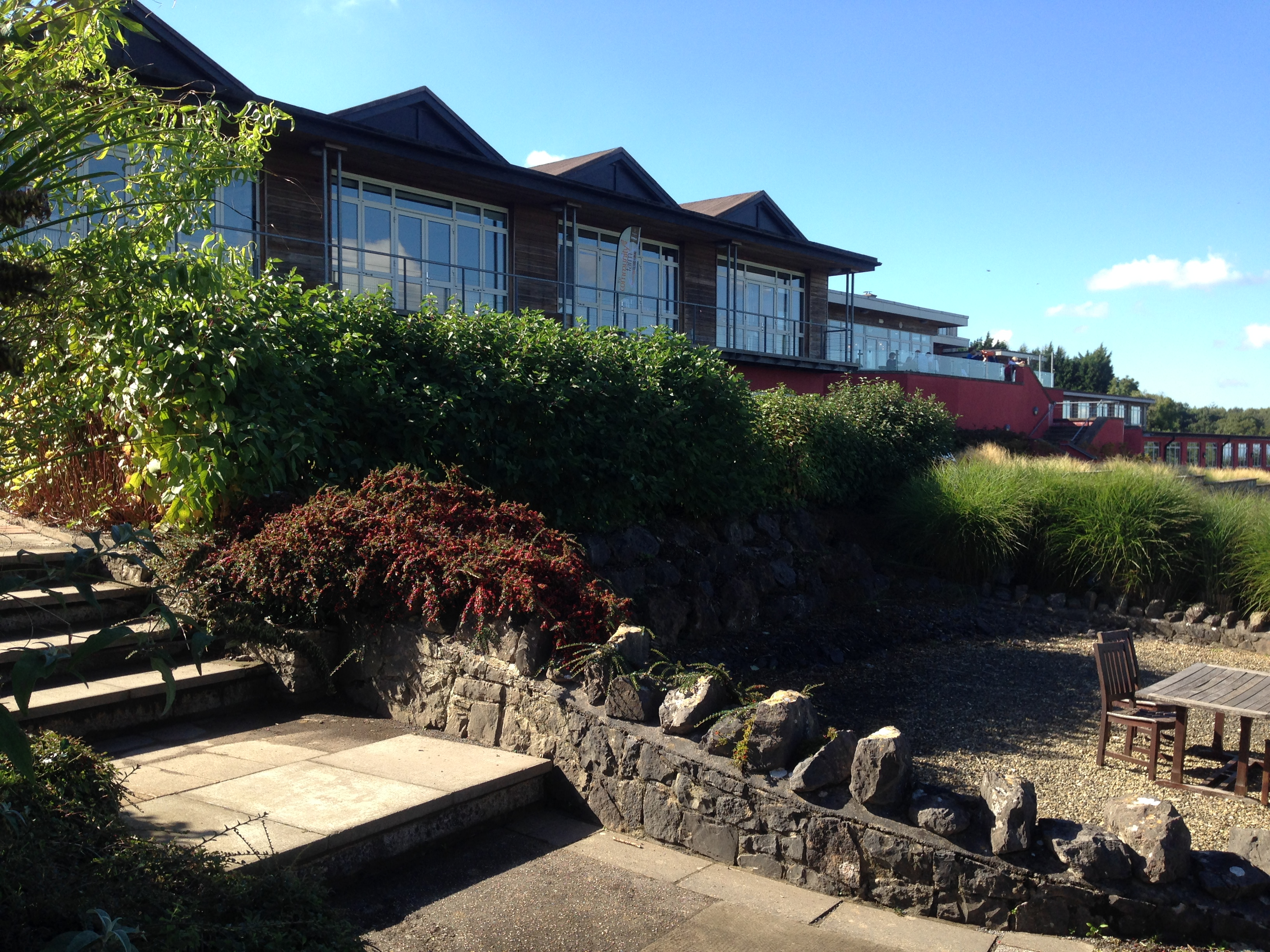
Yeo Valley headquarters in Blagdon

Yeo Valley founders Roger and Mary Mead purchased Holt Farm, Blagdon in 1961 and began making yoghurt using milk from their dairy farming herd in 1972, selling it from their farm and to local shops. Production of organic yoghurt was started in 1993, due to a surplus of local organic milk.

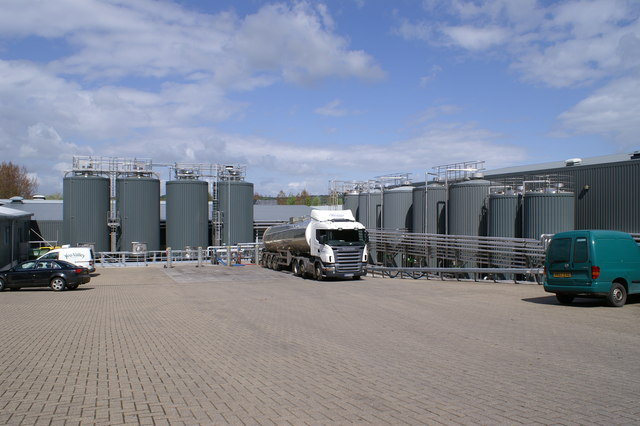
Yeo Valley production facility at Lag Farm in Blagdon

The present owner is the founders' son, Tim Mead, who took over in 1990, when Roger Mead died.

In March 2012, the business was re-branded as "Yeo Valley Family Farm" by Perry Haydn Taylor's agency Big Fish.

In 2018, the subsidiary Yeo Valley Dairies Ltd was purchased by Arla Foods UK, transferring the licence to produce milk, butter, spreads, and cheese under the Yeo Valley Organic brand to Arla. Production of Yeo Valley Organic yoghurt, ice cream, cream and desserts remained with Yeo Valley Production. Yeo Valley Production employs over 1,600 staff across sites in the West Country.

Yeo Valley Group installed one acre of solar panels on the roof of its Holt Farm Dairy in Blagdon, Somerset. The company has installed solar panels across its other manufacturing sites including Crewkerne and 3,300 solar panels at its site in Highbridge.

== Recognition ==
The brand won a Queen's Award for Enterprise in 2001, for its work with its farming suppliers and one in 2006 for its "Approach to management with continuing support for sustainable UK organic farming thereby minimizing environmental impact.".

Co-founder Mary Mead was awarded an Order of the British Empire for services to sustainable dairy farming in the 2012 New Year's Honours List. In 2015, Mary Mead was presented with the Royal Association of British Dairy Farmers’ Princess Royal Award for services to the UK dairy industry. She was also awarded an Honorary Master of Arts Degree from the University of Bristol and a BBC Radio 4 Food and Farming Awards Farmer of the Year.

Yeo Valley Organic was voted the UK's ‘favourite organic brand’ by Good Housekeeping readers in 2021.

== Sources ==
- Nielson, Tina (March 2009). "Profile: Tim Mead". Director Magazine. London: Institute of Directors. Archived from the original on 11 October 2011.
