= Florrie discography =

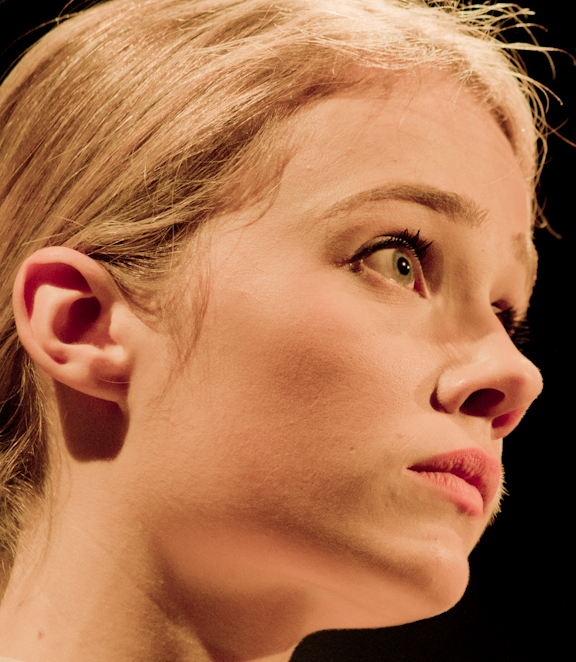
- Florrie live in Paris (2011)
- Studio albums: 2
- EPs: 4
- Compilation albums: 1
- Singles: 29
- Music videos: 26

English singer and songwriter Florrie has released two studio albums, a compilation album, four extended plays (EPs), twenty-nine singles and twenty-six music videos.

Florrie released her debut EP, Introduction, in November 2010 through iTunes Store, containing the tracks "Call of the Wild", "Give Me Your Love", "Summer Nights" and "Left Too Late". The EP was made available for free download on her official website, as well as on 12" vinyl pressings limited to 500 copies. Her second EP, Experiments, was released in June 2011 and included the singles "I Took a Little Something" and "Begging Me". The lead single "Begging Me" was released in April 2011. The music video for the second single, "I Took a Little Something", was a collaboration with fashion house Dolce & Gabbana.

Her third extended play, Late, was released in May 2012. That same month, she announced on her website that she would be signing with a major record label, making Late her final release as an independent artist. The label was later revealed to be Sony Music.

Florrie released her fourth extended play, Sirens, in April 2014, accompanied by music videos for three of its tracks. Between 2014 and 2016, she released three more singles under her contract with Sony Music: "Little White Lies" on 15 August 2014, "Too Young to Remember" on 6 March 2015, and "Real Love" on February 5, 2016. All three tracks were originally intended for inclusion on her planned debut studio album. Following the release of "Real Love", Florrie and Sony Music ended their professional relationship and the album was shelved.

After a three-year hiatus, Florrie made her return to music on 2 May 2019, with the release of the single "Borderline"; the track was later included on her first compilation album, Personal, released on 8 December 2023. The album features twelve previously released singles spanning the period from 2019 to 2023.

Florrie's debut studio album, The Lost Ones, was released on 14 June 2024. She revealed the album's cover art and tracklist on 22 March, alongside the release of the title track as the lead single and the opening of pre-orders. The album spawned four singles: "The Lost Ones", "Kissing in the Cold", "Never Far from Paradise" and "Looking for Love".

In the same year, Florrie released the stand-alone single "Swimming Pool", alongside its music video on 30 August. A second stand-alone single, "Pieces", was released in February 2025.

== Albums ==
=== Studio albums ===
List of studio albums, with selected chart positions
Title	Details	Peak chart positions		
Title	Details	UK DL	UK Indie	UK Indie Breakers
The Lost Ones	Released: 14 June 2024; Formats: CD, digital download, LP, streaming; Label: Xenomania, BMG	36	36	9
Magic for a While	Released: 16 October 2026; Formats: CD, digital download, LP, streaming; Label: Xenomania, BMG	44	49	5

=== Compilation albums ===
Title	Album detailes
Personal	Released: 8 December 2023; Format: Digital download, streaming; Label: Xenomania

== Extended plays ==
=== Introduction ===
Introduction

EP by Florrie
- Released: 15 November 2010
- Recorded: England
- Genres: Pop; synthpop
- Length: 15:23
- Label: Self-released
- Producer: Xenomania

Introduction is the first EP by Florrie. It was released on 15 November 2010 as free download on her official site. It's available also on iTunes. The EP consists of four songs produced by Xenomania. It was preceded by the release of Florrie's debut single "Call 911", back in 2010, as a remix by Fred Falke. Other songs that preceded the release of the extended play were "Panic Attack", "Fascinate Me", "Come Back to Mine", all of them released as remixes, like the case of "Call 911", which original version is still unreleased.

Florrie released a music video for the song "Give Me Your Love". The video consists of Florrie and a backing band performing the song. The audio track of the video is the studio version of the song.

Track listing
No.	Title	Writer(s)	Producer(s)	Length
1.	"Call of the Wild"	Florrie Arnold; Eliza Dodd-Noble; Hannah Caughlin; Dorothy Allison; Samuel Martin; Jason Resch; Kieran Jones; Brian Higgins; Toby Scott	Xenomania	3:19
2.	"Give Me Your Love"	Arnold; Miranda Cooper; Resch; Jones; B. Higgins; Scott; Fred Falke	Xenomania	3:53
3.	"Summer Nights"	Arnold; Dodd-Noble; Cooper; Resch; Jones; Andrew Higgins; B. Higgins; Timothy Larcombe; Scott	Xenomania	3:54
4.	"Left Too Late"	Arnold; Dodd-Noble; Cooper; B. Higgins; Scott; Falke	Xenomania	4:17

=== Experiments ===
Experiments

EP by Florrie
- Released: 14 June 2011
- Recorded: England
- Genres: Pop; pop rock; synthpop
- Length: 26:49
- Label: Self-released
- Producer: Xenomania

Florrie chronology
Introduction (2010)	Experiments (2011)	Late (2012)

Singles from Experiments
- 1. "Begging Me" Released: 28 April 2011; 2. "I Took a Little Something" Released: 11 July 2011

Professional ratings
Review scores
Source	Rating
About.com	5/5 stars
The Guardian	(positive)

Experiments is the second EP by Florrie. It was released on 14 June 2011 as download on iTunes. The EP consists of six songs produced by Xenomania.

There were made music videos for the songs "Begging Me", "I Took a Little Something" and "Experimenting with Rugs".

In a review of the EP, The Guardian wrote, "Thankfully, Florrie has the songs to make this way of working pay, having collaborated with Xenomania, MNEK, Fred Falke and Mike Chapman of Parallel Lines to create some sparkling pop moments".

Track listing
No.	Title	Writer(s)	Producer(s)	Length
1.	"Speed of Light"	Florrie Arnold; Miranda Cooper; Uzoechi Emenike; Jason Resch; Kieran Jones; Brian Higgins; Toby Scott; Timothy "Hight" Deal; Fred Falke; Mike Chapman	Xenomania	4:38
2.	"Experimenting with Rugs"	Arnold; Samuel Martin; Cooper; Emenike; Owen Parker; Resch; Jones; Higgins; Scott; Deal	Xenomania	5:31
3.	"What You Doing This For?"	Arnold; Cooper; Yannick Grandjean; Thomas Roussel; Parker; Resch; Jones; Higgins; Scott	Xenomania	4:40
4.	"I Took a Little Something"	Arnold; Cooper; Emenike; Higgins; Scott; Falke; Keith Reid; Christopher Thompson	Xenomania	4:11
5.	"Begging Me"	Arnold; Eliza Dodd Noble; Cooper; Parker; Higgins; Matthew Gray; Scott; Falke	Xenomania	4:04
6.	"She Always Gets What She Wants"	Arnold; Cooper; Resch; Jones; Higgins; Scott	Xenomania	3:45

=== Late ===
Late

EP by Florrie
- Released: 31 May 2012
- Recorded: England
- Genres: Pop; synthpop; dance; electronic
- Length: 16:31
- Label: Self-released
- Producer: Xenomania

Late is the third EP by Florrie. It was released as download on iTunes on 31 May 2012. The EP consists of four songs produced by Xenomania.

Florrie released a music video for the song "Shot You Down".

Notable Dance magazine reviewed this EP and mentioned that "at only 4 songs, 100% of the content of the Late EP is fantastic, but after 16 minutes, it's over. So while the Late EP is extremely notable, the length is disappointing, especially following Experiments, a 6-track EP".

Track listing
No.	Title	Writer(s)	Producer(s)	Length
1.	"Shot You Down"	Florrie Arnold; Miranda Cooper; Uzoechi Emenike; Jerry Bouthier; Owen Parker; Brian Higgins; Toby Scott	Xenomania	3:43
2.	"I'm Gonna Get You Back"	Arnold; Samuel Martin; Jason Resch; Kieran Jones; Higgins; Scott; Timothy "Hight" Deal; Luke Fitton	Xenomania	4:17
3.	"Every Inch"	Arnold; Niara Scarlett; Cooper; Martin; Emenike; Higgins; Scott; Deal; Falke	Xenomania	4:31
4.	"To the End"	Arnold; Annie Strand; Higgins; Scott; Deal; Fitton	Xenomania	4:00

=== Sirens ===
Sirens

EP by Florrie
- Released: 27 April 2014
- Recorded: England
- Genres: Pop; synthpop
- Label: Sony
- Producer: Xenomania

Sirens is the fourth EP by Florrie, released by Sony Music on iTunes on 27 April 2014. The EP consists of 3 new songs and 2 remixes, one being a song included on the EP and the other an unreleased song ("Little White Lies") which would later be released as the first single from Florrie's debut album.

Music videos accompanying each of the three new songs were released through Florrie's YouTube account leading up to the digital release of the EP. Two videos, "Free Falling" and "Wanna Control Myself" (which featured British model Calum Ball), were directed by Jack Bowden, and the other one, "Seashells", by Ferry Gouw.

The EP shows somewhat of a departure from Florrie's previously pop and dance oriented music, featuring more loosely structured songs and widely incorporating spoken word lyrics. According to Florrie, a purpose of the EP's release was to generate buzz before the release of her debut album later in the year.

Track listing
No.	Title	Writer(s)	Producer(s)	Length
1.	"Seashells"	Florrie Arnold; Jennifer Milne-Skillman; Dion Howell; Daniel Shah; Brian Higgins; Toby Scott; Timothy "Hight" Deal	Xenomania	2:52
2.	"Free Falling"	Arnold; Miranda Cooper; Higgins; Jonathan Shave; Scott; Paul Woods	Xenomania	2:39
3.	"Wanna Control Myself"	Arnold; Cooper; Higgins; Shave; Scott; Woods	Xenomania	3:32
4.	"Little White Lies" (Shadow Child Dub Remix)	Arnold; Annie Yuill; Roman Rappak; Higgins; Scott	Xenomania; Shadow Child	4:55
5.	"Seashells" (Preditah Remix)	Arnold; Milne-Skillman; Howell; Shah; Higgins; Scott; Deal	Xenomania; Preditah	3:01

== Singles ==
Title	Year	Album
"Call 911"	2010	Non-album singles
"Sunday Girl"	2010	Non-album singles
"Begging Me"	2011	Experiments
"I Took a Little Something"	2011	Experiments
"Shot You Down"	2012	Late
"Live a Little"	2013	Non-album singles
"Panic Attack" (Adrian Michaels remix)	2013	Non-album singles
"Little White Lies"	2014	Non-album singles
"Too Young to Remember"	2015	Non-album singles
"Real Love"	2016	Non-album singles
"Borderline"	2019	Personal
"Unstable"	2019	Personal
"Hell or High Water"	2020	Personal
"Butterflies"	2020	Non-album single
"Garden"	2021	Personal
"Hours"	2021	Personal
"Walk Away"	2021	Personal
"Street Lights"	2021	Personal
"Human"	2021	Personal
"Communicate"	2021	Personal
"What If I'm Wrong"	2022	Personal
"Falling Back to You"	2022	Personal
"Personal"	2023	Personal and The Lost Ones
"The Lost Ones"	2024	The Lost Ones
"Kissing in the Cold"	2024	The Lost Ones
"Never Far from Paradise"	2024	The Lost Ones
"Looking for Love"	2024	The Lost Ones
"Swimming Pool"	2024	Non-album single
"Pieces"	2025	Non-album single
"The Times"	2026	Magic for a While
"Malibu (Falling Over the Edge)"	2026	Magic for a While
"Warrior"	2026	Magic for a While
"Catch You If You Fall"	2026	Magic for a While
"Magic for a While"	2026	Magic for a While

== Music videos ==
Title	Year	Director	Ref.
"Give Me Your Love"	2010	—N/a	
"Sunday Girl" (Nina L'Elixir advert)	2010	Nez	
"Begging Me"	2011	Price James	
"Experimenting with Rugs"	2011	Lee Jenkins	
"I Took a Little Something"	2011	Justin Wu	
"Make Your Own Rhythm"	2012	Christian Larson	
"Shot You Down"	2012	Tom Gallon	
"Live a Little"	2013	Elisha Smith-Leverock	
"Seashells"	2014	Ferry Gouw	
"Free Falling"	2014	Jack A. Bowden	
"Wanna Control Myself"	2014	Jack A. Bowden	
"Little White Lies"	2014	Zaiba Jabbar	
"Too Young to Remember"	2015	Mathy & Fran	
"Real Love"	2016	Emil Nava	
"Borderline"	2019	Matt Markwalder	
"Communicate"	2021	Archie Campbell	
"The Lost Ones"	2024	Archie Campbell & Stephen Campbell	
"Kissing in the Cold"	2024	Archie Campbell	
"Never Far from Paradise"	2024	Archie Campbell	
"Looking for Love"	2024	Florrie Arnold	
"Swimming Pool"	2024	Archie Campbell & Florrie Arnold	
"Jealous"	2024	Archie Campbell & Florrie Arnold	
"Honeymoon's Over"	2024	Archie Campbell & Florrie Arnold	
"If It's Been a Hard Night"	2024	Archie Campbell & Florrie Arnold	
"Personal"	2025	Archie Campbell & Florrie Arnold	
"Pieces"	2025	Archie Campbell & Florrie Arnold	

== Other appearances ==
=== With Capulets ===
Extended Play(s)
Title	Details	Tracklist
Act I	Released: June 21, 2019; Label: Xenomania; Format: Digital	1. "Annie"; 2. "Xo"; 3. "Community Centre"
Act II	Released: November 29, 2019; Label: Xenomania; Format: Digital	1. "Stranger Love"; 2. "Pushing"; 3. "Sweet Enough"

Singles
Title	Year	Album
"Annie"	2019	Act I
"Stranger Love"	2019	Act II
"Pushing"	2019	Act II
"Co-star"	2020	Non album-singles
"You, Me & Her"	2020	Non album-singles
"Wait"	2020	Non album-singles
"Tribe"	2020	Non album-singles

Music Videos
Title	Year	Director	Ref.
"Annie"	2019	Unknown	
"Co-star"	2020	Unknown	
"Tribe"	2020	Unknown	

== Songwriting and production credits ==
List of songwriting and production credits for other artists by Florrie
Title	Year	Credits						Artist	Album	Ref.
Title	Year	Associated perfomer	Background vocals	Composer	Drums	Programmer	Other(s)	Artist	Album	Ref.
"The Boy Does Nothing"	2008	*	*	*	Yes	*	*	Alesha Dixon	The Alesha Show	
"Don't Ever Let Me Go"	2008	*	*	*	Yes	*	*	Alesha Dixon	The Alesha Show	
"There Goes My Heart"	2010	*	*	*	Yes	*	*	Alex Gardner	The Alex Gardner EP	
"I Wanna Be with Her"	2010	*	*	*	Yes	*	*	Alex Gardner	The Alex Gardner EP	
"Yesterday's News"	2010	*	*	*	Yes	*	*	Alex Gardner	The Alex Gardner EP	
"You See with Me"	2010	*	*	*	Yes	*	*	Alex Gardner	The Alex Gardner EP	
"My Usual Cure"	2025	*	*	Yes	Yes	*	*	Aurelia Bleach	Non-album single	
"Overboard"	2025	*	*	Yes	Yes	*	*	Aurelia Bleach	Non-album single	
"Grudge"	2025	*	*	Yes	Yes	*	*	Aurelia Bleach	Non-album single	
"The Time It Kills"	2026	*	*	Yes	Yes	*	*	Aurelia Bleach	Non-album single	
"Crazy"	2025	*	*	Yes	Yes	*	*	Aurelia Bleach	Non-album single	
"Pouring Rain"	2025	*	*	Yes	Yes	*	*	Aurelia Bleach	Non-album single	
"Eve & Paradise Lost (ARTE Live at Turner Contemporary)"	2025	*	*	*	Yes	*	*	Bastille	"&" (Ampersand, Part Four)	
"Leonard & Marianne (ARTE Live at Turner Contemporary)"	2025	*	*	*	Yes	*	*	Bastille	"&" (Ampersand, Part Four)	
"Good Grief (ARTE Live at Turner Contemporary)"	2025	*	*	*	Yes	*	*	Bastille	"&" (Ampersand, Part Four)	
"Zheng Yi Sao & Question for Her (ARTE Live at Turner Contemporary)"	2025	*	*	*	Yes	*	*	Bastille	"&" (Ampersand, Part Four)	
"Annie"	2019	*	*	Yes	*	*	*	Capulets	Act I	
"Community Centre"	2019	*	*	Yes	*	*	*	Capulets	Act I	
"XO"	2019	*	*	Yes	*	*	*	Capulets	Act I	
"Stranger Love"	2019	*	*	Yes	*	*	*	Capulets	Act II	
"Sweet Enough"	2019	*	*	Yes	*	*	*	Capulets	Act II	
"Pushing"	2019	*	*	Yes	*	*	*	Capulets	Act II	
"You, Me & Her"	2020	*	*	Yes	*	*	*	Capulets	Non-album single	
"Tribe"	2020	*	*	Yes	*	*	*	Capulets	Non-album single	
"Wait"	2020	*	*	Yes	*	*	*	Capulets	Non-album single	
"Co-star"	2020	*	*	Yes	*	*	*	Capulets	Non-album single	
"Somos"	2025	*	*	Yes	*	*	*	Crystal	Non-album single	
"Hotseat"	2022	*	*	Yes	*	*	*	CuteBad	Non-album single	
"Shotgun"	2018	*	Yes	*	*	*	*	George Ezra	Staying at Tamara's	
"Paradise"	2018	*	Yes	*	*	*	*	George Ezra	Staying at Tamara's	
"Don't Matter Now"	2018	*	*	*	*	*	Vocals	George Ezra	Staying at Tamara's	
"Sugarcoat"	2018	*	Yes	*	*	*	*	George Ezra	Staying at Tamara's	
"The Beautiful Dream"	2018	*	Yes	*	*	*	*	George Ezra	Staying at Tamara's	
"Something New"	2012	Yes	*	Yes	Yes	*	*	Girls Aloud	Ten	
"The Promise"	2008	*	*	*	Yes	*	*	Girls Aloud	Out of Control	
"Love Is The Key"	2008	*	*	*	Yes	*	*	Girls Aloud	Out of Control	
"We Wanna Party"	2008	*	*	*	Yes	*	*	Girls Aloud	Out of Control	
"Think You're So Cool"	2022	*	*	Yes	*	*	*	Holly and Vee	Non-album single	
"Make a Move"	2024	*	*	Yes	*	*	*	Holly and Vee	Non-album single	
"Purple Rain"	2016	*	*	*	Yes	Yes	*	Jolan	Parallel	
"Hold Me Like You Love Me"	2017	Yes	*	*	*	Yes	*	Jolan	Non-album single	
"Patient"	2017	*	*	Yes	*	*	Guitar	Jolan	Non-album single	
"Qualia"	2023	*	*	Yes	*	*	*	Kelocura; Flow	Non-album single	
"One Touch"	2010	*	*	Yes	*	*	*	Mini Viva	Non-album single	
"Hair Down"	2017	Yes	*	Yes	*	Yes	*	Mollie King	Non-album single	
"Go to Work"	2017	Yes	*	Yes	*	Yes	*	Nadine Coyle	Non-album single	
"Fool for Love"	2019	*	*	Yes	*	*	*	Nadine Coyle	Non-album single	
"September Song"	2018	Yes	*	*	*	*	*	Nadine Coyle	Nadine	
"Gossip"	2018	Yes	*	*	*	*	*	Nadine Coyle	Nadine	
"Honest"	2020	*	*	Yes	*	*	*	Paige Cavell	Non-album single	
"Mr Bright Eyes"	2011	*	*	*	Yes	*	*	Rebecca Ferguson	Heaven	
"Too Bad"	2009	*	*	Yes	*	*	*	Sarah Harding	St. Trinian's 2 Soundtrack	
"(Went Out) with a Bang"	2017	*	*	Yes	*	*	*	Senhit	Hey Buddy	
"Club Song"	2026	*	*	*	*	*	Vocal producer	The Pussycat Dolls	Non-album single	
"All Fired Up"	2011	*	*	*	*	Yes	Engineer	The Saturdays	On Your Radar	
"What Are You Waiting For?"	2020	*	*	Yes	*	*	*	The Saturdays	Finest Selection: The Greatest Hits	
"Looking for a Hug"	2019	*	*	Yes	*	*	*	unperfect	Non-album single	
"I'm a Dreamer"	2019	*	*	Yes	*	*	*	unperfect	Non-album single	
"Poppin' Off"	2019	*	*	Yes	*	*	*	unperfect	Non-album single	
"Champagne"	2019	*	*	Yes	*	*	*	unperfect	Go On.. It's a Vibe	
"Electric"	2019	*	*	Yes	*	*	*	unperfect	Go On.. It's a Vibe	
"IAFWU (Slide Out of My DMs)"	2019	*	*	Yes	*	*	*	unperfect	Go On.. It's a Vibe	
"Body on My Beat"	2019	*	*	Yes	*	*	*	unperfect	Go On.. It's a Vibe	
"Can't Get Over It, Pt. 1"	2021	*	*	Yes	*	*	*	unperfect	Can't Get Over It	
"Can't Get Over It, Pt. 2"	2021	*	*	Yes	*	*	*	unperfect	Can't Get Over It	
"Outta Sight"	2022	*	*	Yes	*	*	*	Xan Griffin	Non-album single	
