= Prioleau =

Prioleau is a surname. Notable people with the surname include:

- Betsy Prioleau, American non-fiction author.
- Dijon Prioleau (born 1992), American gospel singer.
- Edward Prioleau Warren (1856–1937), British architect and geologist.
- Hamilton Prioleau Bee (1822-1897), American politician.
- James Prioleau Richards (1894-1979), American politician.
- Pierson Prioleau (born 1977), American football player.
- Samuel Prioleau, American politician.

== See also ==
- John Cordes Prioleau House, a historic mansion in Charleston, South Carolina
