= Begging Me =

Single by Florrie

from the album Experiments
- Released: 28 April 2011
- Genre: Synth-pop; indie pop
- Length: 4:04
- Label: Self-released
- Songwriter(s): Florence Arnold; Miranda Cooper; Brian Higgins; Toby Scott; Frederick Falke; Matt Gray; Owen Parker; Eliza Dodd-Noble
- Producer(s): Xenomania

Florrie singles chronology
"Sunday Girl" (2010)	"Begging Me" (2011)	"I Took a Little Something" (2011)

Music video
- "Begging Me" on YouTube

"Begging Me" is a song by British singer and songwriter Florrie. It was released on 28 April 2011 as the lead single of Florrie's second extended play Experiments via iTunes. It was written by Florrie, Miranda Cooper, Brian Higgins, Toby Scott, Fred Falke, Matt Gray, Owen Parker, and Eliza Dodd-Noble, and produced by the Xenomania team. A remix made by Fred Falke was released as a companion single on 19 December 2011.

== Composition ==
"Begging Me" runs at a fast tempo of 142 beats per minute at the first chorus, and then shifting to 143 beats per minute for the rest of the song. It incorporates elements of pop and pop-rock. The song lasts for four minutes and four seconds. Lyrically, it shows the singer trying to make her partner understand she is the one who decides where their relationship is going to.

== Music video ==
The song received a music video on 25 April 2011, three days prior to its release as the lead single of Experiments. It was produced by Jonny Knight and directed by Price James. The visual features Florrie performing the song in front of a band; in different moments of the video, the vision appears to be blurry at the borders.

== Reception ==
"Begging Me" was generally well received by public, and was considered as one of the highlights of the extended play. Arjan Writes praised the song's "fun" nature, stating that it "is dominated by its bouncy bass and singalong chorus that contrasts nicely with the indie groove of the song's verses". Also, fans of the singer who bought the album in Amazon commented that the song would "infect you", and that it was "highly recommendable [to acquire]".

== Track listings ==
=== Digital download ===
1. Begging Me 4:04

=== Fred Falke Remix - Single ===
1. Begging Me (Fred Falke Remix) 5:50
