= Catch You If You Fall =

Single by Florrie

from the album Magic for a While
- Released: 28 August 2026
- Length: 4:25
- Label: Xenomania; BMG
- Songwriters: Florrie Arnold; Brian Higgins; Ben Taylor; Clara McHugh
- Composers: Arnold; Higgins; Taylor; McHugh
- Producers: Florrie Arnold; Brian Higgins; Ben Taylor

Florrie singles chronology
"Warrior" (2026)	"Catch You If You Fall" (2026)	"Magic for a While" (2026)

Live from Peckham Liberal Club
- "Catch You If You Fall" on YouTube

"Catch You If You Fall" is a song by English singer-songwriter, drummer and model, Florrie. It was released on 28 August 2026 as the fourth single from her second studio album, Magic for a While, through Xenomania UK Limited and BMG.

== Background ==
"Catch You If You Fall" was written by Florrie Arnold, Brian Higgins, Ben Taylor, and Clara McHugh, with Arnold, Higgins, and Taylor also serving as producers. Described by The Guardian as "pensive balladry", it was written from the perspective of Florrie as a child, and pays tribute to her late uncle Martin, who was diagnosed with progressive multiple sclerosis as a teenager. According the song press release, Florrie spent the first four years of her life living with him and continued to visit him regularly until his death. She described the song as a promise to be there for him and a reflection of the significance he held in her life.

"Uncle Mart was diagnosed with MS when he was 17 and never moved away from home, so my nan became his full-time carer and they lived together in a little bungalow in Bristol. I spent five days a week with them until I was four and then went every day after school as I got older. I watched him struggle a lot as his MS progressed, he was in a wheelchair and had lost the use of half his body, but he was never defeated by it, and somehow he stayed so positive right up until the end. I loved helping him, and I think I absorbed all of the love my nan had for him too, because she essentially gave up her life to look after him. They showed me what real love and resilience look like, and I think so much of the empathy I have now comes from growing up with them. Mart taught me not to take anything for granted and to keep life in perspective, because if he could remain positive through everything he had to deal with, then I think there must always be a way through."

— Florrie speaking about the inspiration behind the song, via Northern Transmissions

== Promotion ==
The song was released on 28 August 2026 as the fourth single from Florrie's second studio album, Magic for a While, on which it appears as the fifth track. An accompanying video featuring Florrie performing the song live with her band at Peckham Liberal Club was released on her YouTube channel.

== Track listing ==
Digital download and streaming – Single

1. "Catch You If You Fall" – 4:25

Digital download and streaming – EP

1. "Catch You If You Fall" – 4:25
2. "Warrior" – 4:55
3. "Malibu (Falling Over the Edge)" – 4:15
4. "The Times" – 4:04

== Personnel ==
Credits adapted from Tidal.

- Florrie Arnold – vocalist, producer, composer, author, drum kit, guitar, keyboard
- Brian Higgins – producer, composer, author, programmer
- Ben Taylor – producer, composer, author, engineer, recording engineer, programmer
- Clara McHugh – composer, author
- Fred Faulke – bass guitar
- Shawn Lee – guitar
- Calum Munro – guitar
- Sam Martin – piano
- Ian Curnow – keyboard
- Holly Murray – background vocalist
- Hattie Marsh – background vocalist
- Niara Scarlett – background vocalist
- Ramona Blue – background vocalist
- Rose Reymi – background vocalist
- Vanessa Rogers – background vocalist
- Emily Lazar – mastering engineer
- Bob DeMaa – mastering second engineer
- Manon Grandjean – mixing engineer
- Pablo Mir-Mir Arañó – second engineer, recording, background vocalist

== Release history ==
Release dates and formats
Region	Date	Format(s)	Label	Version	Ref.
Various	28 August 2026	Digital download; streaming	Xenomania; BMG	Single	
Various	28 August 2026	Digital download; streaming	Xenomania; BMG	Extended play	
