= Real Love =

Real Love may refer to:

== Film and television ==
- Real Love (film), a film by Claire Burger

== Music ==
=== Albums ===
- Real Love (Derek Johnson album)
- Real Love (Dolly Parton album), or the title song (see below)
- Real Love (Lisa Stansfield album)
- Real Love (Oh My Girl album)
- Real Love (Sarah Connor album)
- Real Love (Swans album)

=== Songs ===
- "Real Love" (Beatles song), written and first performed by John Lennon
- "Real Love" (Clean Bandit and Jess Glynne song), 2014
- "Real Love" (Dolly Parton and Kenny Rogers song), 1985
- "Real Love" (Doobie Brothers song), 1980
- "Real Love" (Jody Watley song), 1989
- "Real Love" (Lee Ryan song), 2005
- "Real Love" (Lucinda Williams song), 2008
- "Real Love" (Mary J. Blige song), 1992
- "Real Love" (Sarah Connor song), 2010
- "Real Love" (Skyy song), 1989
- "Real Love" (The Time Frequency song), 1992
- "Real Love" (Florrie song), 2016
- "Real Love", by Beach House from Teen Dream, 2010
- "Real Love", by Berryz Kobo from 5, 2008
- "Real Love", by Carly Rae Jepsen from Dedicated, 2019
- "Real Love", by Childish Gambino from Bando Stone & the New World, 2024
- "Real Love", by Cher from Living Proof, 2001
- "Real Love", by Deborah Cooper
- "Real Love", by Dijon Prioleau from A Kid's Point of View, 2007
- "Real Love", by Hillsong Young and Free from their album Youth Revival, 2015
- "Real Love", by Lakeside
- "Real Love", by Massari from Massari, 2005
- "Real Love", by Natasha Bedingfield from Roll with Me, 2019
- "Real Love", by The Smashing Pumpkins from Machina II/The Friends & Enemies of Modern Music, 2000
- "Real Love", by Stephanie Mills from Home, 1989
- "Real Love", by Yes from Talk, 1994

== See also ==
- Amor real, a Mexican telenovela
