= Patrick Alavi =

German musician and DJ

- Also known as: Alavi, Turbofunk, Knabberbox (with Manuel Tur)
- Born: Patrick Alavi; 1978 (age 47–48); Frechen, Germany
- Genres: Funk, House, Electronic music
- Occupations: Record producer, remixer, DJ
- Label: roXour
- Website: patrickalavi.com

Patrick Alavi is a German record producer, remixer and DJ working mainly in funk, house and electronic music.

== Career ==
In 1996, Alavi released his first EP as DJ Alavi on Sonic House, a sub-label of the German techno label Atomic Silence.

In 2001, he signed with Bad Boy Bill's labels Moody Recordings and International House Records. The same year he released two EPs on the French label Vertigo.

In 2004, Kris Menace released two EPs by Alavi on his label Work It Baby. The track "Power" was later re-released in the UK with new mixes on Azuli Records. His track "Come To Me" reached number 3 in the UK Buzz chart.

In 2005, Alavi founded the label roXour, which released music by Benjamin Theves ("Texas", later licensed to Kitsuné with a remix by SebastiAn), Tepr ("En Direct De La Côte", licensed to Wall of Sound), Flairs and others. That year his track "The End" reached number 1 in the UK Buzz chart presented on Pete Tong's BBC Radio 1 show.

In 2007, "Gotta Move", released under the name Turbofunk on Data Records in the UK and N.E.W.S. Records in the Benelux, reached number 79 in the Dutch singles chart. The track samples "Dancing in the Street" by the Peter Jacques Band.

=== Remixes ===
Alavi has produced official remixes for artists including Jamelia, Gossip, Adamski, Shinichi Osawa, Hatiras and Laidback Luke.

=== Compilations ===
His tracks have appeared on compilations released by labels including Universal, Virgin, Modular, Ministry of Sound, Hed Kandi and Kontor.

=== Radio support ===
His records have been played on BBC Radio 1 by DJs including Pete Tong, Annie Mac, Kissy Sellout, Rob Da Bank, Zane Lowe, Fergie, Scott Mills, Dave Pearce and Judge Jules.
