= Reel Love =

Reel Love may refer to:

- Reel Love Presents Tween Hearts, a Philippine television drama romance series
- Reel Love (2011 film), an American made-for-television romantic comedy film
- Reel Love (2025 film), a Nigerian romance film

== See also ==
- Real Love (disambiguation)
