= Little White Lies (Florrie song) =

Single by Florrie
- Released: 15 August 2014
- Genre: Pop; electropop; dance-pop
- Length: 3:04
- Label: Sony Music
- Songwriters: Florence Arnold; Roman Rappak; Annie Yuill; Wayne Hector; Brian Higgins; Toby Scott
- Producers: Higgins; Xenomania

Florrie singles chronology
"Live a Little" (2013)	"Little White Lies" (2014)	"Too Young to Remember" (2015)

"Little White Lies" is a song recorded by English pop singer Florrie. Written by Florence Arnold, Toby Scott, Brian Higgins and Wayne Hector, the song was released on 15 August 2014 as the lead single from Florrie's upcoming debut album. However, the project was shelved, and the single remained as a non-album track. An acoustic version of the song was released onto YouTube on 17 August 2014, on the singer's official account.

== Background and release ==
"Little White Lies" was first released in a remix form created by Shadow Child on Florrie's fourth extended play Sirens, released as an anticipation extended play before Florrie's debut album, intended to be released in 2014. An album sampler of Florrie's debut album surfaced onto the internet later in 2014, including six tracks: "Too Young to Remember", "Turn the World Upside Down", "Galaxies", "Looking for Love In the Wrong Place", "Little White Lies", and "Live a Little"; however, the album was ultimately shelved and the three unreleased songs remained as leaked tracks, while "Little White Lies" and "Live a Little" remained as non-album singles, and "Too Young to Remember" was released forward in 2015. The official studio version of the song premiered on 3 July 2014, and an EP including remixes of the song, the original version, and Florrie edits for her 2010 tracks "Left Too Late" and "Give Me Your Love", was released on August 15.

== Music video ==
A music video for the song was released on 6 July 2014 on the singer's official YouTube account. The video stars Florrie in different scenes like a grassy field and a wooden house. The singer appears performing drums in the field in different moments of the clip. Also, she appears releasing a number of plastic bags to the air, which was interpreted by fans as an analogy to little white lies: one would not produce much harm, but several could impact a lot; in the lyrics, this analogy is appreciated during the chorus.

== Composition ==
The song is an electropop and dance-pop song, which runs at a moderate tempo of 124 beats per minute, set in a 4/4 time signature. "Little White Lies" lasts for three minutes and three seconds. The instrumentation incorporates synthesizers, pads, electric piano, and drums that increase gradually, growing louder towards the end of the song.

== Track listing ==
iTunes EP

Track listing
No.	Title	Writer(s)	Producer(s)	Length
1.	"Little White Lies"	Arnold; Higgins; Scott; Hector; Yuill; Rappak	Xenomania	3:04
2.	"Little White Lies" (Florrie Remix)	Arnold; Higgins; Scott; Hector; Yuill; Rappak	Xenomania; Florrie	4:52
3.	"Little White Lies" (Shadow Child Remix)	Arnold; Higgins; Scott; Hector; Yuill; Rappak	Xenomania; Shadow Child	4:56
4.	"Little White Lies" (Moon Boots Remix)	Arnold; Higgins; Scott; Hector; Yuill; Rappak	Xenomania; Moon Boots	5:26
5.	"Little White Lies" (Wideboys Remix)	Arnold; Higgins; Scott; Hector; Yuill; Rappak	Xenomania; Wideboys	5:51
6.	"Little White Lies" (KDA Remix)	Arnold; Higgins; Scott; Hector; Yuill; Rappak	Xenomania; KDA	7:49
7.	"Left Too Late" (Florrie Edit)	Arnold; Cooper; Higgins; Falke; Scott; Dodd-Noble	Xenomania; Florrie	4:15
8.	"Give Me Your Love" (Florrie Edit)	Arnold; Cooper; Higgins; Falke; Resch; Jones; Scott	Xenomania; Florrie	3:57
