= Malibu (Falling Over the Edge) =

Single by Florrie

from the album Magic for a While
- Released: 3 July 2026
- Genre: Pop
- Length: 4:16
- Label: Xenomania; BMG
- Songwriters: Florrie Arnold; Brian Higgins; Ben Taylor; Jason Resch; Kris Ryeland
- Composers: Florrie Arnold; Brian Higgins; Ben Taylor; Jason Resch; Kris Ryeland
- Producers: Florrie Arnold; Brian Higgins; Ben Taylor

Florrie singles chronology
"The Times" (2026)	"Malibu (Falling Over the Edge)" (2026)	"Warrior" (2026)

Visualiser
- "Malibu (Falling Over the Edge)" on YouTube

"Malibu (Falling Over the Edge)" is a song by English singer-songwriter, drummer and model, Florrie. It was released on 3 July 2026 as the second single from her second studio album, Magic for a While, through Xenomania UK Limited and BMG.

== Background and release ==
According to Florrie, "Malibu (Falling Over the Edge)" explores themes of “friendship, obsession, and that feeling of wanting to be around someone all the time". She described the song a "big sister" to her 2010 debut single "Call 911" and her 2011 single "I Took A Little Something" explaining that "Malibu" is "a song full of nostalgia" about a "really magical time" of her life when she was "young, carefree and still figuring out things out." The single was released on 3 July 2026. The single cover was photographed by Joe Connor. A visualiser for the song was released on the same day through Florrie's YouTube channel, featuring the singer dancing to the track. A remix by South African musician St. Lucia was released on 24 July 2026 as part of the song's promotion. The track appears as the ninth track on Magic for a While.

== Composition ==
While reviewing the track, Vee Dee of Fame Magazine described the production of "Malibu (Falling Over the Edge)" as combining elements associated with Xenomania's production style with contemporary "polished" and "glossy" pop. The song was written by Florrie Arnold, Brian Higgins, Ben Taylor, Jason Resch, and Kris Ryeland, with Arnold, Higgins and Taylor also handling its production.

== Track listing ==
Digital download and streaming

1. "Malibu (Falling Over the Edge)" – 4:16
2. "The Times" – 4:04

Digital download and streaming – St. Lucia Remix

1. "Malibu (Falling Over the Edge)" (St. Lucia remix) – 4:24

== Personnel ==
Credits adapted from Tidal.

- Florrie Arnold – vocalist, producer, composer, author, drum kit, guitar, keyboard
- Brian Higgins – producer, composer, author, programmer
- Ben Taylor – producer, composer, author, engineer, recording engineer, programmer, guitar
- Jason Resch – composer, author, second engineer, recording, guitar
- Kris Ryeland – composer, author, programmer, keyboard
- Holly Murray – background vocalist
- Pablo Mir-Mir Arañó – second engineer, recording, background vocalist
- Ramona Blue – background vocalist
- Rose Teymi – background vocalist
- Vanessa Rogers – background vocalist
- Shawn Lee – guitar
- Emily Lazar – mastering engineer
- Bob Demaa – mastering second engineer
- Manon Grandjean – mixing engineer

== Release history ==
Release dates and formats
Region	Date	Format(s)	Version	Label	Ref.
Various	3 July 2026	Digital download; streaming	Original	Xenomania; BMG	
Various	24 July 2026	Digital download; streaming	St. Lucia Remix	Xenomania; BMG	
