= Personal (Florrie album) =

Compilation album by Florrie
- Released: 8 December 2023
- Recorded: 2018–2022
- Genre: Pop; synthpop
- Length: 35:56
- Label: Xenomania UK Limited
- Producer: Florrie; Brian Higgins; Ben Taylor; 808Bhav808; Toby Scott

Florrie chronology
Sirens (2014)	Personal (2023)	The Lost Ones (2024)

Personal is the first compilation album released by English singer-songwriter, drummer, and model Florrie. It comprises most of her singles released from 2019 to 2023, beginning with "Borderline" and ending with its title track "Personal". It was released to streaming platforms on 8 December 2023.

== Background and release ==
Florrie announced via her social media that ahead of her debut album releasing on 2024, she would drop a compilation album that would include all her stand-alone singles released previously (with the exception of her 2020 single "Butterflies"), as she was ready to start a new chapter on her musical career.

Music videos were released for the singles "Borderline" and "Communicate". 'Borderline' was featured on the fifteen season of ABC hit medical drama series "Grey's Anatomy" on a crossover episode with the series "Station 19", in the episode "What I Did For Love". Meanwhile, the title track, "Personal" was played for the first time by Mollie King on BBC Radio 1 on 14 December 2023.

== Reception ==
Reviewing the title track which was released the same day as the compilation, Jason Lipshutz from Billboard Magazine said that Florrie "has provided a stocking stuffer for longtime fans with “Personal,” a deeply felt account of a dissolving relationship that still finds the strength to be molded into uplifting indie-pop", as well pointing out that Arnold "sounds assured in her craft and radiant in her delivery."

== Track listing ==
No.	Title	Writer(s)	Producer(s)	Length
1.	"Personal"	Florrie Arnold; Ben Taylor; Brian Higgins; Clara McHugh; Grace Medford; Keir MacCulloch; Kyle Mackenzie; Owen Parker	Florrie Arnold; Brian Higgins; Ben Taylor	3:25
2.	"Street Lights"	Arnold; Taylor; Higgins; Toby Scott; Archie Campbell	Arnold; Higgins; Toby Scott	3:09
3.	"Hours"	Arnold; Taylor; Higgins; Scott	Arnold; Higgins; Scott	3:16
4.	"Borderline"	Arnold; Taylor; Higgins; MacCulloch; Mackenzie	Arnold; Higgins	3:19
5.	"Walk Away"	Arnold; Higgins; Scott; Campbell	Arnold; Higgins; Scott	3:09
6.	"Garden"	Arnold; Taylor; Higgins; Medford; Scott	Arnold; Higgins	2:46
7.	"Falling Back To You"	Arnold; Taylor; Higgins; Campbell	Arnold; Higgins; Taylor	2:40
8.	"Communicate"	Arnold; Taylor; Higgins; Campbell	Arnold; Higgins; Taylor	2:50
9.	"Hell or High Water"	Arnold; Taylor; Higgins; Sarah Thompson; MacCulloch; Mackenzie; Parker	Arnold; Higgins	2:47
10.	"Human"	Arnold; Taylor; Higgins; Bhavik Pattani; Isaiah Dreads; Thompson; Takura Tendayi; Parker	Arnold; Higgins; 808Bhav808; Taylor	2:48
11.	"What If I'm Wrong"	Arnold; Taylor; Higgins; McHugh	Arnold; Higgins; Taylor	2:52
12.	"Unstable"	Arnold; Taylor; Higgins; Thompson; MacCulloch; Mackenzie	Arnold; Higgins	2:48
Total length:				35:56

== Release history ==
Release history and formats for "Personal"
Region	Date	Format	Label	Ref.
Various	8 December 2023	Digital download; streaming	Xenomania UK Limited	
