= Florrie =

English pop singer-songwriter, drummer and model

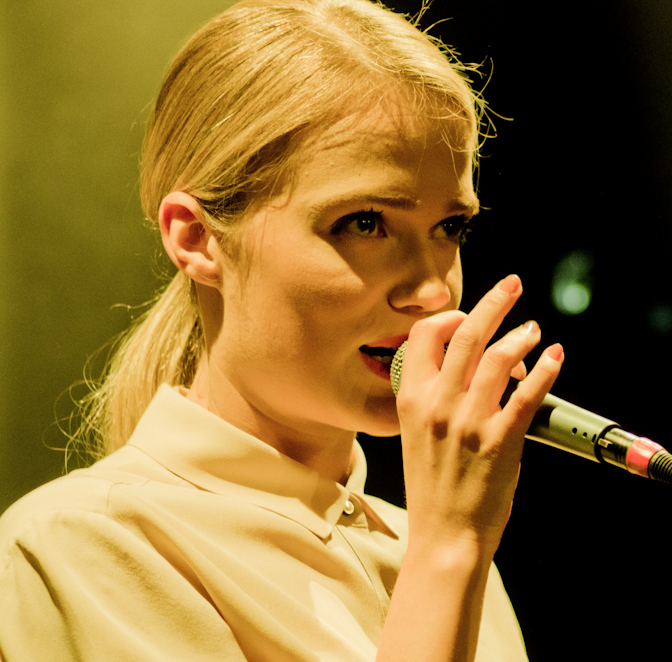
- Florrie live at La Maroquinerie, Paris (2011)

Background information
- Born: Florence Ellen Arnold; 28 December 1988 (age 37); Bristol, England
- Genres: Pop; synth-pop; dance-pop; indie pop; pop rock
- Occupations: Singer-songwriter; drummer; model
- Instruments: Vocals; drums; guitar
- Years active: 2008–present
- Labels: Sony Music; Epic
- Website: florrie.com

Florence Ellen Arnold (born 28 December 1988), better known as Florrie, is an English pop singer-songwriter, drummer and model. Closely associated with the Xenomania production house, since joining as their in-house drummer in 2008 she has played live and on record for popular artists such as Kylie Minogue, Girls Aloud and the Pet Shop Boys.

In 2010, she began a solo career. She has drawn positive reaction from the online music community for releasing her own material in collaboration with remixers such as Fred Falke for download without charge. In 2010, Florrie released a four-track EP titled Introduction, followed by the six-track EP Experiments in 2011, and by the four-track EP Late in 2012. In 2013, Florrie released a single, "Live a Little", that was used in promotion for Sony's XBA-C10 in-ear headphones campaign. In 2014, she announced that she had signed to a major label, Sony Music, and released an EP, Sirens. She would eventually depart with the major record label, and comeback as an independent artist on 2019 with the release of "Borderline", which would be later included on her first compilation project titled Personal, released on 2023. Her long-awaited debut studio album, The Lost Ones, was released on 14 June 2024, which was promoted with a couple of singles, including "Kissing in the Cold". Florrie released her second studio album, Magic for a While on 16 October 2026, which spawned five singles, such as "Malbu (Falling Over the Edge)" and "Catch You If You Fall".

== Biography ==
=== Early life and career ===
Florrie was born Florence Arnold on 28 December 1988 in Bristol, where she attended Colston's Girls' School. She left school at 17. She became interested in playing the drums when she was in Greece on a family holiday at age six. As a teenager she started her own band called Fi Fi Saloon, which performed Avril Lavigne covers and original songs she described as "really trash, punky girl rock-pop". She moved to London when she was 17 years old and gigged with several bands including Selfservice, who signed a development deal with songwriter Guy Chambers. Florrie performed with Selfservice at night and worked part-time as a nanny during the day.

A meeting with the manager of Australian singer Gabriella Cilmi led Florrie to a successful audition as the drummer in the houseband of Xenomania, the successful Kent-based production team. Prior to joining Xenomania, she worked at GAP and quit as soon as she was offered a job as a professional drummer. Her first job was playing on Girls Aloud's 2008 single "The Promise", although she also assisted with administration work. She provided drums and drum programming on Xenomania-produced tracks by Alesha Dixon, Rebecca Ferguson, Kylie Minogue, Pet Shop Boys, and The Saturdays. She also co-wrote the 2010 single "One Touch" for the short-lived female duo Mini Viva, "Something New" (2012) for Girls Aloud, and "What Are You Waiting For?" (2014) for The Saturdays. Xenomania producer Brian Higgins encouraged Florrie to sing one of the songs she had written, which prompted her to pursue her own music career.

=== Independent releases ===
Florrie featured in Nina Ricci advert for the fragrance Nina L'Elixir in 2010.

Florrie's debut release, a Fred Falke remix of "Call 911", reportedly had over 1,000 downloads around the world within a few days of its February 2010 release. In mid-2010, Florrie was announced as the face of the then-new Nina Ricci fragrance Nina L'Elixir. She starred in the TV advert for the campaign performing a cover of Blondie's "Sunday Girl", and also featured in print advertisements shot by Ruvén Afanador. In July 2010, Florrie featured on The Guardian's "New Band of the Day" column. Besides these two tracks, three more were released as remix-only versions: "Panic Attack" (April 2010), "Fascinate Me" and "Come Back to Mine" (May 2010).

Florrie released her debut EP, Introduction, in November 2010 through the iTunes Store. The EP was made available for free download on her official website, as well as on 12" vinyl pressings limited to 500 copies. Music blogs Popjustice, ArjanWrites.com, electronic rumors, Dödselectro and Sundtrak praised the quality of the music, while noting the free availability of the tracks and expressing interest for future material. Others identified how the awareness of Florrie's music has been assisted by online social networks and a grassroots strategy. Florrie told Ponystep magazine:

I think it's really important to have that contact with fans and for them to be able to buy into your world or you as a person without any pressure from a corporation ... It's a better way of doing it because people can feel like they discovered you as opposed to a major label. I want my fans to feel like they have some sort of ownership.

Florrie's second EP, Experiments, was released in June 2011 to a five-star review from About.com. The lead single, "Begging Me" was released in April 2011. The music video for the second single, "I Took a Little Something", was a collaboration with fashion house Dolce & Gabbana. A third EP, Late, was released in May 2012 on iTunes, accompanied by the single "Shot You Down". MuuMuse wrote of the EP, "Every inch of the record is one carefully crafted hook after another; each pulsating beat more danceable and jaw-dropping than the next".

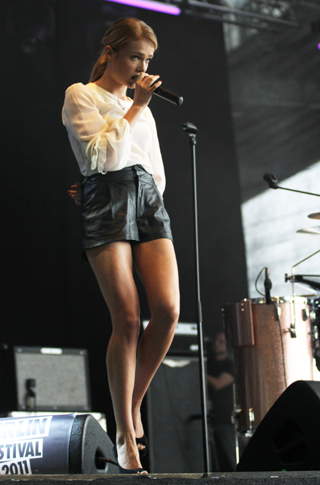
Florrie performing at Berlin Festival 2011

=== Time at Sony Music (2012 to 2016) ===
Florrie announced on her website in mid-2012 that she would sign to a major record label, thus making Late her final release as an independent artist; this label was later reported as being Sony Music. In February 2013, Florrie was announced as the face of denim label Vigoss for its spring 2013 campaign. Florrie appears in the commercial for Sony's XBA-C10 in-ear headphones, which debuted in April 2013 and features the track "Live a Little".

Florrie released her fourth EP, Sirens, in April 2014, with music videos accompanying three of the tracks. A single, "Little White Lies", followed in August 2014. The music video for Florrie's 2015 single "Too Young to Remember" was premiered online via fashion retailer H&M, who selected the singer to front their worldwide H&M Loves Music campaign. Her debut album was originally announced for 2015 and was planned for release in late 2016, following a series of festival appearances and other live dates. Florrie has been recording with songwriters and producers including Joel Little, Tim Anderson, MoZella, Jesse Shatkin, and Twin, the latter of whom produced and co-wrote Florrie's single "Real Love" (released in early 2016). Due to Sony and Florrie's creative visions clashing, the two had parted ways as it was said that Sony enticed her to drift away from making music from Xenomania and work with others. This also meant that the album was scrapped. Arnold revealed in a 2024 interview that her time spent under a major recording label was "a bit of a nightmare".

=== Comeback as independent artist (2019 to present) ===
In 2019, she made a musical comeback with the single "Borderline", where she was currently signed to Xenomania's newly established self-titled label. She was also announced as a member of the group Capulets, with whom she plays and writes for. She also released another single later on in the year, entitled "Unstable", where she could be gearing up to release a new project. From 2019 to 2023, Arnold released a total of twelve singles, eleven of which would be part of Florrie's first compilation album title Personal, with the song "Butterfles" being left out of the project. Personal, included a brand new song of the same name, with the compilation release, Florrie stated that she closed a chapter and announced that her debut album would be finally released on 2024. Her debut album The Lost Ones was released in June 2024. The album debuted at number 36 in the UK.

In August 2024, Florrie released a new single titled "Swimming Pool", alongside its music video. As of spring 2025, Arnold revealed on her official Instagram account that she was writing new music with the intention of making a second album.

In June 2026, Florrie announced her second studio album, Magic For a While, alongside its lead single, "The Times". The album was developed from drum loops and ideas she began recording in Los Angeles in early 2025, and was made with longtime collaborator Brian Higgins. It was released on 16 October 2026 through BMG and Xenomania.

== Musical style ==
In an interview with Ponystep, Florrie described her style as "a big mixture: Kind of a sixties, organic feel merged with modern pop beats and electronics". She also told Metro, "I grew up listening to my dad's Beatles records but I love electronic music, I like doing upbeat stuff to make people dance." The Guardian writer Paul Lester said about Florrie that "she completely bypasses the sweaty authenticity of groaning determination for a slicker, brighter sort of pop desire. This comes across in her music. It's breezy". Time magazine wrote in 2014 that "Her brand of pop music is playful, propulsive, and built around rhythm, bearing the influence of her work as a session drummer for the songwriting/production squad Xenomania".

== Personal life ==
After the release of her fourth EP, Sirens, Florrie met and began dating George Ezra with whom she was romantically involved for three years, until it was reported that they split up in early 2020. Arnold lived in Los Angeles briefly during the release and touring period of her debut album. She moved back to the UK in spring 2025. As of summer 2025, she lives between London, Brighton, and Bristol.

== Discography ==
Studio albums

- The Lost Ones (2024)
- Magic For a While (2026)

Extended plays

- Introduction (2010)
- Experiments (2011)
- Late (2012)
- Sirens (2014)

Compilations

- Personal (2023)
