= Swimming Pool (song) =

- Single cover

Single by Florrie
- Released: August 30, 2024
- Genre: Synth-pop; funk-pop
- Length: 3:24
- Label: Xenomania UK Limited
- Composers: Florrie; Brian Higgins; Ben Taylor; Cameron Williams-Hill; Xan Griffin; Yoad Nevo
- Producers: Florrie; Ben Taylor; Brian Higgins

Florrie singles chronology
"Looking for Love" (2024)	"Swimming Pool" (2024)

Music video
- "Swimming Pool" on YouTube

"Swimming Pool" is a song by English singer-songwriter, drummer and model, Florrie. It was released on 30 August 2024 through Xenomania UK Limited. It marks her first single since the release of her debut album The Lost Ones (2024). It was written by Arnold, Ben Taylor, Brian Higgins, Cameron Williams-Hill, Xan Griffin. and Yoad Nevo. It was produced by Arnold, Taylor and Higgins.

== Background ==
"Swimming Pool" is a synth-pop track with disco influences, which are blended with bass lines and guitar riffs, and features Florrie's signature drums. Florrie first teased the track at the start of August, she revelead that she wrote the song last summer and that she "wanted to put it out for a while, but didn't feel like it fit on the album thematically".

To promote the release of the song, Florrie posted different pictures, and asked her fans to help her to decide which one should be chosen as the single artwork.

== Reception ==
The song was met with positive reviews by music critics. Sam Taylor, for Dork magazine, described the song as a "carefree summer single". Jo Forrest for Total Entertainment praised the song dubbing it as "playful" and "perfect to wrap up the summer", Forrest described Florrie's vocal performance as "ethereal", as well calling it a future "fan-favorite".

== Music video ==
An accompanying music video was shot and edited by long-time collaborator Archie Campbell. It depicts Arnold wearing a red bathing suit with sunglasses in a swimming pool along with several red floating devices. The music video was released alongside the song on Florrie's YouTube channel, on August 30, 2024.

== Track listing ==
- Digital download and streaming
1. "Swimming Pool" – 3:24
- Digital download and streaming – Pool Party House Mix
1. "Swimming Pool" (Pool Party House Mix) – 3:28
2. "Swimming Pool" – 3:24
- Digital download and streaming – Deep End Mix
1. "Swimming Pool" (Deep End Mix) – 3:20
2. "Swimming Pool" (Pool Party House Mix) – 3:28
3. "Swimming Pool" – 3:24

== Release history ==
Release dates and formats for "Swimming Pool"
Region	Date	Format	Label	Version	Ref.
Various	30 August 2024	Digital download; streaming	Xenomania UK Limited; BMG	Original	
Various	4 October 2024	Digital download; streaming	Xenomania UK Limited; BMG	Pool Party House Mix	
Various	18 October 2024	Digital download; streaming	Xenomania UK Limited; BMG	Deep End Mix	

== See also ==
- Florrie discography
