= Compuphonic =

Electronic music record label

Compuphonic is an electronic music record label created by Kris Menace as a playground for his own productions.

Artists besides Kris Menace who have been featured in releases on Compuphonic are Felix Da Housecat, Fred Falke, Romanthony, Robert Owens, Miss Kittin, Simon Lord, Xavier Naidoo, Unai, Thomas Gandey, Spooky, Chelonis R. Jones, Douze, Julian Hamilton from The Presets, Rex the Dog and others.

== Albums ==
- Features (2012)
- Electric Horizon (April 2012)
- Idiosyncrasies (Special Edition) (April 2010)
- Selected (April 2009) (iTunes Only)
- Idiosyncrasies (April 2009)

== Singles ==
- Kris Menace – Voyage (Compuphonic / 2005)
- Kris Menace – Jupiter (Compuphonic / 2006)
- Kris Menace feat. Fred Falke – Fairlight (Compuphonic / 2007)
- Kris Menace – Steamroller (Compuphonic / 2008)
- Kris Menace & Spooky – Stereophonic (Compuphonic / 2008)
- Kris Menace & Felix da Housecat - Artificial (Compuphonic /2008)
- Kris Menace – Scaler (Compuphonic / 2009)
- Kris Menace- Walking on the Moon (U-Tern Bootleg) (2010)
- Menace & Tracid - Buchla 200e (Compuphonic / 2011)
- Rex the Dog & Kris Menace - POW! (Compuphonic / 2011)
- Adam Shaw & Kris Menace - Starchild EP (Compuphonic / 2011)
- Kris Menace - eLove EP (4 Tracks) (Compuphonic / 2011)
- Kris Menace & Douze - Hexo / Overflow (Compuphonic / 2011)
- Kris Menace - Falling Star (Compuphonic / 2012)
- Kris Menace - eFeel (Compuphonic / 2012)
- The Kiki Twins & Kris Menace - We Are (Compuphonic / 2012)
- Kris Menace feat. Miss Kittin - Hide (Remixes) (Compuphonic / 2012)
- Kris Menace feat. Unai - Lone Runner (Remixes) (Compuphonic / 2012)
- Kris Menace feat. Robert Owens - Trusting Me (Remixes) (Compuphonic / 2013)
- Kris Menace feat. Chelonis R. Jones - Voodoo Dilate (SAMO) (Remixes) (Compuphonic / 2013)

== See also ==
- List of record labels
