= Kissing in the Cold =

Single by Florrie

from the album The Lost Ones
- Released: April 19, 2024
- Genre: Synth-pop
- Length: 3:54
- Label: Xenomania UK; BMG
- Songwriters: Florrie; Pablo Mir-Mir Arañó; Brian Higgins; Keir MacCulloch; Kyle Mackenzie; Clara McHugh; Owen Parker; M. Kovacs; Ben Taylor; Takura Tendayi
- Producers: Florrie; Brian Higgins; Ben Taylor

Florrie singles chronology
"The Lost Ones" (2024)	"Kissing in the Cold" (2024)	"Never Far from Paradise" (2024)

Music video
- "Kissing in the Cold" on YouTube

"Kissing in the Cold" is a song by English singer-songwriter, drummer and model, Florrie. It was released on 19 April 2024 as the second single from her debut album, The Lost Ones, through Xenomania UK Limited and BMG. On November 8, a christmas-themed version titled, "Kissing in the Cold" (Mistletoe Version) was released.

== Composition ==
"Kissing in the Cold" was written by Florrie Arnold, Brian Higgins, Ben Taylor, Keir MacCulloch, Kyle Mackenzie, Clara McHugh, Pablo Mir-Mir Arañó, Owen Parker and Takura Tendayi. Brad Stratton of Sport Playlist described the song as "reflection on a past relationship, contemplating how things might have unfolded had they met at another point in their lives."

== Release and promotion ==
"This song is my favourite from the new album, and is both full of hope and longing. I think it’s something everyone has been through at some point in their lives; looking back and wondering if they made the right decision."

— Florrie, speaking with DORK magazine.

Speaking with Sam Taylor of DORK magazine for the single release day, Florrie revelead that "Kissing in the Cold" was her favourite track of her debut album The Lost Ones. She went further describing the lyrics as "relatable" and "full of hope and longing".

A music video directed by Archie Campbell, was released alongside the single on Florrie's YouTube channel. Explaining her creative process for the video, Arnold said that she really wanted to create a nostalgic feeling, "a hazy memory that pops into your head when you’re just falling asleep". The music video was shot in Northampton, England and sees Florrie walking through the streets on a snowing day, while singing the lyrics.

== Reception ==
The song received positive reviews. Jo Forrest of TotalNtertainment dubbed the song as "stunning" and complemented how the track showcased Florrie's "delicate" and "emotive vocals". Writing for Medium, Hugh at ZephyrHillMusic expressed being "hooked" and "mesmerised" with track, praising the production and composition, saying that "I immediately hit the replay button if I’m honest. I wanted to go back into the trance." While reviewing The Lost Ones, Sebas E. Alonso of Jenesaispop named "Kissing in the Cold" one of the highlights tracks of the record, describing it as a "cinematic mid-tempo drenched in neon colors".

== Track listing ==
Digital download and streaming

1. "Kissing in the Cold" – 3:54

Digital download and streaming - Spotify

1. "Kissing in the Cold" – 3:54
2. "The Lost Ones" – 3:41

Digital download and streaming - Mistletoe Version

1. "Kissing in the Cold" (Mistletoe Version) – 4:01

Digital download and streaming - EP

1. "Kissing in the Cold" – 3:54
2. "Kissing in the Cold" (Acoustic) – 3:46
3. "Kissing in the Cold" (Mistletoe Version) – 4:01
4. "Kissing in the Cold" (Sped Up) – 3:03
5. "Kissing in the Cold" (Slowed) – 4:28

== Credits and personnel ==
Credits adapted from Apple Music.

- Florrie – vocals, songwriting, production, guitar, keyboards
- Brian Higgins – producer, songwriting, programming
- Ben Taylor – producer, songwriting, programming, recording engineer
- Keir MacCulloch – programming, songwriting
- Kyle Mackenzie – programming, songwriting
- Clara McHugh – songwriting
- Pablo Mir-Mir Arañó – background vocals, songwriting, recording engineer
- Owen Parker – background vocals, songwriting, keyboards
- Takura Tendayi – songwriting
- Holly Murray – background vocals
- Jada Grinage – background vocals
- Sarah Thompson – background vocals
- Hattie Marsh – background vocals
- Vanessa Rogers – background vocals
- Shawn Lee – guitar
- Jason Resch – guitar
- Dick Beetham – recording engineer, mastering engineer
- Manon Grandjean – recording engineer, mixing engineer

== Release history ==
Region	Date	Format	Version	Label	Ref.
Various	April 19, 2024	Digital download; streaming	Original	Xenomania; BMG	
Various	November 8, 2024	Digital download; streaming	Mistletoe	Xenomania; BMG	

== See also ==
- Florrie discography
