= I Took a Little Something (song) =

2011 song by Florrie

- Dance Package cover

Single by Florrie

from the album Experiments
- Released: 18 July 2011
- Genre: Pop; synth-pop; dance-pop; electropop
- Length: 4:12
- Label: Self-released
- Songwriter(s): Florence Arnold; Miranda Cooper; Brian Higgins; Toby Scott; Frederick Falke; Uzoechi Emenike; Keith Reid; Cristopher Thompson
- Producer(s): Xenomania

Florrie singles chronology
| "Begging Me" (2010) | "I Took a Little Something" (2011) | "Shot You Down" (2012) |

Music video
- "I Took a Little Something" on YouTube

"I Took a Little Something" is a song performed by British singer and songwriter Florrie. It was released on 18 July 2011 as the second single off her second extended play Experiments. The song was released onto iTunes along with a remix bundle, entitled I Took a Little Something (Dance Package). A dance-pop song, it was written by Florrie, Miranda Cooper, Brian Higgins, Toby Scott, Fred Falke, MNEK, Keith Reid, and Cristopher Thompson, and produced by the Xenomania team.

== Composition ==
"I Took a Little Something" is set at a moderate tempo of 122 beats per minute. The song is a pop, synth-pop, dance-pop and electropop song that incorporates 80's-inspired instrumentation like drums, synths and pads. The song structure repeats several times the chorus over the song, which lasts for four minutes and twelve seconds.

== Music video ==
Despite "I Took a Little Something" not being released as a single until July 2011, Dolce & Gabbana released a promotional campaign using the song as background on 22 June 2011. The promotional video also stars Florrie wearing products of the company, such as clothing, shoes, underwear, among others. The singer also appears walking on Paris streets, and shopping. The promotional film was directed by Justin Wu.

== Reception ==
The song received overall positive reviews. Niall McMurray stated of the song that it is "one of those incredibly simple, astonishingly effective records in which the verse and chorus turn out to be the same thing", praising the catchy sounds of the hook. Also, in the Rate Your Music website, a platform in which users can review and comment their opinions about different recordings, some users commented about the song that it was an "A-grade song", along with "Experimenting with Rugs". "I Took a Little Something" is considered to be one of the highlights of Experiments, along with "Experimenting with Rugs" and the lead single "Begging Me".

== Track listing ==
=== Digital download ===
1. I Took a Little Something (Fred Falke Club Mix) 6:22
2. I Took a Little Something (Loverush UK! Club Mix) 6:50
3. I Took a Little Something (Loverush UK! Radio Edit) 3:30
4. I Took a Little Something (Original Version) 4:12
5. I Took a Little Something (Radio Edit) 3:33

== 2024 version ==
"I Took a Little Something (2024 Version)"

Song by Florrie

from the album The Lost Ones
- Released: June 14, 2024
- Genre: Pop
- Length: 3:30
- Label: Xenomania UK Limited
- Songwriter(s): Florrie Arnold; Brian Higgins; Christopher Thompson; Frederick Falke; Keith ReidMiranda Cooper; Toby Scott; Uzoechi Emenike
- Producer(s): Florrie; Brian Higgins

Florrie re-recorded "I Took a Little Something", subtitled "2024 Version", for her long-awaited debut studio album, The Lost Ones, released on June 14, 2024, through Xenomania UK Limited and BMG. Arnold revelead the news about the re-recording alongside the album tracklist in March 2024.

The song length was cut to 3 minutes and 30 seconds, and was extensively rewritten and features a new structure.

=== Credits and personnel ===
Credits adapted from Spotify

- Florrie Arnold — performer, producer, songwriter
- Brian Higgins — producer, songwriter
- Christopher Thompson — songwriter
- Frederick Falke — songwriter
- Keith Reid — songwriter
- Miranda Cooper — songwriter
- Toby Scott — songwriter
- Uzoechi Emenike — songwriter
