= Call 911 (song) =

- the remixes cover

Single by Florrie
- Released: 12 July 2010
- Genre: Pop; dance-pop; electropop
- Length: 7:07 (Fred Falke Main Mix)
- Label: Self-released
- Songwriters: Florence Arnold; Miranda Cooper; Brian Higgins; Frederick Falke; Toby Scott; Carla Williams
- Producer: Xenomania

Florrie singles chronology
"Call 911" (2010)	"Sunday Girl" (2010)

"Call 911" is a song performed by British singer and songwriter Florrie. The song was released as the singer's debut single on 12 July 2010 as a remix bundle onto iTunes. It was written by Florrie, Miranda Cooper, Brian Higgins, Fred Falke, Toby Scott, and Carla Williams. The song was released as a remix by Fred Falke, but no original version was released.

== Background and release ==
Florrie was a drummer in the Xenomania production and writing team since 2008. During 2010, it was announced that she would pursue a solo career as a singer, releasing a promotional track, "Panic Attack", on 19 April 2010. The song was released as a Fred Falke remix only, with further remixes being released later, up to 2013. In June 2010 it was announced that she would release for purchase her debut single, titled "Call 911" (released for free download back in February 2010) as an "early introduction to Florrie, ahead her debut album next year", since a debut album by the singer was initially planned to be released in 2011. Ahead the release of "Call 911", further songs were released, prior to a major release, her debut extended play Introduction. The songs were titled "Come Back to Mine" and "Fascinate Me", both released as remixes without original versions. These songs were released on 31 May 2010 for free download. Then, Introduction was released on 15 November 2010 via Florrie's official website for free download.

== Composition ==
Running for seven minutes and seven seconds, the Fred Falke version of the song (which is the most known) is set at a moderate tempo of 127 beats per minute at a 4/4 time signature. The song is a pop, dance-pop and electropop song with incorporates the typical base of Falke's productions, fulfilled with synthesizers, pads and around 80 drum sets, with additional claps, heavy hits, and a piano arrangement during the bridge.

== Reception ==
"Call 911" received overall positive reviews, focusing on Fred Falke's production and Florrie's vocals. A variety of blogs and websites showed their admiration towards the remix, stating that the song is "so good that it will make you want to weep slightly". In CMU Daily, it was stated that "her vocals are good, too. Strong without too much affectation, and with a similar tone to that of Little Boots". The Secret DJ website published about the song that it "sounds like a good way to make us feel like it's Friday night on this dreary Wednesday morning". Writing for BBC America, Kevin Wicks placed "Call 911" at number 13 in his list of the best British songs of 2010, calling the track "sexually charged", and comparing Florrie to Girls Aloud, Annie, and Robyn.

== Track listing ==
=== Kitsuné x Ponystep: Call 911 (The Remixes) - EP ===
1. Call 911 (Fred Falke Remix) 7:07
2. Call 911 (Bart B More Remix) 6:27
3. Call 911 (Beataucue Remix) 5:56
4. Call 911 (His Majesty André Call Me Instead Remix) 4:37
