= Work It Baby =

German record label

Work It Baby is a record label based in Germany and owned by Kris Menace.

== Artists ==
Released artists include Fred Falke, Savage, Menace & Adam, Lifelike, Serge Santiago.

== Releases ==
The 10th Anniversary Label Compilation features 35 Tracks on 2 CDs which includes all previous Work It Baby releases, alongside unreleased exclusive tracks from Patrick Alavi, Fred Falke, Kris Menace, Jaunt, Savage, Charlie Fanclub and a guest vocal performance from Princess Superstar.

WIB 001 Relight – Operator (12", S/Sided)
WIB 002 Stars On 33 – I Feel Music In Your Heart (12", S/Sided)
WIB 003 Montana – The One 4 Me (12", S/Sided, Ltd)
WIB 004 Heartbreakers, The – Heartbreaker (12")
WIB 004 LTD Heartbreakers, The – Can't Stop Lovin' You (12", S/Sided, Ltd)
WIB 005 Patrick Alavi – Power & Glory (12")
WIB 006 Menace & Adam – Missile Test (12")
WIB 007 Lifelike – Running Out incl. Sebastien Leger Remix (12", Ltd)
WIB 008 Menace & Adam vs. Quartet – Rock Dat Shit (12")
WIB 009 Patrick Alavi – Come 2 Me (12")
WIB 010 Fred Falke / Savage (8) – Omega Man / Wait For Love (12"/Digital)
WIB 011 Jaunt – Travelling EP (12"/Digital)
WIB 012 Medway & Glen L* Presents Eva* – Builder (12"/Digital)
WIB 013 Trilogyyy – Apocalypse Rock (12"/Digital)
WIB 014 Fred Falke – Music for my friends EP (12"/Digital)
WIB 015 Charlie Fanclub – Nightbreed EP (12"/Digital)
WIB 016 Jaunt – Lipstick (12"/Digital, S/Sided)
WIB 017 Donovan feat. G.Rizo – Breaking E.P. (12"/Digital)
WIB 018 Moonbootica – Strobelight incl. Kris Menace Remix (12"/Digital)
WIB 019 Fred Falke – Chicago (12"/Digital)
WIB 020 Work it Baby 10th Anniversary Label Compilation (CD/Digital)
WIB 021 Savage feat. Fred Falke – Muzak E.P. (12"/Digital)
WIB 022 Xinobi – Day Off (12"/Digital)
WIB 023 Charlie Fanclub – Duke E.P. (12"/Digital)
