= Magic for a While =

Studio album by Florrie
- Released: 16 October 2026
- Length: 50:37
- Labels: Xenomania UK; BMG
- Producers: Florrie Arnold; Brian Higgins; Ben Taylor; Tyler Chester; Mike Viola

Florrie chronology
The Lost Ones (2024)	Magic for a While (2026)

Singles from Magic for a While
- 1. "The Times" Released: 5 June 2026; 2. "Malibu (Falling Over the Edge)" Released: 3 July 2026; 3. "Warrior" Released: 31 July 2026; 4. "Catch You If You Fall" Released: 28 August 2026; 5. "Magic for a While" Released: 25 September 2026

Magic for a While is the second studio album by the English pop singer-songwriter, drummer, and model Florrie. It was released on 16 October 2026 through Xenomania UK Limited and BMG.

== Background ==
Magic for a While marks Florrie's first major project following her debut studio album, The Lost Ones, released in 2024. In the interim, she released two standalone singles: "Swimming Pool" and "Pieces". According to Florrie, the album began taking shape in early 2025 while she was living alone in Los Angeles. In an interview with The Line of Best Fit, she explained, "I wanted the record to feel live, I wanted energy in it. I wanted things to feel human." The album was co-produced by Florrie alongside her longtime collaborators Brian Higgins and Ben Taylor.

"Ahh I am so excited for you to hear everything I've been working on for the last 12 months...I started writing this album while I was living alone in LA, and had a lot of time to myself to really think about what I wanted to say (maybe too much 😂) There are some songs on this record that I've wanted to write for years, and I’m just so incredibly proud of what we have created ❤️ [...] but for now, I want to say thank you for still being here and for your enthusiasm and excitement for new music over the last year while I've been a little studio hermit! It means so much to me."

— Florrie, announcing the album via Instagram.

== Promotion ==
The album was announced in June 2026, along with its release date and track listing, and was made available for pre-order. On 5 June 2026, Florrie released "The Times" as the album's lead single, accompanied by a music video. "Malibu (Falling Over the Edge)" was released on 3 July as the second single, followed by a remix by St. Lucia later that month. The third single, "Warrior" was released on 31 July. "Catch You If You Fall" was released on 28 August as the fourth single. The album's title track, "Magic for a While", was released on 25 September as the album fifth single.

== Track listing ==
Adapted from Apple Music.

Magic for a While track listing
No.	Title	Writer(s)	Length
1.	"The Times"	Florrie Arnold; Brian Higgins; Ben Taylor	4:04
2.	"Magic for a While"	Arnold; Higgins; Taylor; Calum Munro; Cameron Williams-Hill; Clara McHugh	3:39
3.	"Sofa"	Arnold; Higgins; Taylor	4:10
4.	"Warrior"	Arnold; Higgins; Taylor; Ian Curnow	4:55
5.	"Catch You If You Fall"	Arnold; Higgins; Taylor; McHugh	4:25
6.	"Late Night Running Through New York"	Arnold; Higgins; Taylor; Munro; Williams-Hill; McHugh	4:48
7.	"Spreadsheets"	Arnold; Higgins; Taylor; Munro; Williams-Hill	4:08
8.	"Annie"	Arnold; Higgins; Tyler Chester; Mike Viola	4:36
9.	"Malibu (Falling Over the Edge)"	Arnold; Higgins; Taylor; Jason Resch; Kris Ryeland	4:15
10.	"I Wanna Be in LA"	Arnold; Higgins; Taylor; Resch	3:57
11.	"Live in the Silence"	Arnold; Higgins; Taylor; Owen Parker; Toby Scott	4:28
12.	"Sad Eyes"	Arnold; Higgins; Chester; Viola	3:12
Total length:			50:37

The vinyl version contains 10 tracks, excluding "Late Night Running Through New York" and "I Wanna Be In LA".

== Personnel ==
Credits are adapted from Tidal.

=== Musicians ===
- Florrie Arnold – vocals, drums (all tracks); guitars, keyboards (tracks 1–7, 9–11)
- Ben Taylor – programming (all tracks), guitars (1, 2, 4, 6, 9, 11)
- Pablo Mir-Mir Arañó – background vocals
- Brian Higgins – programming
- Ramona Blue – background vocals (1–5, 8–11)
- Calum Munro – guitars (1–3, 5, 6, 8, 12)
- Rose Reymi – background vocals (1–3, 5, 8, 10)
- Cameron Williams-Hill – bass guitar, keyboards (1–3, 6)
- Shawn Lee – guitars (1, 3–6, 9–11)
- Jason Resch – guitars (1, 9–11), bass guitar (4, 11), programming (10)
- Niara Scarlett – background vocals (2, 5)
- Holly Murray – background vocals (3, 5–7, 9–11)
- Vanessa Rogers – background vocals (3, 5–7, 10, 11)
- Hattie Marsh – background vocals (3, 5, 7, 8, 11)
- Ian Curnow – keyboards (4–6)
- Sam Martin – keyboards (4, 11), piano (5)
- Luke Fitton – guitars (4)
- Fred Faulke – bass guitar (5)
- Tyler Chester – programming (8, 12), bass guitar (8); background vocals, piano (12)
- Mike Viola – guitars (8, 12), background vocals (12)
- Kris Ryeland – keyboards, programming (9)
- Owen Parker – keyboards (11)
- Toby Scott – programming (11)

=== Technical ===
- Ben Taylor – production, recording (all tracks); engineering (1–7, 9–11)
- Florrie Arnold – production
- Brian Higgins – production
- Tyler Chester – production (8, 12)
- Luca Ruscica – engineering (8, 12)
- Pablo Mir-Mir Arañó – recording assistance
- Jasper Trumflo – recording assistance (2, 6)
- Jason Resch – recording assistance (9, 10)
- Toby Scott – recording assistance (11)
- Manon Grandjean – mixing
- Emily Lazar – mastering
- Bob DeMaa – mastering assistance

== Charts ==
Chart performance for Magic for a While
Chart (2026)	Peak position
UK Album Downloads (Official Charts)	44
UK Independent Albums (Official Charts)	49
UK Independent Album Breakers (Official Charts)	5

== Release history ==
Magic for a While release history
Region	Date	Format(s)	Label	Ref.
Various	16 October 2026	CD; vinyl; digital download; streaming	Xenomania UK; BMG	
