= John Cordes Prioleau House =

House in Charleston, South Carolina, United States

Coordinates: 32.77536°N 79.93067°W

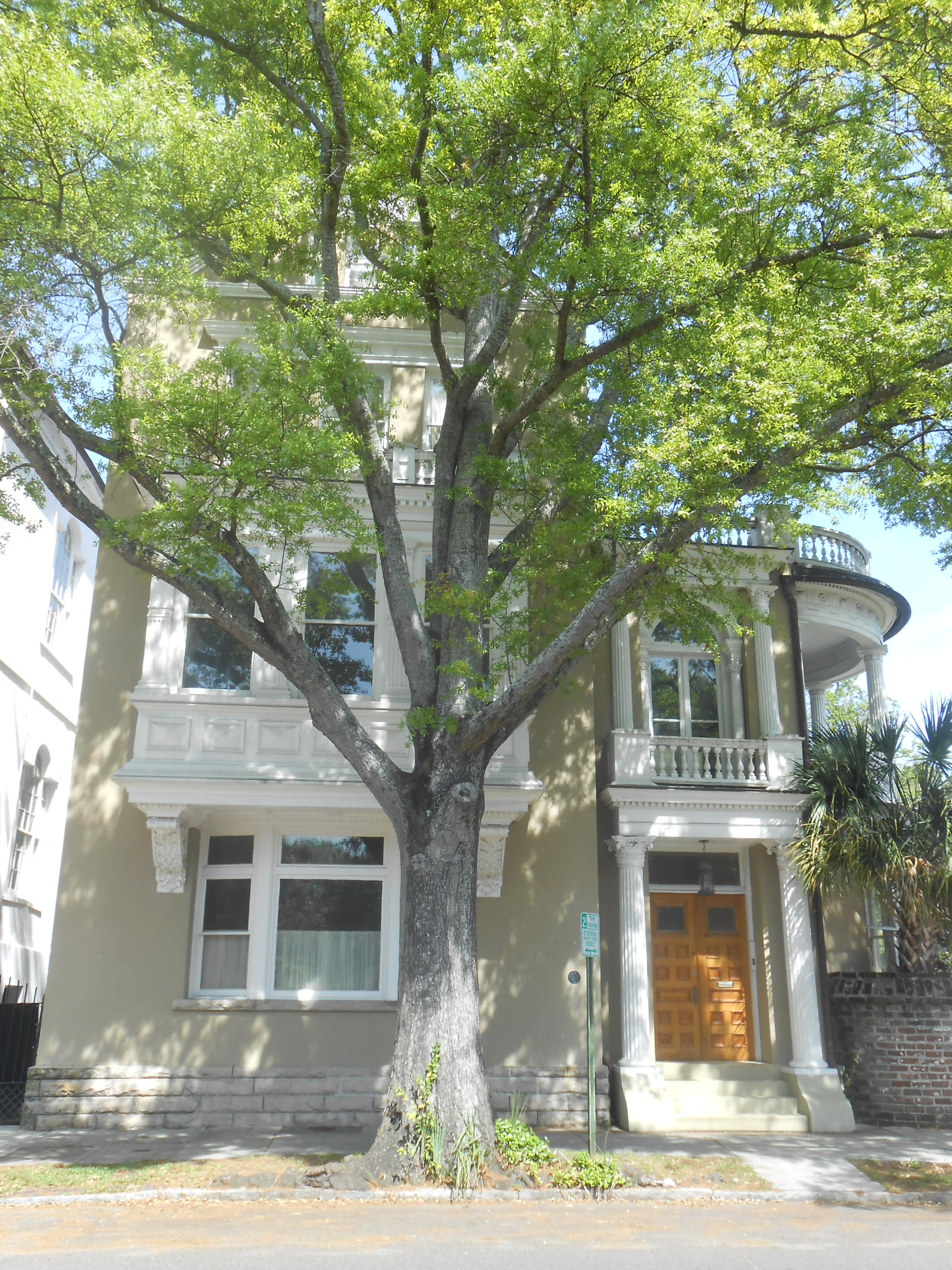
The John Cordes Prioleau House, 68 Meeting Street, Charleston, South Carolina

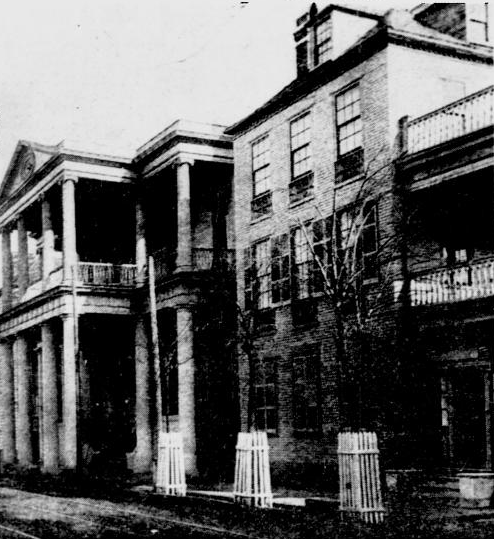
The John Cordes Prioleau House (right) was photographed in 1883 before being remodeled in the Victorian style in the 1890s.

The John Cordes Prioleau House is a historic residence in Charleston, South Carolina.

The house was built on property acquired in 1808 by John Cordes Prioleau from his father, the third generation of the Prioleau family to own the land. By 1816, Prioleau was living in his new house. In 1821, the property was expanded with the purchase of the adjacent lot to the south along Ropemaker Lane. In 1855, the house began being used as a school. In 1894, William Bachman Chisolm bought the house and made several alterations to it, bringing it up to the taste of the 1890s.

In 1949, the house was threatened with demolition to make way for a seven-story apartment house. The plans were vigorously opposed by locals, and the plans were rejected by both the city's zoning board and the Charleston City Council.

It remains privately owned.
