= The Lost Ones (album) =

Studio album by Florrie
- Released: 14 June 2024
- Recorded: 2018–2023
- Genres: Synth-pop; pop
- Length: 41:34
- Labels: Xenomania UK; BMG
- Producers: Brian Higgins; Florrie; Ben Taylor

Florrie chronology
Personal (2023)	The Lost Ones (2024)	Magic for a While (2026)

Singles from The Lost Ones
- 1. "The Lost Ones" Released: 22 March 2024; 2. "Kissing in the Cold" Released: 19 April 2024; 3. "Never Far from Paradise" Released: 17 May 2024; 4. "Looking for Love" Released: 14 June 2024

The Lost Ones is the debut studio album by English pop singer-songwriter, drummer, and model Florrie. It was released on 14 June 2024, through Xenomania UK Limited and BMG.

== Background ==
In July 2023, Florrie revealed in a Hunger Magazine interview that her upcoming debut album is titled The Lost Ones, and that it had "been in the making for five years". She also expressed her desire to "go on tour again"

In March 2024, along with the lead single release, the album was set for pre-order and the release date was announced, as well with the track listing.

"I have been waiting to make my debut album for the last 12 years and it deserved all the time and love I've put into it." – Florrie, talking about her debut album The Lost Ones.

== Track listing ==
The Lost Ones track listing
No.	Title	Writer(s)	Producer(s)	Length
1.	"The Lost Ones"	Florrie Arnold; Brian Higgins; Keir MacCulloch; Kyle Mackenzie; Clara McHugh; Owen Parker; Ben Taylor; Sarah Thompson; Sandy Wilhelm	Florrie Arnold; Brian Higgins; Ben Taylor	3:41
2.	"Never Far from Paradise"	Arnold; Higgins; MacCulloch; Mackenzie; McHugh; Parker; Jason Resch; Taylor; S. Thompson	Arnold; Higgins; Taylor	3:07
3.	"Kissing in the Cold"	Arnold; Pablo Mir-Mir Arañó; Higgins; MacCulloch; Mackenzie; McHugh; Parker; M. Kovacs; Taylor; Takura Tendayi	Arnold; Higgins; Taylor	3:54
4.	"Personal"	Arnold; Arañó; Jada Grinage; MacCulloch; Hattie Marsh; McHugh; Holly Murray; Vanessa Rogers	Arnold; Higgins; Taylor	3:25
5.	"Honeymoon's Over"	Arnold; Archie Campbell; Higgins; MacCulloch; Mackenzie; McHugh; Parker; Taylor	Arnold; Higgins; Taylor	3:02
6.	"Looking for Love"	Arnold; Tim Deal; Wayne Hector; Higgins; Parker; Taylor; Annie Yuill	Arnold; Higgins; Taylor	3:17
7.	"If It's Been a Hard Night"	Arnold; Higgins; Morgan Mackintosh; Grace Medford; Toby Scott; Taylor	Arnold; Higgins; Taylor	3:20
8.	"Bad Movie"	Arnold; MacCulloch; Mackenzie; McHugh; Medford; Parker; Taylor	Arnold; Higgins; Taylor	3:28
9.	"Love Hearts"	Arnold; Higgins; MacCulloch; Tiah Mason-Windett; Mackenzie; McHugh; Parker; Taylor	Arnold; Higgins; Taylor	3:19
10.	"I Took a Little Something" (2024 version)	Arnold; Miranda Cooper; Uzoechi Emenike; Frédérick Falke; Higgins; Keith Reid; Scott; Christopher Thompson	Arnold; Higgins	3:30
11.	"Get You Back"	Arnold; Deal; Higgins; Luke Fitton; Kieran Jones; Sam Martin; Resch; Scott	Arnold; Taylor	4:16
12.	"Jealous"	Arnold; Arañó; Higgins; McHugh; Parker; Rogers; Taylor; Tendayi; S. Thompson	Arnold; Higgins; Taylor	3:15
Total length:				41:34

Note

- "I Took a Little Something" was originally released on Florrie's second EP Experiments (2011); it has since been re-recorded for inclusion on the album.
- "Get You Back" is a re-recorded version of "I'm Gonna Get You Back", from her third EP Late (2012).

== Personnel ==
Musicians

- Florrie – lead vocals, keyboards (all tracks); drums (tracks 1, 2, 4, 6–9, 11), guitar (2, 3, 5, 6, 8, 9, 12), programming (10, 11)
- Holly Murray – backing vocals
- Vanessa Rogers – backing vocals
- Ben Taylor – programming (all tracks), keyboards (2, 4, 6, 8)
- Brian Higgins – programming (tracks 1–5, 7–12), keyboards (2, 4, 6, 8, 10)
- Sarah Thompson – backing vocals (tracks 1–5, 9, 12)
- Keir MacCulloch – programming (tracks 1–5, 9)
- Kyle Mackenzie – programming (tracks 1–5, 9)
- Hattie Marsh – backing vocals (tracks 1, 3–11)
- Jason Resch – guitar (tracks 1–3, 9, 11), keyboards (9)
- Owen Parker – guitar (tracks 1, 2, 4–6, 11), keyboards (2–6, 8, 9, 12), backing vocals (2, 3, 8)
- Jada Grinage – backing vocals (tracks 1, 3, 4, 8, 9, 12)
- Shawn Lee – guitar (tracks 1, 3, 5, 7)
- Pablo Mir-Mir Arañó – backing vocals (tracks 2–7, 9, 12)
- Stefan Storm – keyboards (track 2)
- Cameron Williams-Hill – guitar (tracks 4, 5, 7, 8)
- Ramona Blue – backing vocals (track 6)
- Rose Reymi – backing vocals (track 6)
- Luke Fitton – programming (track 6), guitar (11)
- Stefan Storm – programming (track 6)
- Tim Deal – programming (track 6)
- Frédérick Falke – bass guitar, keyboards (track 10)
- Toby Scott – keyboards (track 10)
- Annie Yuill – backing vocals (track 11)
- Marcus Bonfanti – guitar (track 11)

Technical

- Florrie – production
- Brian Higgins – production (tracks 1–10, 12)
- Ben Taylor – production (tracks 1–9, 11, 12)
- Dick Beetham – mastering
- Manon Grandjean – mixing (tracks 1–7)
- Ben Taylor – mixing (tracks 8–12), engineering (all tracks)
- Pablo Mir-Mir Arañó – engineering (tracks 3, 5, 12)
- Toby Scott – engineering (track 6)
- Xenomania – engineering (tracks 8, 9, 11, 12)
- Brian Higgins – engineering (track 11)

== Charts ==
Chart performance for The Lost Ones
Chart (2024)	Peak position
UK Album Downloads (OCC)	36
UK Independent Albums (OCC)	36
UK Independent Album Breakers (OCC)	9

== Release history ==
Release history and formats for The Lost Ones
Region	Date	Format	Label	Ref.
Various	14 June 2024	Digital download; streaming; CD; vinyl LP	Xenomania UK Limited; BMG	
