= Kris Menace =

German musician

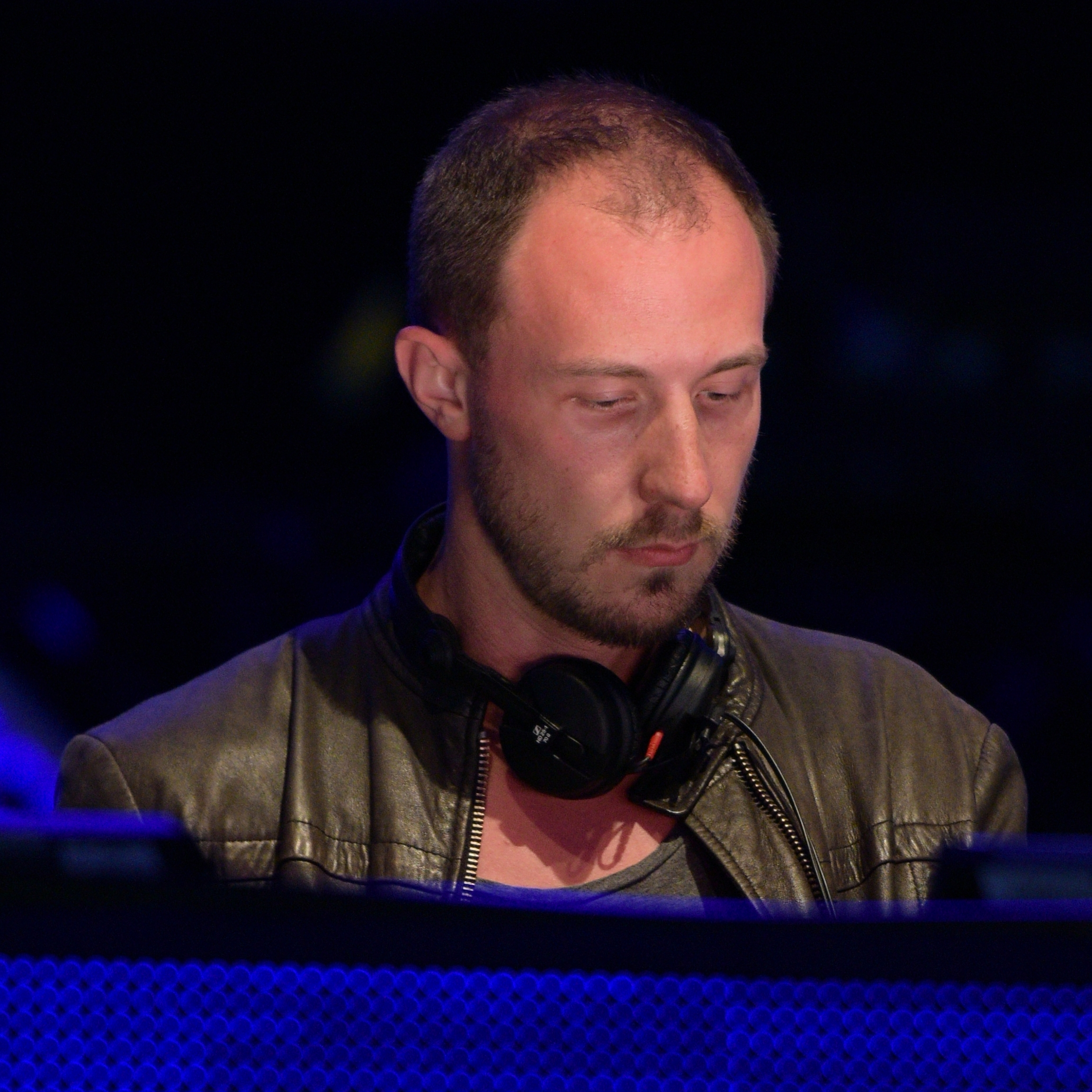
- Kris Menace at Mayday 2015

Background information
- Also known as: Black Van; Love on Laserdisc; Stars on 33; Cut Glass; Menace & Lord
- Born: Christoph Hoeffel; 1980 (age 45–46); Landau in der Pfalz, West Germany (now Germany)
- Genres: Nu-disco; progressive house
- Occupations: DJ; record producer; remixer
- Labels: Compuphonic; DFA; Size; PIAS; Work It Baby; Blood Music; Newstate; Kontor; Permanent Vacation; Defected; Vulture
- Website: krismenace.com

Kris Menace (born Christoph Hoeffel) is a German DJ, record producer, and remixer.

== History ==
Christophe Hoeffel began to work as a producer and writer in the mid-1990s for different projects and started using the pseudonym "Kris Menace" in 2005.

Menace's debut single "Discopolis" (in collaboration with his friend Lifelike) was released on Alan Braxe's label Vulture Music in 2005. "Discopolis" was later picked up by Defected Records and re-released with various remixes (such as that of Kerri Chandler) and a video directed by Seb Janiak. It became a huge hit in late 2006, reaching #10 in Finland and #89 in the UK Singles Chart.

Menace later formed his label Compuphonic and continued to release singles under its imprint. In 2006, Kris also started DJing with Alan Braxe, who was part of "Stardust" with Thomas Bangalter from Daft Punk, and together they released the single "Lumberjack" in June 2007 on Vulture Music. In 2008, he teamed up with the UK band Spooky to release the track "Stereophonic", as well as with Felix da Housecat to produce the house anthem "Artificial". and Rex the Dog to produce "POW!". His Kylie Minogue remix was featured on Kylie Minogue's Aphrodite special edition album. His remix of LCD Soundsystem's "North American Scum" became part of their album Sound of Silver in different territories such as Japan. His remix for Monarchy's "The Phoenix Alive" was used in the FIFA 12 video game soundtrack. In November 2010, Kris did a minimix on Annie Mac's Radio1 show and broke the record of number of used singles with 240 tracks played within five minutes.

From May 2009 to August 2010, Kris Menace had a weekly radio residency at Radio FG in Paris.

Kris Menace released his debut album Idiosyncrasies in May 2009 on three CDs, followed by the singles "Metropolis" and "Idiosyncrasy". Later, UK pop singer Emil resung the samples from "The Dream" and the song became released as "Walking on the Moon". It entered the US Billboard Hot Dance Chart at #8. In September 2010, Kris released his Masquerade EP on Steve Angello's SIZE Label, which was followed up by his "Phoenix & Triangle" release in January 2011 as well as "Alpha Omega" with acid house founder DJ Pierre.

Kris is also part of different projects and released under a number of aliases, including Cut Glass (with Maxwell Cooke), Stars on 33 (with Lawrence "LT" Thompson, Love on Laserdisc (with Ludovic Bordas), Jaunt and Black Van (DFA) and owns different record labels like Compuphonic or Work It Baby, where he nurtured artists such as Lifelike, Fred Falke and others.

The first release of his project Black Van, together with koweSix from Moonbootica, was released on LCD Soundsystem's DFA label and became nominated for the Nu-disco Track of the Year 2009 based on sales. "Black Van"'s follow up single "Moments of Excellence / The Calling (feat. Holy Ghost!)" was released in November 2010 on the label Permanent Vacation and "Inside", which entered the Hypem Charts at #1.

In November 2012, Kris released his album Features. The first single and video was "Hide", a collaboration with Miss Kittin that received a Vimeo Staff Pick. The video for the single "Lone Runner" was presented by MTV.com on 21 December 2012, followed by "Trusting Me" in February 2013, "Voodoo Dilate" in March and "Waiting for You" in April.

== Discography ==
=== Albums ===
- Idiosyncrasies (April 2009)
- Selected (April 2009) (iTunes Only)
- Idiosyncrasies (Special Edition) (April 2010)
- Electric Horizon (April 2012)
- Features (November 2012)
- Electric Horizon - Live In Barcelona (April 2013)
- The Entirety of Matter (November 2013)
- Sun, Moon & Stars (January 2014) (as Menace and Lord)

=== Singles ===
- Lifelike & Kris Menace – "Discopolis" (Vulture / 2005)
- Kris Menace – "Voyage" (Compuphonic / 2005)
- Lifelike & Kris Menace – "Discopolis (Remixes)" (Vulture / Defected / 2006)
- Kris Menace – "Jupiter" (Compuphonic / 2006)
- Kris Menace feat. Fred Falke – "Fairlight" (Compuphonic / 2007)
- Alan Braxe & Kris Menace – "Lumberjack" (Vulture / 2007)
- Kris Menace – "Steamroller" (Compuphonic / 2008)
- Kris Menace & Spooky – "Stereophonic" (Compuphonic / 2008)
- Kris Menace & Felix da Housecat – "Artificial" (Compuphonic /2008)
- Kris Menace – "Scaler" (Compuphonic / 2009)
- Black Van – "Yearning" (DFA / 2010)
- Kris Menace & Douze – "Lockhead" (Masquerede EP) (Size / 2010)
- Kris Menace – "Swarm" (Masquerade EP) (Size / 2010)
- Menace – "Hz vs Tones" (Blood Music / 2010)
- Kris Menace – "Walking on the Moon" (U-Tern Bootleg)" (2010)
- Kris Menace – "Phoenix / Triangle" (Phoenix EP) (Size / 2010)
- Black Van – "Moments of Excellence" (Permanent Vacation / 2011)
- Black Van – "Moments of Excellence vs. Holy Ghost!" (Permanent Vacation / 2011)
- Kris Menace & DJ Pierre – "Crank" (Different / Pias 2011)
- Menace & Tracid – "Buchla 200e" (Compuphonic / 2011)
- Rex the Dog & Kris Menace – "POW!" (Compuphonic / 2011)
- Adam Shaw & Kris Menace – "Starchild EP" (Compuphonic / 2011)
- Kris Menace – eLove EP (4 tracks) (Compuphonic / 2011)
- Kris Menace & Douze – "Hexo / Overflow" (Compuphonic / 2011)
- Stars on 33 – "Let the Music Guide You EP" (5 tracks) (Eskimo / 2011)
- Kris Menace – "Falling Star" (Compuphonic / 2012)
- Kris Menace – "eFeel" (Compuphonic / 2012)
- The Kiki Twins & Kris Menace – "We Are" (Compuphonic / 2012)
- Black Van – "Inside" (Excellent Music / 2012)
- Kris Menace feat. Miss Kittin – "Hide" (Remixes) (Compuphonic / 2012)
- Kris Menace feat. Unai – "Lone Runner" (Remixes) (Compuphonic / 2012)
- Kris Menace feat. Robert Owens – "Trusting Me" (Remixes) (Compuphonic / 2013)
- Kris Menace feat. Chelonis R. Jones – "Voodoo Dilate" (SAMO)" (Remixes) (Compuphonic / 2013)
- Kris Menace feat. Romanthony – "2Nite4U" (Compuphonic / 2013)
- Kris Menace feat. Black Hills – "Waiting for You" (Remixes) (Compuphonic / Ego Music Italy / 2013)
- Kris Menace & Lifelike – "Ready 4 Love" (Computer Science / 2015)
- Kris Menace & Lifelike – "Ecstasy" (Spinnin' / 2016)
- Kris Menace & Lifelike – "What Time Is Love" (Spinnin' / 2016)
- Kris Menace & Simon Lord – "Feel Alive" (Better Music / 2016)
