= Dijon Prioleau =

American singer

- Born: December 19, 1992 (age 33); Columbia, South Carolina, United States
- Genres: Gospel, R&B
- Occupation: Singer
- Instrument: Vocal
- Years active: 2007-Present
- Label: Kollosul Entertainment/Zomba Gospel
- Website: www.myspace.com/theofficialdijon

Dijon Prioleau (born December 19, 1992), known as Dijon, is an American gospel singer.

== Personal life ==
Dijon was born in Columbia, South Carolina, to Kim Cohen and Daryl Prioleau. He has four siblings: Adonia Prioleau, Kimberly Adams, Jalen Clouds, Jaron Prioleau and one stepbrother: DequinDre Adams by his stepmother: Kiesha Prioleau. His biological parents divorced when Dijon was at a very young age. Dijon attended Fairfield Middle School in Winnsboro, South Carolina. He was 14 years old when he was discovered by Todd (Boogie) Muhammad after an audition in Columbia, South Carolina, and he was later signed to Kollosul Entertainment/Zomba Gospel. On August 7, 2007 he released his first album "A Kid's Point of View".

== Discography ==
=== Albums ===
- A Kid's Point of View (2007)
  - Christian Book link
  - Amazon link

=== Singles ===
- "A Kid's Point of View"
- "He Is Lord"
- "Real Love (Dijon song)"

== Reviews ==
- SoulTracks review of From a Kids Point of View
- Gospel Flava Album Review
