= Too Young to Remember =

Single by Florrie
- Released: 6 March 2015
- Genre: Indie pop
- Length: 3:51
- Label: Sony Music
- Songwriters: Florence Arnold; Krystal Buckley; Femi Falola; Wayne Hector; Samuel Martin; Uzoechi Emenike; Brian Higgins; Miranda Cooper; Carla Marie Williams; Toby Scott; Paul Harris; Nathan Cross
- Producers: Higgins; Xenomania

Florrie singles chronology
"Little White Lies" (2014)	"Too Young to Remember" (2015)	"Real Love" (2016)

"Too Young to Remember" is a song performed by British singer and songwriter Florrie. It was written by Florrie, Miranda Cooper, Brian Higgins, Toby Scott, Paul Harris, Wayne Hector, and Uzo Emenike, and released on 6 March 2015 through Sony Music on iTunes. A remix EP for the song was released on the same day, including one made by Florrie herself.

== Background and release ==
On 3 July 2014 Florrie released her single "Little White Lies". In early 2015, the singer announced a follow-up single to "Little White Lies", which would be entitled "Too Young to Remember", and released in March 2015. The song was released on iTunes on 6 March, along with its remix EP, which included one made by Florrie herself. Previous to the single's release, in late 2014, an album sampler of Florrie's debut album began circulating on the web, which included "Too Young to Remember", "Turn the World Upside Down", "Galaxies", "Looking for Love In the Wrong Place", "Little White Lies" and the 2013 single "Live a Little". However, the album was ultimately shelved, and the unreleased tracks remained the same way, without future plans to be published. An acoustic version of the song was posted at Florrie's official YouTube account on 13 March 2015.

== Composition ==
"Too Young to Remember" lasts for three minutes and fifty-one seconds, running at a moderate tempo of 98 beats per minute, set at 4/4 time signature. The instrumentation incorporates drums, claps and guitars, and the chorus is sung by Florrie and several background voices. The lyrics are based on throwbacks to 1991 and 1989, and include references to different moments like the Fall of the Berlin Wall, Super Mario and the Batman movie Batman: The Return of the Joker.

== Music video ==
The music video for the song was released on 26 January 2015 to Florrie's official YouTube account. It features Florrie singing and drumming, along with other people having fun. The background is fulfilled with pastel colors.

== Track listing ==
=== Digital download ===
1. "Too Young to Remember" — 3:51

=== Remix bundle ===
1. "Too Young to Remember" (Florrie Remix) — 4:04
2. "Too Young to Remember" (Seamus Haji Remix) — 6:09
3. "Too Young to Remember" (Rich B & Phil Marriott Remix) — 5:16
