= A Kid's Point of View =

Studio album by Dijon
- Released: August 7, 2007
- Recorded: 2007
- Genres: R&B, gospel
- Length: 41:57
- Label: Kollosul Entertainment/Zomba Gospel
- Producers: Todd Muhammad, Troy Taylor, Larry Campbell, Asaph A. Ward

A Kid's Point of View is the first studio album by American singer Dijon Prioleau, released August 7, 2007. Reviews for the album have been mixed with SoulTracks rating the album as "mildly recommended" while GospelFlava.com says it is "real, genuine, a great listen."

== Track listing ==
No.	Title	Writer(s)	Length
1.	"A Kid's Point of View"	Todd Muhammad; Troy Taylor	3:42
2.	"He Is Lord"	Muhammad; Larry Campbell	3:41
3.	"Worthy Lamb"	Asaph A. Ward	4:34
4.	"Real Love"	Ward	3:44
5.	"My Potential"	Muhammad; Campbell	3:40
6.	"Give Praise"	Ward	4:15
7.	"I Wanna Be More Like Him"	Muhammad; Campbell	3:19
8.	"Pressures"	Ward	3:38
9.	"I Know Better"	Muhammad; Campbell	3:46
10.	"Jesus Will Know"	Muhammad; Campbell	3:48
11.	"How Great Is Our God"	Ward	3:46
