= Real Love (Florrie song) =

Single by Florrie
- Released: February 5, 2016
- Genre: Pop; Electropop
- Length: 3:47
- Label: Sony Music
- Composer(s): Florrie Arnold; Johan Alkenäs; Trey Campbell; Joacim Persson; Britt Burton
- Lyricist(s): Florrie Arnold; Johan Alkenäs; Trey Campbell; Joacim Persson; Britt Burton
- Producer(s): Joacim Persson

Florrie singles chronology
| "Too Young to Remember" (2015) | "Real Love" (2016) | "Borderline" (2019) |

Music video
- "Real Love" on YouTube

"Real Love" is a song by English singer-songwriter, drummer and model, Florrie. It was first released on February 5, 2016, and subsequently issued as an official single on March 25 through Sony Music Entertainment.

== Background and release ==
"Real Love" is a pop song written by Florrie, alongside Johan Alkenäs, Trey Campbell, Brittany Marie Burton, and Joacim Persson, the latter of whom also produced the track, in Los Angeles. The song was originally intended to serve as the lead single from Florrie’s debut studio album under Sony Music; however, the album was ultimately shelved following the end of her professional relationship with the label. In 2024, Florrie revealed that Sony had issued an ultimatum regarding the release, stating: "If your next single (Real Love) isn't a hit, then you'll be dropped."

In an interview with Composure, Florrie was asked about the meaning behind "Real Love" and what she hoped listeners would take away from the song:

"It’s about getting into a new relationship with someone, and it’s the early stages when there are so many questions running through your head. You’re completely infatuated with that person, but you question whether it’s real because you know that you’re going slightly mad at the same time! I just want people to love listening to the record, and I hope that people can relate to it in their own way. And I’m pretty certain that real love is a different thing to each and every one of us!"

— Florrie explaining "Real Love", to Composure Magazine

The song and its accompanying music video premiered on February 4, 2016, via The 405 Pop, and were officially released the following day.

== Promotion ==
To support the promotion of "Real Love," two official remixes were released on April 18. The first one was a remix by British record producer, As I Am. The second remix was a radio mix by the house duo Cahill.

An acoustic live session of "Real Love" was uploaded by Florrie to her official YouTube channel on March 18.

== Music video ==
A music video directed by Emil Nava was released alongside the song and received unanimous critical acclaim. Critics praised its cinematography, visual styling, fashion elements, and the creative collaboration between Nava and Florrie.

Notable for its 16mm cinematography and vintage Hollywood-inspired visuals, the video presents its narrative through the point of view of Florrie’s on-screen boyfriend's camera; which documents the course of their relationship. Set against the backdrop of an Art Deco-style interior, the video has drawn comparisons from critics to the cinematic style of Wes Anderson. Mandy Rogers of EQ Music praised the music video, highlighting Florrie’s use of a "vintage wardrobe of garments and styling them out like a trooper", and the video "good feel good vibe" as some of its most appealing aspects. Jenesaispop described the video as an ode to the artist’s beauty, while also successfully highlighting the pop character of the song. Similarly, Doron Davidson-Vidavski of The 405 Pop wrote described the video as a short but impactful display of Florrie’s musical strengths, enhanced by its bold and visually compelling imagery. He also praised her distinctive on-screen presence, noting that "the camera simply loves her".

Speaking to Fame Magazine about their first-time collaboration, the artists expressed enthusiasm for working together.

“I’d wanted to work with Emil for a long time, and was a big fan of his work, even before I met him. I think its Emil’s energy that I love the most, and it made such a HUGE difference on set. His enthusiasm and love for what he does really got the best possible performance out of me and I trusted him 100%, which is the best feeling because you can totally relax and have fun with it. I genuinely can’t imagine ever making a video with anyone else now!! I feel very proud of it.”

— Florrie on working with Nava, to Fame Magazine

Director Emil Nava described the collaboration with Florrie as a highly rewarding experience, calling it "a true pleasure." He noted that while the concept involved some creative risk, Florrie "absolutely nailed it." Nava also highlighted the ambitious wardrobe changes, stating that they used more outfits than he had ever done on a video shoot, crediting Florrie’s commitment and enthusiasm for making it possible.

“Working with Florrie on the video was a true pleasure. The collaboration process on this video was amazing. From the concept, to the look, to all the fashion I loved it. It was amazing to shoot this video on 16mm film and create such a stand out look. The concept was a bit risky and Florrie absolutely nailed it. We did more outfits than I have ever done and that comes down to Florrie being such a trooper and absolutely going for it. I can’t wait for the world to see it. Real Love for this one.”

— Emil Nava on working with Florrie, to Fame Magazine

A second music video was released on Valentine's Day, featuring homemade clips submitted by fans of Florrie enjoying the song.

== Critical reception ==
"Real Love" was met with critical acclaim, with reviewers highlighting its production, infectious hook, and Florrie’s performance; numerous critics subsequently featured the track in their year-end best-of lists.

Sarah Yoo of Composure Magazine, wrote that Florrie and the song presents a "new flavor of electronica pop, a bold and dreamy sound that brings us into the next irresistible age of pop music." A Bit of Pop Music described the song as a "perfectly crafted pop tune with beautiful melodic verses, an exquisite production and a more than infectious chorus", stating that "if there is any justice in the pop world", that (song) will get Florrie into her major break-through. A Bit of Pop Music went further stating that "Real Love" is the kind of pop tune that actually deserves a spot on the playlists of British radio, and the international stations for that matter."

Fame Magazine called the song a "charming tune", stating that "Real Love" is "another pearl of Florrie's unique blend of refreshing pop." Graham Porter of Your Music Radar predicted that the song could be the one to help Florrie "finally crack the market," as he has "always felt that she has never quite gotten the adulation she deserves." Fashion Soundtrack acclaimed the track, stating that they "love the song for its boldness", as well for its "imaginative" concept. They also highlighted "Real Love" as their "Track of the Day", calling it "One for the pop lovers". The music website Jenesaispop complimented the music video for "Real Love," stating that it was "aptly orchestrated to emphasize the song's pop character." Then, on March 7, 2016, the website listed the track as one of the best songs of the year so far. Mandy Rogers of EQ Music expressed mixed feelings about the track, while stating that she enjoyed the song, calling it "pleasantly dizzying enough in an Ellie Goulding kind of way", she felt that was "expecting something of more biting impact" compared to the singer previous work.

Alexandra Pollard of Gigwise, dubbed it "an exquisitely-crafted, bombastic pop anthem, with a bridge even catchier than its chorus." Writing for Billboard, Jason Lipshutz named "Real Love" one of the 20 "sadly underrated pop songs of 2016," highlighting that while "Florrie’s best song isn’t derivative", it would still be enjoyable even if it were, given its appeal. Michael John Ciszewski, writing for Medium, described the song as a 'pop bliss' and ranked it among his Top 100 Songs of 2016. Additionally, MuuMuse ranked "Real Love" as the 38th best single of 2016. United by Pop also listed it as the 49th best banger of 2016, praising its hook.

Critics' year-end lists of "Real Love"
| Publisher | Year | Listicle | Rank | Ref. |
|---|---|---|---|---|
| Billboard | 2016 | 20 Sadly Underrated Pop Songs From 2016 | Listed | |
| Medium | 2016 | Top 100 Songs of 2016: Staff Pick | 97 | |
| MuuMuse | 2016 | The Top 100 Singles of 2016 | 38 | |
| United by Pop | 2016 | Top 50 Roundup of The Best Bangers of 2016 | 49 | |

== Track listing ==
- Digital download and streaming — Single
1. "Real Love" — 3:47
- Digital download and streaming – As I Am Remix — Single
1. "Real Love" (As I Am Remix) — 5:44
- Digital download and streaming – Cahill Radio Mix — Single
1. "Real Love" (Cahill Radio Mix) — 3:27

== Personnel ==
Credits adapted from Apple Music.

- Florrie Arnold — vocals, composer, lyrics
- Johan Alkenäs — composer, lyrics
- Trey Campbell — composer, lyrics
- Joacim Persson — composer, lyrics, producer
- Britt Burton — composer, lyrics
- Serban Ghenea — mixing
- John Hanes — audio engineer
- Chris Gehringer — mastering

== Release history ==
Release dates and formats for "Real Love"
| Region | Date | Format | Label | Version | Ref. |
|---|---|---|---|---|---|
| Various | 5 February 2016 | Digital download; streaming | Sony Music Entertainment UK | Original | |
| Various | 18 March 2016 | Digital download; streaming | Sony Music Entertainment UK | As I Am Remix | |
| Various | 18 March 2016 | Digital download; streaming | Sony Music Entertainment UK | Cahill Radio Mix | |
