= Fred Falke =

French house/dance music producer and DJ

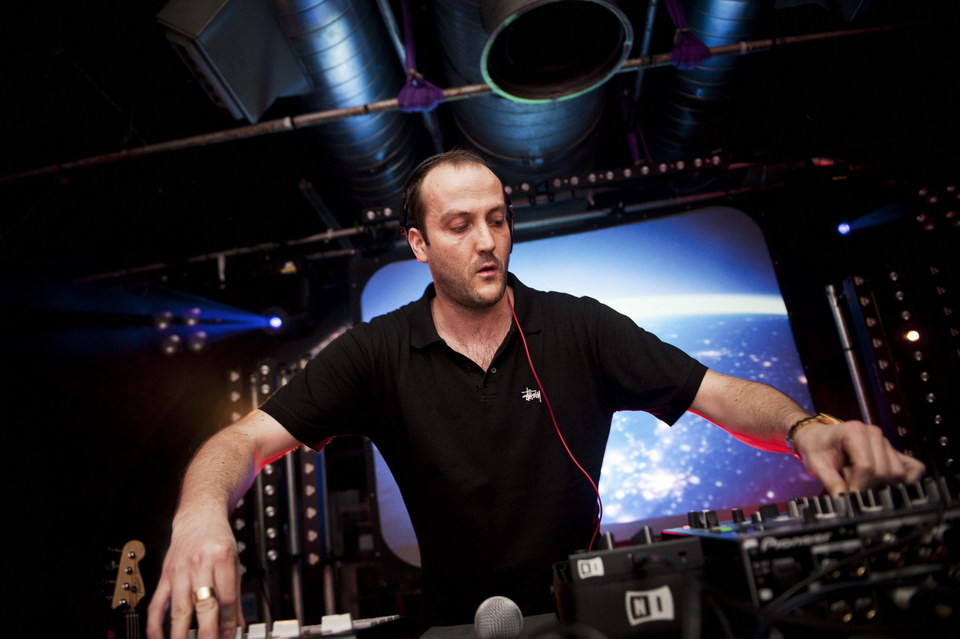
- Falke performing at The Arches, 2012

Background information
- Origin: France
- Genres: French house, electropop
- Occupations: Producer, DJ
- Years active: 2000–present
- Labels: Vulture, Work It Baby, Kitsuné, Universal, Mercury
- Website: fredfalke.com

Frédérick Falke (French pronunciation: [fʁedeʁik falk]; born 7 January 1973) is a French house and dance music producer and DJ.

== Biography ==
Falke started out as a bass player before moving to production work. His first record, a collaboration with Alan Braxe named Intro, which sampled The Jets' 1987 hit "Crush on You", was released in 2000 on Vulture Music.

The pair would form a partnership releasing a handful of singles and later making remixes for artists such as Goldfrapp, Röyksopp, Kelis, and Justice. The partnership would last until 2008 when they went their separate ways.

Falke has also collaborated with German producer and DJ Kris Menace, as well as releasing records on Menace's label Work It Baby. In addition, he has collaborated on various other productions with artists such as Savage, Miami Horror and Knightlife.

By himself, Falke has written and worked with Ellie Goulding, Amelia Lily, Florrie, Will Young, Gossip, Theophilus London, Nervo and Alexandra Burke. As a remixer, he has also worked for a number of rock and electronic artists such as Gossip, U2, Tiesto, Foxes, Grizzly Bear, Nero, Robyn, Uffie, Justice, Jamiroquai, Ladyhawke, Eric Prydz, Lykke Li, La Roux, Kesha, Bastille and Selena Gomez. Falke has done four official remixes with Jamiroquai: two as an individual, and two with Alan Braxe. Falke has also made many remixes with Xenomania.

Since 2021 Fred has been one half of Ampersounds, a collaboration with L.A. based Brit, Zen Freeman. In 2025, Ampersounds signed to Big Top Records Amsterdam and have released tracks in collaboration with Owl Eyes, Steve Edwards and Toro Y Moi. Their debut album Generation is due for release in October 2025.

In January 2026, Falke reunited with Alan Braxe to celebrate the 25th anniversary of their debut single "Intro." The milestone was marked by the release of the Intro (25th Anniversary) EP on 20 March 2026 via Smugglers Way. The package featured a cosmic dub remix by Falke and a "Hotel Room Edit" by Braxe. This followed the 2024 inclusion of "Intro" in the Paris Olympic Opening Ceremony and a tribute to the duo's production style by Justice on their album Hyperdrama.

== Discography ==
=== Albums ===
- Part IV (5 December 2011)

=== Singles, EPs and collaborations ===
Year	Artist	Title
2000	Alan Braxe and Fred Falke	Running
2002	Alan Braxe and Fred Falke	Palladium/Penthouse Serenade
2003	Alan Braxe and Fred Falke	Love Lost
2004	Alan Braxe and Fred Falke	Rubicon
2005	Alan Braxe, Fred Falke, and Géraud Lafarge (as Defender)	Defender/Bliss
2006	Kris Menace feat. Fred Falke	Fairlight
2006	Fred Falke w/ Géraud Lafarge (as Savage)	Omega Man/Wait for Love
2008	Kris Menace starring Felix Da Housecat feat. Fred Falke	Artificial
2008	Fred Falke	Music for My Friends
2009	Fred Falke feat. Teff Balmert	Chicago
2009	Géraud Lafarge (as Savage) feat. Fred Falke	Muzak EP
2009	Alan Braxe and Fred Falke feat. Géraud Lafarge (as Savage)	You'll Stay In My Heart
2009	Morjac and Fred Falke feat. Sarah Tyler	When We're Together
2010	Burns and Fred Falke	Y.S.L.M. (You Stopped Loving Me)
2010	Fred Falke	When I Look Into Your Eyes
2012	The Knocks and Fred Falke	Geronimo
2014	Tiësto, Ellen Lea and Fred Falke	Calling on Angels
2015	Fred Falke	Radio Days (feat. "Shotgun" Tom Kelly)
2015	Fred Falke	Alpha EP
2016	Fred Falke	It's A Memory (feat. Elohim & Mansions On The Moon)
2019	Fred Falke and Zen Freeman	Watch The Sun

=== As producer and writer ===
Year	Artist	Title
2009	Sarah Harding	Too Bad
2010	Ellie Goulding	Home
2010	Ellie Goulding	Believe Me
2010	Florrie	Left Too Late
2011	Florrie	Begging Me
2011	Florrie	Took A Little Something
2011	Will Young	Circles
2012	Alexandra Burke	Love You That Much
2012	Amelia Lily	You Bring Me Joy
2012	Theophilus London	Lisa
2012	Florrie	Call 911
2012	Gossip	Move in the Right Direction
2014	Eden xo	Too Cool To Dance
2014	Various Artists	Vandroid
2015	Nervo	The Other Boys
2017	Pompeya	Domino

=== Remixes ===
Year	Artist	Title
2004	Menace & Adam	Missile Test
2006	Bodyrox feat. Luciana	Yeah Yeah
2007	Eskimo Disco	What Is Woman?
2007	Eskimo Disco	Japanese Girl
2008	Hot Chip	Colours
2008	Digitalism	Apollo-Gize
2008	The Whitest Boy Alive	Golden Cage
2008	The Energies	Born Again Runner
2008	Pnau	Embrace (co-produced with Miami Horror)
2008	Filthy Dukes	This Rhythm
2008	Kish Mauve	Lose Control
2008	Roland Clark	Music Talking
2008	Roy Davis Jr.	I Have A Vision
2008	VHS or BETA	Burn it All Down
2008	Eric Prydz	Pjanoo
2008	Citylife	San Francisco
2008	Sneaky Sound System	I Love It
2008	Sugababes	Girls
2008	Alesha Dixon	The Boy Does Nothing
2008	Will Young	Grace
2008	Ladyhawke	Back of the Van
2008	Lykke Li	I'm Good, I'm Gone
2009	Candice Alley	Falling
2009	Grizzly Bear	Two Weeks
2009	Just Jack	Doctor Doctor
2009	All Thieves	Only Of You
2009	Gossip	Heavy Cross
2009	U2	Magnificent
2009	Annie	Anthonio
2009	Little Boots	New in Town
2009	Will Young	Tell Me The Worst
2009	La Roux	Bulletproof
2009	Mini Viva	Left My Heart in Tokyo
2009	Robbie Williams	Bodies
2009	Example	Watch the Sun Come Up
2009	Miike Snow	Animal
2009	Burns	First Move
2009	Kesha	TiK ToK
2009	Music Go Music	Warm in the Shadows
2009	Miami Horror	Make You Mine
2009	OneRepublic	All The Right Moves
2010	Hurts	Unspoken
2010	Florrie	Call 911
2010	Florrie	Panic Attack
2010	Sia	Clap Your Hands
2010	Shena	Nasty Little Rumour
2010	Lifehouse	Halfway Gone
2010	Robyn	Dancing on My Own
2010	Florrie	Fascinate Me
2010	Hannah	I Believe In You
2010	Dido	Everything to Lose
2010	Kele	Everything You Wanted
2010	The Playin' Stars	You Needed Me (feat. Romanthony)
2010	Bryan Ferry	You Can Dance
2010	Marina and the Diamonds	Shampain
2010	Zero 7	Destiny
2010	Jamiroquai	Blue Skies
2010	Katy Perry	Firework
2010	Ke$ha	We R Who We R
2010	James Blunt	Stay the Night
2011	Vandroid	Master & Slave
2011	Metronomy	The Look
2011	Nicole Scherzinger	Don't Hold Your Breath
2011	Uffie	Illusion of Love (Feat. Mattie Safer)
2011	Wolf Gang	The King And All Of His Men
2011	Darren Hayes	Talk Talk Talk
2011	Axel Le Baron & Kurbatov	Fame
2011	The Knocks	Brightside
2011	Nero	Reaching Out
2011	Skylar Grey	Invisible
2012	Ricki-Lee	Do It Like That
2012	Dirty Vegas	Emma
2012	Theophilus London	Love Is Real
2012	Eva Simons	I Don't Like You
2012	Jimmy Somerville	Taken Away
2012	Lana Del Rey	National Anthem
2012	Lenny Kravitz	Superlove
2012	Taryn Manning	Send Me Your Love
2012	Owl City & Carly Rae Jepsen	Good Time
2012	P!nk	Blow Me (One Last Kiss)
2012	Atlas Genius	Trojans
2012	Kat Graham	Wanna Say
2012	Two Door Cinema Club	Sun
2012	Girls Aloud	Something New
2012	OneRepublic	Feel Again
2013	Nervo	Hold On
2013	Selena Gomez	Come & Get It
2013	Jason Derulo	The Other Side
2013	Lindstrom	Vos-sako-rv
2013	Patterns	Sunny Days
2014	Pompeya	90
2014	Foxes	Let Go for Tonight
2014	Tiesto	Red Lights
2014	Rebecca & Fiona	Holler
2014	Mystery Skulls	Ghost
2014	Bastille	Bad Blood
2014	FM Laeti	Wanna Dance
2014	Sirens Of Lesbos	Long Days, Hot Nights
2014	Krishane	Drunk and Incapable (feat. Melissa Steel & Beenie Man)
2014	Ella Eyre	Comeback
2014	Indiana	Only The Lonely
2015	Prides	Higher Love
2015	Nathan Sykes	Kiss Me Quick
2015	Will Young	Thank You
2015	Chordashian	Skyscraper Souls (feat. Freedom Fry)
2015	Frida	I Know There's Something Going On
2016	Rome Fortune	Dance
2016	Gregory Porter	Don't Lose Your Stream
2016	Midnight Faces	Heavenly Bodies
2016	Jake Bugg	Bitter Salt
2017	Jamiroquai	Cloud 9
2017	Jorge Blanco	Summer Soul
2017	Miley Cyrus	Younger Now
2018	Synapson	Hide Away
2018	Pete Yorn, Scarlett Johansson	Bad Dreams
2018	Calum Scott	No Matter What
2019	Møme	Sail Away
2019	Yann Dulché	Paradisco
2019	Funk LeBlanc	Real Love (feat. Holland Greco)
2021	Sheila	Little Darlin' 40Th
2022	Roosevelt	Passion (feat. Nile Rodgers)
2022	Claude François	Magnolias for Ever
2024	The Corrs	Breathless
2025	The Whitest Boy Alive	Golden Cage
2025	Vandroid (soundtrack)	It's a Fantasy

=== Remixes with Alan Braxe ===
Year	Artist	Title
2005	Death from Above 1979	Black History Month
2005	Goldfrapp	Number 1
2005	Röyksopp	Only This Moment
2006	Kelis	Bossy
2006	Van She	Kelly
2006	Infadels	Girl That Speaks No Words
2006	Keith	Mona Lisa's Child
2006	Jamiroquai	Runaway
2006	Test Icicles	What's Your Damage?
2007	Jamiroquai	Alright
2007	Justice	D.A.N.C.E
2007	Dragonette	Take It Like a Man
