= Xenomania production discography =

The following is a discography of UK pop production house Xenomania, put together by songwriter and record producer Brian Higgins. Members of the Xenomania writing and production team include Nick Coler, Giselle Sommerville, Niara Scarlett, Miranda Cooper (who shares co-writing credits in nearly all Xenomania-written tracks), Lisa Cowling, Tim Powell, and Matt Gray. In the turn of the decade, the team also welcomed members Carla Marie Williams, Toby Scott, Timothy "Hight" Deal, Florrie, Luke Fitton and Ben Taylor and Sarah Thompson. Xenomania also have their own in-house DJ and remixer, Tony Lamezma. They did have a second, Gravitas, but there has been no commercially released Gravitas remixes since 2005, the last one of these a remix of "Wake Me Up" by Girls Aloud.

== International singles and certifications ==
=== 1990s ===
List of written or produced contributions that were made singles, with year released, artist(s) involved, selected chart positions, certifications and album name. This can include songs in which members have contributed to individually with others, away from the Xenomania name. All songs are in order of initial release, which may coincide with an album release.
Title	Year	Peak chart positions										Certifications	Album
Title	Year	UK	AUS	BEL (FL)	NOR	GER	NL	NZ	SWI	SWE	US	Certifications	Album
"All I Wanna Do" (Dannii Minogue)	1997	4	11	20	—	—	—	—	—	48	—	ARIA: Gold	Girl
"Believe" (Cher)	1998	1	1	1	1	1	1	1	1	1	1	BPI: x3 Platinum; ARIA: x3 Platinum; RMNZ: Gold; RIAA: Platinum; BVMI: x5 Gold; NVPI: Platinum; IFPI NOR: x2 Platinum; BEA: x3 Platinum; GLF: x3 Platinum; IFPI DEN: Gold	Believe

=== 2000s ===
Title	Year	Peak chart positions										Certifications	Album
Title	Year	UK	AUS	BEL (FL)	NOR	GER	NL	NZ	SWI	SWE	US	Certifications	Album
"Action" (Saint Etienne)	2002	41	68	—	—	—	—	—	—	—	—		Finisterre
"Round Round" (Sugababes)	2002	1	13	16	4	15	8	2	4	11	—	BPI: Silver; ARIA: Gold	Angels with Dirty Faces
"Angels with Dirty Faces" (Sugababes)	2002	7	34	—	—	—	—	24	—	—	—		Angels with Dirty Faces
"Sound of the Underground" (Girls Aloud)	2002	1	31	13	—	42	10	—	25	39	—	BPI: Platinum	Sound of the Underground
"Love on the Run" (Chicane featuring Peter Cunnah)	2003	33	50	—	—	38	85	—	—	—	—		Non-album single
"No Good Advice" (Girls Aloud)	2003	2	88	45	—	—	23	—	—	—	—		Sound of the Underground
"Life Got Cold" (Girls Aloud)	2003	3	—	14	—	—	—	—	—	—	—		Sound of the Underground
"Jump" (Girls Aloud)	2003	2	23	6	—	—	11	13	58	9	—	BPI: Silver	Sound of the Underground
"Do Me Wrong" (Mel Blatt)	2003	18	—	—	—	28	—	—	—	—	—		Non-album single
"Miss Perfect" (Abz Love featuring Nodesha)	2003	5	—	—	—	—	—	—	—	—	—		Abstract Theory
"Hole in the Head" (Sugababes)	2003	1	25	20	2	9	3	11	8	7	96	BPI: Silver	Three
"In the Middle" (Sugababes)	2003	8	33	40	—	29	20	—	23	—	—		Three
"The Show" (Girls Aloud)	2004	2	67	—	—	—	—	—	—	—	—		What Will the Neighbours Say?
"Love Machine" (Girls Aloud)	2004	2	—	—	—	—	52	—	—	—	—	BPI: Gold	What Will the Neighbours Say?
"Hip to Hip" (V)	2004	5	—	—	—	—	—	—	—	—	—		You Stood Up
"I'll Stand By You" (Girls Aloud)	2004	1	—	—	—	—	85	—	—	—	—	BPI: Silver	What Will the Neighbours Say?
"Giving You Up" (Kylie Minogue)	2004	6	8	25	—	27	23	—	40	—	—		Ultimate Kylie
"Wake Me Up" (Girls Aloud)	2004	4	—	—	—	—	—	—	—	—	—		What Will the Neighbours Say?
"Long Hot Summer" (Girls Aloud)	2005	7	—	—	—	—	—	—	—	—	—		Chemistry
"Red Dress" (Sugababes)	2005	4	22	35	17	27	10	16	31	—	—		Taller in More Ways
"Can't Resist" (Texas)	2005	13	—	—	—	—	—	—	—	—	—		Red Book
"Biology" (Girls Aloud)	2005	4	26	—	—	—	—	—	—	—	—	BPI: Silver	Chemistry
"See the Day" (Girls Aloud)	2005	9	—	—	—	—	—	—	—	—	—		Chemistry
"Whole Lotta History" (Girls Aloud)	2005	6	—	—	—	—	—	—	—	—	—		Chemistry
"I'm Not Shy" (Frank)	2006	40	—	—	—	—	—	—	—	—	—		Devil's Got Your Gold
"Something Kinda Ooooh" (Girls Aloud)	2006	3	—	—	—	—	—	—	—	—	—	BPI: Silver	The Sound of Girls Aloud
"I Think We're Alone Now" (Girls Aloud)	2006	4	—	—	—	—	—	—	—	—	—		The Sound of Girls Aloud
"Knockdown" (Alesha Dixon)	2006	45	—	—	—	—	—	—	—	—	—		Fired Up
"Sexy! No No No..." (Girls Aloud)	2007	5	—	—	—	—	—	—	—	—	—		Tangled Up
"Call the Shots" (Girls Aloud)	2007	3	—	—	—	—	—	—	—	—	—	BPI: Gold	Tangled Up
"Can't Speak French" (Girls Aloud)	2007	9	—	—	—	—	—	—	—	—	—	BPI: Silver	Tangled Up
"Theme to St. Trinian's" (Girls Aloud)	2007	51	—	—	—	—	—	—	—	—	—		St. Trinian's OST
"Sanctuary" (Gabriella Cilmi)	2007	—	—	8	—	67	72	—	—	—	—		Lessons to Be Learned
"Sweet About Me" (Gabriella Cilmi)	2008	6	1	3	1	2	1	6	2	25	—	BPI: Gold; ARIA: Platinum; BVMI: Platinum; BEA: Gold; IFPI DEN: Platinum; IFPI SWI: Platinum	Lessons to Be Learned
"Save the Lies" (Gabriella Cilmi)	2008	33	—	—	—	—	—	—	—	—	—		Lessons to Be Learned
"Don't Wanna Go to Bed Now" (Gabriella Cilmi)	2008	—	28	—	—	—	—	—	—	—	—		Lessons to Be Learned
"Warm This Winter" (Gabriella Cilmi)	2008	22	—	—	—	—	—	—	—	—	—		Lessons to Be Learned
"The Promise" (Girls Aloud)	2008	1	—	—	—	—	—	—	—	—	—	BPI: Platinum	Out of Control
"The Loving Kind" (Girls Aloud)	2008	10	—	—	—	—	—	—	—	—	—		Out of Control
"Untouchable" (Girls Aloud)	2008	11	—	—	—	—	—	—	—	—	—		Out of Control
"The Boy Does Nothing" (Alesha Dixon)	2008	5	8	16	3	40	5	—	7	7	—	BPI: Gold; ARIA: Gold; PMAE: x2 Platinum; FIN: Gold	The Alesha Show
"Love Etc." (Pet Shop Boys)	2009	14	—	18	—	12	76	—	19	60	—		Yes
"Beautiful People" (Pet Shop Boys)	2009	—	—	—	—	65	—	—	—	—	—		Yes
"Did You See Me Coming?" (Pet Shop Boys)	2009	21	—	—	—	49	—	—	—	—	—		Yes
"Don't Wanna Run No More" (Vagabond)	2009	41	—	—	—	—	—	—	—	—	—		You Don't Know the Half of It
"Left My Heart in Tokyo" (Mini Viva)	2009	7	—	—	—	—	—	—	—	—	—		Non-album single
"I Wish" (Mini Viva)	2009	71	—	—	—	—	—	—	—	—	—		Non-album single

=== 2010s ===
Title	Year	Peak chart positions									Certifications	Album
Title	Year	UK	AUS	BEL (FL)	GER	NL	NZ	SWI	SWE	US	Certifications	Album
"Hearts Don't Lie" (Gabriella Cilmi)	2010	134	51	—	—	—	—	—	—	—		Ten
"I'm Not Mad" (Alex Gardner)	2010	44	—	—	—	—	—	—	—	—		Non-album single
"One Touch" (Mini Viva)	2010	124	—	—	—	—	—	—	—	—		Non-album single
"Champagne Lemonade" (Ed Drewett)	2010	84	—	—	—	—	—	—	—	—		Non-album single
"Together" (Pet Shop Boys)	2010	58	—	—	60	—	—	—	—	—		Ultimate
"Don't Know Why" (SoundGirl)	2011	45	—	11	—	—	—	—	—	—		Non-album single
"All Fired Up" (The Saturdays)	2011	3	—	—	—	—	—	—	—	—	BPI: Silver	On Your Radar
"Mama Do the Hump" (Rizzle Kicks)	2011	2	56	55	—	—	—	—	—	—	BPI: Platinum	Stereo Typical
"Picking Up the Pieces" (Paloma Faith)	2012	7	—	—	—	—	30	—	—	—	BPI: Gold	Fall to Grace
"You Bring Me Joy" (Amelia Lily)	2012	2	—	—	—	67	—	—	—	—		Non-album single
"Change Your Life" (Little Mix)	2012	12	8	—	—	—	29	—	—	—	BPI: Silver; ARIA: x2 Platinum; RMNZ: Gold	DNA
"Something New" (Girls Aloud)	2012	2	—	—	—	—	—	—	—	—	BPI: Silver	Ten
"Shut Up (And Give Me Whatever You Got)" (Amelia Lily)	2013	11	—	—	—	—	—	—	—	—		Non-album single
"Party Over" (Amelia Lily)	2013	40	—	—	—	—	—	—	—	—		Non-album single
"Not Giving Up" (The Saturdays)	2013	19	—	—	—	—	—	—	—	—		Living for the Weekend
"What Are You Waiting For?" (The Saturdays)	2014	38	—	—	—	—	—	—	—	—		Finest Selection: The Greatest Hits
"Runnin' (Lose It All)" (Naughty Boy featuring Beyonce and Arrow Benjamin)	2015	4	22	16	85	19	10	23	70	90	BPI: Platinum; ARIA: Gold; RMNZ: Platinum; FIMI: Gold; ZPAV: x2 Platinum	non-album single
"Piece of Me" (MK and Becky Hill)	2016	37	—	32	—	—	—	—	—	—	BPI: Platinum	Get to Know
"Freedom" (Beyoncé featuring Kendrick Lamar)	2016	40	62	27	—	—	—	—	—	—		Lemonade
"Hot2Touch" (Felix Jaehn, Hight and Alex Aiono)	2017	—	—	57	12	—	—	49	—	—	BVMI: Platinum; IFPI AUT: Gold	I
"Love Made Me Do It" (Cheryl)	2018	19	—	—	—	—	—	—	—	—		Non-album single
"Something About You" (Elderbrook and Rudimental)	2019	87	—	28	—	—	—	—	—	—		Why Do We Shake in the Cold?
"Lasting Lover" (Sigala and James Arthur)	2020	17	—	—	—	—	—	41	—	—		TBA

== Full discography ==
=== 1990s ===
Year	Artist	Song	Album
1997	Dannii Minogue	"All I Wanna Do"	Girl
1997	Dannii Minogue	"Heaven Can Wait"	Girl
1997	Dannii Minogue	"If It Moves-Dub it"	Girl
1997	Dannii Minogue	"It's Amazing"	Girl
1997	Dannii Minogue	"Movin' Up"	Girl
1997	Dannii Minogue	"Keep Up with the Good Times"	Girl
1997	Saint Etienne	"Stormtrooper in Drag"	Continental
1998	Cher	"Believe"^{[a]}	Believe

- A Original production; final version produced by Mark Taylor and Brian Rawling

=== 2000s ===
Year	Artist	Song	Album
2000	Moonbaby	"Here We Go"	—N/a
2000	Moonbaby	"Deadlines & Diets"	—N/a
2000	Moonbaby	"I'm Thru with Love"	—N/a
2000	Moonbaby	"Moonbaby"	—N/a
2000	Moonbaby	"Kitsch Bitch Kool"	B-side to "Here We Go"
2001	Cher	"Alive Again" ^{[B]}	Living Proof
2001	Cher	"You Take It All" with Chicane	Living Proof
2002	Saint Etienne	"Action	Finisterre
2002	Saint Etienne	"Shower Scene"	Finisterre
2002	Sugababes	"Round Round"	Angels with Dirty Faces
2002	Sugababes	"Angels with Dirty Faces"	Angels with Dirty Faces
2003	Alexis Strum	"Nothing Good About This Goodbye"	—N/a
2003	Alexis Strum	"State of Mind"	—N/a
2003	Chicane	"Love on the Run" with Peter Cunnah	Easy to Assemble
2003	Natacha Atlas	"Who's My Baby?" with Niara Scarlett	Something Dangerous
2003	Natacha Atlas	"When I Close My Eyes" with Myra Boyle	Something Dangerous
2003	Natacha Atlas	"Quand Je Ferme Les Yeux"	Something Dangerous
2003	Girls Aloud	"Sound of the Underground"	Sound of the Underground
2003	Girls Aloud	"No Good Advice"	Sound of the Underground
2003	Girls Aloud	"Some Kind of Miracle"	Sound of the Underground
2003	Girls Aloud	"Life Got Cold"	Sound of the Underground
2003	Girls Aloud	"Stop"	Sound of the Underground
2003	Girls Aloud	"Love/Hate"	Sound of the Underground
2003	Girls Aloud	"Jump"	Sound of the Underground
2003	Girls Aloud	"You Freak Me Out"	Sound of the Underground
2003	Girls Aloud	"Girls on Film"	Sound of the Underground
2003	Girls Aloud	"Lights, Music, Camera, Action!"	B-side to "Life Got Cold"
2003	Girls Aloud	"Grease"	B-side to "Jump"
2003	Mel Blatt	"Do Me Wrong"	Do Me Wrong
2003	Abs	"Miss Perfect"	Abstract Theory
2003	Abs	"7 Ways"	Abstract Theory
2003	Lene	"Here We Go"	Play with Me
2003	Lene	"We Wanna Party"	Play with Me
2003	Sugababes	"Hole in the Head"	Three
2003	Sugababes	"Situation's Heavy"	Three
2003	Sugababes	"Twisted"	Three
2003	Sugababes	"In the Middle"	Three
2003	Sugababes	"Who"	B-side to "Hole in the Head"
2003	Sugababes	"Someone in My Bed"	B-side to "Too Lost in You"
2004	Jem	"Falling for You"	Finally Woken
2004	Jason Downs	"Taste of the Action"	The Spin
2004	Jason Downs	"Everything Is Love"	The Spin
2004	Jason Downs	"Heaven & Hell"	The Spin
2004	Jason Downs	"Dirty Mind"	The Spin
2004	Mania	"Looking for a Place"	—N/a
2004	Mania	"Close"	—N/a
2004	Mania	"Money in My Pocket"	—N/a
2004	Mania	"L.O.V."	—N/a
2004	Mania	"Baby When You Go"	—N/a
2004	Mania	"I'm Not Shy"	—N/a
2004	Mania	"If You Need a Good Girl"	B-sides to "Looking for a Place"
2004	Mania	"D.N.A."	B-sides to "Looking for a Place"
2004	V	"Hip to Hip"	You Stood Up
2004	V	"Angels"	You Stood Up
2004	V	"Fools"	You Stood Up
2004	Girls Aloud	"The Show"	What Will the Neighbours Say?
2004	Girls Aloud	"Love Machine"	What Will the Neighbours Say?
2004	Girls Aloud	"I'll Stand by You"	What Will the Neighbours Say?
2004	Girls Aloud	"Wake Me Up"	What Will the Neighbours Say?
2004	Girls Aloud	"Deadlines & Diets"	What Will the Neighbours Say?
2004	Girls Aloud	"Big Brother"	What Will the Neighbours Say?
2004	Girls Aloud	"Hear Me Out"	What Will the Neighbours Say?
2004	Girls Aloud	"Graffiti My Soul"	What Will the Neighbours Say?
2004	Girls Aloud	"Real Life"	What Will the Neighbours Say?
2004	Girls Aloud	"Here We Go"	What Will the Neighbours Say?
2004	Girls Aloud	"Thank Me Daddy"	What Will the Neighbours Say?
2004	Girls Aloud	"I Say a Prayer for You"	What Will the Neighbours Say?
2004	Girls Aloud	"100 Different Ways"	What Will the Neighbours Say?
2004	Girls Aloud	"Androgynous Girls"	B-side to "Love Machine"
2004	Girls Aloud	"History"	B-sides to "Wake Me Up"
2004	Girls Aloud	"Loving Is Easy"	B-sides to "Wake Me Up"
2004	Kylie Minogue	"Giving You Up"	Ultimate Kylie
2004	Kylie Minogue	"Made of Glass"	B-side to "Giving You Up"
2004	Kylie Minogue	"Loving You"	—N/a
2005	Saint Etienne	"Lightning Strikes Twice"	Tales from Turnpike House
2005	Saint Etienne	"Stars Above Us"	Tales from Turnpike House
2005	Saint Etienne	"Got a Job"	B-Sides & Others
2005	Rachel Stevens	"Nothing Good About This Goodbye"	Come and Get It
2005	Rachel Stevens	"Funny How"	Come and Get It
2005	Sugababes	"Red Dress"	Taller in More Ways
2005	Sugababes	"Ace Reject"	Taller in More Ways
2005	Bananarama	"Middle of Nowhere"	Drama
2005	Texas	"Can't Resist"	Red Book
2005	Texas	"Cry"	Red Book
2005	Texas	"Get Down Tonight"	Red Book
2005	Texas	"Bad Weather"	Red Book
2005	Girls Aloud	"Intro"	Chemistry
2005	Girls Aloud	"Models"	Chemistry
2005	Girls Aloud	"Biology"	Chemistry
2005	Girls Aloud	"Wild Horses"	Chemistry
2005	Girls Aloud	"See the Day"	Chemistry
2005	Girls Aloud	"Watch Me Go"	Chemistry
2005	Girls Aloud	"Waiting"	Chemistry
2005	Girls Aloud	"Whole Lotta History"	Chemistry
2005	Girls Aloud	"Long Hot Summer"	Chemistry
2005	Girls Aloud	"Swinging London Town"	Chemistry
2005	Girls Aloud	"It's Magic"	Chemistry
2005	Girls Aloud	"No Regrets"	Chemistry
2005	Girls Aloud	"Racy Lacey"	Chemistry
2005	Girls Aloud	"I Wish It Could Be Christmas Everyday"	Chemistry
2005	Girls Aloud	"I Wanna Kiss You So (Christmas in a Nutshell)"	Chemistry
2005	Girls Aloud	"Jingle Bell Rock"	Chemistry
2005	Girls Aloud	"Not Tonight Santa"	Chemistry
2005	Girls Aloud	"White Christmas"	Chemistry
2005	Girls Aloud	"Count the Days"	Chemistry
2005	Girls Aloud	"Christmas Round at Ours"	Chemistry
2005	Girls Aloud	"Merry Xmas Everybody"	Chemistry
2005	Girls Aloud	"Nobody but You"	B-side to "Biology"
2005	Girls Aloud	"I Don't Really Hate You"	B-side to "See the Day"
2005	Girls Aloud	"Crazy Fool"	B-side to "Whole Lotta History"
2006	Frank	"I'm Not Shy"	Devil's Got Your Gold
2006	Frank	"Complicated"	Devil's Got Your Gold
2006	Frank	"Closer to Me"	Devil's Got Your Gold
2006	Frank	"Don't Wait Up"	Devil's Got Your Gold
2006	Frank	"Money in My Pocket"	Devil's Got Your Gold
2006	Frank	"If the Devil's Got Your Gold"	Devil's Got Your Gold
2006	Frank	"Turn It Up"	Devil's Got Your Gold
2006	Frank	"All I Ever Do"	Devil's Got Your Gold
2006	Frank	"Silence"	Devil's Got Your Gold
2006	Frank	"Never Left a Girl"	Devil's Got Your Gold
2006	Frank	"Wake Up"	Devil's Got Your Gold
2006	Frank	"Palm of Your Hand"	Devil's Got Your Gold
2006	Frank	"Mr. Beautiful"	B-side to "I'm Not Shy"
2006	Girls Aloud	"Something Kinda Ooooh"	The Sound of Girls Aloud
2006	Girls Aloud	"Money"	The Sound of Girls Aloud
2006	Girls Aloud	"I Think We're Alone Now"	The Sound of Girls Aloud
2006	Girls Aloud	"Hanging on the Telephone"	The Sound of Girls Aloud
2006	Girls Aloud	"Loving Is Easy"	The Sound of Girls Aloud
2006	Girls Aloud	"Singapore"	The Sound of Girls Aloud
2006	Girls Aloud	"Sacred Trust"	The Sound of Girls Aloud
2006	Girls Aloud	"The Crazy Life"	B-side to "Something Kinda Ooooh"
2006	Girls Aloud	"Why Do It?"	B-side to "I Think We're Alone Now"
2006	Alesha Dixon	"Knockdown"	Fired Up
2007	Sophie Ellis-Bextor	"If You Go"	Trip the Light Fantastic
2007	Sugababes	"Never Gonna Dance Again"	Change
2007	Sugababes	"My Love Is Pink"	Change
2007	Franz Ferdinand	"Sound and Vision"	Radio 1 Established 1967
2007	Girls Aloud	"Call the Shots"	Tangled Up
2007	Girls Aloud	"Close to Love"	Tangled Up
2007	Girls Aloud	"Sexy! No No No..."	Tangled Up
2007	Girls Aloud	"Girl Overboard"	Tangled Up
2007	Girls Aloud	"Can't Speak French"	Tangled Up
2007	Girls Aloud	"Black Jacks"	Tangled Up
2007	Girls Aloud	"Control of the Knife"	Tangled Up
2007	Girls Aloud	"Fling"	Tangled Up
2007	Girls Aloud	"What You Crying For"	Tangled Up
2007	Girls Aloud	"I'm Falling"	Tangled Up
2007	Girls Aloud	"Damn"	Tangled Up
2007	Girls Aloud	"Crocodile Tears"	Tangled Up
2007	Girls Aloud	"Teenage Dirtbag"	Radio 1 Established 1967
2007	Girls Aloud	"Theme to St. Trinian's"	St. Trinian's: The Soundtrack
2007	Girls Aloud	"On My Way to Satisfaction"	St. Trinian's: The Soundtrack
2007	Girls Aloud	"Dog Without a Bone"	B-side to "Sexy! No No No..."
2007	Girls Aloud	"Blow Your Cover"	B-side to "Call the Shots"
2007	Girls Aloud	"Hoxton Heroes"	B-sides to "Can't Speak French"
2007	Girls Aloud	"Je ne parle pas Français"	B-sides to "Can't Speak French"
2008	Gabriella Cilmi	"Save the Lies"	Lessons to Be Learned
2008	Gabriella Cilmi	"Sweet About Me"	Lessons to Be Learned
2008	Gabriella Cilmi	"Sanctuary"	Lessons to Be Learned
2008	Gabriella Cilmi	"Einstein"	Lessons to Be Learned
2008	Gabriella Cilmi	"Got No Place to Go"	Lessons to Be Learned
2008	Gabriella Cilmi	"Don't Wanna Go to Bed Now"	Lessons to Be Learned
2008	Gabriella Cilmi	"Messy"	Lessons to Be Learned
2008	Gabriella Cilmi	"Awkward Game"	Lessons to Be Learned
2008	Gabriella Cilmi	"Safer"	Lessons to Be Learned
2008	Gabriella Cilmi	"Cigarettes and Lies"	Lessons to Be Learned
2008	Gabriella Cilmi	"Terrifying"	Lessons to Be Learned
2008	Gabriella Cilmi	"Sit in the Blues"	Lessons to Be Learned
2008	Gabriella Cilmi	"Echo Beach"	Lessons to Be Learned
2008	Gabriella Cilmi	"Round and Round"	Lessons to Be Learned
2008	Gabriella Cilmi	"Warm This Winter"	Lessons to Be Learned
2008	Gabriella Cilmi	"This Game"	B-side to "Sweet About Me"
2008	Gabriella Cilmi	"Cry Me a River"	B-sides to "Save the Lies"
2008	Gabriella Cilmi	"Fly Me to the Moon"	B-sides to "Save the Lies"
2008	Gabriella Cilmi	"Ob-La-Di, Ob-La-Da (Life Goes On)"	Mojo Presents: The White Album Recovered, Vol. 1
2008	Girls Aloud	"The Promise"	Out of Control
2008	Girls Aloud	"The Loving Kind"	Out of Control
2008	Girls Aloud	"Rolling Back the Rivers in Time"	Out of Control
2008	Girls Aloud	"Love Is the Key"	Out of Control
2008	Girls Aloud	"Turn to Stone"	Out of Control
2008	Girls Aloud	"Untouchable"	Out of Control
2008	Girls Aloud	"Fix Me Up"	Out of Control
2008	Girls Aloud	"Love Is Pain"	Out of Control
2008	Girls Aloud	"Miss You Bow Wow"	Out of Control
2008	Girls Aloud	"Revolution in the Head"	Out of Control
2008	Girls Aloud	"Live in the Country"	Out of Control
2008	Girls Aloud	"We Wanna Party"	Out of Control
2008	Girls Aloud	"She"	B-side to "The Promise"
2008	Girls Aloud	"Memory of You"	B-side to "The Loving Kind"
2008	Girls Aloud	"It's Your Dynamite"	B-side to "Untouchable"
2008	Saint Etienne	"Burnt Out Car" (Xenomania 2008 Mix)	London Conversations: The Best of
2008	Alesha Dixon	"Cinderella Shoe"	The Alesha Show
2008	Alesha Dixon	"The Boy Does Nothing"	The Alesha Show
2008	Alesha Dixon	"Play Me"	The Alesha Show
2008	Alesha Dixon	"Italians Do It Better"	The Alesha Show
2008	Alesha Dixon	"Ooh Baby I Like It Like That"	The Alesha Show
2008	Alesha Dixon	"I'm Thru"	The Alesha Show
2008	Alesha Dixon	"The Light"	The Alesha Show
2008	Alesha Dixon	"Mystery" (hidden track)	The Alesha Show
2009	Pet Shop Boys	"Love etc."	Yes
2009	Pet Shop Boys	"All Over the World"	Yes
2009	Pet Shop Boys	"Beautiful People"	Yes
2009	Pet Shop Boys	"Did You See Me Coming?"	Yes
2009	Pet Shop Boys	"Vulnerable"	Yes
2009	Pet Shop Boys	"More Than a Dream"	Yes
2009	Pet Shop Boys	"Building a Wall"	Yes
2009	Pet Shop Boys	"King of Rome"	Yes
2009	Pet Shop Boys	"Pandemonium"	Yes
2009	Pet Shop Boys	"The Way It Used to Be"	Yes
2009	Pet Shop Boys	"Legacy"	Yes
2009	Vagabond	"Don't Wanna Run No More"	You Don't Know the Half of It
2009	Vagabond	"I Know a Girl"	You Don't Know the Half of It
2009	Vagabond	"Ladelle"	You Don't Know the Half of It
2009	Vagabond	"I've Been Wanting You"	You Don't Know the Half of It
2009	Vagabond	"I Said Hello"	You Don't Know the Half of It
2009	Vagabond	"Sweat (Until the Morning)"	You Don't Know the Half of It
2009	Vagabond	"Smile of Mona Lisa"	You Don't Know the Half of It
2009	Vagabond	"Drifting"	You Don't Know the Half of It
2009	Vagabond	"Clouded Circus"	You Don't Know the Half of It
2009	Vagabond	"I Hope You Know Better"	You Don't Know the Half of It
2009	Vagabond	"You Talk to Me"	You Don't Know the Half of It
2009	Annie	"My Love Is Better"	Don't Stop
2009	Annie	"Bad Times"	Don't Stop
2009	Annie	"Loco"	Don't Stop
2009	Annie	"When the Night"	Don't Stop
2009	Annie	"Heaven and Hell"	Don't Stop
2009	Annie	"Danny, Danny"	B-side to "I Know UR Girlfriend Hates Me"
2009	Annie	"Sweet"	All Night EP
2009	Mini Viva	"Left My Heart in Tokyo"	Cancelled
2009	Mini Viva	"I Wish"	Cancelled
2009	Jessie Malakouti	"Standing Up for the Lonely	—N/a
2009	Alesha Dixon	"The Light"	The Alesha Show – Encore
2009	Banned of St Trinian's	"Theme to St. Trinian's"	St. Trinian's II: The Legend of Fritton's Gold Soundtrack
2009	Banned of St Trinian's	"Up and Away"	St. Trinian's II: The Legend of Fritton's Gold Soundtrack
2009	Banned of St Trinian's	"We Got the Beat"	St. Trinian's II: The Legend of Fritton's Gold Soundtrack
2009	Banned of St Trinian's	"I Can Get What I Want"	St. Trinian's II: The Legend of Fritton's Gold Soundtrack
2009	Banned of St Trinian's	"Jump Off"	St. Trinian's II: The Legend of Fritton's Gold Soundtrack
2009	Sarah Harding	"Too Bad"	St. Trinian's II: The Legend of Fritton's Gold Soundtrack
2009	Sarah Harding	"Make It Easy"	St. Trinian's II: The Legend of Fritton's Gold Soundtrack
2009	Sarah Harding	"Boys Keep Swinging"	St. Trinian's II: The Legend of Fritton's Gold Soundtrack
2009	Cast of St Trinian's	"Theme to St. Trinian's"	St. Trinian's II: The Legend of Fritton's Gold Soundtrack

- B with Chicane, Ray Hedges, Mark Emmitt and Nigel Butler

=== 2010s ===
Year	Artist	Song	Album
2010	Alex Gardner	"I'm Not Mad"	—N/a
2010	Florrie	"Call 911"	—N/a
2010	Gabriella Cilmi	"Hearts Don't Lie"	Ten
2010	Mini Viva	"One Touch"	Cancelled
2010	Kylie Minogue	"Heartstrings" (Bonus track on Japanese release)	Aphrodite
2010	Kylie Minogue	"Mighty Rivers" (Bonus track on iTunes release)	Aphrodite
2010	Florrie	"Call of the Wild"	Introduction
2010	Florrie	"Give Me Your Love"	Introduction
2010	Florrie	"Summer Night"	Introduction
2010	Florrie	"Left Too Late"	Introduction
2011	Florrie	"Speed of Light"	Experiments
2011	Florrie	"Experimenting with Rugs"	Experiments
2011	Florrie	"What You Doing This For?"	Experiments
2011	Florrie	"I Took a Little Something"	Experiments
2011	Florrie	"Begging Me"	Experiments
2011	Florrie	"She Always Gets What She Wants"	Experiments
2011	The Saturdays	"All Fired Up"	On Your Radar
2011	The Saturdays	"Get Ready, Get Set"	On Your Radar
2011	The Wanted	"I'll Be Your Strength"	Battleground
2011	Rebecca Ferguson	"Mr. Bright Eyes"	Heaven
2012	Florrie	"Shot You Down"	Late
2012	Florrie	"I'm Gonna Get You Back"	Late
2012	Florrie	"Every Inch"	Late
2012	Florrie	"To the End"	Late
2012	Amelia Lily	"You Bring Me Joy"	Be a Fighter
2012	Rebecca Ferguson	"Good Days, Bad Days"	Heaven
2012	Little Mix	"Pretend It's OK"	DNA
2012	Girls Aloud	"Something New"	Ten
2012	Girls Aloud	"Every Now and Then"	Ten
2013	Amelia Lily	"Shut Up (And Give Me Whatever You Got)"	Cancelled
2013	Amelia Lily	"Party Over"	Cancelled
2013	Florrie	"Live a Little"	Live a Little
2014	Florrie	"Seashells"	Sirens
2014	Florrie	"Free Falling"	Sirens
2014	The Saturdays	"What Are You Waiting For?"	Finest Selection: The Greatest Hits
2017	Liv Lovelle	"Won't Say Too Much"	Upcoming Album
2017	Mollie King	"Hair Down"	Upcoming Album
2017	Nadine Coyle	"Go to Work"	Upcoming Album
2019	Unperfect	"Gots to Give the Girl"	N/A
2019	Paige Cavell	"Predators & Monsters"	N/A
