= Hayley Angel Holt =

English actress

- Born: London, England, UK
- Education: London Studio Centre
- Occupation: Writer. Director. Actress.
- Website: hayleyholt.co.uk

Hayley Angel Holt is a writer, director and actress born in London, England.

== Early life ==
Holt spent the formative years of her childhood growing up in the South Bank area. She was originally brought up in Southwark, and educated at the Grey Coat Hospital in Sloane Square. She studied drama at the Anna Scher Theatre, she also received full scholarships to study dance, citing Kate Bush to Golden Age movie stars such as Fred Astaire & Ginger Rogers as inspirations to train in Classical Ballet and Contemporary Dance at the London Studio Centre, a world-class Conservatoire.

Holt's father is John Wardle, stage name Jah Wobble, bassist in Post Punk band Public Image Ltd. She was brought up entirely by her mother, Margaret, of Welsh and French-Lebanese descent. Holt's maternal grandmother lived in Alexandria and Mansoura, Egypt, where her grandfather Joseph Fabri was awarded the prestigious Order of the Nile, for his services to Egypt, given to foreign nationals who helped the nation, and the highest civilian award of Egypt. Only six were awarded that year.

== Career ==
Holt presented CBBC's Science programme BiteSize as a teenager and was the Face of Trouble TV, guest appearing in ITV's Noah's Ark, leading in 2000 to Holt's first break playing the daughter of Anita Dobson and Leslie Grantham in the screen revival for two-part drama The Stretch for Sky1. She also guest starred in an episode of the BBC drama The Robinsons with Hugh Bonneville and Martin Freeman.

She played one of the lead roles as drummer Neve, on Channel 4 TV series Totally Frank, about a girl band, which aired between 2005 and 2006. Holt was signed to Polydor Records having played the drums for this role. She went on to support Girls Aloud on their 2006 UK arena Tour, including Wembley Arena and toured nationwide UK venues as the band Frank, who also released a top 40 single and album.

Holt played Kitty Mason in the critically acclaimed Sky drama, Martina Cole's The Take opposite Tom Hardy and Brian Cox. She appeared in the 2008 cult rockabilly horror film Flick (released in North America late Nov 2010) as Young Sally Andrews alongside Faye Dunaway, and Liz Smith.

Holt appeared as the lead actress Sophie in the debut of the comedy musical Departure Lounge at the George Square Theatre, which won the Scotsman Edinburgh Fringe award for Best Music. In 2014, Holt played the role of Welsh party girl Angharad in comedy Three Little Birds for New Diorama Theatre.

Hayley Holt is a legal scholar and advocate. She is the 2024 recipient of Middle Temple's Major Diplock Scholarship and previously interned at the Supreme Court of the United Kingdom. Her advocacy and writing address special educational needs (SEN) and education-related issues, alongside family law and financial remedies. Holt has created socially engaged theatre for the Almeida Theatre and Battersea Arts Centre. Her 2025 article, Applied Theatre and the Advocacy Gap in Financial Remedies, examines how applied-theatre techniques can inform advocacy and communication in financial-remedy proceedings, including cases involving special educational needs. In August 2026, she co-authored Assessment of Hierarchical Needs Under the Government's Proposed Reforms with Michael Allum and Rhys Taylor, examining the Government's proposed hierarchical approach to assessing financial needs in family law.

After being selected to train and work as a director and facilitator at the Almeida Theatre, Holt went on to study for an MA in Applied Theatre (in the Criminal Justice System) at the Royal Central School of Speech and Drama. She wrote a paper exploring whether comedy can be used as an effective communication tool to challenge mainstream society and its existing perspectives of the socially excluded. Her later work examines how narrative techniques can distil complex and nuanced ideas into persuasive legal advocacy.

As a writer, Holt was a top finalist for the prestigious BBC Caroline Aherne Bursary in 2019.. Holt has been recognised as an Artist to "Watch Out For" in the Evening Standard, made the front cover the Times Culture Magazine section and has been featured in Company magazine.

As a Director, Holt was an associate director on Educated at Battersea Arts Centre. An associate director on BOUDICCA at Jacksons Lane, and various projects for socially impactful theatres, including Almeida Theatre, Arcola Theatre, and Access All Areas Theatre Company.

== Filmography ==
(includes Made-For-Television movies and TV Series)

- La La Land (TV pilot) (2012) as Coco
- Dust (2011) as Annabel
- Baby One More Time (unaired pilot) (2010) as Suzanne Donnelly
- The Take (episode 1) (2009) (TV series) as Kitty Mason
- Flick (2008) as Young Sally
- Fur TV (episode Rent Boys/Hot Pussy) (2008) (TV series) as Kiki LaVash
- The Bill (episode Love, Lies and Limos) (2007) (TV series) as Siobhan Docherty
- Totally Frank (2005–2006) (TV series) as Neve
- The Robinsons (episode #1.5) (2005) (TV Series) as Crowd
- The Bill (episode 291) (2005) (TV series) as Morag Jones
- Holby City (episode I'm Not in Love) (2001) (TV series) as Sharon
- Invisible Intelligence (2001) as Jess Howell
- The Bill (episodes "Gentle Touch: Part 1" and "Gentle Touch: Part 2") (2000) (TV series) as Susan Grey
- EastEnders (TV series) as Sophie (2000)
- The Stretch (2000) (TV) as Trisha Greene
- Casualty (episode "Private Lives") (1997) (TV series) as Lucy

== Stage ==
- Three Little Birds (2014) as Angharad (New Diorama Theatre)
- Departure Lounge (2008) as Sophie (4–25 August 2008 at George Square, Edinburgh Festival Fringe 08)
- The Rising of the Titanic (1999) as Annabelle

== Directing ==
- Educated (2017) as associate director (Homegrown at Battersea Arts Centre)

== Own appearances ==
- T4 (episode dated 3 August 2006) (2006) (TV series) as Herself
- Being Frank (2006) (TV) as Herself
- Holly & Stephen's Saturday Showdown (episode dated 1 July 2006) (2006) (TV series) as Herself
- T4 (episode dated 30 June 2006) (2006) (TV series) as Herself
- T4 on the Beach: The Cheeky Highlights (2006) (TV) as Herself
- Holly & Stephen's Saturday Showdown (episode dated 24 June 2006) (2006) (TV series) as Herself
- T4 on the Beach (2006) (TV) as Herself
- E4 Music Zone (episode Totally Frank's Ultimate Mix Tape) (2006) (TV series) as Herself
- T4 (episode dated 9 April 2006) (2006) (TV series) as Herself
- Smash Hits Poll Winners Party 2005 (2005) (TV) as Herself
- T4 (episode dated 25 September 2005) (2005) (TV series) as Herself
- Richard & Judy (episode dated 22 September 2005) (2005) (TV series) as Herself

== Discography ==
=== Singles ===
in Frank

Year	Single	From The Album	UK Chart Position	Ireland Charts
2006	"I'm Not Shy"	Devil's Got Your Gold	40	66

=== Albums ===
in Frank

Year	Album	UK Chart Position	Ireland Chart
2006	Devil's Got Your Gold	110	-
