= Niara Scarlett =

British singer

- Genres: Hip-hop, soul, R&B
- Occupation(s): Singer, songwriter
- Instrument: Vocals
- Years active: 2001–present
- Labels: BMG/RCA (2004–with Mania)

Niara Scarlett is a British-born singer and songwriter. She appeared on a number of dub, garage, grime, and house singles in the latter half of the 1990s and the 2000s.

== Background ==
Scarlett has co-written some of the most influentional pop songs of the past ten years, including Girls Aloud's debut single "Sound of the Underground" and "Hole in the Head" by Sugababes.

In 2004, she released "Looking for a Place" as part of a duo Mania, consisting of Scarlett and Giselle Sommerville. Mania was a joint venture between producer Brian Higgins and BMG. An album, Do You Know Your Daughter's on the Roof, was planned, but never saw the light of day due to the disappointing chart position of "Looking for a Place". British music magazine NME describe their music as "state of the art R&B from the new Sugababes".

Scarlett has a writing credit on the debut solo single by Mutya Buena. Scarlett is also credited alongside Matt Ward and Dean Gillard on "Real Girl", which heavily samples the Lenny Kravitz song "It Ain't Over 'Til It's Over".

== Guest appearances and miscellaneous ==
She appeared on "Swords in the Dirt" in 2001 alongside Fallacy, Rodney P, Blackitude, Big P and Skeme. The song was featured on the album Run Come Save Me by British rapper Roots Manuva. The following year, Scarlett appeared on the Cinematic Orchestra's "Horizon". In 2003, Niara Scarlett featured on Natacha Atlas' "Who's My Baby" for the album Something Dangerous. In April 2006, she featured on the single "The Edge" with British grime rapper Akala, whereby she was credited as simply Niara. The video received moderate rotation on MTV Base but the song failed to become a commercial success.

Niara Scarlett has appeared on the following songs:

- Helen T. – Jake's Progress (1996)
- Prophets of Sound – Show U Love (1997), New Dan (2002), Breeze (2002)
- Soul Expansion – Casanova (1998)
- The Dub Project – Time Will Show, Part 1 (1998)
- Spill the Milk – Sunlight Shining Love (1998)
- Earl – I Like It (1999)
- D.E.A. Project – Montego Bay (2000)
- Agent Sumo – Sunflowers (2000), Ain't Got Time (To Stop) (2001), Why (2002)
- Roots Manuva – Swords in the Dirt (2001)
- Mutiny – The Virus (2001), Body Good (2002), Keep Love (2003)
- M. J. Cole – Honesty (2003), All Out (I'm Over You) (2003), What You Give (2003)
- Melanie Blatt – Do Me Wrong (2003) (backing vocals)
- Natacha Atlas – Who's My Baby (2003)
- The Cinematic Orchestra – Horizon (2003)
- Akala – "The Edge" (2006)
- Basement Jaxx – "Power to the People" (2014)
- DC Breaks - “No One Like You” (2017)

== Songwriting credits ==
- Frank – I'm Not Shy, Complicated, Money in My Pocket
- Girls Aloud – Sound of the Underground, Love/Hate, I'm Not Falling, Live in the Country
- Mania – Looking For No Place, If You Need A Good Girl, D.N.A., Close, Money in My Pocket, L.O.V., Baby When You Go, I'm Not Shy
- Sugababes – Hole in the Head, Who, In the Middle, Now You're Gone, Change
- Mutya Buena – Real Girl
- Monrose – Live Life Get By
- Stefanie Heinzmann – Like a Bull
- f(x) – 훌쩍 (Let's Try)
