= Bryony Afferson =

English actress and musician

- Born: 9 March 1983 (age 42); Barnsley, England
- Occupation(s): Actress, musician

Bryony Afferson (born 9 March 1983) is an English actress and musician. As a musician, she came to public attention playing guitarist Charlie in Totally Frank on British Channel 4 which led to the band Frank releasing the Devil's Got Your Gold album. She was credited for music in the BBC Films/Film London/Spring Pictures 2011 film Strawberry Fields and is a member of the band Troubadour Rose.

As an actress, Afferson frequently appears in episodes of television series. Examples include The Shadow Line, House of Anubis, Silent Witness, Luther, Father Brown, Casualty and Playhouse Presents. On stage, she appeared in On the Waterfront (based on the 1954 film) at the Theatre Royal, Haymarket and Rough Music at the King's Head Theatre
