= Flick (2008 film) =

- Directed by: David Howard
- Written by: David Howard
- Produced by: Rik Hall
- Starring: Hugh O'Conor; Faye Dunaway; Liz Smith; Michelle Ryan; Mark Benton; Julia Foster
- Cinematography: Chris Seager
- Edited by: Madoc Roberts
- Music by: Richard Hawley
- Release date: 12 October 2008 (Raindance Film Festival)
- Running time: 96 minutes
- Country: United Kingdom
- Language: English

Flick is a campy British horror film written and directed by David Howard, and starring Hugh O'Conor and Faye Dunaway. It had its theatrical release in 2008, and the DVD of the film was released in the United Kingdom on 19 October 2009. The film was shot in Wales, in and around Cardiff, Pontypool, Newbridge (Caerphilly) and Briton Ferry.

== Plot ==
Memphis cop Lieutenant McKenzie is called in to investigate a series of strange deaths and weird sightings following the resurrection of a murder victim, a local boy named Johnny 'Flick' Taylor (Hugh O'Conor) from the 1950s, who is brought back to life in modern times and tries to find his teenage sweetheart named Sally who is now aged 62 and also to seek revenge for his death.

== Cast ==
- Faye Dunaway as Lieutenant Annie McKenzie
- Hugh O'Conor as Johnny
- Mark Benton as Sergeant Miller
- Michelle Ryan as Sandra
- Julia Foster as Sally Andrews
- Terence Rigby as Creeper Martin
- Liz Smith as Johnny's Mother
- John Woodvine as Dr. Nickel
- Richard Hawley as Bobby Blade
- Geoffrey Hughes as Tony Ray
- Anna Karen as Rita Ray
- Sara Harris Davies as Diane
- Hayley Angel Wardle as Young Sally
- Kerrie Hayes as Young Sue
- Rhys Parry Jones as Dockside official
