= Feeling Fine =

Single by Alex Gardner
- Released: 27 September 2010
- Genre: Pop, synthpop
- Length: 3:38
- Label: A&M
- Songwriter(s): Gardner, Brian Higgins, Jason Resch, Kieran Jones, Tommy Baxter & Simon Tellier
- Producer(s): Xenomania

Alex Gardner singles chronology
"I'm Not Mad" (2010)	"Feeling Fine" (2010)

"Feeling Fine" is a song by Scottish recording artist Alex Gardner, released in the United Kingdom and Ireland on 27 September 2010. The song was produced by production duo Xenomania.

== Critical reception ==
- "Feeling Fine" hears the Scottish lad skilfully manoeuvre around the verses in a falsetto, recalling the tenderness of his ballad "There Goes My Heart". Much like my impressions of Girls Aloud's "Crocodile Tears", "Feeling Fine" didn't strike me as a potential until I woke up one morning with its chorus ringing in my head. Ta-dah! We have another slow-revealing Xenomania pop gem at hand. — Feed Limmy
- "Feeling Fine" is a heady blend of electronica, R'n'B and dancefloor flavours wrapped up in a perfect pop package and showcases Alex's accomplished, soul-packed vocal, which impressively swoops up to giddy falsetto heights. — Female First
- "Feeling Fine" follows the lead of "I'm Not Mad""as another top Xenomania tune. Granted, I have no idea what the hell he's saying on the Ke$ha-fied chorus, but I know that I like it. No, scratch that – I love it. Naturally, Alex's voice is built for acoustic rock and blue-eyed soul, so hearing his raspy vocals against the sleek backdrop of Xenomania's perfect productions completely adds new dimensions to tunes that may have sounded a lot more standard in the hands of somebody else. — The Prophet Blog

== Track listing ==
1. "Feeling Fine" – 3:38
2. "I Wanna Be with Her"
