= The Stretch (TV series) =

- Written by: Stephen Leather
- Directed by: Frank W. Smith
- Starring: Leslie Grantham; Anita Dobson; Nicholas Day; Daisy Beaumont; Graham McTavish; Alistair Petrie; Jim Dunk
- Composer: Brian May
- Country of origin: United Kingdom
- Original language: English
- No. of series: 1
- No. of episodes: 2

Production
- Executive producer: Paul Knight
- Producers: Stephen Leather; Ron Purdie
- Cinematography: John Simmons
- Editor: Nigel Bate
- Running time: 90 minutes
- Production company: Paul Knight Productions

Original release
- Network: Sky One
- Release: 12 November – 19 November 2000

The Stretch is a two-part British television crime drama mini-series, created and written by Stephen Leather and directed by Frank W. Smith. The series, produced by Paul Knight Productions, first broadcast on Sky One on 12 November 2000, concluding the following week. The series follows career criminal Terry Greene (Leslie Grantham), who is sentenced to life for a murder he didn't commit. His wife Sam (Anita Dobson) has two choices – to walk away from the criminal empire he'd built up, or to take it over.

The series was filmed between the UK and Spain in 1999, and was billed as the channel's “Event of the Week” for the week ending 12 November 2000. The Guardian called their chemistry in The Stretch “magical” and also praised “some tasty cameos and supporting performances.” The series' original score was composed by Dobson's husband, guitarist Brian May of Queen.

The series was later novelised by Leather himself, the first time that he had adapted a screenplay into a novel, rather than the other way round. It was published on 1 February 2001, three months after the series initially aired. The series was also released on VHS on 20 November 2000, but remains unreleased on DVD.

== Casting ==
Notably, it was the first time that Grantham and Dobson had been reunited on screen after working together on EastEnders during the late 1980s. As such, much of the publicity surrounding the series made note of the pair's on-screen reunion. Producer Paul Knight commented; "It was Anita herself who suggested that Leslie play her on-screen husband. Over the years they had talked about working together again, but nothing had appealed before The Stretch."

Grantham added, "When I read the script, I felt as though the lead roles had been written with me and Anita in mind."

== Cast ==
- Leslie Grantham as Terry Greene
- Anita Dobson as Sam Greene
- Nicholas Day as DCI Frank 'Raquel' Welch
- Daisy Beaumont as Laura Nichols
- Graham McTavish as Andy McKinley
- Alistair Petrie as Jonathon Nichols
- Jim Dunk as George Key
- Ben Robertson as Micky Fox
- Mark Cartmel as DI Doug Simpson
- Luke Goss as Warwick Locke
- Matthew Burgess as Jamie Greene
- Joan Campion as Grace Greene
- Hayley Wardle as Trisha Greene
- Jon Welch as Laurence Patterson
- Godfrey Walters as Preston Snow
- Chook Sibtain as Richard Asher
- David Telfer as Supt. Mark 'Blackie' Blackstock
- James Smith as Supt. English

== Episodes ==
No. overall	No. in series	Title	Directed by	Written by	Original release date
1	1	"Part 1"	Frank W. Smith	Stephen Leather	12 November 2000
2	2	"Part 2"	Frank W. Smith	Stephen Leather	19 November 2000
