= California (Amelia Lily song) =

Single by Amelia Lily
- Released: 7 September 2014
- Recorded: 2014
- Genre: Pop rock; pop punk
- Length: 3:28
- Label: East West; Warner
- Songwriter(s): Amelia Lily; Tim Woodcock; Steve Rushton

Amelia Lily singles chronology
"Party Over" (2013)	"California" (2014)

"California" is a song recorded by British singer Amelia Lily, released as her fourth overall single. The track was co-written by Lily, Tim Woodcock and Steve Rushton. The track was released on 7 September 2014 in the United Kingdom.

== Background ==
In an interview with the Metro, Lily revealed that the song was about a long-distance relationship between a male and female who are constantly flying between London and Los Angeles and keep passing each other. She refused to say whether or not it had anything to do with her relationship with Adam Pitts of Lawson, whom she previously dated.

The single was released via East West Records after Lily signed a new record deal with the label in April 2014. The singer departed Sony Music and Xenomania following the catastrophic handling of her original debut album, which was scrapped and remains unreleased. Lily said of the track, "Life has never been so exciting – I've been busy in the studio writing and recording songs for my upcoming debut album, and 'California' is where we start. I'm so proud to be releasing this music; I have put my heart and soul into writing them. Expect a few surprises along the way though – it's going to be fun!"

== Music video ==
The music video was filmed in Los Angeles, California and directed by Charlotte Rutherford. The male model in the music video is Chris Schellenger from America's Next Top Model (cycle 20).

== Track listing ==
Digital only-single

1. California – 3:28

== Chart performance ==
The single peaked at a disappointing number 83 on the UK Singles Chart, becoming her first single to miss the Top 40 and the Top 75 altogether. Nevertheless, based on sales alone, the track peaked at number 55.

== Charts ==
Chart (2014)	Peak position
Scotland (OCC)	43
UK Singles (OCC)	83

== Release history ==
Country	Date	Format	Label
Ireland	5 September 2014	Digital download	East West; Warner Bros.
United Kingdom	5 September 2014	Digital download	East West; Warner Bros.
