= Totally Frank =

- Starring: Hayley Holt; Lauren Blake; Bryony Afferson; Helena Dowling
- Country of origin: United Kingdom

Production
- Running time: 25 min.

Original release
- Network: Channel 4
- Release: 25 September 2005 – 9 July 2006

Totally Frank is a British youth comedy drama television series from Channel 4. It follows a real-life band, Frank, who were struggling to make it in the music industry. It ran for two series in 2005 and 2006.

== Frank ==
The band on the show consisted of lead singer Tasha (Lauren Blake born 18 August 1983), guitarist Charlie (Bryony Afferson born 9 March 1983) keyboard player Flo (Helena Dowling born 20 December 1986) and drummer Neve (Hayley Holt born 27 February 1983). Their first single, I'm Not Shy, was released on 31 July 2006 in the UK. Their debut album, "Devil's Got Your Gold", was released on 7 August 2006 in the UK by Polydor Records.

== Series ==
The show had two series, both of which had 13 episodes. The first series began with the four main characters taking part in fictitious reality show, Fame Maker, with another girl, Sammi, who goes on to win the show. The second series started on 9 April 2006 with storylines including Tasha leaving her solo deal, Neve and Tasha's rift, Flo breaking Jason's heart again and Charlie's dad dying.

The series was cancelled when the real band had been dropped by their record label and decided to split up on 11 September 2006. The DVD release of the show was cancelled.

== Characters ==
22-year-old Tasha (Lauren Blake) is the front woman and the emotional driving force behind the band: the one with the vision and the sheer unstoppable enthusiasm to pull this thing off. Tasha automatically takes on the 'mum' role to her bandmates but she is totally clueless in matters of romance.

Tasha may have the energy, but 22-year-old Neve (Hayley Holt) is the one with the cred. She seems to know everything about every band that ever was. She has spent years gigging. She has been the drummer in a couple of bands before that ‘nearly made it’ but did not.

Sweet and unoffensive, Flo (Helena Dowling) is the baby of the group, even though at 22 she is the same age as the others. Flo is a bit of a daddy's girl, and is torn between the grounded world of her family and fiancé and the exciting, unpredictable world of life in a band.

For 21-year-old Charlie (Bryony Afferson), being a famous musician is more important to her than being best mates with the other girls. She is deeply competitive and insecure about her songwriting around the others, particularly Neve. Charlie always assumed she would be a solo star, not a band member.

== Soundtrack ==
The show featured many performances from the band and included other music.

Series 1 Theme Song Frank – "Complicated"

Series 1 Episode 1 Frank – "Total Eclipse Of The Heart" (Live)

Series 1 Episode 2 Frank – "I'm Not Shy"
Frank – "Complicated"

Series 1 Episode 3 Frank – "I'm Not Shy"

Series 1 Episode 4 Frank – "News About You" (Remix)
Frank – "News About You" (Live)
Frank – "Complicated"
Frank – "News About You"

Series 1 Episode 5 Frank – "Complicated"
Frank – "Silence"

Series 1 Episode 6 Bryony Afferson – "Money In My Pocket" (Live)
Frank – "Money In My Pocket"

Series 1 Episode 7 Helena Dowling – "Silence" (Live)
Frank – "I'm Not Shy"

Series 1 Episode 8 Frank – "White Wedding"

Series 1 Episode 9 Frank – "Silence"

Series 1 Episode 10 Frank – "Money In My Pocket" (Rock Version)
Frank – "Silence"
Frank – "Don't Wait Up"

Series 1 Episode 11 Frank – "Money In My Pocket"

Series 1 Episode 12 Frank – "Complicated"

Series 1 Episode 13 Frank – "Don't Wait Up"

Series 2 Theme Song Frank – "Turn It Up"

Series 2 Episode 1 Lauren Blake – "Tears and Tantrums"
Bryony Afferson – "Money In My Pocket" (Live)
Frank – "I'm Not Shy" (Live)

Series 2 Episode 2 Frank – "News About You" (Alternate Mix)

Series 2 Episode 3 Kaiser Chiefs – "I Predict a Riot"
Frank – "Closer to Me"

Series 2 Episode 4 No music featured.

Series 2 Episode 5 Lauren Blake – "Turn It Up" (Acoustic Version)
Frank – "Turn It Up"

Series 2 Episode 6 Frank – "Closer to Me" (Lights Out Version)
Frank – "Turn It Up"
Frank – "Closer to Me"

Series 2 Episode 7 Frank – "Turn It Up"

Series 2 Episode 8 Michael McKell – "Eye in the Sky"
Frank – "Turn It Up"
Michael McKell and Bryony Afferson – "Eye in the Sky"
Bryony Afferson – "Eye in the Sky"

Series 2 Episode 9 The Killers – Mr Brightside
Frank – "Never Left A Girl" (Live)
Frank – "Never Left A Girl" (Alternate Mix)

Series 2 Episode 10 Frank – "Turn It Up" (Radio Version)
Frank – "Don't Wait Up"
Frank – "Turn It Up" (Alternate Mix)

Series 2 Episode 11 Frank – "Never Left A Girl"
Frank – "All I Ever Do" (Bryony Afferson Version)

Series 2 Episode 12 Frank – "Closer to Me"
Bryony Afferson – "Eye in the Sky"

Series 2 Episode 13 Frank – "Silence" (Alternate Mix)
