= Mania (group) =

British pop duo

Mania were a British pop duo composed of Niara Scarlett and Giselle Sommerville. The two met while contributing songwriting for the British pop production house Xenomania, and formed Mania in 2004. Mania was a joint venture between the record producer Brian Higgins and BMG.

They released only one single, "Looking for a Place" which was to be the lead single of their debut album, however due to its No. 29 UK Singles Chart placing, the planned album Do You Know Your Daughter's on the Roof? was never released. Several of their songs, including "Money in My Pocket" and "I'm Not Shy", were covered by the girl group Frank, and "Baby When You Go" was covered by Girls Aloud with its eventual release on the 2024 deluxe reissue of their album What Will the Neighbours Say?. All of Mania's songs were produced by Higgins and the Xenomania team.

== Discography ==
- Looking for a Place (sampler):
1. "Looking for a Place"
2. "Close"
3. "Money in My Pocket"
4. "L.O.V."
5. "Baby When You Go"
6. "I'm Not Shy"

Two other songs, "DNA" and "If You Need a Good Girl", were released on the group's official website and on the "Looking for a Place" single respectively.
