= A-L-X =

- Born: Alex Gardner; 23 July 1991 (age 35); Edinburgh, Scotland
- Occupation: Singer
- Years active: 2010–present
- Labels: Kish Music (present); A&M, Polydor (2010–2012)

Alex Gardner, better known by his stage name, A-L-X (born 23 July 1991, Edinburgh, Scotland) is a Scottish pop singer. He released two singles in 2010 as Alex Gardner, "I'm Not Mad" and "Feeling Fine", before changing his stage name to A-L-X and releasing his third single, "Beautiful Criminal", in 2014.

== Life and career ==
=== Early life and childhood ===
Gardner was brought up in a musical atmosphere; his mother was a violinist with an orchestra and his older brother, Adam Gardner, is a singer and guitarist in Scottish metal band, Mind Set A Threat. He was given piano lessons from the age of five, but quit at the age of 6. He owned his first guitar when he was 10 years old. Having left The Edinburgh Academy aged 16, Gardner set out to start an early music career in London. He wrote "I'm Not Mad", at the age of 13, and altered the song through the course of four or five years, ultimately releasing it as his first single. It peaked at No. 44 in the UK Singles Chart.

=== Shelved debut album (2010–2012) ===
Gardner's debut single and lead single from the album "I'm Not Mad" was released on 29 March 2010 in the United Kingdom and Ireland. In the UK, Gardner performed the song on shows such as GMTV and This Morning. He performed an acoustic set of the song on the Scottish TV show The Hour, which was Gardner's debut television appearance in the United Kingdom. Gardner is working with UK production house Xenomania. He has also worked with the crew members of 'Casper'. Gardner is worked on an upcoming untitled debut album and travelled to the United States to produce more songs for his album. Nick Levine of Digital Spy gave the song a positive review stating writing that Gardner's voice is "rich, manly and blessed with an intriguing hint of huskiness to it." The tune was described as "a glossy-yet-gloomy electropop affair, and very much a grower not a shower."

Fraser McAlpine of BBC Chart Blog described the song as pleasant though unmemorable background music that is "neither so offensively irksome to my refined palate that I'm tempted to smash the speakers, or so astonishingly mind-sparklingly brilliant that my productivity shoots through the floor." He follows on to criticise the repetitive nature of the whole affair with "After the first minute or so, nothing happens. We just go round and around on the same eight bar of well-mannered, polite synthpop. Oh sure, there's a breakdown section, but it's not particularly arresting and comes across as a transparent attempt to break things up and then drum up some interest in the return of that bassline again"

To help promote the album, Gardner was one of the support acts for Pixie Lott's 'The Crazy Cats Tour' starting in November 2010. However, the album was never released and Gardner was ultimately dropped from his label.

=== Re-emergence as A-L-X (2014) ===
In 2014, Gardner updated his Twitter account to reflect his new stage name, A-L-X and performed his new single "Beautiful Criminal" as a BBC Introducing act at Radio 1's Big Weekend.

== Discography ==
=== EPs ===
Year	Title	Peak chart positions		
Year	Title	UK	SCO	ITA
As Alex Gardner
2010	Alex Gardner (Italy)	—	—	—
As A-L-X
2015	Timebomb	—	—	—

=== Singles ===
Year	Title	Peak chart positions	
Year	Title	UK	SCO
As Alex Gardner
2010	"I'm Not Mad"	44	21
2010	"Feeling Fine"	140	—
As A-L-X
2014	"Beautiful Criminal"	—	—
2014	"Allure"	—	—
2014	"Timebomb"	—	—
