= Leslie Grantham =

English actor (1947–2018)

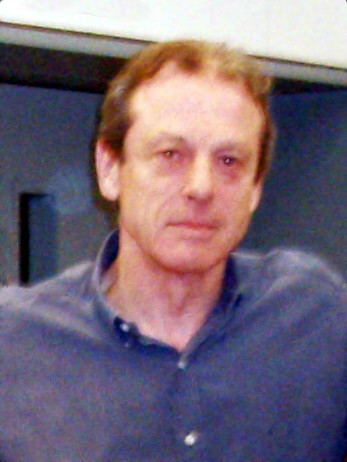
- Grantham in 2007
- Born: Leslie Michael Grantham; 30 April 1947; Camberwell, London, England
- Died: 15 June 2018 (aged 71); Kensington, London, England
- Education: Webber Douglas Academy of Dramatic Art
- Occupation: Actor
- Years active: 1982–2018
- Known for: Role of Den Watts in EastEnders (1985–1989, 2003–2005)
- Spouse: Jane Laurie (m. 1981; div. 2013)
- Children: 3

Leslie Michael Grantham (30 April 1947 – 15 June 2018) was an English actor who played "Dirty" Den Watts in the BBC soap opera EastEnders. Prior to his acting career, he was convicted of murder, having served 10 years for the killing of a West German taxi driver, and had significant press coverage resulting from an online sex scandal in 2004.

== Early life ==
Leslie Michael Grantham was born on 30 April 1947 in Camberwell, London, the son of Adelaide (née Flinders) and Walter William Grantham (1915–1998). He enlisted in the Royal Fusiliers regiment of the British Army in 1965, aged 18.

== Murder conviction ==
Grantham was soon posted to West Germany, where he quickly got into debt to army colleagues. He resorted to criminal activities in his attempt to clear the debt.

On 3 December 1966, Grantham attempted to rob a taxi driver, Felix Reese, in Osnabrück, Lower Saxony, by threatening him at gunpoint and demanding money. In a struggle between the two men, Grantham shot Reese, who died from a gunshot wound to the head. Grantham was arrested soon afterwards and charged with murder.

== Career ==
=== Early work ===
On release from prison, Grantham decided to pursue an acting career and trained at the Webber Douglas Academy of Dramatic Art. His theatre work included a role in a play at the Battersea Free Theatre written by television director Matthew Robinson. In 1982, Grantham made his television debut as Boollie in a BBC2 Playhouse edition called "Jake's End". The following year he appeared as Frank on an episode of the short lived sitcom Goodnight and God Bless. Grantham was then cast by Matthew Robinson as Kiston, the henchman of Davros, in the Doctor Who serial Resurrection of the Daleks (1984). He also played a signals sergeant in episode 12 of the television mini-series The Jewel in the Crown (1984) and wrote a play entitled A Reason To Live, which won the Gloucester Drama Festival award for Best Original Play. He made a brief appearance in the Mike Hodges film Morons from Outer Space (1985), but by the time the film was released, Grantham had gained his best known role.

=== EastEnders ===
In 1984, Grantham auditioned with the BBC for a part in its new soap opera EastEnders, which aired in February 1985. He was recommended by Matthew Robinson, who was to become a key member of the EastEnders production team. Grantham had auditioned for the role of market trader Pete Beale, but he was offered the part of Den Watts. Grantham was at the centre of EastEnders' first media scandal when news of his murder conviction broke three days after the series began; Grantham had informed producers of his conviction after winning the role, and had been allowed to continue in the series. Despite this negative publicity, the character, landlord of The Queen Victoria public house, quickly became a national favourite, and gained the nickname Dirty Den, mostly because of the unpleasant way he treated his wife Angie, played by Anita Dobson; one of the character's many affairs occurred at the age of 39, when he fathered a child with 16-year-old Michelle Fowler.

On 25 December 1986, Grantham's character served his on-screen wife with divorce papers, with the line "Happy Christmas, Ange." The episode was watched by a record 30 million viewers, over half the British population at the time.

In 1988, the character sold his pub to Frank Butcher, played by Mike Reid, and gradually drifted out of key storylines, until finally departing in February 1989, although his final scenes had been filmed the previous autumn. Grantham had announced his intention to leave the soap early in 1988, around the same time that it was announced that Dobson would be leaving. However, the series' bosses had not wanted to suffer the double blow of losing its two biggest characters so close together, and set about an intensive block of filming that would allow Den to remain on screen into 1989, while enabling Grantham to continue on EastEnders until autumn 1988.

Den had become involved with a criminal organisation called "The Firm" over the summer of 1988, and his only option was to flee the Square. After spending time on the run in Manchester, Den spent several months on remand in custody for his role in arranging the arson attack on The Dagmar pub (an act of revenge against James Willmott-Brown for the rape of Kathy Beale), and a dramatic escape from the police and from members of The Firm who ambushed him on his way to court, viewers watched a mysterious gunman shoot at Den with a gun hidden in a bunch of daffodils, before hearing a splash at the end of the episode which aired on 23 February 1989.

A shot depicting Den's death was cut from the final scene, in the hope that Grantham might one day be persuaded to return to the role. The following year, a body believed to be Den's was found in the canal.

=== Other work ===
Grantham played Danny Kane in the crime television series The Paradise Club (1989–90) alongside Don Henderson. He went on to appear in the fourth season of Cluedo as Colonel Mustard; he had previously appeared as a contestant on the 1990 Christmas special.

Grantham also appeared on The Detectives (1993) and 99-1 (1994–95). In 1994, he narrated volume one of Frank Harris's erotic classic My Life and Loves. In 1997, he produced and starred in the sci-fi mini-series The Uninvited.

Alongside Melinda Messenger, Grantham was the co-host of the game show Fort Boyard from 1998 to 2001. Also in 2001, he appeared in Lily Savage's Blankety Blank. He also reunited with his EastEnders co-star Anita Dobson in the two-part mini-series The Stretch which aired on Sky One in 2000, and in the British gangster film Charlie (2004).

=== Return to EastEnders ===
There had been much speculation in the media after Den's departure as to whether the character really was dead, particularly after the original search of the canal site where he was shot failed to uncover any trace of him. BBC bosses said that Den's return had been on the agenda almost every year since the character's departure in 1989, and the first offer for him to return had been made as long ago as 1991. Grantham had turned down every offer to return until the offer which was made to him in early 2003, feeling that his character did not have adequate links to the show for a comeback to be anything more than an attempt to boost ratings, particularly when Den's daughter Sharon was away from 1995 to 2001, leaving Den without any family in the cast. By 2003, however, his daughter Vicki had returned, and a previously unknown son, Dennis Rickman, was also in the series, being the product of an affair between Den and a young woman called Paula Rickman 30 years earlier.

On 3 May 2003, it was confirmed that Grantham would be returning to EastEnders later that year to reprise his role as Den after 14 years. On 29 September 2003, his return to EastEnders was aired, with him arriving at the nightclub E20 now owned by his adopted daughter Sharon, portrayed by Letitia Dean.

It was revealed that Den had survived the shooting and fled to Spain with the help of former mistress Jan Hammond (Jane How), while the body found a year later in the canal had been wrongly identified. 16.66 million viewers watched one of the most anticipated television events of the year on 29 September, as Den spoke the words, "Hello, princess."

In December 2004, Den arranged a scam to get back The Queen Vic from Sam Mitchell (Kim Medcalf), 16 years after he had sold it to Frank.

=== Online sex scandal ===
In May 2004, a Sunday newspaper printed photographs of Grantham exposing himself and masturbating whilst sucking his finger in a sexually suggestive manner via a webcam from his dressing room to an undercover reporter named "Amanda". Grantham also allegedly dressed as Captain Hook whilst pleasuring himself, and insulted several cast members of EastEnders, including Shane Richie (Alfie Moon), Wendy Richard (Pauline Fowler), Kim Medcalf (Sam Mitchell) and Jessie Wallace (Kat Moon).

Grantham released a statement which read, "I am wholeheartedly ashamed of my behaviour and feel that I have let down my colleagues, as well as my friends and family." He added, "In some small recompense I intend to make a donation to charity as a mark of my apology." He maintained in later interviews that he "was set up". He attempted suicide three times as a result of the scandal. In addition, in 2018 the Daily Mirror reported that he had been investigated by police for sexually abusing a schoolgirl, although the alleged victim ultimately decided not to pursue the matter.

=== Departure from EastEnders ===
In November 2004, it was confirmed that Grantham would be leaving EastEnders in the New Year. Bosses stated that the character would be killed off, but this time "the coffin lid would be nailed shut".

On 18 February 2005, 14.34 million viewers tuned in to view his character's second demise, this time at the hands of second wife Chrissie, portrayed by Tracy-Ann Oberman, who hit him over the head with a dog-shaped iron doorstop during a confrontation in the Vic.

=== After EastEnders ===
Grantham later appeared in two UK tours of Beyond Reasonable Doubt, a stage adaptation of a Jeffrey Archer play, alongside Simon Ward and Alexandra Bastedo, and performed as a Christmas pantomime villain. He directed and starred in a pantomime of Peter Pan at the Alban Arena in St Albans during Christmas 2005.

In October 2006, it was announced that, in his first television role since leaving EastEnders, he would appear in the long-running ITV1 police drama series The Bill, playing the role of Jimmy Collins, who was on the run from prison. The episode aired on 8 February 2007. This was Grantham's second appearance in The Bill.

In September 2009, Grantham appeared in EastEnders Revealed: The Return of Sam Mitchell and in February 2010, Grantham appeared in EastEnders: The Aftermath on BBC Three to mark the live episode of the show and its 25th birthday. He was interviewed by Kirsten O'Brien from the bar of The Queen Victoria pub which his character had once owned. Grantham was also cast for the lead role in the UK thriller movie DeadTime.

From 28 November to 11 December 2010, Grantham appeared as Ebenezer Scrooge in the Lincoln Theatre Royal's production of A Christmas Carol. He portrayed the main character John in the Bulgarian TV series The English Neighbour, based on the novel of the same name. In 2015, he appeared in the film Mob Handed (released in 2016) directed by Liam Galvin, playing a detective.

== Personal life and death ==
Grantham married Australian Jane Laurie in 1981. The couple had three sons and divorced in 2013. His son Daniel Laurie is also an actor, and plays Reggie Jackson in Call the Midwife.

In June 2018, it was reported that Grantham had returned to the United Kingdom from his home in Bulgaria to receive treatment for lung cancer. He died on 15 June 2018, aged 71. That evening's episode of EastEnders featured a tribute to Grantham, whilst his co-star and on-screen wife Anita Dobson described him as "a wonderful and special actor, witty and very talented." She added "I shall remember him very fondly and with affection."

== Filmography ==
=== Film ===
Year	Title	Role	Notes
1985	Morons from Outer Space	Motorway Policeman's Assistant	
1989	The Nightwatch	David Smallman	Television film
1991	The Grove Family	Bob Grove	Television film
1991	Waiting for Godot	Estragon	
1992	Gummed Labels	Terence	Television film
1995	It's Not Unusual	Cabbie	Short film
1998	Shadow Run	Liney	
1998	Crow's Nest	Mr. Shaw	
1999	The Bench	Max	Television film
2000	The Wedding Tackle	George	
2001	Lava	Aladdin	
2004	Charlie	Richard Waldeck	
2011	Dead Trust: Prequel	Dobson	Short film
2012	Deadtime	Mr. LaRoux	
2012	Acceptance	Ronnie	
2013	The Factory	Gene	
2013	Leslie	Leslie	Short film
2016	Mob Handed	The Detective	
2018	Jack Southeast	The Boss	
2018	The Krays: Dead Man Walking	Nipper Read	
2020	Search and Destroy	Anderson	
2020	Touching the Blue	Max Langton	
2020	Vengeance	Ronnie	Final film role

=== Television ===
Year	Title	Role	Notes
1979	Minder	Policeman	Episode: "Gunfight at the O.K. Laundrette"
1982	BBC2 Playhouse	Bookie	Episode: "Jake's End"
1983	Goodnight and God Bless	Frank	Episode: "Little Green-Eyed Monster"
1984	Doctor Who	Kiston	Episode: "Resurrection of the Daleks"
1984	The Jewel in the Crown	Signals Sergeant	Episode: "The Moghul Room"
1984	Dramarama	Mo's Dad	Episode: "Night of the Narrow Boats"
1985	Screen Two	Peter	Episode: "Knockback"
1985	Bulman	Alan 'Dodger' Tait	Episode: "The Name of the Game"
1985–1989, 2003–2005	EastEnders	Den Watts	Series regular; 563 episodes
1989	Winners and Losers	Eddie Burt	Miniseries; 3 episodes
1989–1990	The Paradise Club	Danny Kane	Series regular; 20 episodes
1992	Woof!	Mr. Flint	Episode: "Police Dog"
1992	The Good Guys	Nick Toth	Episode: "Horseplay"
1993	Comedy Playhouse	Roland Jackson	Episode: "Wild Oats"
1993	The Detectives	Danny Kane	Episode: "Strangers in Paradise"
1993	Cluedo	Colonel Mustard	Series regular; 6 episodes
1993	Runaway Bay	Lou Hardy	Episode: "Radio Daze"
1994–1995	99-1	Mick Raynor	Series regular; 14 episodes
1995	The Good Sex Guide		Episode: "Jeremy Hardy Gives Good Sex"
1995	Woof!	Patrick Garrett	Recurring role; 5 episodes
1996	Delta Wave	Rex Valentine	Episode: "Dodgy Jammers"
1996	Saturday Live	Mission Impossible Brief	Episode: "Series 3, Episode 6"
1997	The Uninvited	Philip Gates	Miniseries; 4 episodes
1997	Wycliffe	Patrick Durno	Episode: "Dance of the Scorpions"
1998	The Bill	Jimmy Smith	Series 14; Recurring role; 4 episodes-"Good Faith" Parts 1, 2 & 3 (Episodes 27, 28 & 29) and "The Personal Touch" (Episode 117).
1998	Noel's House Party	Barman	Recurring role; 4 episodes
1999	Bernard's Watch	Mr. Rattle	Episode: "Ending Time"
2000	Urban Gothic	Lenny's Dad	Episode: "The Boy's Club"
2000	The Stretch	Terry Greene	Miniseries; 2 episodes
2001	Gypsy Girl	Car Dealer	Episode: "Episode 6"
2002	Heartbeat	George East	Episode: "The Great Ming Mystery"
2007	The Bill	Jimmy Collins	Episode: "The Good Old Days"
