= You Don't Know the Half of It =

Studio album by Vagabond
- Released: 17 August 2009
- Recorded: 2008
- Genre: Pop, rock
- Label: Geffen, Polydor
- Producer: Xenomania

Singles from You Don't Know the Half of It
- 1. "Sweat (Until the Morning)" Released: 8 June 2009; 2. "Don't Wanna Run No More" Released: 3 August 2009; 3. "I've Been Wanting You" Released: 26 October 2009

You Don't Know the Half of It is the debut album by British band Vagabond. It was released on 17 August 2009, two weeks after their second single "Don't Wanna Run No More". The first single, "Sweat (Until the Morning)", was released on 8 June 2009.

== Track listing ==
1. "Don't Wanna Run No More"
2. "I Know a Girl"
3. "Ladelle"
4. "I've Been Wanting You"
5. "I Said Hello"
6. "Sweat (Until the Morning)"
7. "Smile of Mona Lisa"
8. "Drifting"
9. "Clouded Circus"
10. "I Hope You Know Better"
11. "You Talk to Me"

== Chart performance ==
The album debuted on the UK Albums Chart at number 27.

Chart (2009)	Peak position
UK Albums Chart	27
