= I'm Not Mad =

Single by Alex Gardner
- Released: 29 March 2010
- Genre: Pop, synthpop
- Length: 3:50
- Label: A&M
- Songwriter(s): Miranda Cooper, Alex Gardner, Brian Higgins, Owen James Parker, Tim Powell
- Producer(s): Xenomania

Alex Gardner singles chronology
"I'm Not Mad" (2010)	"Feeling Fine" (2010)

"I'm Not Mad" is the debut single from Scottish pop singer Alex Gardner. It was released as a CD single and download on 29 March 2010 in the United Kingdom and Ireland on A&M Records. The song was produced by Xenomania.

== Critical reception ==
Professional ratings
Review scores
Source	Rating
BBC	3/5 stars
Digital Spy	.

Nick Levine of Digital Spy gave the song a positive review stating writing that Gardner's voice is "rich, manly and blessed with an intriguing hint of huskiness to it." The tune was described as "a glossy-yet-gloomy electropop affair, and very much a grower not a shower."

Fraser McAlpine of BBC Chart Blog described the song as pleasant though unmemorable background music that is "neither so offensively irksome to my refined palate that I'm tempted to smash the speakers, or so astonishingly mind-sparklingly brilliant that my productivity shoots through the floor." He follows on to criticize the repetitive nature of the whole affair with "After the first minute or so, nothing happens. We just go round and around on the same eight bar of well-mannered, polite synthpop. Oh sure, there's a breakdown section, but it's not particularly arresting and comes across as a transparent attempt to break things up and then drum up some interest in the return of that bassline again"

== Music video ==
Mirroring the single cover, the video shows Gardner singing while sitting and walking in a room full of mirrors, while finding a girl walking alone.

== Track listing ==
CD single

1. "I'm Not Mad"
2. "Superfree"

== Chart performance ==
Chart (2010)	Peak position
UK Singles (OCC)	44
Scotland (OCC)	21

== Release history ==
Region	Date	Format	Label
United Kingdom	28 March 2010	Digital download	A&M
United Kingdom	29 March 2010	CD single	A&M
