= You Bring Me Joy (Amelia Lily song) =

2012 debut single by Amelia Lily

Single by Amelia Lily
- Released: 9 September 2012
- Recorded: 2012
- Genre: Dance-rock
- Length: 3:51
- Label: Xenomania, Sony Music
- Songwriters: Annie Yuill, Brian Higgins, Carla Marie Williams, Fred Falke, Luke Fitton, Matt Gray, Miranda Cooper, Owen Parker, Toby Scott
- Producer: Xenomania

Amelia Lily singles chronology
"Wishing on a Star" (2011)	"You Bring Me Joy" (2012)	"Shut Up (And Give Me Whatever You Got)" (2013)

"You Bring Me Joy" is the debut single by British singer Amelia Lily. The song premiered on The Hits Radio on 7 July 2012 and was leaked online the following day. It was officially released in the United Kingdom on 9 September 2012 through Sony Music. The song was written by Annie Yuill, Brian Higgins, Carla Marie Williams, Fred Falke, Luke Fitton, Matt Gray, Miranda Cooper, Owen Parker, Toby Scott and produced by Xenomania.

== Critical reception ==
The song has received mostly positive reviews. Popjustice provided an early review on the song stating, "It’s brilliant. It’s obviously brilliant the first time you hear it and increasingly brilliant over the subsequent twenty or thirty listens". The Guardian was also positive towards the song, calling it a "sophisticated banger" which sees Lily's "impressive voice take centre stage." Digital Spy rated the song 4 out of 5 stars, adding; "'I'm not looking back when I've only just begun,' she growls over a propelling dance-rock riff, before calling out her contrary lover on a soaring yet wistful chorus. Like a PB&J sandwich the result won't initially be to everyone's taste, but it doesn't take long for addiction to set in.".

NME described it as "Atonal, generalised fury about the utterly mundane". Popjustice ranked "You Bring Me Joy" at number 27 on its "The Top 45 Singles of 2012" list, stating that they "instantly loved" the song, also saying that it was "the sort of thing we were hoping Cher’s comeback single would sound like".

== Commercial performance ==
"You Bring Me Joy" came out for digital downloads on 9 September 2012, one month later than its music video. The single reached number 1 on UK iTunes Chart on the first release day and stayed at the top for 4 days. It sold 50,000 copies on its first week, debuting at number 2 on the UK Singles Chart behind "Hall of Fame" by The Script and will.i.am. It was the second biggest debut single for a X Factor contestant in 2011 (behind Little Mix's "Wings"), and even bigger than One Direction's single "Live While We're Young" that debuted at number 3, three weeks later.

== Music video ==
Filming for the accompanying music video took place on 10 July 2012 in Los Angeles, California. The music video was uploaded onto Lily's official VEVO page on 30 July 2012. The video begins with Lily in the back of a vintage gold Mercedes in Los Angeles, reminiscing about a past love. Lily and her friends then stop by a service station and buy water guns. They jump back into the car and spray a man with the water guns who approaches them. All these scenes are intercut with Lily performing the lyrics, either on the hood of the Mercedes or in front of a beach. The ending sequence of the video takes place on the beach in the evening during a beach party in which Lily sings the closing lines of the song. The video reached 3,000,000 views on 15 October 2012. The video has been nominated for 'Best Video' at the 4Music Video Honours.

== Live performances ==
Lily sang her single for the first time live at the Birmingham ICC for the inaugural 'Nickelodeon Fruit Shoot Awards' on 21 July 2012. Lily posted an acoustic version of the song on her YouTube account on 24 August 2012, before the single release. She came back to G-A-Y club to promote "You Bring Me Joy" on 9 September 2012 and at the Gay Pride in Manchester. On 10 September 2012, she sang for Sun Biz Sessions, part of UK newspaper The Sun. And she also performed the song on This Morning on 13 September 2012, after it reached number one on mid week charts. Lily performed at the Girlguiding's Big Gig 2012 too, on 6 October and at the Bournemouth AIr Festival on the Corona Stage on 31 August. Later on 29 October was confirmed that Lily has joined the cast of Shrek the Musical for BBC Children in Need to perform on 14 November 2012.

== Track listing ==
Digital download

1. "You Bring Me Joy" – 3:51
2. "You Bring Me Joy" (Steve Smart & Westfunk club remix) – 5:27

== Credits and personnel ==
- Lead vocals – Amelia Lily
- Producers – Xenomania
- Lyrics – Annie Yuill, Brian Higgins, Carla Marie Williams, Fred Falke, Luke Fitton, Matt Gray, Miranda Cooper, Owen Parker, Toby Scott
- Label: Sony Music

== Charts ==
=== Weekly charts ===
Weekly chart performance for "You Bring Me Joy"
Chart (2012–2023)	Peak position
Czech Republic Airplay (ČNS IFPI)	77
Hungary (Rádiós Top 40)	2
Hungary (Single Top 40)	4
Ireland (IRMA)	21
Netherlands (Single Top 100)	67
Poland (Video Chart)	1
Russia Airplay (TopHit)	6
Scottish Singles Sales (Official Charts)	2
Slovakia Airplay (ČNS IFPI)	8
Slovenia (SloTop50)	28
UK Singles (Official Charts)	2
Ukraine Airplay (TopHit)	54

=== Year-end charts ===
2012 year-end chart performance for "You Bring Me Joy"
Chart (2012)	Position
Russia Airplay (TopHit)	95
UK Singles (OCC)	114

2013 year-end chart performance for "You Bring Me Joy"
Chart (2013)	Position
Hungary (Rádiós Top 40)	21
Russia Airplay (TopHit)	84
Ukraine Airplay (TopHit)	101

== Certifications ==
Region	Certification	Certified units/sales
United Kingdom (BPI)	Silver	200,000^{^}
^{^} Shipments figures based on certification alone.

== Release history ==
Region	Date	Format	Label
Ireland	7 September 2012	Digital download	Sony Music
United Kingdom	9 September 2012	Digital download	Sony Music
