= Don't Wanna Run No More =

Single by Vagabond

from the album You Don't Know the Half of It
- Released: 3 August 2009
- Genre: Pop; rock
- Length: 3:28
- Label: Geffen
- Producer(s): Xenomania

Vagabond singles chronology
"Sweat (Until the Morning)" (2009)	"Don't Wanna Run No More" (2009)	"I've Been Wanting You" (2009)

"Don't Wanna Run No More" is the second single by British band Vagabond. It was released on 3 August 2009, to be followed two weeks later by their debut album, You Don't Know the Half of It.

== Music video ==
The music video for the song premiered on YouTube on 19 June 2009. It has had over 70,000 views as of 18 August 2009. It shows the lead singer, Alex Vargas walking across a desert singing. Halfway through, the rest of the members appear with their musical instruments. It ends with Vargas and the rest of the band walking away.

== Track listing ==
CD single

1. "Don't Wanna Run No More"
2. "Don't Wanna Run No More" (Bimbo Jones Radio Edit)

== Chart performance ==
The single peaked at No. 41 on the UK Singles Chart on August 9, 2009.

Chart (2009)	Peak position
UK Singles Chart	41
