= Vagabond (British band) =

British band

- Origin: United Kingdom
- Genres: Pop, rock, soul
- Years active: 2008–2010
- Label: Polydor/Geffen Records
- Members: Alex Vargas; Luke Fitton; Sam Odiwe; Stephen Carter; Karl Penney

Vagabond were a UK band, signed to Geffen Records UK.

The band released their debut album, You Don't Know the Half of It on 17 August 2009. You Don't Know the Half of It was produced by Xenomania, who have previously worked with Girls Aloud, Sugababes, Cher, Gabriella Cilmi and Kylie Minogue. The Guardian featured Vagabond as "New Band of the Day" on 20 February 2009, and the newspaper also declared "They could be the world's biggest new band."

"Sweat (Until the Morning)" was released as the first single from the album as a free download on 8 June 2009, followed by "Don't Wanna Run No More" which was released on 3 August 2009. You Don't Know the Half of It was released on 17 August 2009.

Vagabond toured in the UK in 2009 and in addition to doing their own headline shows, supported artists such as James Morrison, McFly and the Script, and also performed at the Glastonbury, T in the Park and V music festivals in the UK. On 16 February 2010, the band announced they had split amicably.

== Band members ==
- Alex Vargas - vocals, acoustic guitar
- Luke Fitton - lead guitar, backing vocals
- Stephen Carter - rhythm guitar, backing vocals
- Sam Odiwe - bass
- Karl Penney - drums

== Discography ==
=== Albums ===
Title	Year	Peak chart position
Title	Year	UK
You Don't Know the Half of It	2009	27

=== Singles ===
Year	Title	Peak chart position	Album
Year	Title	UK	Album
"Sweat (Until the Morning)"	2009	—	You Don't Know the Half of It
"Don't Wanna Run No More"	2009	41	You Don't Know the Half of It
