= Shut Up (And Give Me Whatever You Got) =

2013 song by Amelia Lily

Single by Amelia Lily
- Released: 18 January 2013
- Recorded: 2012
- Genre: Electro-rock; synthpop
- Length: 3:36
- Label: Xenomania; Sony Music
- Songwriters: Brian Higgins; Luke Fitton; Tim Deal; Matt Gray; Miranda Cooper; Brooke X; Tim Powell; Toby Scott; Owen Parker; Joshua Jenkin
- Producers: Brian Higgins; Tim Powell

Amelia Lily singles chronology
"You Bring Me Joy" (2012)	"Shut Up (And Give Me Whatever You Got)" (2013)	"Party Over" (2013)

"Shut Up (And Give Me Whatever You Got)" is a song recorded by British singer Amelia Lily. It was released on 20 January 2013, as her second single, Lily revealed that the track was a stronger release compared to her debut, citing that the track highlighted her attitude, vocals and a representation as an artist. The song was written by Brian Higgins, Luke Fitton, Tim Deal, Matt Gray, Miranda Cooper, Brooke X, Tim Powell, Toby Scott, Owen Parker and Joshua Jenkin.

== Background ==
"Shut Up (And Give Me Whatever You Got)" was the first song Lily ever recorded in the studio. Behind the meaning of the track, Lily revealed; "I wanted to do a ‘girl power’ song, a basically girls could listen to it and be like ‘Yeah, I can stand up for myself, I’m a strong independent woman.’ That’s what I wanted to get out of this song was for girls to feel like they could relate to it." In late October 2012, she revealed to Yahoo! News the title of the single and said it was a lot darker than her previous single. On 2 November 2012, the single premiered via a lyric video which was uploaded to her official YouTube channel. The artwork for the single, which sees LiIy striking a pose, while an alternative black and white head shot of herself is placed over her face, was released on 12 December 2012.

== Critical reception ==
Robert Copsey of Digital Spy rated "Shut Up (And Give Me Whatever You Got)" three out of five stars, and added: "It may be a tad clunky around the edges, but her feistiness – like a tube of No More Nails – easily holds it together for the finish." Nick Levine of The Guardian described the track as a "stomping toddler of a pop song" and went on to compare it to a modern-day "post-EDM version of Holding Out For A Hero." However, Paul Leake of ClickMusic wrote a negative review calling the song "unconvincing" and "far beneath what Amelia's capable of". They went on to describe the track as "generic" and ended their review saying; "You'll find yourself glad when the end comes and that's a sad anti-climax. It's inoffensive, even catchy in the verses, but it does become maddening as the chorus repeats." NME wrote a negative review stating that the track made them "feel like a mad relic of a time before homogenized pop, adrift in a world of sticky floors and fluorescent shots."

== Music video ==
On 2 November 2012, Lily posted a lyric video on her official Vevo channel. Lily filmed the video for "Shut Up (And Give Me Whatever You Got)" on 19 October 2012. When describing the video, she stated,"There is a lot more attitude in there and it's a lot darker"; "The video is completely different to the first one and a lot of it was all my ideas so I'm excited." Part of the video is also filmed in East London, the same place where a scene of the 2008 film The Dark Knight was filmed. The video appeared on her official Vevo on 28 November 2012. The video features Lily performing the track at a dark, underground gig, while other scenes see her struggling to escape from corridors of glass. On 30 November 2012, a two-minute and twenty-two-second Behind the Scenes feature was uploaded to her official YouTube. On 14 January 2013, an acoustic version of the song was released on Lily's Vevo account.

=== Concept ===
The concept of the video was created by Lily herself after having a dream about it. Lily envisioned the video to have a nightmare atmosphere mixed with feelings of frustration, but also have vibes of fun.

== Live performances and promotion ==
Lily performed the track on 17 January 2013 edition of Celebrity Big Brother's Bit on the Side. Also on the same day, she performed the track on Blue Peter. On 18 January 2013, she performed an acoustic version of the single accompanied by a full band on Sam & Mark's Big Friday Wind-Up. She also appeared on Daybreak the same day, talking about the single and introducing the music video. On 20 January 2013, she performed the track at London nightclub, G-A-Y.

== Track listing ==
Digital download
No.	Title	Length
1.	"Shut Up (And Give Me Whatever You Got)"	3:12
2.	"Shut Up (And Give Me Whatever You Got)" (Wideboys Radio Mix)	3:36
3.	"Shut Up (And Give Me Whatever You Got)" (Almighty Radio Mix)	3:13

== Credits and personnel ==
- Lead vocals – Amelia Lily
- Producers – Brian Higgins, Tim Powell
- Lyrics – Brian Higgins, Luke Fitton, Tim Deal, Matt Gray, Miranda Cooper, Brooke Gengras, Tim Powell, Toby Scott, Owen Parker, Joshua Jenkin
- Label: Xenomania

== Charts ==
Chart (2013)	Peak position
Ireland (IRMA)	63
Scottish Singles Sales (Official Charts)	8
Slovakia Airplay (ČNS IFPI)	38
UK Singles (Official Charts)	11

== Release history ==
Region	Date	Format	Label
Ireland	18 January 2013	Digital download	Xenomania
United Kingdom	20 January 2013	Digital download	Xenomania
