= Amelia Lily =

English singer and television personality

Amelia Lily McQueen
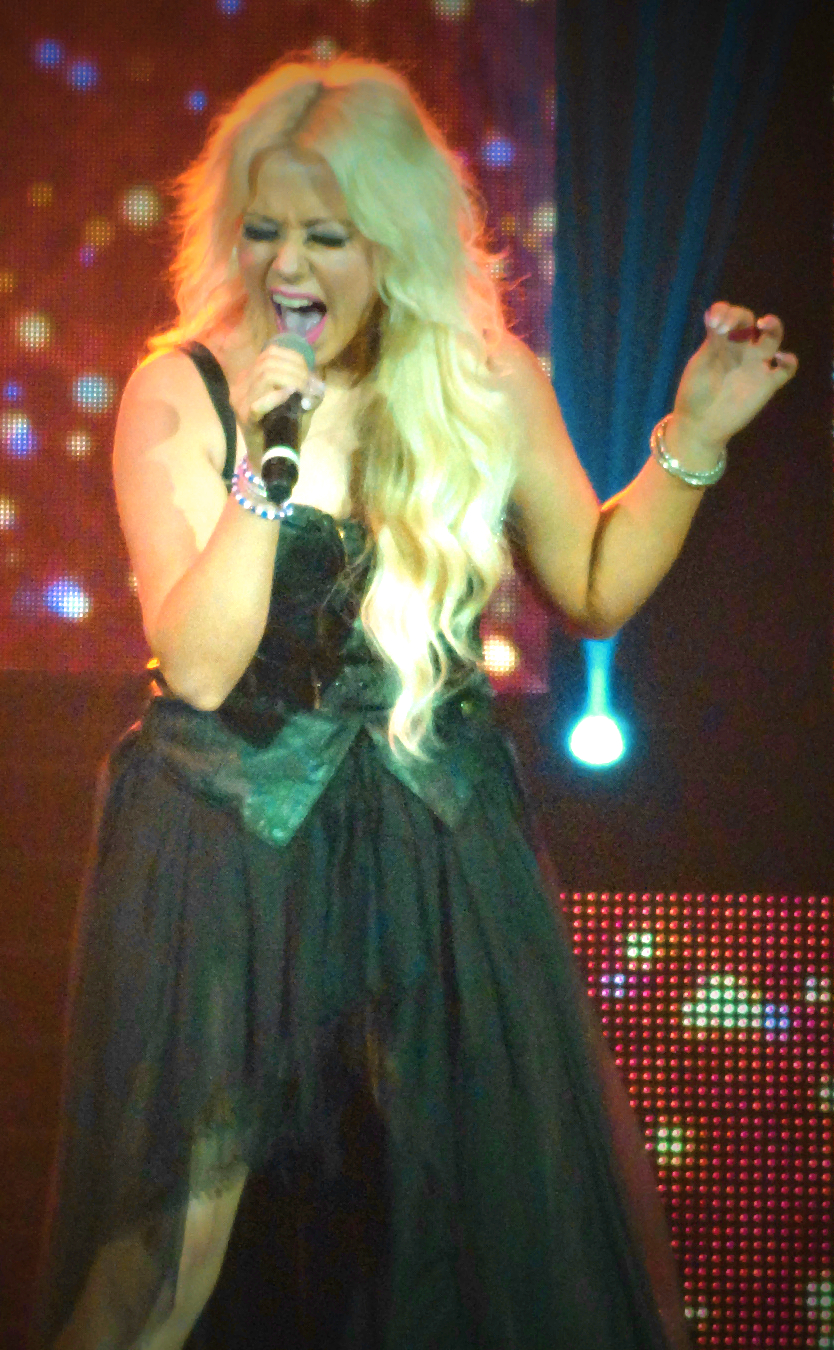
- Lily performing in 2012

Background information
- Born: Amelia Lily Oliver; 16 October 1994 (age 31); Nunthorpe, Middlesbrough, England
- Genres: Pop; dance-pop; pop rock
- Occupations: Singer; television personality
- Years active: 2011–present
- Labels: Xenomania; Sony; Warner
- Website: amelialily.com

Amelia Lily McQueen (née Oliver; born 16 October 1994) is an English singer and television personality. In 2011, she became a contestant on the eighth series of The X Factor, where she was the last contestant eliminated. In 2017, she finished as runner-up on the twentieth series of Celebrity Big Brother. In 2020, she began appearing in the MTV reality series Geordie Shore.

Following The X Factor, Lily signed a record deal with Sony, and released a single titled "You Bring Me Joy". The single peaked at number two on the UK Singles Chart, and number 21 in Ireland. Lily's follow up single, "Shut Up (And Give Me Whatever You Got)", charted at 11 on the UK Singles Chart. Lily's third single, "Party Over", peaked within the top 40 of the UK Singles Chart. In 2015, Lily joined the cast of American Idiot, in the lead role of Whatsername.

== Early life ==
The daughter of Aranka Bradley and Barry Horowitz, Amelia Lily Oliver was born in Nunthorpe, Middlesbrough on 16 October 1994. She was educated at Chandlers Ridge Primary School and Teesside High School. Lily began her musical career as a secondary school pupil by posting videos of herself singing on YouTube. Her cover of Adele's "Someone Like You" garnered over 1 million views. From the age of 13, she began writing songs with her guitar, and aspired to be a country singer. She was also a figure skater for 6 years during her childhood. She was also working on the tills at a garden centre in Nunthorpe. In a Sugarscape interview in August 2012, she revealed that she wanted to be a nun when she was younger.

== Career ==
In 2011, Lily auditioned for the eighth series of The X Factor in Liverpool in front of judges Louis Walsh, Gary Barlow, Kelly Rowland and Tulisa. She sang Erma Franklin's "Piece of My Heart" and won praise from all four judges. Barlow said, "...oh my goodness, 16 years old that was incredible. That absolutely lifted the top of this arena, well done. Amazing vocals. Amelia I am blown away..."

She progressed through to bootcamp and then to judges' houses, where she sang "E.T." by Katy Perry in front of Rowland and guest judge Jennifer Hudson. Lily made it to the live shows in Rowland's Girls category (solo females aged 16–24), alongside Misha B, Janet Devlin and Sophie Habibis. She performed "Billie Jean" on the first live show (Britain vs America). The judges loved her performance with Walsh saying, "Amelia, you deserve to be on that stage"; Barlow also gave her thumbs-up, commenting, "That was a really great opening to the show", but she was the first of Kelly's four girls to be eliminated from the show on 9 October by her mentor as there was no public vote in the first live show. After her surprise elimination, Lily continued to perform at clubs. Prior to the sixth live show, it was announced that Frankie Cocozza was removed from the show after breaking competition rules and that the public would be given the chance to reinstate one of the four contestants eliminated during the first live show. Lily was voted back into the competition after winning 48.8% of the vote, beating duo 2 Shoes, James Michael and Jonjo Kerr. Her comeback performance of "The Show Must Go On" received critical acclaim from all the judges. She was automatically put through to week 7 by the public vote.

In week 7, she sang "Think" by Aretha Franklin. Despite positive comments from the judges, she was in the bottom two with Craig Colton, and was saved after Barlow and Tulisa voted to send Lily home while Rowland and Walsh voted to send Colton home. The result went to deadlock for the first time in the series. Lily advanced to the quarter-final in week 8 while Colton was sent home. In the quarter-final, Lily again received critical acclaim from the judges for her two performances: "China in Your Hand" and "Since U Been Gone", with Barlow commenting that her first performance was "really nice to hear it sung in tune". She automatically advanced to the semi-final in week 9 by the public vote. In the semi-final, she performed Motown classic "Ain't No Mountain High Enough" and "I'm with You" to win her place in the final. The next night, she won a place in the show's final at Wembley Arena. Throughout the series, she topped the public vote twice and was in the bottom two only once before reaching the finals, where she sang "Ain't No Other Man" and performed "River Deep – Mountain High" alongside Rowland. Lily became the last contestant eliminated.

=== Performances on The X Factor ===
Episode	Song	Theme	Result
Audition	"Piece of My Heart"	Free choice	Advanced
Bootcamp 1	"You've Got the Love" (group performance)	Bootcamp challenge	Advanced
Bootcamp 2	"Nobody Knows"	Bootcamp songs	Advanced
Judges' houses	"E.T."	Free choice	Advanced
Judges' houses	"You and I"	Free choice	Advanced
Live show 1	"Billie Jean"	Britain vs America	Axed by Kelly Rowland; Eliminated
Return vote	N/A	N/A	1st (48.8%); Reinstated
Live show 6	"The Show Must Go On"	Lady Gaga vs Queen	1st (27.4%); Safe
Live show 7	"Think"	Movies	5th (11.3%); Bottom two
Results show 7	"You and I" (final showdown performance)	Save me song	Advanced to the quarter-final via deadlock
Quarter-Final	"China in Your Hand"	Guilty pleasures	1st (23.8%); Safe
Quarter-Final	"Since U Been Gone"	Musical heroes	1st (23.8%); Safe
Semi-Final	"Ain't No Mountain High Enough"	Motown	3rd (21.4%); Safe
Semi-Final	"I'm with You"	Song to get you to the final	3rd (21.4%); Safe
Final	"Ain't No Other Man"	Free choice	3rd (26.5%); Eliminated
Final	"River Deep – Mountain High" (with Kelly Rowland)	Mentor duet	3rd (26.5%); Eliminated

After Lily embarked on the X Factor Live Tour 2012 which took place in cities across the UK and Ireland, it was announced that she had signed a £500,000 record deal with Sony subsidiary Xenomania. In September 2012, she released her debut single, "You Bring Me Joy", which reached number one on iTunes following its release, eventually charting at number two in the UK. Her second single, "Shut Up (And Give Me Whatever You Got)", was released in January 2013, peaking at number 11 on the UK Singles Chart. Her third single, "Party Over", was released in April 2013 and reached number 40.

Her debut album was planned to be released on 29 April 2013, and was to be titled Be a Fighter. Lily described the album as featuring an eclectic range of genres—"There's a bit of dubstep on there as well which I think will surprise people! The sound is all over the place but I think the record works because we've only included songs that I really connected with." Lily announced in July 2013 that the album's release had been postponed to record new material for it as she wanted it to be "perfect". Be a Fighter appeared on online retailers later in 2013 with a new release date of 4 February 2014, but was subsequently taken down.

Lily was the support act for Girls Aloud's arena tour, Ten: The Hits Tour, participating from 21 February to 20 March 2013. Lily was also the main support act for Olly Murs's gig at the INTRO Festival. She also performed at Allstarz Summer Party at Madejski Stadium in Reading and later Chester Rocks at Chester Racecourse in June 2013, both of which were alongside Jessie J and Lawson.

In July 2014, Lily announced the release of a single titled "California" with Warner Music, due for release 7 September 2014. Lily released the music video for "California" on 25 July 2014. In 2016, a CD featuring the explicit version of "California" appeared online, including two new tracks, "The Best Of Me Yet (Greatest Night)" and "U Get Me".

In November 2014, it was announced that Lily would be replacing Marcus Collins in the UK tour of Joseph and the Amazing Technicolor Dreamcoat from February 2015. In May 2015, the London Evening Standard announced that Lily would be taking on the role of Whatsername when Green Day's American Idiot came to London.

In 2017, Lily competed in the twentieth series of Celebrity Big Brother. She left the house on Day 25 as the runner up behind Sarah Harding. Lily returned to the musical theatre stage in the 2017–2018 UK tour of Shrek the Musical in the role of Princess Fiona. In October 2019, it was announced that Lily had joined the cast of the MTV reality series Geordie Shore. In September 2022, Lily started hosting her own podcast called "The Talent Factory: Inside the Music Machine", on BBC Radio One.

== Artistry ==
Lily credits Pink as her major musical influence and idol. She also admires Kelly Clarkson, and cited her as her hero during The X Factor, singing one of her songs in the show's quarter final, "Since U Been Gone".

== Personal life ==
Lily is a Type 1 diabetic, having been diagnosed with the condition aged three. She is the half-sister of Any Dream Will Do's Lewis Bradley. Her father, John Barry Oliver, was the manager of Billingham Town. Lily and her partner, Eddie McQueen have a daughter, born in 2025.

== Discography ==
=== Singles ===
==== As lead artist ====
Year	Title	Peak chart positions				Certifications	Album
Year	Title	UK	IRE	NL	SCO	Certifications	Album
2012	"You Bring Me Joy"	2	21	67	2	BPI: Silver	Non-album singles
2013	"Shut Up (And Give Me Whatever You Got)"	11	63	—	8		Non-album singles
2013	"Party Over"	40	—	—	36		Non-album singles
2014	"California"	83	—	—	43		Non-album singles
"—" denotes single that did not chart or was not released.

==== As featured artist ====
Year	Title	Peak chart positions			Album
Year	Title	UK	IRE	SCO	Album
2011	"Wishing on a Star" (as part of The X Factor Finalists 2011 featuring JLS and One Direction)	1	1	1	Charity single
