= Party Over =

Single by Amelia Lily
- Released: 21 April 2013
- Recorded: 2013
- Genre: Drum and bass; power pop
- Length: 3:31
- Label: Xenomania; Sony Music
- Songwriters: Amelia Lily Oliver; Brian Higgins; Matt Gray; Miranda Cooper; Wayne Hector; Annie Yuil
- Producers: Brian Higgins; Xenomania

Amelia Lily singles chronology
"Shut Up (And Give Me Whatever You Got)" (2013)	"Party Over" (2013)	"California" (2014)

"Party Over" is a song recorded by British singer Amelia Lily. Written by Lily, Brian Higgins, Matt Gray, Miranda Cooper, Wayne Hector and Annie Yuil, and produced by Xenomania, It was released on 21 April 2013 and debuted at number 40 on the UK Singles Chart.

== Background ==
On 21 February 2013, Lily announced on Twitter that "Party Over" is to be released as her third single, She unveiled a 20-second teaser clip of the song on her official SoundCloud page. The single was available to pre-order on the iTunes store on 4 March 2013 and the lyric video was revealed on 6 March. Lily revealed during an interview that she heard the chorus of the track being made in the studio, ran upstairs into the guy's office and said she wanted to sing on it. She also said "I always knew it was going to be in the album, and I just thought it was a perfect time to release it just before the album." The single artwork, which is Lily jumping and shouting in black and white with an alternative colored picture in the background, was revealed by Lily via Twitter on 26 March.

== Critical reception ==
The song received mostly positive response. 4Music wrote a review stating that Lily sound "almost Rihanna-like in parts of the verses" and continued to praise her "powerful voice" which "belts out the words and proves that the party is far from over." From Digital Spy, Robert Copsey gave the track 3 out of 5 stars, which is a positive review, stating that "is certainly quirky, but it feels too soon to fully commit just yet." DirectLyrics wrote that the song is "amazing", and continued complementing saying that the song is "all about the club-dance beat blending to perfection with Amelia's energetic voice." The song was said to be similar to DJ Fresh's sound on "Hot Right Now" by Rita Ora. Eve Barlow from NME wrote a negative review of the song saying that "it's the production team [Xenomania]'s worst work to date".

== Commercial performance ==
"Party Over" debuted on the UK Singles Chart at number 40, selling 8,235 copies on its first week. The following week it dropped out of the Top 100 altogether. "Party Over" entered the singles chart in Scotland at number 36 on 4 May 2013. "Party Over" failed to chart in Ireland.

== Music video ==
The music video for 'Party Over' was shot in Los Angeles, California, on 30 January 2013. Lily released the music video on 6 March 2013. When talking about it she said that "the concept of the video is pretty simple really, it's a party. But it's not just a predictable party. The whole party is going back in time constantly through the video." The video starts with Lily dropping her mobile phone in the water while doing her make-up. Then, the video shows her phone changing the hours during the night, where she parties with her friends. During the party she jumps at the swimming pool, makes a tattoo on her arm, drinks, and plays video game. The video ends with her stepping on and breaking her phone. The video was directed by Travis Kopach. A three-minute "Behind The Scenes" video was released on 19 March 2013.

== Live performances ==
Lily started performing the song during Girls Aloud's Ten: The Hits Tour in which she was the opening act. She performed the song on This Morning on 26 April 2013. Lily performed the song at the MTV Live Session.

== Track listing ==
Digital download
No.	Title	Length
1.	"Party Over"	3:31
2.	"Party Over" (Seamus Haji Club Mix)	6:16
3.	"Party Over" (Andi Durrant & Steve More Club Mix)	6:26

== Charts ==
Chart (2013–15)	Peak position
Scotland Singles (OCC)	36
Slovakia Airplay (ČNS IFPI)	22
UK Singles (OCC)	40

== Release history ==
Region	Date	Format	Label
Ireland	19 April 2013	Digital download	Xenomania
United Kingdom	21 April 2013	Digital download	Xenomania
