= Devil's Got Your Gold =

Studio album by Frank
- Released: 7 August 2006
- Genre: Pop; R&B
- Length: 47:03
- Label: Polydor
- Producer: Brian Higgins; Xenomania

Professional ratings
Review scores
Source	Rating
Teentoday.co.uk	3/5 stars

Devil's Got Your Gold is the debut album by Frank, released on 7 August 2006, a week after the release of their debut single "I'm Not Shy". It features, amongst others, tracks featured in Frank's show Totally Frank on Channel 4's T4.

The album was recorded in Los Angeles in 2005. Seven of the tracks are co-written by Frank, alongside Brian Higgins and Xenomania, who also produced it. Tracks one and five were also covers of Xenomania's "vanity act" Mania.

The album was released in summer 2006, reaching a disappointing No. 110 on the UK Albums Chart. The album sold less than 900 copies in the UK and the group were subsequently dropped from their record label and split up.

== Track listing ==
1. "I'm Not Shy" (Miranda Cooper, Brian Higgins, Niara Scarlett, Giselle Sommerville, Lisa Cowling, Nick Coler) – 3:23
2. "Complicated" (Cooper, Higgins, Scarlett, Sommerville, Cowling, Jon Shave) – 3:54
3. "Closer to Me" (Cooper, Higgins, Sommerville, Coler) – 3:59
4. "Don't Wait Up" (Frank, Cooper, Higgins, Coler) – 3:54
5. "Money in My Pocket" (Cooper, Higgins, Scarlett, Sommerville, Cowling, Tim Powell) – 3:54
6. "If the Devil's Got Your Gold" (Frank, Cooper, Higgins, Tim "Rolf" Larcombe) – 4:58
7. "Turn It Up" (Frank, Cooper, Higgins, Larcombe, Shawn Lee) – 3:58
8. "All I Ever Do" (Frank, Cooper, Higgins, Coler, Powell, Paul Woods) – 3:58
9. "Silence" (Cooper, Higgins, Larcombe, Yusra Maru'e) – 3:14
10. "Never Left a Girl" (Frank, Cooper, Higgins, Larcombe) – 4:05
11. "Wake Up" (Frank, Cooper, Higgins, Coler) – 3:55
12. "Palm of Your Hand" (Frank, Cooper, Higgins, Coler, Powell, Lee) – 3:59

== Personnel ==
- Lauren Blake – vocals
- Bryony Afferson – guitar
- Helena Dowling – keyboards
- Hayley Angel Wardle – drums
