= I'm Not Shy =

"I'm Not Shy" is the only single from English girl group Frank, released in the UK on 31 July 2006. It was made available on CD and digital download. It was later included on Frank's only album, Devil's Got Your Gold.

"I'm Not Shy" was originally recorded by Mania, an act formed from part of the Xenomania songwriting team, and appeared on an album sampler. The song has since been used by Pett Productions in the television series Tittybangbang.

== Track listing ==
CD

- "I'm Not Shy"
- "Mr Beautiful" (non-album track)

== Video ==
The video was directed by British director Phil Griffin, and features the girls on photos that are being reproduced in an old fashioned dark room, showing them dressed up in the style of the 1930s and 1940s.

== Chart positions ==
- UK Singles Chart: number 40
- Irish Singles Chart: number 66
