= Frank (group) =

- Origin: London, England
- Years active: 2005–2006
- Labels: Polydor (2005–2006)
- Past members: Lauren Blake; Hayley Angel Wardle; Bryony Afferson; Helena Dowling
- Website: www.frankofficial.com

Frank was the girl group from Channel 4's comedy drama series Totally Frank. Frank consisted of lead singer Lauren Blake (born 1984), guitarist Bryony Afferson (born 1983), keyboard player Helena Dowling (born 1983) and drummer Hayley Angel Wardle (born 1983). In the show Totally Frank, the girls played fictional characters Tasha (Lauren), Charlie (Bryony), Flo (Helena) and Neve (Hayley). The band used their real names outside of the show.

Their debut single "I'm Not Shy" was released on 31 July 2006 and reached #40 in the UK Singles Chart. Their debut album Devil's Got Your Gold was released on 7 August 2006. The album featured tracks from the television show including "Money in My Pocket", "Never Left a Girl", "Silence", "Don't Wait Up", "All I Ever Do", the second series theme tune "Turn It Up", and the first series theme tune "Complicated". New tracks included "If the Devil's Got Your Gold", "Wake Up" and "Palm of Your Hand".

Their song, "I'm Not Shy" was featured in a comedy sketch on the show TittyBangBang on BBC Three.

The promo album sampler for Frank featured three tracks, "I'm Not Shy", "Turn It Up" and "Never Left a Girl".

Frank supported fellow girl group Girls Aloud on their 2006 Chemistry Tour of England and Scotland.

They were the last ever band to appear on a Saturday morning kids' show which was Holly & Stephen's Saturday Showdown on 1 July 2006, performing I'm Not Shy.

After the release of just one single and album, the band announced on 11 September 2006 that their record label had dropped them, and that they had parted ways.

Lauren is now acting; Helena is still doing music videos and carries on dancing; whilst Hayley carried on acting; and Bryony undertook some solo gigs before returning to acting.

== Discography ==
=== Albums ===
Year	Album	Peak chart position
Year	Album	UK
2006	Devil's Got Your Gold	110

=== Singles ===
Year	Title	Peak chart position		Album
Year	Title	UK	IRE	Album
2006	"I'm Not Shy"	40	66	Devil's Got Your Gold
