= TeenStar =

UK singing competition

- Genre: Music competition
- Begins: August
- Ends: January
- Frequency: Annually
- Locations: IndigO2, London and National Exhibition Centre, Birmingham, United Kingdom
- Years active: 14
- Inaugurated: 2013
- Most recent: Ongoing
- Participants: 9,000 annually
- Patron: Open Mic UK
- Website: www.teenstarcompetition.co.uk

TeenStar is a singing competition in the United Kingdom, it is run by Future Music. The competition is open for singers, vocalists and solo artists to enter either in their teenage or pre teen years. Participants compete in regional auditions to get the chance to perform at live music showcases to reach an annual national final. The first Grand Final in 2013 was held at the indigo at The O2 in London, and more recently at The NEC in Birmingham, The Beck Theatre in Hayes, and in 2019 the competition returned to The O2.

== Overview ==
The singing competition was originally devised by Chris Grayston in his capacity as CEO for Future Music. The first year saw over 9,000 applications. Entrants compete in a series of local and regional heats for a chance to perform at the National Grand Final at the IndigO2 within The O2 in London.

== Categories ==
Singers, rappers, groups, and acoustic singer/songwriters of all genres are accepted as competitors. The competition was previously divided into three age categories; pre-teens (12 years and below), mid-teens (13–15 years of age) and late teens (16 years old and over).

The categories are now pre-teens (12 and under) and teens (13 and over).

== Judging ==
Acts can perform either covers or their own original material live, and demos and recorded material are not accepted. Judges from the music industry, celebrities and record labels score all performances on the basis of vocal/musical talent, stage performance, star quality, and individuality, and the winning acts in the age categories must earn the most points from judges. There is also a point where the audience can vote in order to aid those in the judges' top scores to make it to the next round of the competition.

The judging panel that crowned Luke Friend 2013's winner included; former BBC Radio 1 DJ and Choice FM presenter Ras Kwame; four time Ivor Novello Awards winner and one half of the successful garage duo Artful Dodger (UK band) - Mark Hill (musician); Choice FM presenter E Plus; The X Factor's Jake Quickenden; Capital FM producer and celebrity journalist Jon Hornbuckle; editor of TeenStar partner Shout magazine Ali Henderson; Head of Baby Girl Music Michael King and Head of Future Music Chris Grayston.

== Prizes ==
In 2013, there was an overall prize pool of £20,000 throughout the competition including prizes at each regional stage of music lessons and recording studio time.

The main prize for 2013 was a cash prize of £5,000 for the winner to spend on advancing their music, plus a promotional package reportedly worth an additional £10,000 and an extensive consultation package provided by Future Music.

== Annual competitions ==
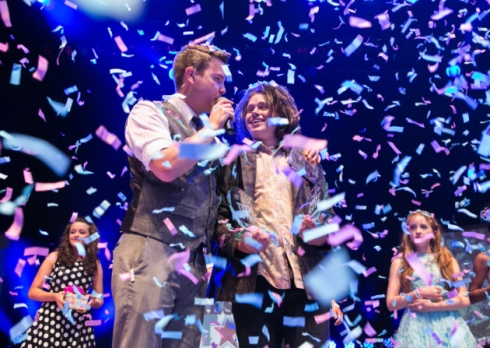
TeenStar 2013 winner Luke Friend

=== 2013 ===
The first TeenStar singing competition took place in 2013. After a series of localised and regional finals which took place around the UK including NEC, Sheffield City Hall and the Tyne Theatre in Newcastle, the National Grand Final took place at within The O2 in the IndigO2 in London.

Among the performers at the National Grand Final were Saffron Silva from Surrey and Michael Rice from Hartlepool who both got signed to BGM/Future Music. Other winners included overall competition runner-up SweetCheeks from Leigh-on-Sea, Essex. The pre-teen age category winner was Chloe Wealleans from Northumberland, the runner-up was Harlee from Warrington, Cheshire and third place was Musty from Enfield, London. The mid-teen age category winner was SweetChix, with the runner-up being Michael Rice and third place going to Emily Middlemas from Glasgow. The late-teen age category runner-up was Bud from Mansfield, Nottinghamshire. Michael Rice was later to feature on The X Factor and SweetChix got to the final of the ITV's series 8 of Britain's Got Talent.

The 17-year-old singer/songwriter Luke Friend won both the late teens and the overall competition. He performed his own song at the competition called "Fame of the unfortunate girl" in front of a sellout 2,500 people, both singing and playing guitar. He won a cash prize of £5,000, which he used to purchase studio time to record his album in River Studios in Southampton where Birdy also first recorded her album before being signed to Warner.

Since winning TeenStar, Luke Friend has gone on to enjoy further fame through the UK TV series The X Factor eventually coming third to overall winner Sam Bailey.

=== 2014 ===
The 2014 National Grand Final took place at The NEC in Birmingham and after coming third in the previous year Emily Middlemas took the title. Emily has been entering Future Music singing competitions since the age of 8 and has progressed to more National Grand Finals than any other act in Future Music history. Emily has appeared in National Grand Finals including Open Mic UK, Live and Unsigned and TeenStar on no less than 5 occasions.

In a similar journey to Luke Friend in the previous year, Emily then starred in the UK TV series The X Factor and made it to the judges' houses.

Other winners included pre-teens winner Jake McKechnie from Wigan and late teens winner Victoria Bass from Folkestone; but it was mid teens winner Emily Middlemas singing her original song "Goodnight kiss" who won the overall title. Many of the placed acts were picked up by Syco and featured on The X Factor.

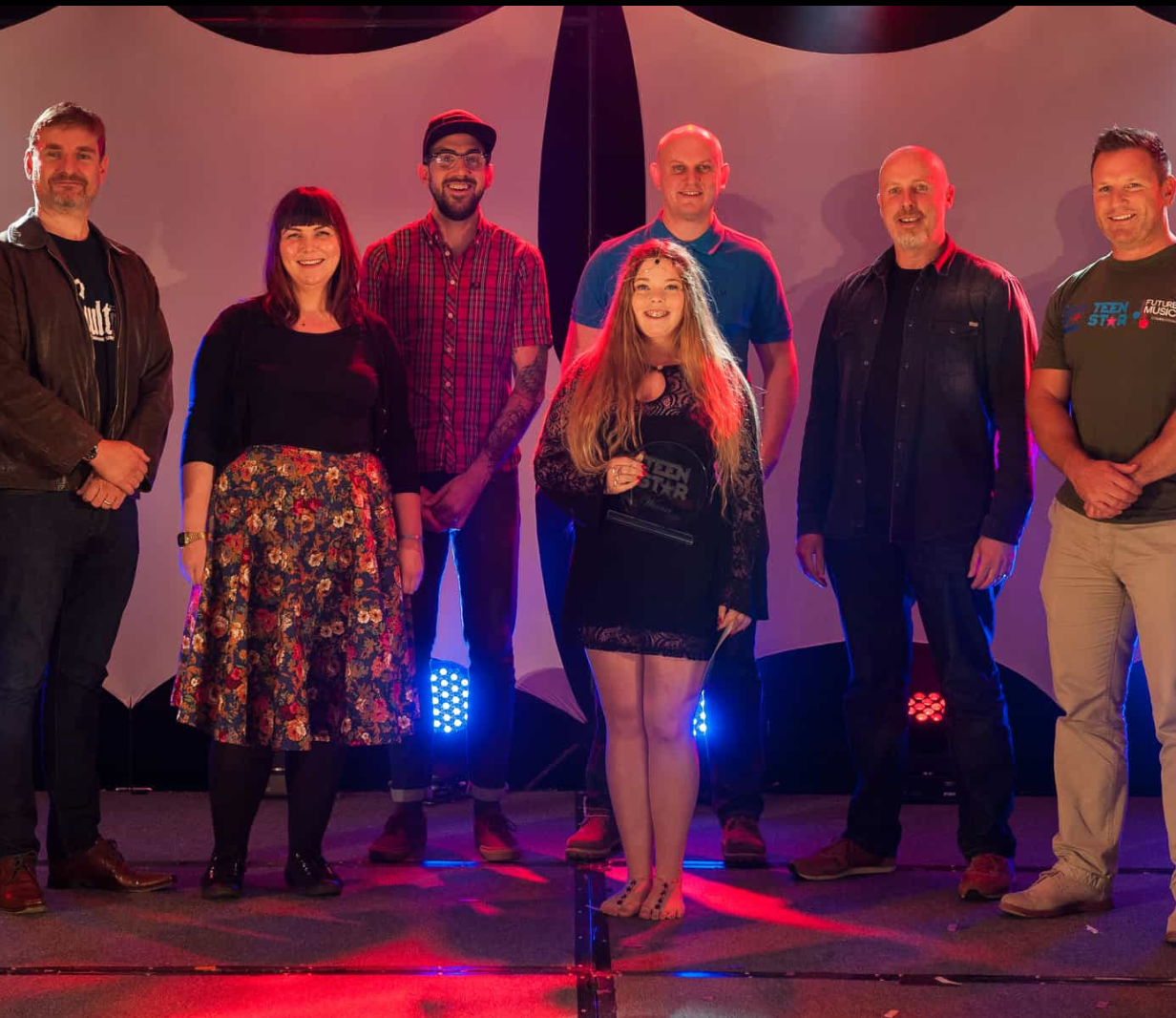
Rachel Ann Stroud

=== 2015 ===
The 2015 National Grand Final again took place at the National Exhibition Centre (The NEC) in Birmingham on 25 July and the overall winner was Rachel Ann Stroud from the mid-teens category with a striking version of "Wicked Game" by Chris Isaak. Rachel, hailing from Bournemouth, won with 115 marks. Second in the mid teens category was Tasha Jerawan from Cannock and Talis Eros from South Wales came third.

The pre teens category was won by Breeze Redwine with an original song, "Here Alone", Breeze gaining 122 points in the Final. Second place went to Tazmin Barnes from Tewkesbury and third place to Evan from Shoebury.

Late teens winner Eli scored 122 marks with her original song "About You". Eli, from Bromley, was ahead of Georgia from London in second and We!Are from Hanwell in third place.

Judges included four time Ivor Novello award winner Mark Hill, James Meadows (A&R from Universal Music), Andy Baker (Music Manager from Resound Media), Rock School's Stuart Slater, Editor in Chief of Shout magazine Laura Brown and head of Future Music Chris Grayston. For the pre teen category Dutch Van Spall from Big Help Management replaced James Meadows.

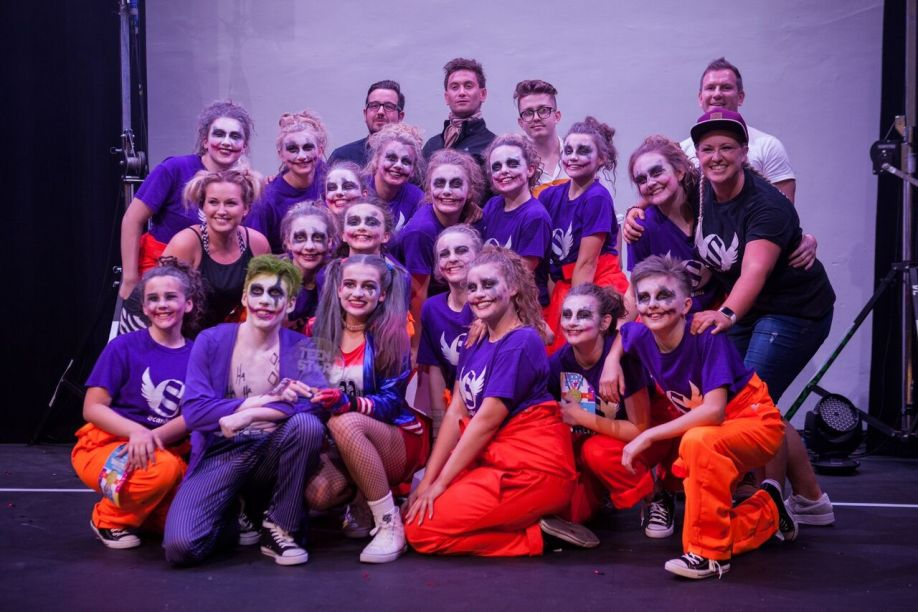
TeenStar winners 2017 Scandalous Productions

=== 2017 ===
In the 2017 competition Grand Final, singer Annabel and dance group Scandalous Productions were crowned champions in front of a capacity crowd and a professional industry judging panel at The Alban Arena in St Albans. Annabel's original song called "Nightmares", and Scandalous Productions' original "Why So Serious" dance routine, won over the competition industry judges making them the overall TeenStar winners for each category.

The pre teens category was won by Brooke Burke and Slay3rZ, in the singing and dance category, respectively. Late teens winner in the singing category was Roadstead and Katy Smith won best late-teen dance.

The Grand Final was professional filmed as all Grand Finalists featured on Showcase TV on Sky TV in a special one-off show.

Judges included professional dancer and choreographer Ryan Jenkins, Swoosh from Flawless Dance Group, Tom Lightfoot, Talent Producer for The X Factor and Britain's Got Talent, James Ellett from Modest Management, who manage artists such as One Direction, Little Mix and Olly Murs. Natalie Shay Open Mic UK winner and award-winning singer songwriter artist, Truchio Powell and head of Future Music Chris Grayston.

=== 2018 ===
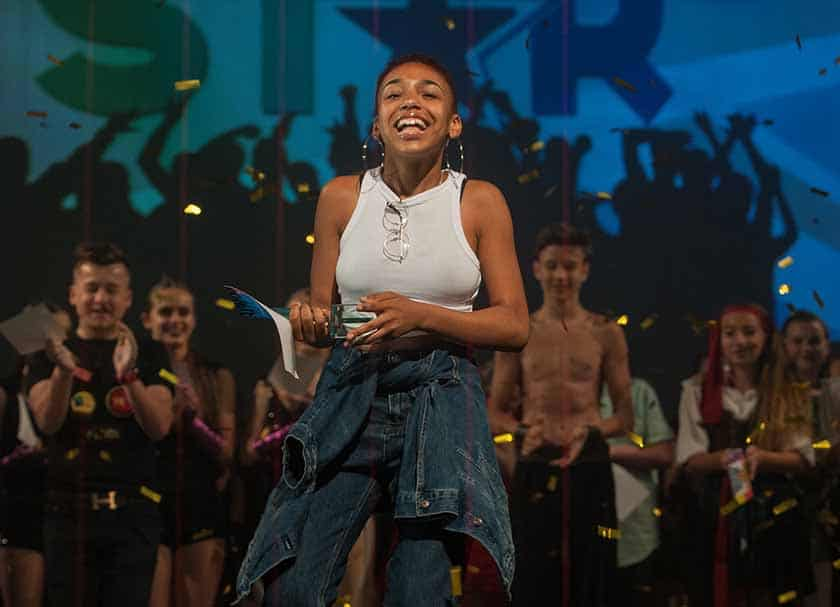
2018 TeenStar winner Acacia K

The national singing and dance competition TeenStar 2018 Grand Final took place on Saturday 14 July at The Beck Theatre, in Hayes, and gave acts the chance to perform in front of a massive crowd and industry judging panel.

Joining a long line of competition winners, Acacia K was crowned the champion for the singing category and DN12 were crowned the champion for the dance category.

Judges included previous winners Scandalous Dance, Swoosh from Flawless Dance Group, Barney Addison, Head of Talent at SYCO Entertainment, Leon Haynes from Polydor Record and head of Future Music Chris Grayston.

=== 2019 ===
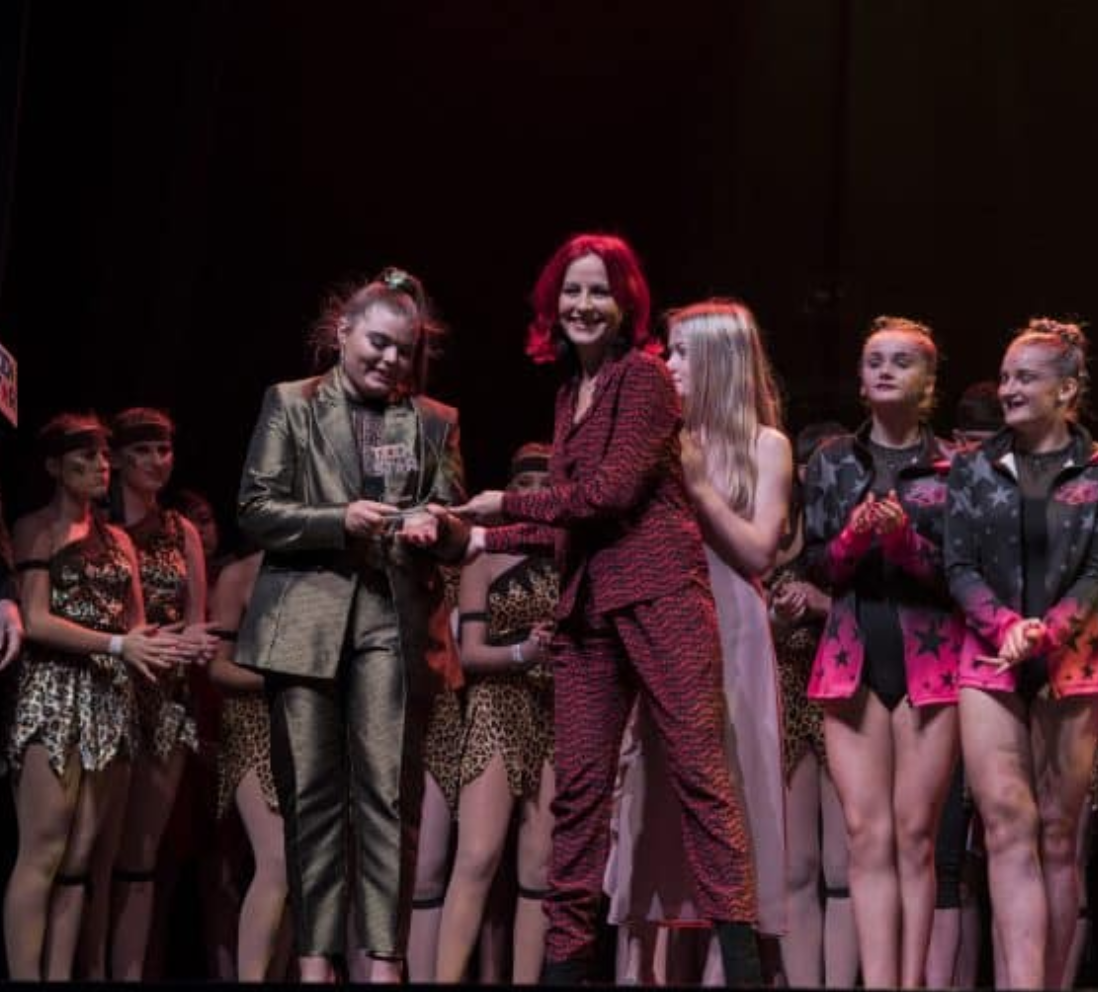
TeenStar 2019 winner Teah

The 2019 TeenStar Grand Final took place on Saturday February 1 at indigo at The O2 in London.

Teah won the singing category and the group Sophie's Studio, Gun Control? took the prize for dancing, both winning over the competition industry judges making them the overall TeenStar winners for each category.

The overall singing winner and won: production of her album in one of the UK's finest recording studios, River Studios, working with a top producer on her songs. Teah will also receive a fully produced video of the single of her choice, an initial extensive winner's publicity package consultation and development package, a social media revamp, and access to industry contacts, plus a one to one vocal technique session with celebrity vocal coach CeCe Sammy.

The overall dance winners won a cash prize of £2,500, a fully produced video of the performance of their choice, promotional photo shoot by one of the UK's best photographers and an initial extensive winner's publicity package (previous winners coverage includes BBC and ITV television, Mojo and Q magazines and more).

Judges included BAFTA award-winning broadcaster, vocal coach and advocate Carrie Grant, Daniel Gardner from Evolved Artists Management, singer, songwriter and producer Suzanna Dee Singer, Leon Haynes from Polydor Record and head of Future Music Chris Grayston.

=== 2020 ===
The entire 2020 series was online and international, with Frankie Cena as the host. The judges for the competition were BAFTA award-winning broadcaster, BBC1 presenter, vocal coach, session singer and advocate Carrie Grant, A&R for Sony, Thames TV and Future Music Chris Grayston, A&R of Polydor Records (Universal Music) Leon Haynes and vocal coach and founder of Vocal Ovation Julie Miles.

From thousands of entries received, successful contestants performed in the Online Audition Shows starting 25 June 2020, followed by four Live Shows which commenced on 3 September 2020. There were a further two Semi Final shows, followed by the Grand Final on 26 November.

The Results Show was streamed live on 2 December 2020, and Saffron Rococo was selected as the overall TeenStar 2020 Champion.

=== 2021 ===
A new 2021 season has been announced with auditions to be held soon.

== Overall winners ==
| Date | Grand Winner | Pre-Teens | Mid-Teens | Late-Teens |
|---|---|---|---|---|
| 2013 | Luke Friend | Chloe Weallans | Sweet Cheeks | Luke Friend |
| 2014 | Emily Middlemas | Jake McKechnie | Emily Middlemas | Victoria Bass |
| 2015 | Rachel Ann Stroud | Breeze Redwine | Rachel Ann Stroud | Eli |
| 2017 | Annabel | Brooke Burke | Annabel | Roadstead |
| 2018 | Acacia K | Joslyn Plant | Acacia K | Phoebe Nolan |

Dance Category Winners

| Date | Grand Winner | Pre-Teens | Mid-Teens | Late-Teens |
|---|---|---|---|---|
| 2017 | Scandalous Productions | Slay3rZ | Scandalous Productions | Katy Smith |
| 2018 | DN12 | Kaitlyn Smith | Samantha Jane Performing Arts | DN12 |

2019 Category Winners

| Date | Singing Winner | Dance Winner | 12 & under | 13 & over |
|---|---|---|---|---|
| 2019 | Teah | Sophie's Studio, Gun Control? | Embrace | Teah |

== Judging panels ==
- Chris Grayston (2008–present)
- Carrie Grant (2019–present)
- Ras Kwame (2010–present)
- Leon Haynes (2016–present)
- Cece Sammy (2014–present)
- Alex Baker (2014–present)
- James Ellet (2015–present)
- Barney Addison (2015–present)
- Laurence Hobbs (2015–present)
- Layla Manoochehri (2014–present)
- Julie Miles (2018–present)
- Suzanna Dee (2018–present)
- Kathryn-Ann Key (2019–present)
- Sam Fraser (2019–present)
- Michael King (2013)
- E Plus (2013)
- Simon Keegan (2013)
- Jake Quickenden (2013)
- Jon Hornbuckle (2013)
- Ali Henderson (2013)
- Gareth Henderson (2014)
- Cece Sammy (2014)
- James Meadows (2014–15)
- Dutch Van Spall (2015)
- Laura Brown (2015)
- Stuart Slater (2015)
- Andy Baker (2015)

== See also ==
- Live and Unsigned
- Live Fest
- Chris Grayston
- Open Mic UK
