= Must Be the Music =

- Genre: Reality
- Presented by: Fearne Cotton
- Judges: Jamie Cullum; Sharleen Spiteri; Dizzee Rascal
- Voices of: Peter Dickson
- Country of origin: United Kingdom
- No. of series: 1

Production
- Production company: Princess Productions

Original release
- Network: Sky1
- Release: 15 August – 19 September 2010

Must Be the Music is a British television musical talent competition contested by aspiring singers and musicians drawn from public auditions. The show is a music competition and reality show that was broadcast in the United Kingdom and Ireland. Auditions were held in Edinburgh, Manchester, London and also held in Ireland. The show began airing in August on Sky1, and was also simulcast in HD. Fearne Cotton presented the show. The first and only series was won by Emma's Imagination, a female singer from Dumfries.

The winning act received £100,000 to help kick-start their music career. In the initial televised audition phase as well as the three semi-finals and final, contestants sang in front of the judges – Jamie Cullum, Sharleen Spiteri and Dizzee Rascal. Among the notable artists competing in the show were Irish fiddler Daithí Ó Drónaí and The Trinity Band, who went on to win Live and Unsigned in 2011.

The show was broadcast on Sky1. Must Be the Music was devised as a spin-off for the highly successful Got to Dance, which finished its first series in February. The live finals were held at Wembley Arena. Must Be the Music had a live audience behind the judges. During the live finals, the public voted for their favourite act, which they wished to keep in the competition.

== Format ==
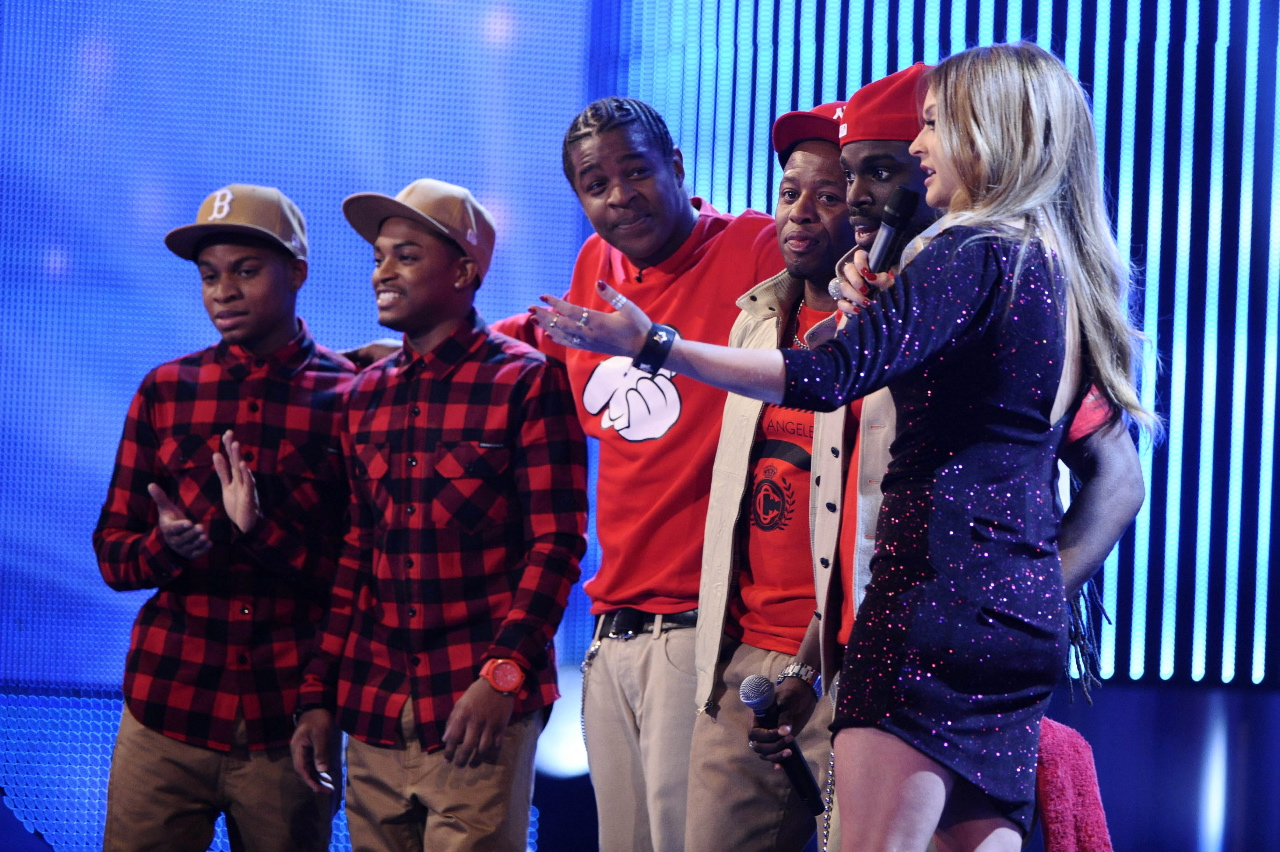
Host Fearne Cotton (right) onstage with The Trinity Band

The auditions took place in early August 2010 in front of the three celebrity judges. Unlike X-Factor which limits itself only to singers, Must Be the Music was open to all musicians, who were allowed to play their own compositions. Fearne Cotton described the show as "It's about acts who can sing, play... or do both!"

The audition process culminated in the judges selecting 15 acts for the semi-finals which took place at the Fountain Studios in Wembley (which is also used for The X Factor). Each semi-final had five acts with a five-minute voting window at the end of the show to decide which two acts from each semi-final proceeded to the final, which took place on 19 September at Wembley Arena.

The winner of the show received a £100,000 cash fund rather than a record contract with an emphasis on giving the acts control over their careers. Additionally, every song performed on the show was available to download from iTunes and Sky Songs with 100 per cent of the net profits of the songs and merchandise going to the musicians. A case at the High Court in February 2014 established that the format was not copied from a proposal from another company.

== Semi-finalists ==
| Act | Members | Description |
|---|---|---|
| Chakula Soul | Shanice Smith, Vocals Fidel Lea, Guitar / vocals Christina Hizon, Keyboard and vocals Max Coghlan, Drummer Whitnie Parkes, Vocals Beatrice Anderson, Vocals Ben Soan, Bass Ben Lochrie, Guitar | Chakula Soul, meaning 'food for the soul' in Swahali, are a Hip Hop Soul R’n’B band made up of eight musicians who all attend BRIT school, one of the UK's best known Performing Art Schools. |
| CK Gospel Choir | Harlano Weekes, Director / singer Scarlet Gabriel, Singer Cathy Murphy, Singer, Tremaine Dawkins, Singer, Sheyi Martins, Singer, Adeola Ranson, Singer, Junior Abanulo, Singer, Brian Ingram, Keyboard, Malika Wilson-Muir, Singer, Hannah Ledwidge, Drummer Laura Edwards, Singer, Sarah Blake, Singer, Lawrence Insula, Bass, Michael Jablonka, Guitarist, T.J. Weekes, Singer | CK Gospel Choir sing soul, gospel, pop, jazz and classical, putting a gospel twist on all their performances. Their unique approach means there is no one lead vocalist; all 15 singers take it in turns to lead by splitting songs into solo verses. |
| Daithí | Daithí O Dronaí | Violinist Daithí O Dronaí combines his fiddle and a recording loop station to create distinctive sounds for his music. Performing entirely solo with no pre-recorded tracks, Daithí creates looped sounds like tapping his violin as a drumbeat and even uses his Nintendo DS to get distinctive sounds. |
| Ebony Steel Band | Pepe Francis Steve Lewis, Kayleigh Lewis, Carlene Etienne, Joshua Prescod, Cerise Edwards-Lynch, Ashley George, Ashley Bullard, Navina Nallamuthu, Richard Coutain, Darren Francis, Anthony Francis, Samuel Dubois, Delphina James, Patrick Holder, Jerome Witter | Starting life in a garden shed 40 years ago, the 15-strong Ebony Steel Band have performed all over the world. Part of the Princes' Trust, the band regularly play in front of the Queen and received her Unsung Heroes Award for the work they do in the community. |
| Emma's Imagination | Emma Gillespie | 27-year-old Singer/Songwriter Emma spends her days filling the streets of Glasgow with her quirky voice, melancholic verse and acoustic guitar Not to be confused with Emma Gillespie of The Missive |
| Flow Dem | Mason (Mdot), Anton (Antizzle), Raymond (Lil Ray), Carvell (Lil C), Michael (MK) | Grime Band- Flow Dem Have already performed in front of 2000 people at Fashion Wales Live and been the support for MC Skepta on stage. |
| Hero | Hero | 11-year-old Harpist and Singer Hero has already earned enough from busking to record her own album. |
| Kyle | Kyle | Kyle taught himself to play piano by watching YouTube videos |
| Legion of Many | Jeremy Goddard Mark Goddard, Mike Morgan, Tom Vincer, Gabriel Wetz, Peter Atkinson, Kesty Morrison, Gemma Alexander | Legion of Many have an electro dance sound and an eclectic set of costumes |
| Missing Andy | Rob, Alex, Steve, Elliot, John | Five man group Missing Andy are a true British band who have performed alongside the Pigeon Detectives and The Wombats at South by Southwest Festival in Texas after R.E.M pulled out. |
| Pepper & Piano | Katie Pepper, Singer; Emma Alkazraji, Pianist . | |
| The Pictures | Johnny Mallet, Lead Singer, Josh Catling, Drummer, Max Baillie, Violin, Harry Peirson, Guitar, Luke Fitton, Bass | The Pictures' music has a unique sound that uses an electric violin to harmonise with the lead guitar, creating a 'bigger, more versatile sound'. |
| Toxic Funk Berry | Dom Berditch, Drummer, Joe Berditch, Bass / keyboard, computer, Jonny Wharton (aka Jonny Falls Over), Guitarist / keyboard, computer | LIVE Electronic Dance Music, Breaks, Dubstep, Drum and Bass. The trio have since re-branded as 'Concrete Disco'. |
| The Trinity Band | Craig Dawkins, Keyboard, James Dawkins, Drums, Pete Sharpe, Bass, Dwaine Hayden, Singer, Culture (Obe) Watson, Rapper & Musical Director | Urban Group. Their live vibrant music is about creating positivity and appeals to a wide variety of culture and ages. |

== Songs and dates performed ==
| Act | Song Performed | Date | Finalist? |
|---|---|---|---|
| Chakula Soul | "Love Goodbyes" | 2010-08-29 | No |
| CK Gospel Choir | "Lovely Day" | 2010-09-12 | No |
| Daithí | "Carraroe" | 2010-08-29 | Yes |
| Ebony Steel Band | "Don't Stop the Music" | 2010-09-05 | No |
| Emma's Imagination | "This Day" | 2010-09-05 | Yes |
| Flow Dem | "Get What I Want" | 2010-08-29 | No |
| Hero | "Swept Away" | 2010-09-12 | Yes |
| Kyle | "Red" | 2010-09-05 | No |
| Legion of Many | "Now We Are Stars" | 2010-08-29 | No |
| Missing Andy | "Sing for the Deaf" | 2010-09-12 | Yes |
| Pepper & Piano | "You Took My Heart" | 2010-08-29 | Yes |
| The Pictures | "Tears" | 2010-09-05 | Yes |
| Toxic Funk Berry | "Day & Night" | 2010-09-12 | No |
| Trinity Band | "This Must Be Love" | 2010-09-05 | No |

== Released singles ==
| Show | Artist | Single | Peak chart positions | | | |
| Show | Artist | Single | UK | UK IND | IRL | SCO |
|---|---|---|---|---|---|---|
| Semi-final 1 | Chakula Soul | "Love Goodbyes" | – | 34 | – | – |
| Semi-final 1 | Daithí | "Carraroe" | 67 | 6 | 24 | – |
| Semi-final 1 | Flow Dem | "Get What I Want" | 72 | 8 | – | – |
| Semi-final 1 | Legion of Many | "Now We Are Stars" | 98 | 11 | – | – |
| Semi-final 1 | Pepper & Piano | "You Took My Heart" | 7 | 1 | 9 | 6 |
| Semi-final 2 | Ebony Steele Band | "Don't Stop the Music" | – | – | – | – |
| Semi-final 2 | Emma's Imagination | "This Day" | 10 | 2 | 9 | 7 |
| Semi-final 2 | Kyle | "Red" | 130 | 15 | – | – |
| Semi-final 2 | Pictures | "Tears" | 33 | 6 | 45 | 27 |
| Semi-final 2 | Trinity Band | "This Must Be Love" | 194 | 23 | – | – |
| Semi-final 3 | CK Gospel Choir | "Lovely Day" | – | – | – | – |
| Semi-final 3 | Hero | "Swept Away" | 131 | 19 | – | – |
| Semi-final 3 | Missing Andy | "Sing for the Deaf" | 36 | 8 | – | – |
| Semi-final 3 | Toxic Funk Berry | "Day & Night" | – | 27 | – | – |
| Final | Daithí | "Ci" | 131 | 20 | – | – |
| Final | Emma's Imagination | "Focus" | 7 | 1 | 8 | 5 |
| Final | Hero | "Angel" | – | – | – | – |
| Final | Missing Andy | "The Way We're Made (Made in England)" | 38 | 7 | – | – |
| Final | Pepper & Piano | "One of These Days" | 63 | 14 | – | – |
| Final | The Pictures | "Earthly Treasures" | 43 | 10 | – | – |

== Polish version ==
From March 2011 the first edition of the program, titled Must Be the Music. Tylko muzyka, has been broadcast by Polish TV station Polsat. The show became very successful among the audience with approximately three million viewers each season and by 2016 was running its eleventh edition. The first Polish winner, Enej band, achieved great commercial success that added to the show's popularity. Numerous Polish artists launched their careers through the program, such as LemON, Red Lips, Oberschlesien, Marcin Patrzalek, Tune or Shata QS. On 8 May 2016, after the final of the show's eleventh edition, the show was canceled by Polsat.

== See also ==
- Britain's Got Talent
- Fame Academy
- Got to Dance
- Pop Idol
- The Voice UK
- The X Factor
