= The Trinity Band =

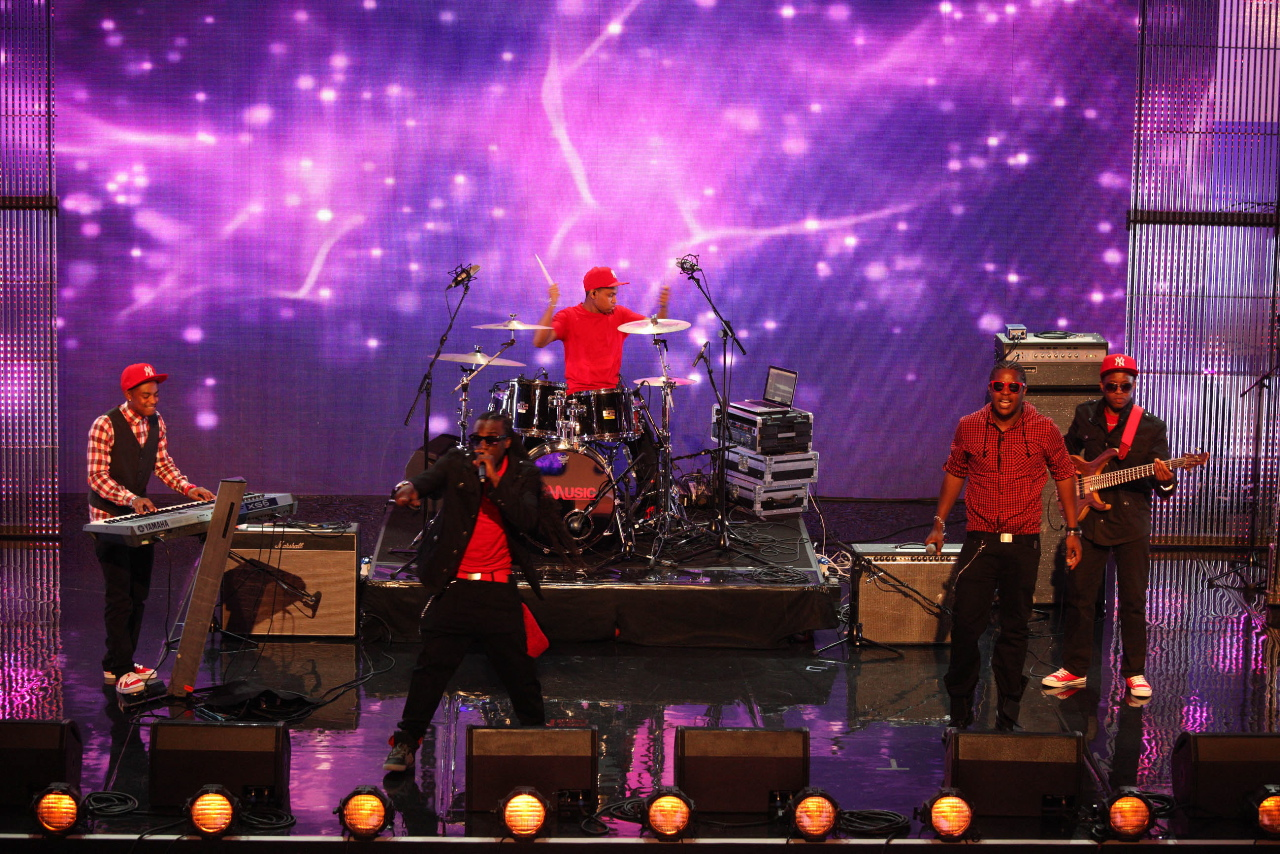
- Performing at Must Be The Music in 2010

Background information
- Origin: Derby, England
- Genres: Hip Hop, Soul, R & B
- Years active: 2004–12, 2014–
- Label: Future Music Management
- Members: Dwaine Hayden; Obe "Rukus" Watson; Craig Dawkins; James Dawkins; Pete Sharpe
- Website: www.TheTrinityBand.com

The Trinity Band (aka TTB) is a five-piece musical group founded in 2004 from Derby, England. The band consists of Rukus (rapper), Dwaine Hayden (singer), Craig Dawkins (keyboards), James Dawkins (drums) and Pete Sharpe (bass). Trinity performed at the 2019 World Youth Day, an event for young people organized by the Catholic Church that reportedly drew 600,000 people to Panama City, Panama.

In May 2010 the band was a semi-finalist on Sky1's televised music competition Must Be The Music, where they performed the original single "This Must Be Love." The single was officially released on 7 September 2010. On 23 July 2011 The Trinity Band was chosen as the overall winner of the Live and Unsigned music contest.

== Founding ==
The Trinity Band formed in 2004 after cousins James and Craig Dawkins met founding member and rapper Obe Watson (nicknamed Rukus) at a musical church workshop he was facilitating. The group soon recruited singer Dwaine Hayden and bassist Pete Sharpe. They began writing and performing a combination of R & B, hip hop, and soul.

=== Member histories ===
All of the members began practising music at a young age, with all except Rukus first performing music at church. Craig Dawkins self-taught himself how to play keyboards, and also plays saxophone. He has worked with a number of national and international musicians. His cousin James plays drums, and prior to joining The Trinity Band he completed a BTEC National Diploma in Music Technology. James has worked with a variety of gospel musicians.

Dwaine Hayden began singing in church at age 7. By 15 he was pursuing vocal training and was performing under the alias D. Wizzy as part of the musical duo Double V with his friend Graham Taylor. Independently, Hayden won an international competition to complete the Usher master class, and his songs have had airplay on radio stations such as BBC Radio 1Xtra and Galaxy. His version of the song "I'm Sorry" lead to performances of the track across the UK and a music video.

Bassist Pete Sharpe had his first studio experience at 11, recording an album on bass with Jamaican artists. He later played keys in his late teens, began writing and producing, and formed the band No Limits, which released the underground soul single "Missing You." He was a resident DJ in clubs in Derby and Birmingham. He later formed his own production company. He has worked with artists such as Kelli Young of Liberty X and Sway.

Rukus began as a professional DJ and producer from Birmingham, first breaking into the scene by hosting his own weekly mix show. The show led to him being a resident DJ in locations such as Dubai and Geneva, where he was known as DJ Rukus. He played alongside DJs such as Trevor Nelson and Dane Bowers. Rukus' first single "Let It Go" was released in late 2005, and became popular on various UK radio stations, including BBC Radio 1 and BBC Radio 1Xtra. In 2006, he, Yogi, and Shade 1 released their debut album Ants Dem a Swarm under the name Antourage. His debut mixtape Originality Stands Alone was released in 2007, which featured 50 tracks. He has also toured with Mark Ronson after being featured in a popular Ronson remix.

== Early history ==
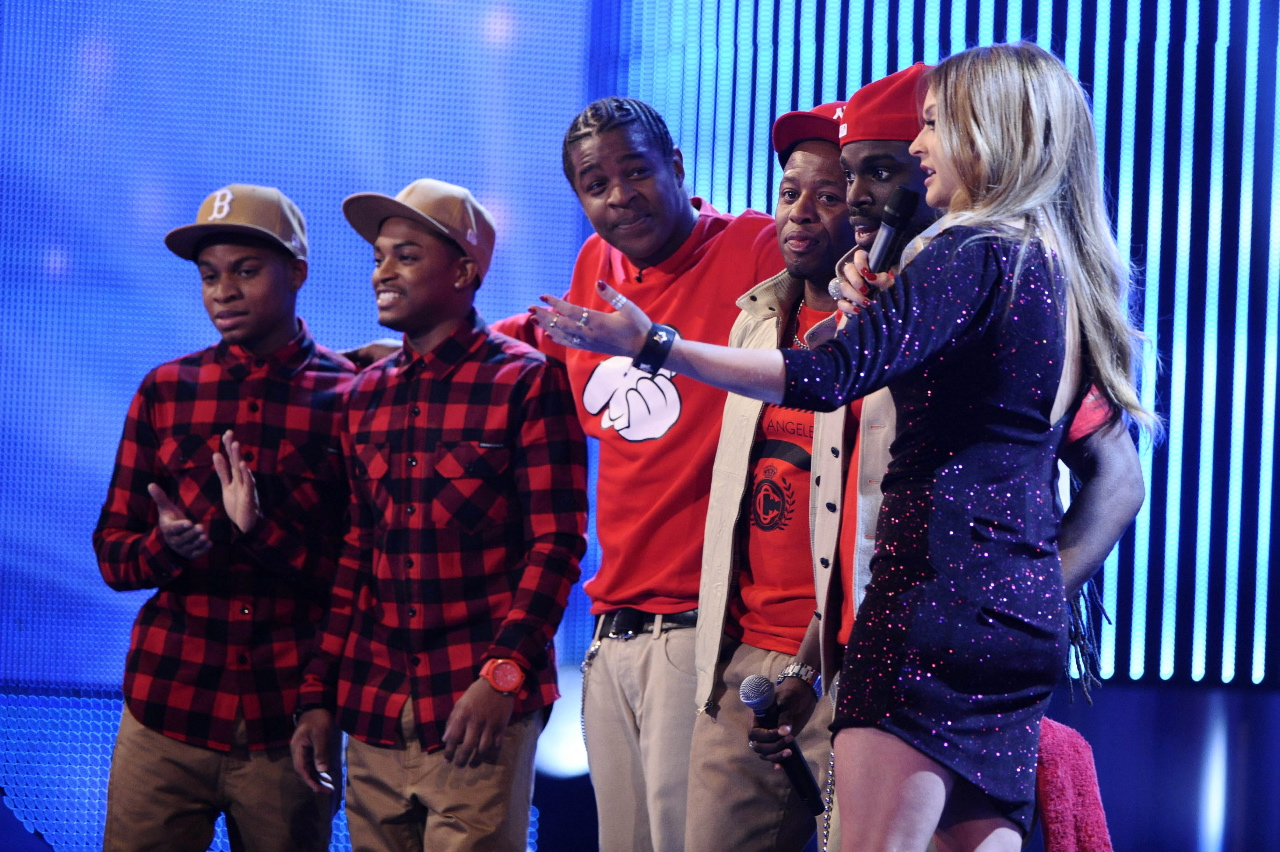
The band with Must Be The Music host Fearne Cotton

In 2006 BBC Radio 1Xtra came to Derby to record The Trinity Band performing at Rukus' Originality Stands Alone launch party, giving the live footage a full two-hour broadcast. The band performed at Kensington Palace for Prince Charles, Jools Holland, and others at The Princes Trust Urban Music Festival. They were the Midlands resident group for the I Luv Live Franchise, and in 2009 performed at the Fuse Festival.

In 2010 the band reached the semi-finals of Sky1's televised music competition Must Be The Music. They performed their original single "This Must Be Love" on television on 9 May. On 7 September 2010, they released their "This Must Be Love" single on iTunes, which peaked on the UK Indie Chart at No. 23.

In late March 2011 the group released It's a Trinity Ting Live EP. They played at Mayfest on 17 May 2011, and Osfest on 24 May 2011.

== Live and Unsigned ==
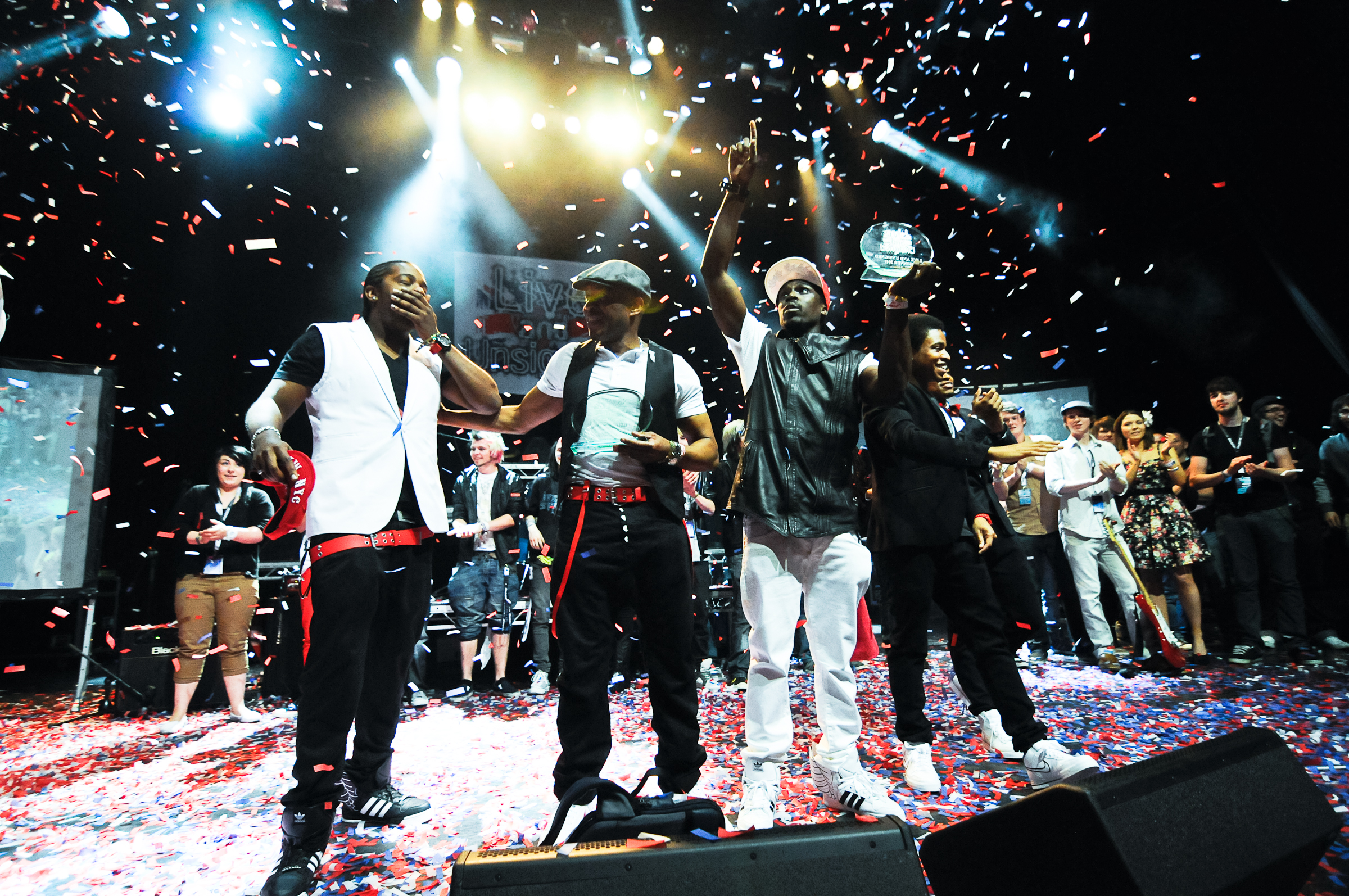
Winning Live and Unsigned 2011

On 23 July 2011, The Trinity Band were chosen by judges as the overall winner of the Live and Unsigned music contest at Live Fest, as well as winner of the Urban, Pop & Acoustic category. The band had successfully passed through a series of semi-finals that included 10,000 participants. At the final concert at Indig02 The Trinity Band performed their own original song "Supanova" and a cover of "Champion" by Chris Brown and Chipmunk. Judges included Tom Deacon, Michael King of BGM Music, Chris Grayston, Bez from Happy Mondays, Alex Baker from Kerrang! Ben Price from Future Music, and Annika Allen from Flavour Magazine. For winning, the band was awarded a £50,000 investment and management contract with Future Music Management, including a £15,000 publicity investment, and £15,000 for the recording and release of a single. The band are set to do a UK tour of up to 100 shows.

It has been announced that in October they will perform at Sound Academy in Toronto.

== Members ==
Current

- Dwaine "Singer Man" Hayden – vocals, writer, producer
- Obe "Rukus" Watson – MC, rap, writer, producer
- Craig "Keys" Dawkins – keyboard writer, producer
- James "J Drums" Dawkins – drums writer, producer
- Pete "Bass" Sharpe – bass, guitar, writer, producer

== Discography ==
Year	Single	Chart Positions				
Year	Single	UK Pop	IR Pop	UK Singles	UK	UK IND
2010	"This Must Be Love"	42	75	96	194	23
2010	"—" denotes single that did not chart or was not released					

Albums

- It's a Trinity Ting Live EP (2011)
