= Rukus (disambiguation) =

Rukus is a character in the animated TV series Legends of Chima.

Rukus may also refer to:

- The Rukus! Federation, a Black queer arts charity.
- The Toyota Corolla Rumion, known as the Toyota Rukus in Australia.
- Obe "Rukus" Watson, a member of The Trinity Band.
