= Battle of the bands =

Music performance competition

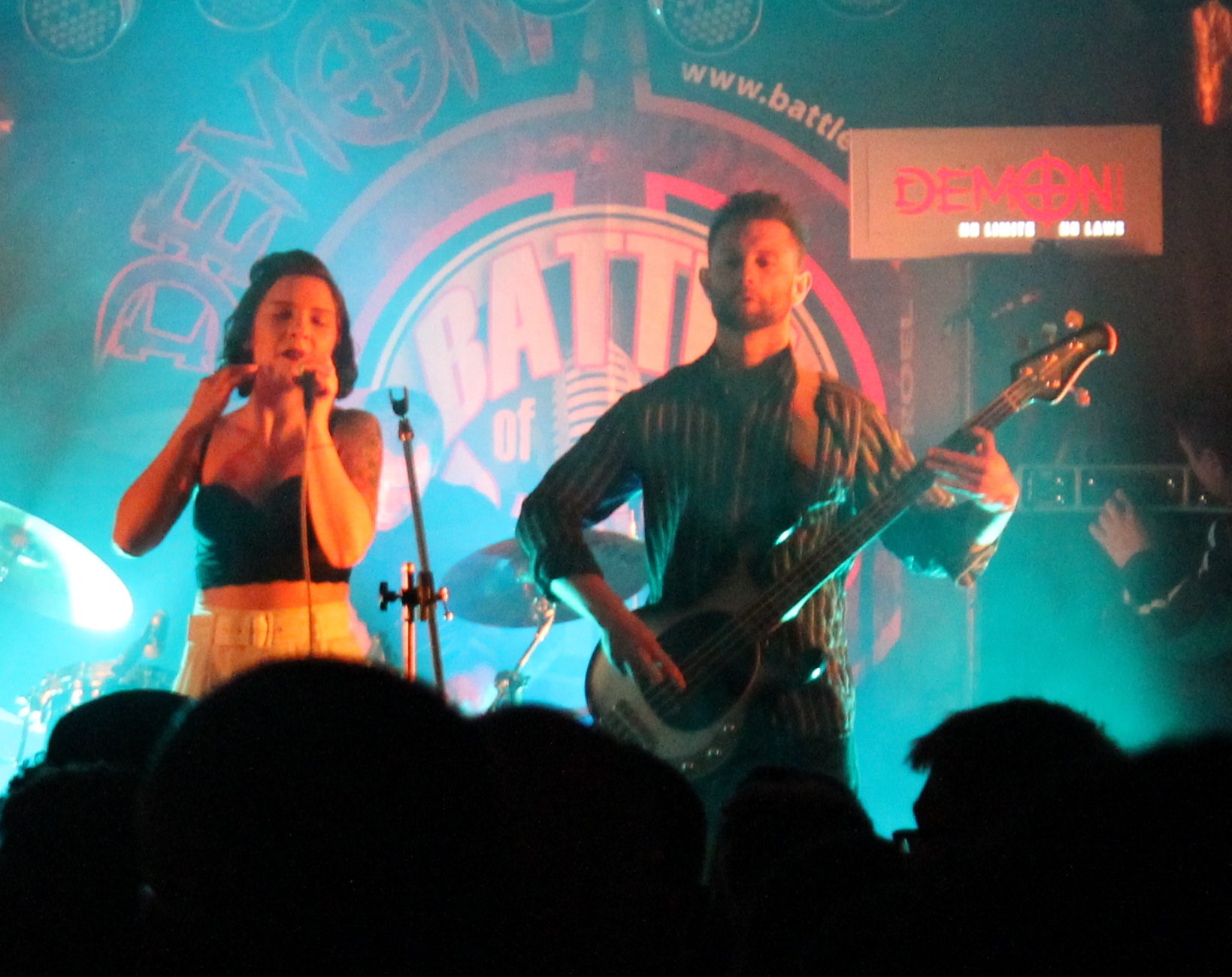
A performance in a battle of the bands final, at The Kings Arms pub in Auckland

A battle of the bands is a music contest or competition in which a number of bands compete for the title of "best band". The winner is determined by a voice vote of the audience or the band who brings the most people to support them. Traditionally, battles of bands are held at live music events and forums. Popular examples include the yearly Live and Unsigned contest in the United Kingdom and the annual SoundWave Music Competition.

== Format ==
A battle of the bands is a contest in which many bands, usually rock or metal bands, but often musical acts from a range of different styles, compete for the title of "best band". Its history though goes back to earlier times, at least the 1930s swing era, when big band battles between famous band leaders like Chick Webb, the Casa Loma Orchestra, Benny Goodman, and Count Basie were regularly organised in big dancehalls, like the Savoy Ballroom. The winner is determined by a panel of judges, the general response of the audience, or a combination. The winning band usually receives a prize in addition to bragging rights. Prizes usually include cash, free recording time in a local recording studio, support or main slot at a local or large gig, a piece of new equipment, or a gift certificate. For instance, the band Phish won a battle of the bands competition in 1989 in their hometown of Burlington, Vermont, and won recording time at a local studio, which they used to record their second album Lawn Boy.

Battles of bands are sometimes held as part of a live music event; they are also commonly held at high schools and universities. The term "Battle of the Bands" is a trademark in Canada, held since 1998 by the Toronto promotions company Supernova Interactive.

== Historical events ==
In the United States one of the oldest rows of a battle of the bands talent show has been hosted by the Hollywood Bowl in Los Angeles, the first time in 1959. The annual contest was meant to showcase teenage musicians and singers, the participants were either independent or associated with high schools and competed in several divisions like school band, vocal group, vocalist and combo. Auditions were being held early in the year, preliminary contests in spring and the finals in the Bowl in the summer. Two later famous musicians that have performed at the Hollywood Bowl Battle were Karen and Richard Carpenter in 1966 (winner in combo and sweepstake).

One of the best-known battle of the bands competitions in the United States was the Rock 'n' Roll Rumble, held by the Boston rock radio station WBCN. The competition was held by the station from 1979 until its closure in 2009, and was then subsequently operated by an independent group. Several winners and participants became nationally popular after appearing in the competition, including Mission of Burma (1979 participant), 'Til Tuesday (1983 winner), The Lemonheads (1988 participant), Letters to Cleo, Morphine, Powerman 5000 (all 1992 participants), The Amazing Royal Crowns (1997 winner) and The Dresden Dolls (2003 winner).

The simultaneous release of albums and singles in 1995 sparked a media-fuelled "Battle of Britpop" between northern England's working-class Oasis and southern England's middle-class Blur. Also in the United Kingdom, the largest annual music contest in a battle of the bands format is Live and Unsigned, which has been operating since 2007. The contest regularly draws 10,000 participants, with the grand prize of a £50,000 recording deal.

== In popular culture ==
A battle of the bands event forms the climax of a number of films, including Up in Smoke (1978), Cotton Candy (1978), Freaky Friday (2003), School of Rock (2003), Metal Lords (2022), Bandslam (2009), Bill & Ted's Bogus Journey (1991) and Blues Brothers 2000 (1998). In the horror thriller film House at the End of the Street (2011), starring Jennifer Lawrence, there are scenes resembling battle of the bands.

In the mid-1960s, battle of the bands events became popular in Texas. The Catacombs, a popular Houston rock nightclub in what is now the Uptown area of Houston, hosted many well known groups of the era including Grateful Dead, Jethro Tull, The Jeff Beck Group and The Mothers of Invention. Dallas, Austin and San Antonio were also popular venues.

In 1968, California rock band The Turtles released a concept album, The Turtles Present the Battle of the Bands, with the band playing in different styles from psychedelic to surf music to bluegrass.

In the Take That musical Never Forget, the show centres on a tribute band working to win the "Battle of the Tribute Bands".

Third World Games have produced a Battle of the Bands card game, which takes a tongue-in-cheek look at the music business. The object is to recruit members into your band, equip them with instruments, win "gigs" and "hit singles" and earn enough "Superstar Points" to win. The game is also available for play on GameTable Online. There is also a Battle of the Bands video game and TV movie. In the music video game Guitar Hero World Tour and all games that followed, a "battle of the bands" mode is featured as an online gameplay mode.

In the book Diary Of A Wimpy Kid: Diper Överlöde, Rodrick’s band, Löded Diper, competes in a battle of the bands, but loses to the band Metallichihuahua.

The "battle of the bands" concept has had a heavy influence on reality television. Shows such as the Idol series and The X Factor borrow the basic concept of a "battle of the bands" except with individual singers instead of whole bands, combining the concept with a serial elimination format. There was a brief American series in the vein, The Next Great American Band, that did use whole bands. The former South African competition Rockspaaider followed a battle of the bands format, where rock-bands from all over the country are given the chance to compete for the title "Rockspaaider" and a recording contract. Along with the introduction of the Afrikaans music channel MK, the competition resulted in the resurgence of the Afrikaans music industry, especially the rise of Afrikaans Rock.

In the comedy film Bill & Ted's Bogus Journey (1991), Bill and Ted's band Wyld Stallyns competes in and wins a battle of the bands performing "God Gave Rock 'n' Roll to You II". California rock band Primus makes a cameo appearance as rival contestants performing "Tommy the Cat".

In the comedy film Blues Brothers 2000 (1998), The Blues Brothers Band and The Louisiana Gator Boys compete against each other in a battle of the bands. The Louisiana Gator Boys wins the Battle, and Elwood Blues suggests that the two bands perform together on stage, which they do.

The comedy-drama film Drumline (2002) features a battle of the bands with several historically black collegiate marching bands.

In the comedy film Freaky Friday (2003), Anna Coleman's band Pink Slip enters a battle of the bands at the House of Blues before they perform at her parents' wedding.

In the comedy film School of Rock (2003), Dewey Finn enters a battle of the bands with his students. It happens in the musical and television adaptation of the same name.

In the video game Rhythm Heaven (2008), there is a battle of the bands gamemode. It is similar to the Rockers mini-game, but with songs from other mini games, except That One Song, which is the Rockers 2 song. Drummer Duel (also from the DS game) serves a similar purpose. The Live feature from Rhythm Tengoku serves as a predecessor to this, as it is similar in concept.

The 2010 comic book adaptation film Scott Pilgrim vs. the World features several Battles of the Bands that culminate in actual physical fights.

In the Australian thriller film Swerve (2011), a battle of the marching bands serves as background to most of the scenes set in the small country town.

In the animated film My Little Pony: Equestria Girls – Rainbow Rocks (2014), a trio of banished sirens from Equestria arrive at Canterlot High School and quickly transform the school's upcoming musical showcase into a battle of the bands in order to feed on the negative energy created by pitting groups against each other.

In the Amphibia episode Battle of the Bands (2021) Mayor Toadstool hosts a battle of the bands contest. After disputes are settled, Anne, Sasha and Marcy perform a rock song. The winner is the warlord toad Grime who wins the competition with his three-hour harp solo.
