= Open microphone =

Open microphone may refer to:

- Open mike, a live show where audience members may perform at the microphone
  - Daily Telegraph Open Mic Award, a competition for comedians in the UK that run from 1994 and 2002.
  - Open Mic UK, a live music competition in the UK, started in 2008.
- Microphone gaffe, when something is broadcast over a microphone by mistake
