= Live Fest =

UK music festival

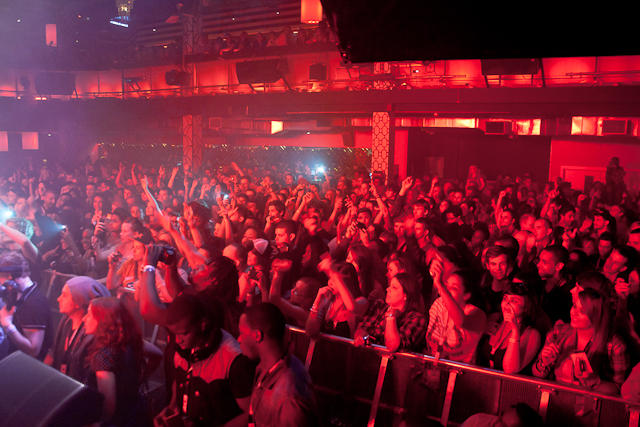
- Crowd at Live Fest, July 2011
- Genre: Indie, Urban, Pop, Folk, Rock, Electronica
- Dates: 23 July 2011; 21 January 2012
- Locations: O2 Arena, London, UK
- Years active: 2011–present
- Website: Official website

Live Fest is a bi-annual music festival held at The O2 in London. According to its organizers, it is the largest indoor music festival in the United Kingdom. In the first festival on 23 July 2011, some of the headlining acts included Zane Lowe, Tinchy Stryder, Roll Deep, The Hoosiers, and Funeral for a Friend. Prominent genres of music at the festival include urban, pop, rock, and indie.

== Overview ==
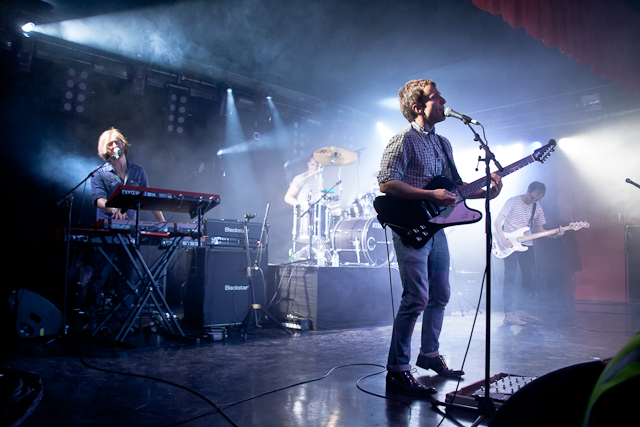
The Hoosiers performing at Live Fest in July 2011

Live Fest is a bi-annual music festival that takes place at The O2 in London. Programming took place over five stages within The O2, including Proud2, Inc Club, and the IndigO2. The O2 Arena is the second largest arena in the UK, and in 2008 it took the crown of the world's busiest music arena from the MEN Arena. During the festival the IndiO2 stage is dedicated to emerging and unsigned UK musicians with the Grand National Finales of the Live and Unsigned and Open Mic UK music contests. The Live and Unsigned finale occurs in mid-summer, while Open Mic UK typically occurs in January. The next Live Fest has been announced as 21 January 2012. The mascot for the festival is a green alien called Bob. Prominent genres of music at the festival include urban, pop, rock, and hardcore. According to Irwin Sparkes, the festival's headlining lineup for pop acts is particularly strong.

== Live Fest by event ==
=== 23 July 2011 ===
The first Live Fest took place on 23 July 2011. Urban acts were largely held at Proud2, while most of the headlining bands performed at IndigO2. According to organizers, some 6,000 people attended.

Headliners

- Zane Lowe
- Tinchy Stryder
- Roll Deep
- The Hoosiers
- Missing Andy
- Hatty Keane
- Greig Stewart of Guillemots
- Tempa T
- Pegasus Bridge
- Funeral for a Friend
- Kids in Glass Houses
- Bez from Happy Mondays
- Gary Powell of The Libertines
- Nate Young

Original headliners N-Dubz cancelled a week before the festival after a judging conflict for The X Factor. Other acts included Paradise Point, Saturday Night Gym Club, My Electrik, Ras Kwame, David Benassi, Lazy Grafters, Back Acid Soul, Kasha, Flowdem and Fdot1 who brought other performers up on stage with him to perform tracks from his album Money MusicK. According to organizers, over 200 acts performed across the five stages. At the Live and Unsigned 2011 Grand final occurring concurrently at the IndigO2, The Trinity Band was voted the winner by a panel of judges.

Amy Winehouse was announced dead just hours before the end of the festival. Artists such as Zane Lowe and Roll Deep were among the first to announce the news to their audience, and played tributes in their acts.

== See also ==
- Open Mic UK
- Live and Unsigned
