= Robbie Boyd =

British singer, songwriter and musician

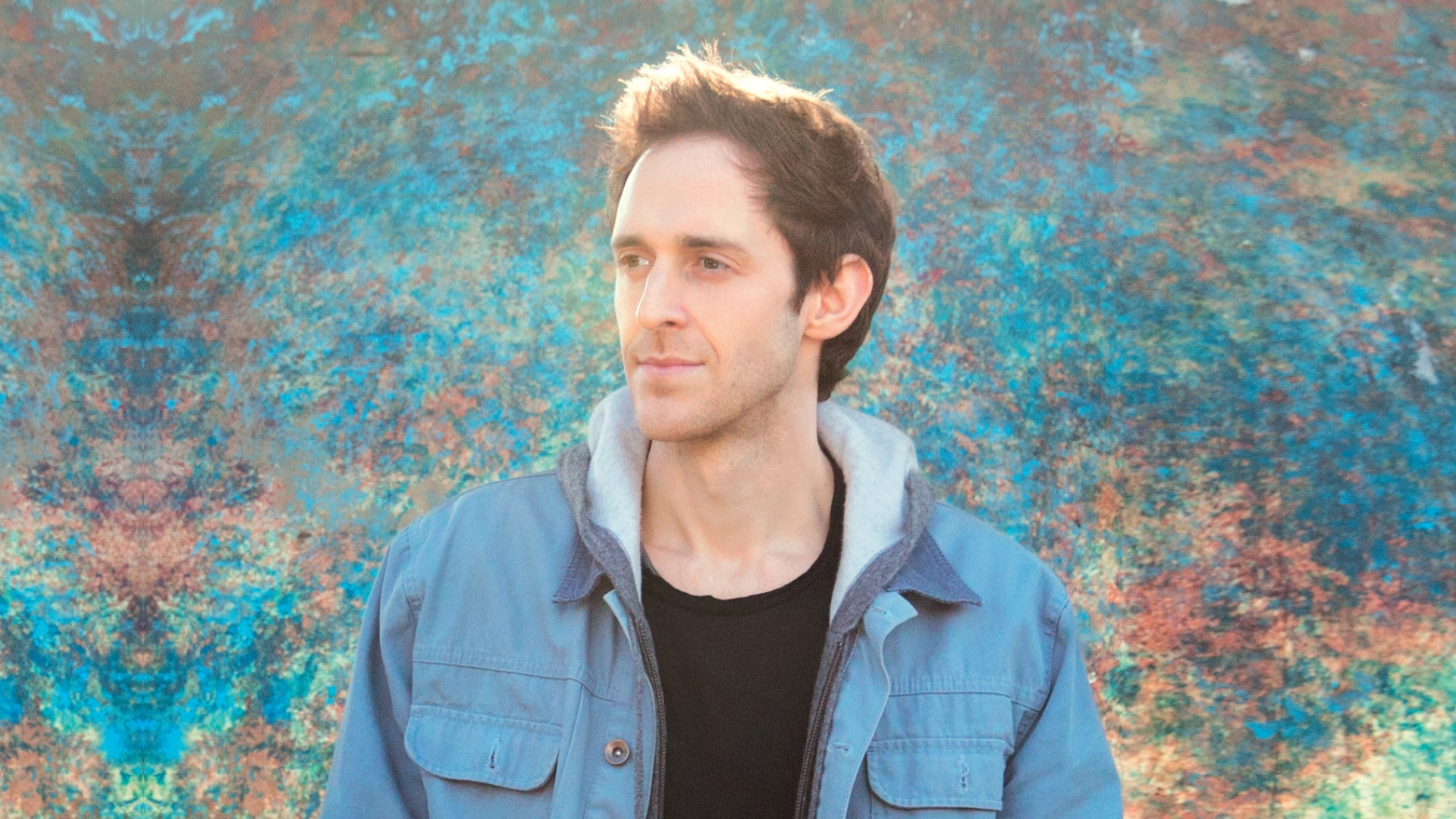
- Robbie Boyd

Background information
- Origin: London
- Genres: Pop; folk
- Occupations: Songwriter, singer, musician
- Years active: 2010–present
- Labels: GM Records (Glorious Music), Colored Owl Records
- Website: www.robbie-boyd.com

Robbie Boyd is a British singer, songwriter and musician from London, England.

The Robbie Boyd Band have performed live on ITV's This Morning, and been aired on various BBC radio stations including Graham Norton's show on BBC Radio 2.

The Robbie Boyd Band have supported artists including McFly. They have played at festivals in the UK and sold out shows in London including The Borderline and Bush Hall.

In 2010 Boyd's songs "Oh Alaska" and "New Hampshire" were included in Sir Tim Rice's BBC Radio 2 series American Pie. The following year, The Robbie Boyd Band won the "Alternative" category of Live and Unsigned and were also named London's "Busker of the Year".

The Robbie Boyd Band released a number of singles and EPs which received positive reviews. Even though the 'Band' was still central to the sound, by the 2013 release of the Painted Sky EP, Robbie had dropped reference to the 'Band' in name and was just publishing under his own. In May 2014 he released his debut album, So Called Man, which received mixed reviews.

Boyd was associated with GM Records (Glorious Music) from 2017. As of 2021 he was no longer with GM Records and had swapped to Rollover Music.

== Discography ==
=== Albums ===
- Time Will Tell (2019)
- Break the Chain (2017)
- So Called Man (2014)

=== EPs ===
- Surrender (Robbie Boyd and Heaven's Joy) (2018)
- Sleeping in Ruins (2014)
- Under My Skin (2013)
- Painted Sky (2013)
- Spring Generation (2012)
- Autumn's Flown (2012)
- A London Reminition (2011)

=== Singles ===
- "Tell The World" (2019)
- "Life To Be Lived" (2019)
- "The Mighty Oak" (2019)
- "Wait" (Resolution feat. Robbie Boyd) (2017)
- "Hey Girl" (2017)
- "Whole Love" (2017)
- "Taste Life" (2015)
- "Brave" (2015)
- "Less Than Friends" (2014)
- "When I Believe" (2012)
- "Orion's Belt" (2012)
- "I Won't Let You Go" (2012)
