= We Beat The System =

English alternative rock band

- We Beat The System

Background information
- Origin: Sunderland, England
- Genres: Alternative rock Indie rock
- Years active: 2009–present
- Labels: Unsigned – Alternative winners of Live and Unsigned 2010
- Members: Daniel Mason; Jonathan Gray; Martin Dagg; Jon Sandwith; David Burlace
- Website: http://www.myspace.com/webeatthesystemuk

We Beat The System are a five-piece English, alternative rock band from Sunderland. Formed in 2009, the group consists of Daniel Mason (lead singer & keyboard), Jonathan Gray (guitar), Martin Dagg (guitar), Jon Sandwith (bass guitar) and David Burlace (drums and percussion). The band has been tipped by the BBC as having a "promising future ahead of them" after winning the Best Alternative Act category in the Live and Unsigned 2010 competition at the O2 Arena in London – the United Kingdom's largest national music competition for unsigned bands.

The members of We Beat The System met while attending the Venerable Bede Church of England School in Sunderland and formed the band in October 2009. They have since supported The Automatic, Frankie & The Heartstrings, Chapel Club, Flashguns, Dutch Uncles and Wilder. After winning Live and Unsigned, the band was invited to play at Sunderland's 2010 Split Festival. The band has since played at Newcastle's 2011 Evolution Festival and is currently recording with Let’s Buy Happiness guitarist James Hall. The sound of the band has been described as Alternative/Post-Punk Revival, similar to bands such as Editors, White Lies, Radiohead and early U2.
