= Chris Grayston =

English music promoter (born 1971)

- Also known as: C. Grayston
- Born: 1971 (age 54–55)
- Origin: England
- Genres: Happy hardcore, breakbeat, punk rock
- Occupations: Record producer, music promoter, talent scout
- Instrument: Keyboards
- Years active: 1990–present
- Labels: Future Music; Fusion Records; Hectic Records

Chris Grayston (born 1971) is an English music promoter, event organizer, record producer, musician, label owner and talent scout. He is currently employed as a music consultant including working for acts and record labels.

== Biography ==
=== Live and Unsigned and Open Mic UK ===
In 2007, Grayston organised and co-founded Live and Unsigned, an annual music competition for unsigned acts in the United Kingdom. He has served as events director and head judge for the competition. The competition annually attracts 10,000 participants, and after a series of live judging panels, ends with a summer National Grand Final at the Indig02 as part of Live Fest.

Through the competition Grayston has discovered a number of acts, including 2007 winners B-Kay and Kazz, who later achieved a top 30 hit in the UK charts with the single You Know it's Right.

Grayston discovered participant Josh Dubovie in 2008, who went on to represent the United Kingdom at the 2010 Eurovision Song Contest. In 2008 he also discovered Welsh indie/electronic band Kiddo360, which won the Grand Final and later went on to win a Vodafone Award. Nathan Sykes performed in 2008, before he joined The Wanted. In the same year, Grayston was involved in setting up the first Open Mic UK, as a spin off of Live and Unsigned.

In 2010, the competition winners were The Lottery Winners and Scottish band The Detours.

Future Music was incorporated in 2013. The original Live and Unsigned company was dissolved in 2014. In 2015, Future Production was incorporated. The company runs Open Mic UK.

=== Book and companies ===
In 2016, Grayston directed company Future Music was dissolved, and TeenStar incorporated. The same year Grayston published a book called The Secret to Success in the Music Industry.

== Controversies ==
Following Luke Friend's appearance on 2013's X Factor and subsequent top-40 hit, Future Music threatened to sue Friend for alleged breach of contract. Future Music argued that "the winner must give TeenStar, run by Future Music, first refusal on management services within 18 months of winning", in addition to "appearances and promotion for an 18 month period from the end of the competition for a minimum of 5 times". Luke Friend's management company, Crown Management, have stated that "Our client was saddened to have received this claim from Future Music with whom he worked amicably for some time, including during his time in X-Factor. The claim has absolutely no basis in fact and will be robustly defended. We have every expectation that our client will be vindicated in due course."

== Personal life ==
Grayston has three children, and in 2016 lived in Shirley.

== Discography ==
=== Albums ===
- 2001: Inverse Catch-22 by Cynical Blend – producer, keyboards

=== Singles ===
- 1994: "Midas Volume 1" by Midas
- 1995: "QSH006" "Give Yourself to Me by Midas" (Quosh Records)
- 1995: "FUS001" by Midas (Fusion Records)
- 1995: "RAR010" by Midas Imperial March (Slammin Vinyl records)
- 1995: "Midas and Dougal" by Midas (Hectic Records)
- 1995: "HVR006 You Take Me Away" by Midas (Happy Vibes Recordings)
- 1996: "FUS004" by Midas (Fusion Records)
- 1996: "FUS008" by Midas (Fusion Records)
- 1996: "MDMA002 Midas Volume 2" by Midas
- 1996: "Midas and Sunset Regime" by Midas (Hectic Records)
- 1997: "HR001 Doesn't Have to Be" by Ikon (Hectic Rewinds Records)

=== Compilation appearances ===
- 1995: "Groove Control" (DJ Clarke'e Remix) on Just 4 U Vol. 2
- 1995: "The Flow" on Hardcore
- 2007: "Give Yourself to Me" on Best of Bonkers

== See also ==
- Open Mic UK
