= Missing Andy =

British band

- Origin: Essex, England
- Genres: Alternative rock, post-Britpop, ska, mod revival, British hip hop
- Years active: 2010–2023
- Members: Alex Greaves; Jonathan Sharpe; Rob Jones; Elliot Richardson; Steve Greenwood
- Past members: Steve Rolls; Gareth Babet; Peter Brooker
- Website: www.facebook.com/missingandyofficial

Missing Andy was a British band based in Essex and primarily influenced by mod subculture. After 15 years of playing together, the group announced they were separating to focus on individual projects on 20 March 2023. They played their final farewell gig in hometown Braintree, Essex on 28 May 2023. At the time of separation, the group consisted of members Alex Greaves, Jonathan Sharpe, Rob Jones, and Elliot Richardson.

The band's debut single "The Way We're Made (Made in England)" reached #38 on the UK Singles Chart and #7 on the UK Indie Chart in September 2010, following an appearance as semi-finalists on Sky1's television talent competition, Must Be the Music. Their debut digital-only EP "The Greatest Show on Earth - Act I" was released on 4 October 2010, with four tracks. It is said to be part of a compilation of an unspecified number of singles. Missing Andy have also released three studio albums (Generation Silenced, Guerrilla Invasion Pt. 1 and Guerrilla Invasion Pt. 2).

== History ==
=== 2008–2011: Early years ===
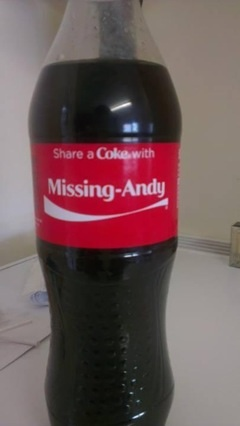
Missing Andy coke

Missing Andy were good friends when they formed to make a band in 2008. They played in local pubs and clubs in Essex, and gained some popularity on the internet, both through Facebook and on YouTube.

=== 2011–2012: Must Be the Music and album ===
The band auditioned for Must Be the Music in the summer of 2010, receiving a good response from the crowd at their first audition. They got through to the semi-finals by decision of the judges and, via public phone votes, they reached the final before ultimately reaching the final three. Missing Andy lost out to Emma's Imagination, who won the competition outright, making Missing Andy runners-up along with five-piece band The Pictures. Having later reflected upon being on the show, the band have since spoken of the positive and negative qualities of it with Greaves saying, "The TV show kind of damaged us a bit, but good things have come of it."

In October 2010 band released the first part of a download-only digital EP containing four tracks, and in October 2011 they released their debut full album, Generation Silenced, in download-only digital format.

=== 2012–2013: Acoustic EP, A Non-Album Single and Guerrilla Invasion ===
In 2012, Missing Andy began work on a follow-up to Generation Silenced.

In 2012, Missing Andy Released a Single in 2012 called Subway and a Live Music Video as well.

In January 2013, the band released an acoustic EP showcasing stripped-down versions of new songs that would feature on their new album. The EP consisted of four songs: "It's Over", "Young Disciple", "Mr. Policeman" and "Slip Away", all acoustic versions. The EP gained positive reviews and charted highly in the iTunes rock chart.

The band announced via the Internet that their second album was to be called Guerrilla Invasion and the first single taken from it would be "Feel Like This". Missing Andy announced via their Twitter page on 29 January 2013 that they would hold an album launch party for Guerrilla Invasion at London's Koko on 29 March 2013. Attendees would be able to hear the brand-new songs and could purchase the album along with new merchandise before the album was released. A video for "Feel Like This" was released on YouTube on 23 February. The single was released on 11 March 2013 and the album Guerrilla Invasion was released on 1 April 2013 in two parts.

In support of the album, Missing Andy embarked on their Guerrilla Invasion Tour. The tour featured dates around the UK including shows in Manchester, Liverpool, Glasgow and Birmingham. The tour started in March 2013 (at London's Koko) and ran through the summer until October 2013.

=== 2020:A Non-Album Single called The Greatest Show On Earth and Disbanded ===
On December 4 2020, Missing Andy Released a Non-Album Single and Music Video called The Greatest Show On Earth.

The band announced via Facebook on 20 March 2023 they would be splitting up after 15 years together to focus on other projects. They played one last show at Festival in the Gardens, Braintree on 28 May 2023.

== Members ==
=== Primary members ===
- Alex Greaves - vocals
- Jonathan Sharpe - synth/keyboards
- Rob Jones - bass, backing vocals
- Elliot Richardson - drums, piano
- Steve Greenwood - Guitar

=== Former members ===
- Peter Brooker - synth/keyboards
- Gareth Babet - synth/keyboards
- Steve Rolls - guitar, backing vocals

== Discography ==
=== Albums ===
Year	Album	Peak chart positions	
Year	Album	UK	UK Indie Chart
2010	The Greatest Show On Earth - Act I: Released: 4 October 2010; Label: Format: digital download	-	-
2011	Generation Silenced: Released: 13 October 2011; Label:Invasion; Format: digital download, CD	-	-
2013	Guerrilla Invasion Pt. 1: Released: 1 April 2013; Label:Intrepid; Format: digital download, CD	-	9
2013	Guerrilla Invasion Pt. 2: Released: 1 April 2013; Label:Intrepid; Format: digital download, CD	-	10
"-" denotes a title that did not chart.

=== Singles ===
Year	Song	Peak chart positions		Album
Year	Song	UK	UK IND	
2010	"The Way We're Made (Made in England)"	38	7	Generation Silenced (Deluxe Edition)
2010	"Sing for the Deaf"	36	8	Generation Silenced (Deluxe Edition)
2010	"A Call to Arms"			Generation Silenced (Deluxe Edition)
2011	"Kings for the Weekend"			Generation Silenced (Deluxe Edition)
2011	"Dave"			Generation Silenced (Deluxe Edition)
2011	"Money"			Generation Silenced (Deluxe Edition)
2012	"Subway"			Non-Album Single
2013	"Feel Like This"			Guerrilla Invasion Pt. 2
2020	"The Greatest Show On Earth"			Non-Album Single
