= Open Mic UK =

•

- Genre: Music competition
- Begins: August
- Ends: January
- Frequency: Annually
- Locations: Live fest at IndigO2, London, United Kingdom
- Years active: 18
- Inaugurated: 2008
- Most recent: ongoing
- Participants: 10,000 annually
- Patron: Live and Unsigned
- Website: www.openmicuk.co.uk

Open Mic UK is a live music competition for singers, vocalists and solo artists run by Future Music Management in the UK. Competitors compete at regional auditions to qualify to perform live at live music showcases and reach an annual national final, which is held at Indigo at The O2 complex in London and The National Exhibition Centre in Birmingham. The event, which offers a recording contract and investment to the final winner, was described by Joel James of BBC York & North Yorkshire as "one of the toughest competitions in the country."

== Overview ==
According to its organizers, Open Mic UK is the largest music search in the United Kingdom for vocal groups and solo artists. The competition was originally devised by Chris Grayston as a spin-off from the Live and Unsigned competition as a result of the high number of solo singers and vocalist entrants to that competition, who were without their songs. Entrants compete in a series of local and regional heats to qualify to perform at the National Grand Final, and the chosen acts in each category compete at the final event. The competition attracts around 10,000 competing acts each year, but in recent years has substantially grown; with an estimated 12,000 acts set to compete in 2015. Between 2013 and 2020, UK video production company HNE Media filmed the UK-wide competitions.

The competition has had acts such as Birdy, Luke Friend, Lucy Spraggan and Jahmene Douglas perform in or win the competition.

== Categories ==
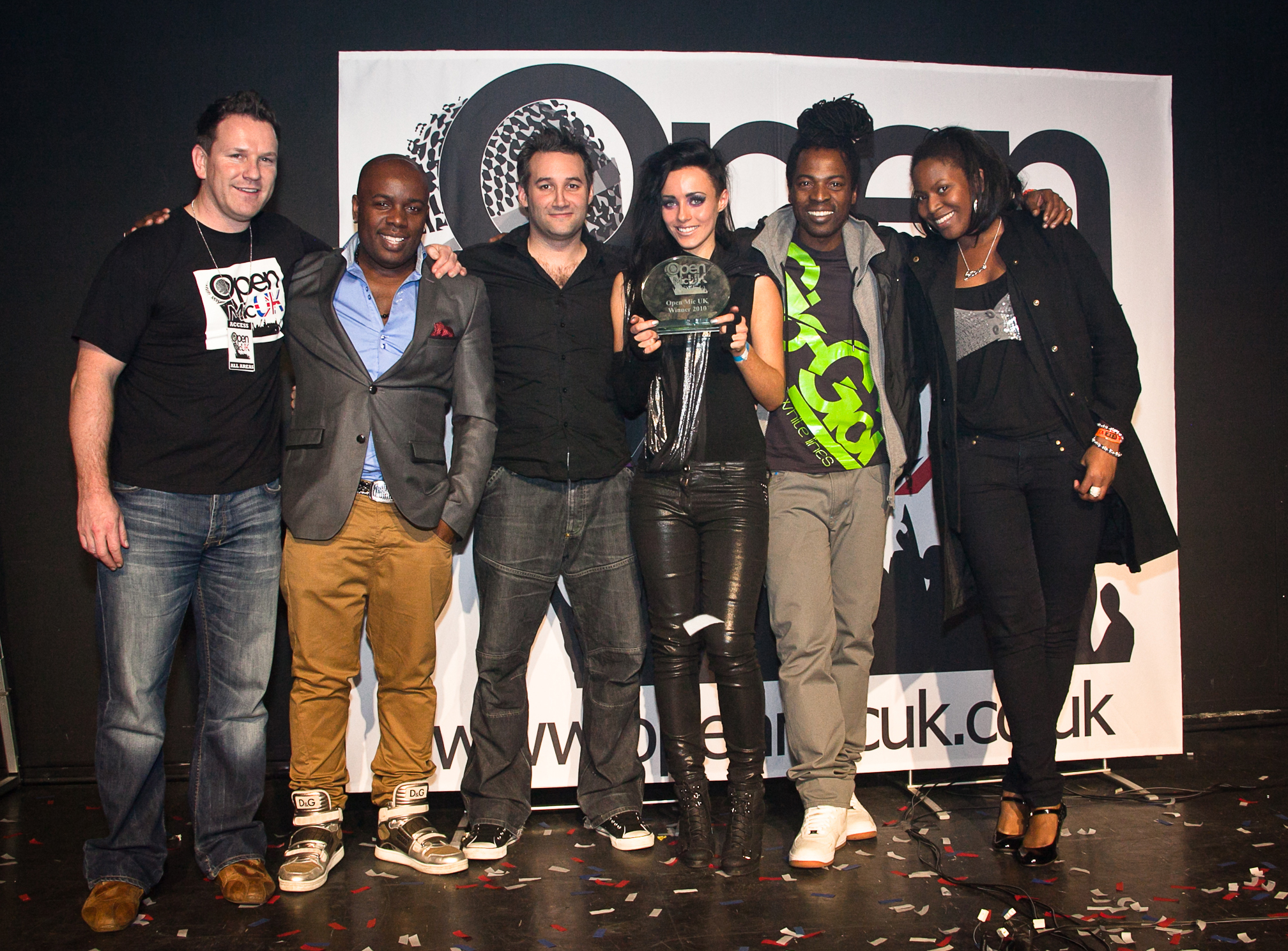
Winner Hatty Keane (third from right) with 2010 judges

Singers, rappers, groups, and acoustic singer/songwriters of all genres are accepted as competitors. The competition used to be divided into three age categories; 16 and under, 17–23, and 23 and over. However, since the 2013 competition these age categories have changed to Under 16, 16 to 20 and 21 and over.

== Judging ==
Acts can perform either covers or their own original material live, and demos and recorded material are not accepted. Judges from the music industry, celebrities and record labels score all performances on the basis of vocal/musical talent, stage performance, star quality, and individuality, and the winning acts in the age categories must earn the most points from judges. An audience vote is also held in order to aid those in the judges' top scores to make it to the next round of the competition.

== Prizes ==
Each year the different category winners are invited to go on the Open Mic UK Tour, performing up to 100 different gigs across the United Kingdom. Other regular prizes include master classes and a music video.

The annual grand prize for winning the overall competition includes a management deal and an investment. In 2009, this included recording an album in professional studios with an industry vocal specialist. The winner also received a £25,000 investment, a recording contract and a management deal. In 2010, there was an overall £50,000 pool of prizes for winners, with a grand prize investment of up to £30,000. the prize was the same for the 2011 & 2012 competitions.

Since the 2013 competition, the main prize has been £5,000 for the winner to spend on music development, as well as an extensive publicity & development package. In addition to giving all acts feedback from the judges, the competition also awards prizes across the board regionally; including recording studio time and singing lessons.

== Annual competitions ==
=== 2008 ===
The first Open Mic UK took place in 2008. After a series of localized and regional finals, the National Grand Final took place at the Portsmouth Guildhall on 29 November 2008.

The 12-year-old singer/songwriter Birdy won both the under 18s category and the overall contest. She performed her own song at the competition called "So Be Free" in front of 2,000 people, both singing and playing keyboard. Her prize was to record her album in a studio, and she subsequently signed a deal with Warner Bros. Records. In 2011, her version of Bon Iver's "Skinny Love" reached the top twenty of the UK music charts. The single entered the UK Singles Chart Top 40 on 13 March 2011 at number 25 and in the same week reached number 10 on iTunes' UK singles chart.

=== 2009 ===
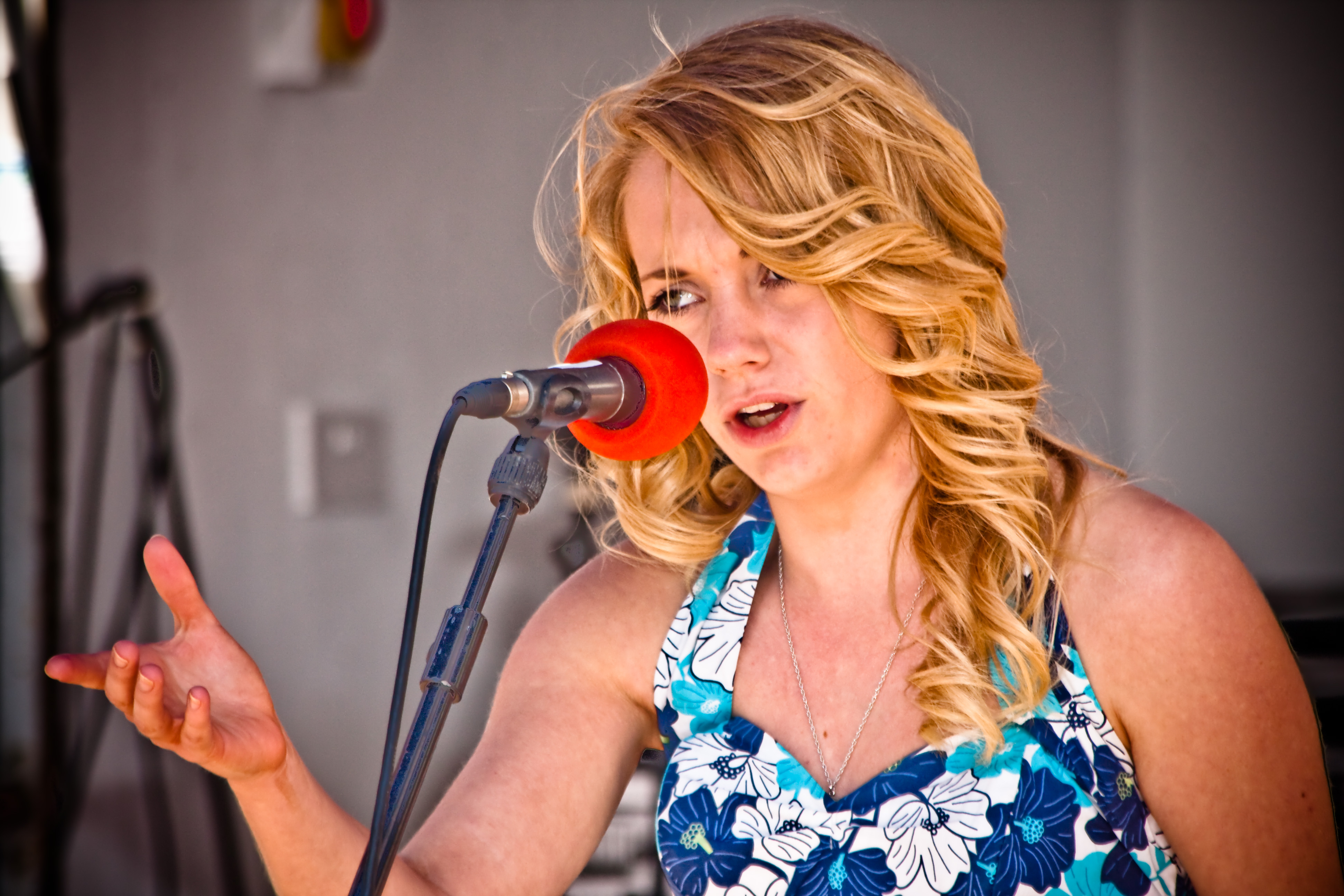
Kirsty Michele Anderson, 2009 winner

The 2009 Grand Final was split into both the South and North finals with the respective finals taking place at Portsmouth Guildhall and The Willows in Manchester. The regional finals leading up to the event took place that October, with the Cardiff final taking place at the Coal Exchange, and another large event at Glasgow's Royal Concert Hall.

Among the performers at the National Grand Final were Vicky Gladwin, Heath Lanzillotti, and Lisa Crawford. Sixteen-year-old pianist and singer Megan Thomas was unanimously voted the winner of the Under-18 category in the North Grand Final, and soprano Kirsty Michele Anderson, an 18-year-old from Hinckley, won her age category as well, with the Over 25 North Final being won by Paul Speak-Heaton. Anderson later went on to perform at Walkers Stadium on Boxing Day, and in April 2010 became the youngest soprano in history to play Mimì in Puccini's opera La bohème. The South Grand Final winners were London busker Jon Curtis who won the over 25-category, Luke Banot who took the 18-24 category, and Under 18 winner Esther Boxell. The Overall winner of Open Mic UK 2009 was the singer/songwriter Luke Banot.

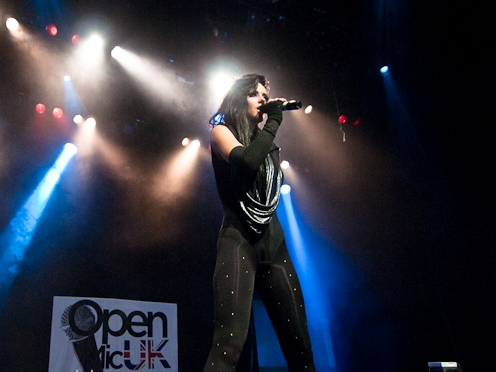
Winner Hatty Keane performing at Open Mic UK 2010

=== 2010 ===
In 2010, the regional finals again took place throughout the United Kingdom in October. The National Grand Final was an all-day event on 15 January 2011 at The O2's indigO2 venue in London.

Among the final participants were Katie Benbow of Dyserth. Hatty Keane from Macclesfield was the winner of the Under-18 category, with 12-year-old Rosanne Hamilton as the runner up. Keane was crowned the overall runner-up. Keane afterwards signed with Future Music and the music company BGM, and later toured as the support for Britain's Got Talent 2010 winners Spelbound. She counts names such as Taio Cruz and producer Deejay amongst her fans. The overall winner was Fran Classic, who also won the 18-25 category. Since winning her category, Hatty Keane has gone on to secure a management contract with BGM (Baby Girl Music). Singer Rose Gray, aged 14 at the time, also reached the finals of the contest, later going on to sign a record deal.

=== 2011 ===
The 2011 final took place on 22 January 2012 at the Indigo2. A 16 year old MC named Shak from Coulsdon won both the under-16 category and was named overall winner. He performed a version of Mac Miller's "Best Day Ever" and was given a recording contract for a single and a development contract with Future Music. Shak also won the award for the Urban Pop genre, which was selected by Flavour Magazine.

Sham from Brixton won the 17-22 category, and Sheena McHugh from Coalville won the 23 and over category. Runner-ups included Vicky Turner, Tayla-Blue, and Quackhouse, from youngest to oldest. Caroline Eve and Karla Bernardi won Exposure Awards, and won studio time. Beth Penrose won the MUZU exposure award, and was given resources to shoot a music video.

The 2011 Open Mic UK competition also saw a very young Lauren Thalia go far in the contest who later got to the Grand Final of ITV’s Britain's Got Talent (series 6) show receiving over 2 million views on YouTube.

Also making a second appearance in the Open Mic UK competition in 2011 was The X Factor (British TV series)' runner up Jahméne Douglas who won his Bristol Regional Final only to get a bout of nerves in his Area Final.

=== 2012 ===
The 2012 Grand Final took place in January 2013 at the Indigo2 after auditions started in August that year. The tour guest act was Lucy Spraggan and was the most searched musician on Google in 2012.

The overall winner was Siana Schofield who went on to have success in series ten of the X Factor later that year. Siana first won her category in the Under-16s.

Shaz Rahman won the 17-20 and Rickey & The Hats won the 21 & Over category.

Other notable acts in the 2012 competition included Lauren Platt, who finished in 4th place in The X Factor series 11. Giles Potter, Alejandro Fernandez-Holt - both of whom competed in The X Factor series 10 and got as far as the Judges Houses and Bootcamp respectively - and Arisxandra Libantino who came very close to winning ITV’s Britain’s Got Talent.

=== 2013 ===
2013 was the first year that the National Grand Final took place at the National Exhibition Centre in Birmingham and was also the first time that the winning act came from the highest age category; with 28-year-old Heidi Browne from Shropshire taking the overall title.

The judging panel for the National Grand Final included: Kerrang Radio, Planet Rock, and 4Music presenter Alex Baker; Sony Music Entertainment talent producer Eddie Evelyn-Hall; Mark Hill - who boasts four Ivor Novello Awards, a number one album, two number one singles and over 10 million record sales worldwide; managing director of River Studios, Gareth Henderson - who has produced for the likes of Alesha Dixon, Corinne Bailey Rae, Birdy and Luke Friend; Tanya Anderson - who has choreographed for acts on the JLS Farewell Tour and the Music Video Awards; A&R scout for Universal Music Group James Morgan; showbiz journalist Jon Hornbuckle; founder of www.music-news.com Marco Gandolfi; songwriter/producer Simon Britton - who has worked with the likes of Eminem, Sting, Usher, Michael Jackson, and Sean Paul; producer and presenter for BBC Introducing Merlin D; and head of Future Music Management Chris Grayston.

=== 2014 ===
The Open Mic UK Grand Final took place at The NEC in Birmingham and gave acts the chance to perform in front of a music industry judging panel which included record label representatives from Sony and Universal. All acts were competing for the title of ‘Open Mic UK Champion 2014’.

South and City's music department is the latest to produce an award-winning student, as Richard Jones won the Open Mic UK music competition for 2014.

Richard Jones was crowned champion in front of a capacity crowd and a prestigious music industry judging panel at The NEC in Birmingham. His original song called "Temptation" won over the competition industry judges making him the overall winner of Open Mic UK. Tom Auton won the under 16’s age category and later that year went on to win the Future Music Songwriting competition at Dingwall’s in Camden.

Heather Cameron Hayes later making it to the semi-final of The Voice on BBC along with other Future Music competition acts Rachel Ann TeenStar winner, Farheem, Tobias Robertson, Eli Cripss, Deano and Lydia Lucy to name a few.

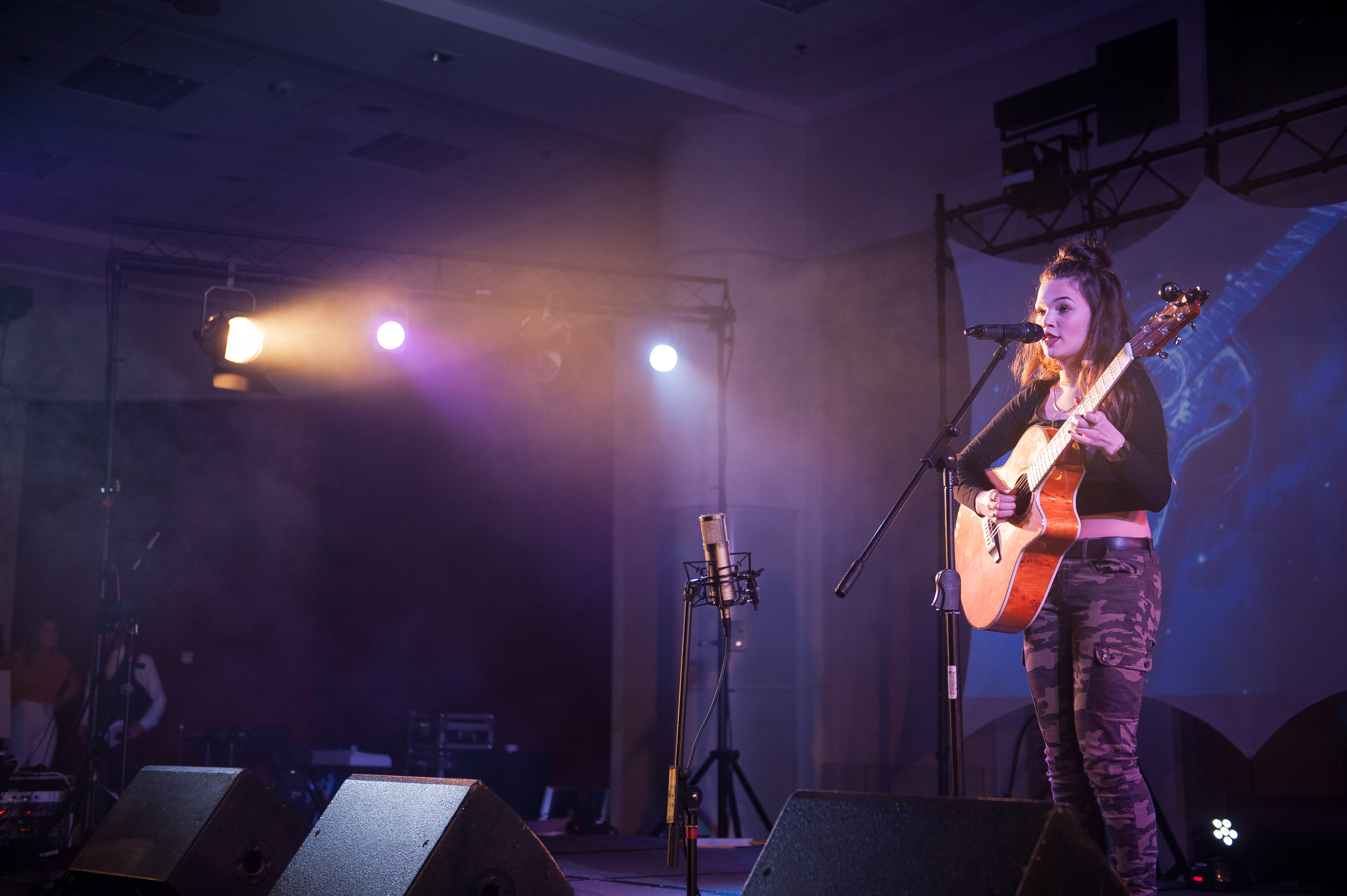
Lola Young at Open Mic UK 2015

=== 2015 ===
The 2015 Open Mic UK Grand Final took place in January 2016 at The NEC in Birmingham.

15-year-old Lola Young from South London was crowned Open Mic UK winner for 2015, fending off competition from artists across various age categories. It marked a huge personal achievement for the young singer-songwriter, who had entered the competition numerous times previous, including running off stage in tears in her earlier years. Lola attends the Brit School who are no strangers to having successful pupils with acts such as Adele and Jessie J and Lola also recently appeared on CBBC show Got What It Takes?. Lola's original song called "Never Enough" won over the competition industry judges making her the overall winner of Open Mic UK.

=== 2016 ===
The Open Mic UK 2016 Grand Final was held at The NEC in Birmingham. The overall winner of the competition was Sam Clines, who won recording studio time to record their album and a video of the best single plus extensive media promotion from a professional PR company.

The panel that judged the Grand Final included; TV personality and Leading vocal coach CeCe Sammy who has worked with Diana Ross, Will Young, Simon Cowell and Leona Lewis. From Universal records, Leon Haynes. Rocket Fuel representative and music manager Andy Baker. A&R consultant for major record companies, Jayne Collins, who put together and managed The Saturdays and The Wanted. Head of talent at Syco Music Barney Addison and Head of Future Music and responsible for discovering Birdy, Lucy Spraggan and Luke Friend, Chris Grayston.

=== 2017 ===
The Open Mic UK 2017 Grand Final was held at The NEC in Birmingham on Saturday 20 January. James Neilson was the overall winner, and he was awarded recording studio time to record his album and a video of his best single plus extensive media promotion from a professional PR company.

The judging panel included; platinum selling artist Dane Bowers. Celebrity vocal coach and TV judge CeCe Sammy, who has worked with celebrities such as Diana Ross, Simon Cowell, Will Young, and Leona Lewis. Head of talent at Syco Music Barney Addison. Preye Crooks from Columbia Records. James Ellett from Modest Management. Head examiner at RockSchool (RSL) Stuart Slater and Head of Future Music and responsible for discovering Birdy (singer), Lucy Spraggan, Luke Friend, Chris Grayston.

=== 2018 ===
The Open Mic UK 2018 Grand Final was held at indigo at The O2 in London on Sunday 20 January. Reuel Elijah was the overall winner of the music competition, receiving studio time to record his album and a video of the best single, plus extensive media promotion from a professional PR company.

The 2018 judging panel included; celebrity vocal coach and TV judge CeCe Sammy, who has worked with celebrities such as Diana Ross, Simon Cowell, Will Young, and Leona Lewis. James Ellett from Modest Management. Head of talent at Syco Music Barney Addison. Jayne Collins, Artist Manager and founder of the very successful pop groups, including The Wanted and The Saturdays. James Sinclair, A&R Manager at Atlantic Records and A&R Manager Leon Haynes of Polydor Records, whose artists have included Girls Aloud, The Saturdays, Take That and Ellie Goulding. Lawrence Hobbs, producer and songwriter signed to Notting Hill and 23rd Precinct Music, and Head of Future Music and responsible for discovering Birdy (singer), Lucy Spraggan, Luke Friend, Chris Grayston.

=== 2019 ===
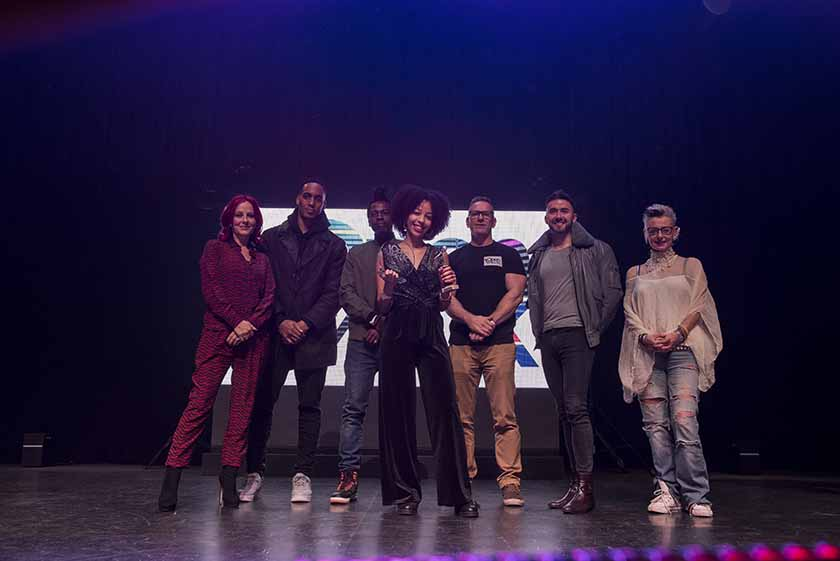
2019 Winner Natalie Lindi with the judges

The Open Mic UK 2019 Grand Final was again held at indigo at The O2 in London on Saturday 1 February. North London singer-songwriter Natalie Lindi was the

Overall winner of the music competition, receiving studio time to record her album and a video of the best single, plus extensive media promotion from a professional PR company and a one on one vocal technique session with celebrity vocal coach CeCe Sammy.

The 2019 judging panel included; BAFTA award-winning presenter and vocalist Carrie Grant, A&R Manager Leon Haynes of Polydor Records, whose artists have included Lana Del Rey, Billie Eilish and Ellie Goulding, Capital Xtra DJ Ras Kwame, singer, songwriter and producer, Suzanna Dee and Head of Future Music and responsible for discovering Birdy (singer), Lucy Spraggan, Luke Friend and more Chris Grayston.

== Overall winners ==
Date	Grand Winners	Under-18	18-24	Over-25
2008	Birdy	Birdy	N/A	N/A
2009	Luke Banot	Megan Thomas, Esther Boxell	Kirsty Michele Anderson, Luke Banot	Jon Curtis, Paul Speak-Heaton
2010	Fran Classic	Hatty Keane	Fran Classic	Eden Vernett Showers
2011	Shak	Shak	Sham	Sheena McHugh

Date	Grand Winner	Under-16	17-20	21 & Over
2012	Siana Schofield	Siana Schofield	Shaz Rahman	Rickey & The Hats
2013	Heidi Browne	Natalie Shay	Wildwood Kin	Heidi Browne
2014	Richard Jones	Tom Auton	James Burrage	Iain Scott
2015	Lola Young	Lola Young	Holly Humphreys	Tre Amici
2016	Sam Clines	Liam Price	Sam Clines	Jonny Olley
2017	James Neilson	Joslyn Plant	Sister & Soul	James Neilson
2018	Reuel Elijah	Rhys & Verity	Alia Lara	Reuel Elijah

Date	Grand Winner	Under-18	Over-18
2019	Natalie Lindi	Leah Turay	Natalie Lindi

== Judging panels ==
- Chris Grayston (2008–present)
- Ras Kwame (2010–present)
- Leon Haynes (2016–present)
- Cece Sammy (2014–present)
- Alex Baker (2014–present)
- James Ellet (2015–present)
- Barney Addison (2015–present)
- Laurence Hobbs (2015–present)
- Layla Manoochehri (2014–present)
- Julie Miles (2018–present)
- Suzanna Dee (2018–present)
- Mark Hill (2008–2014)
- James Meadows (2014–2015)
- James Morgan (2014)
- Gareth Henderson (2008-2015)
- Stuart Slater (2014-2018)
- Simon Keegan (2010–2013)
- Andy Baker (2014)
- Charlie Hedges (2012)
- Si Hulbert (2012)
- Dane Bowers (2010–2012)
- Annie Nightingale (2011–2012)
- E Plus (2011–2012)
- Semper Azeez-Harris(2011)
- Pete Cunnah (2011)
- Shola Ama (2010–2011)
- Lee Latchford-Evans (2010)
- Liz McClarnon (2010)
- James Dakers (2010)
- Vic Bynoe (2010)
- Mesha Bryan (2008–2010)
- Darren Ashford (2009, 2010)
- Paul Stanborough (2010)
- Steve Lyon (2010)

== See also ==
- Open mic
- Live and Unsigned
- Live Fest
- Chris Grayston
