= Hatty Keane =

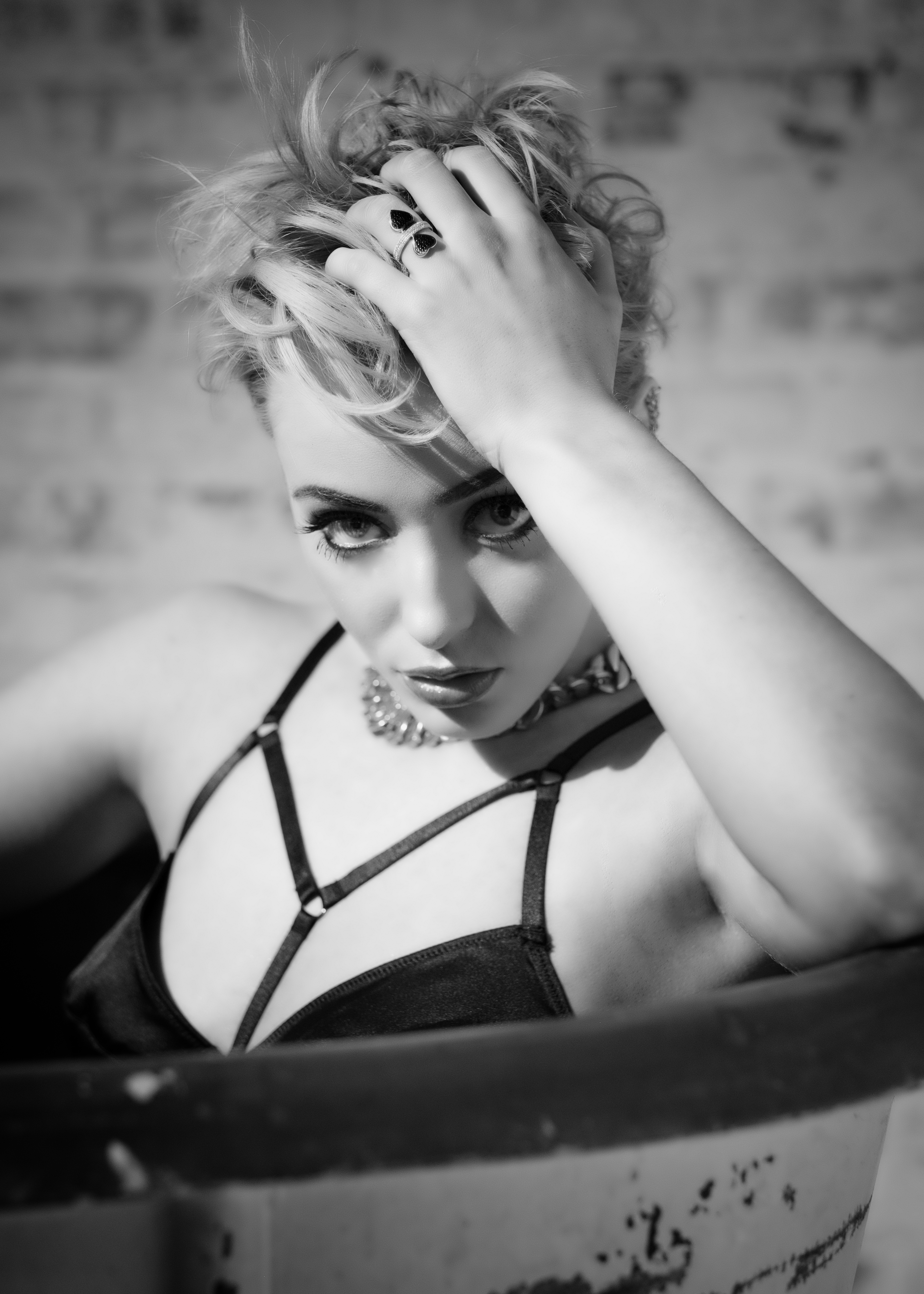

Background information
- Born: 1 December 1994 (age 31); Salford, Greater Manchester, England
- Origin: Macclesfield, Cheshire, England
- Genre: Cinematic Soul
- Years active: 2010–present
- Label: BGM Entertainment
- Website: www.hattyofficial.com

Hatty Keane (born 1 December 1994) is an English singer-songwriter.

== Early life ==
Keane was born in Salford, Greater Manchester. She is based in Macclesfield.

== Music career ==
=== BGM Entertainment ===
In January 2011, Keane signed to BGM Entertainment. On 23 June, she performed alongside Tinchy Stryder at Live Fest at the O2 in London. November 2011 saw Keane perform alongside Ed Sheeran and Wretch 32 at Proud O2. In December 2013 Keane supported JLS on their 'Farewell' tour spanning arenas across the UK. In 2014 Hatty featured on MarkMeets Magazine and discussed the JLS tour. In December 2015 Keane's vocals featured on the Boohoo Christmas TV Advertisement 'We Are Family'. In April 2017, Keane performed at Forbes Magazine's 30 under 30 summit in Israel at the Tower of David. She has released a number of singles "Pointless", "ME!", "Jealous"and "Freedom".

=== Releases ===
Keane signed to BGM Entertainment in 2011. Her first single "Pointless," was released on 8 September 2017. Further releases include "ME!" March 2018, "Jealous" November 2018, "Man About Town" February 2019 and "Freedom" May 2019.
