= Osfest =

Music festival in England

- Poster from the 2014 Osfest
- Genre: Pop, indie, rock
- Dates: 2010: 29–31 May; 2011: 27–30 May; 2012: 1–4 June
- Locations: Oswestry Showground, Oswestry, England, United Kingdom
- Years active: 2010–2014
- Website: http://osfest.co.uk

Osfest was an annual music festival held at Oswestry Showground, organised by Seventh Sense Management.

== History ==
Plans for the festival were made public in December 2009. The first show took place in 2010 and featured headliner Lemar alongside a variety of local and national acts. In 2014, the festival was postponed until August, reportedly due to difficulty booking acts in May. Following the 2014 edition the organisers announced that the festival would not return for 2015 and for the foreseeable future.

== Location ==
Osfest was held on the outskirts of the Shropshire market town Oswestry. The showground is host to a variety of farming markets throughout the year, including the Oswestry Show.
