= Live and Unsigned =

British music competition

- 2011 version of logo
- Genre: Music Competition
- Begins: Sept
- Ends: July
- Frequency: Annually
- Location: United Kingdom
- Years active: 19
- Inaugurated: 2007
- Most recent: 2012
- Participants: 40,000 annually
- Website: liveandunsigned.org

Live and Unsigned is a music competition in the United Kingdom for unsigned bands and vocal groups to perform live for substantial prizes. It was founded 2007, and has attracted over 40,000 entrants annually since its inception. Competitors perform in their own genre and style to a paying audience and judging panel. The competition tours the UK holding auditions and finals in various areas and regions, and the Grand National Final is held in London The O2 in London being the last used.

== History ==
Live and Unsigned was founded in 2007, in the United Kingdom. Singers and bands perform original music live in front of a judging panel and live audience. Chris Grayston promoted the event and served as head judge until 2012.

As of 2013, Live and Unsigned came now under the management of Mercury Artist Management, Daniel O'Gorman, Mongasta International and Lonesome Road. The new management team implemented significant changes to the submissions process, voting, advertising and PR which they feel make it a far more Musician-Friendly Competition.

As of March 2013, Grayston is no longer associated with the competition.

The original company was dissolved in 2014.

The competition in the North East of England and moving through the regions to London in mid 2019. It is a new style format, with 21st-century technology and Stadia and Live Music venues forming the basis of auditions and finals.

The first regional final is set to take place at Sunderlands Stadium of Light after a length of 5 years off the scene.

== Organisation ==
Auditions are held in 3 areas within a region Panels of judges travel attend area finals, with bands then playing regional heats. The winning acts from each regional final then compete in the National Grand Final.

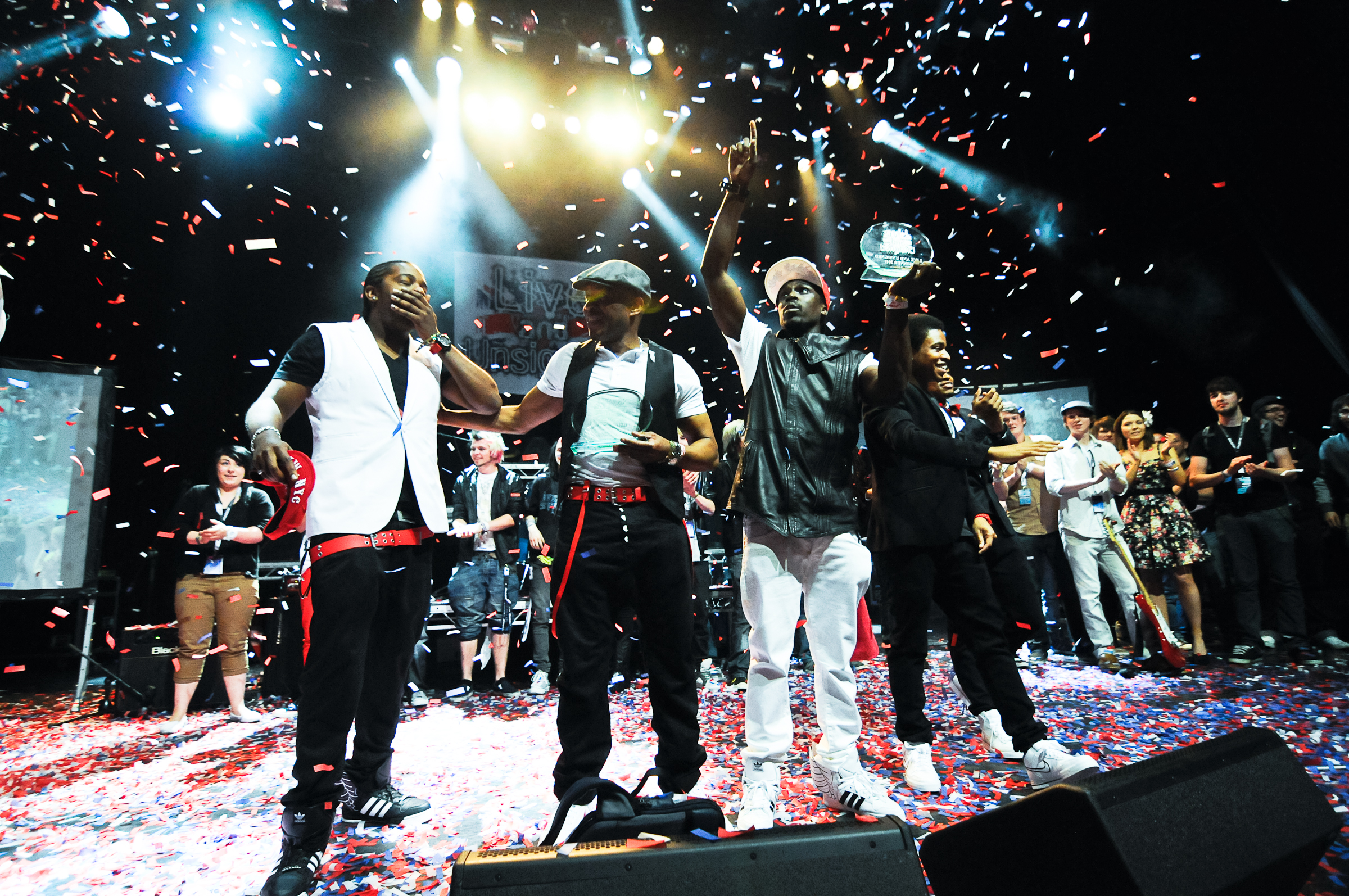
2011 winners The Trinity Band at the Grand Final

=== Categories ===
Applicants can compete in, amongst other genres, Indie, Urban/Pop/Acoustic, Alternative, and Rock categories. There is a new section for DJ's to rent a set. Competitors can win the categories of best Unsigned Indie, Urban/Pop/Acoustic, Alternative and Rock act, and compete for the overall title of Best Live and Unsigned Act.

=== Prizes ===
The overall winner of the competition is offered a recording and a management contract, as well as an investment to release a single. The 2011 investment prize was £100,000 and an opportunity for a world tour. The grand winner earned a £50,000 recording deal. The winners of all the different categories are invited on the UK Live and Unsigned Tour. There are regional prizes, many prizes are industry specific and also for the benefit and enhancement of the winners music career, tours, supports, cash, studio time etc.

=== Judges ===
The Live and Unsigned judging panels have included:

- Chris Grayston (2007–2012)
- Mike King
- Malcolm McLaren
- Dane Bowers (2008, 2009, 2010)
- Malcolm McLaren (2009) (former Sex Pistols manager)
- Annie Nightingale (2009, 2010, 2011)
- Shola Ama (2010, 2011)
- Tom Deacon (2011)
- Daniel P. Carter (2011, of BBC Radio 1)
- Adam Perry (2011, 2012 of Bloodhound Gang)
- Ras Kwame (2010, 2011, 2012 of BBC Radio 1Xtra)
- Tina Campbell (2012) of Craveonmusic

== Annual events ==
=== 2007 ===
The 2007 Grand Final was held in May 2007 at Portsmouth Guildhall to an audience of 2,200 and the competition was divided into age categories. 2007 regional winners included Sean Rumsey. The beat-boxing duet Ghoodfellaz'z, who won the North West region competition, won the Urban Award at the National Grand Final. Hardly Heroes won the under-17s Best Band Award, Fizz Reynolds won the Under 18's Award for female singer and the overall under 18's award and 13-year-old Jake Ward won the Under-18 category for boys. B-Kay and Kazz were awarded the best Live and Unsigned vocal group.

=== 2008 ===
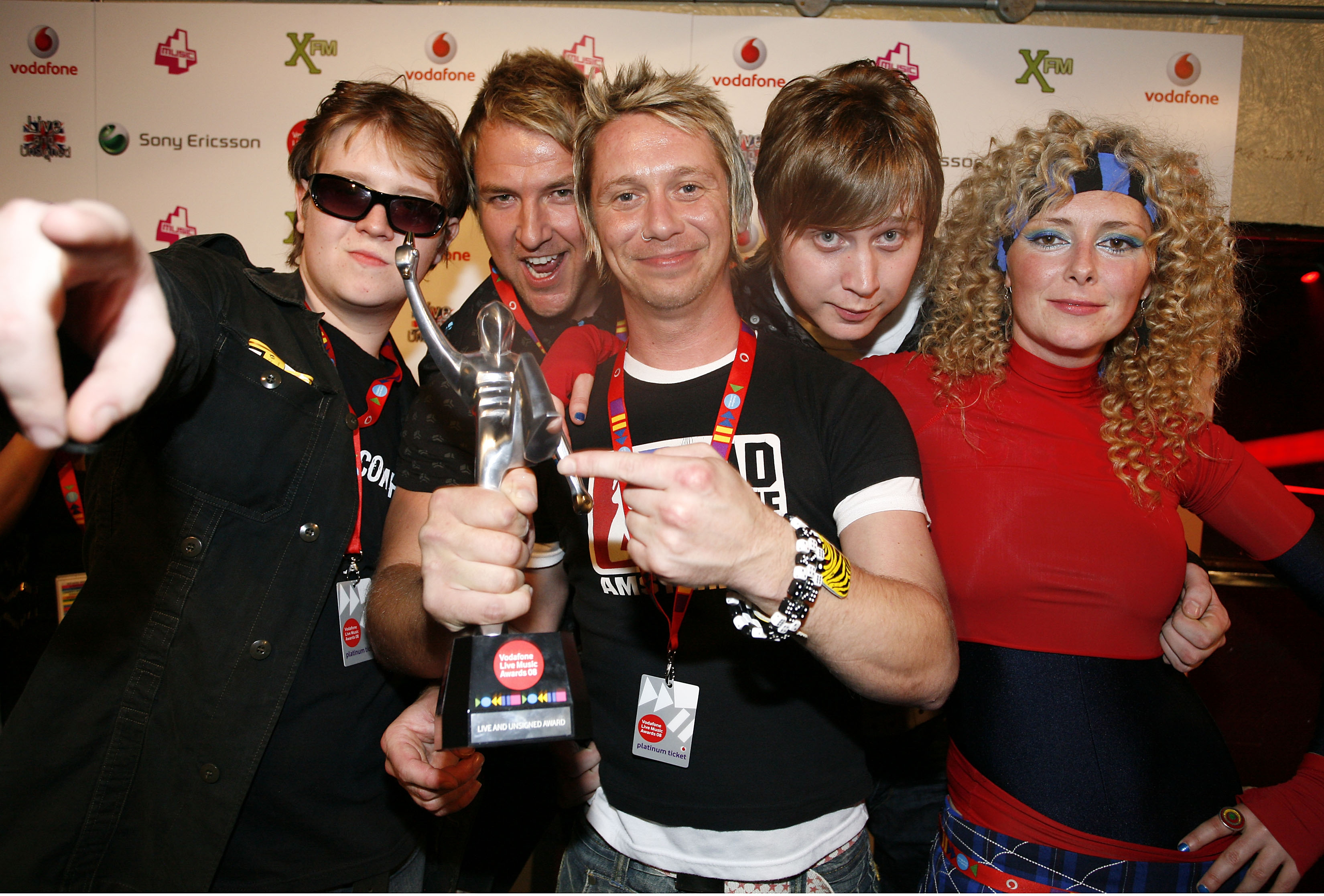
2008 Live and Unsigned winners Kiddo360

In 2008 Welsh indie/electronic band Kiddo360 won the Grand Final, and went on to win a Vodafone Award.

=== 2009 ===
Auditions for 2009 began that January. Because of high demand, auditions were limited to 500 per region. regional finals took place across the UK and each act performed one cover song and one original song.

The London singer RHEA won her Under-18 category at the Finals. Overall winners of the Rock section of the competition were The Detours. The Loaded Dice won the Indie/Pop category, but later declined the contract.

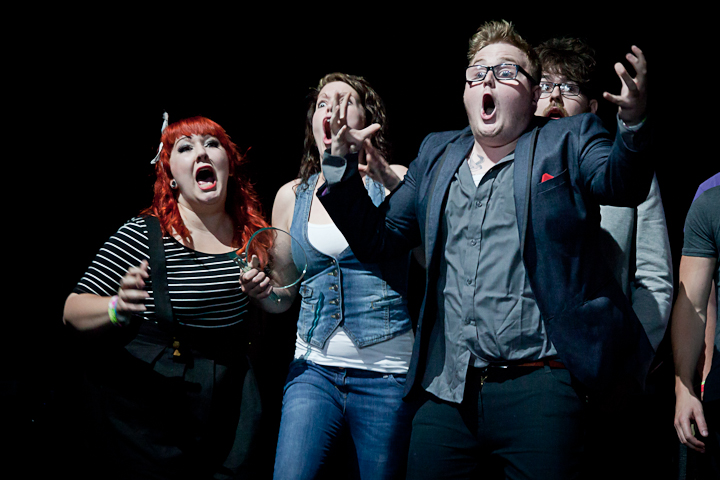
The Lottery Winners hearing they have won in 2010

=== 2010 ===
In 2010 the Grand Final for 2010 took place at the Indig02 at The O2 Arena in London. Category winners for 2010 included rock band Underline The Sky, acoustic act Sam Garrett, and alternative group We Beat The System. The judges voted Indie band The Lottery Winners as overall winner.

=== 2011 ===
The National Grand Final in 2011 took place at the Indig02 on 23 July, as part of Live Fest at the O2. The Live Fest event also included performances from Zane Lowe, The Hoosiers, Tinchy Stryder, Roll Deep, Tempa T, The Guillemots, Funeral For A Friend, and Kids In Glass Houses. The Filthy Habits won the Indie category, The Robbie Boyd Band won the Alternative category, The Trinity Band won the Urban, Pop, and Acoustic category, and Loud and Proud won the Rock category.

Another winner in 2011 was overall runner-up Lucy Spraggan, who was initially offered a festival slot in Australia as part of her prize. When the festival was cancelled, organisers at Live and Unsigned offered Lucy alternative prizes including a string of guest act spots at Live and Unsigned and Open Mic UK shows across the country, a new website, a music video, which at the time of writing has received over 455,000 views, and as a result gained several additional festival slots amongst which included London Summer Jam, Osfest, Strawberry Fields Festival, Cockermouth Rock Festival.

Lucy went to on achieve a Top 20 single with Last Night, reaching number 2 by the start of the week but finished in at 11th in the Official UK Singles Charts on 2 September 2012. despite being removed from iTunes

=== 2012 ===
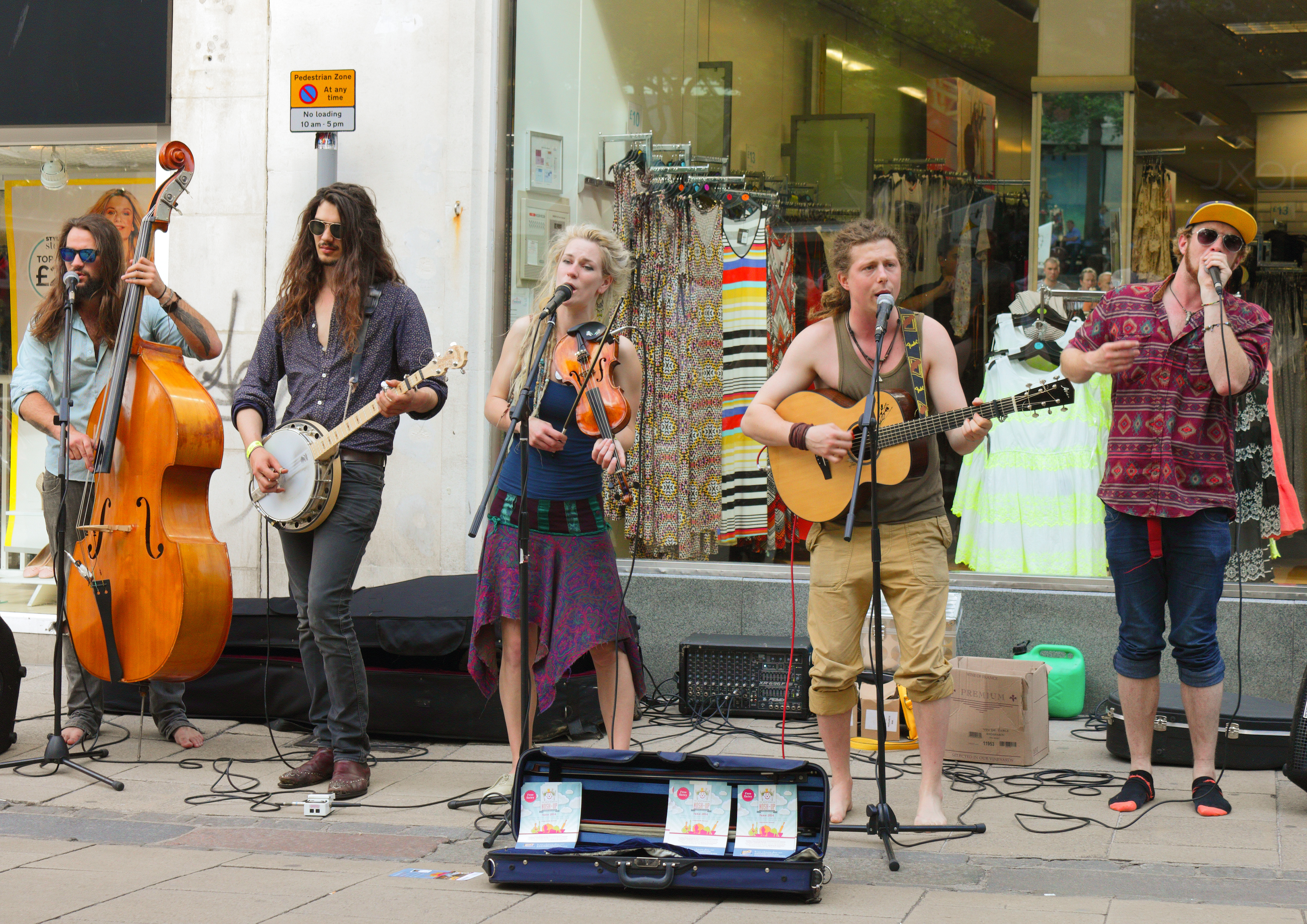
CoCo and the Butterfields 2014 in Norwich (photo by Roger Blackwell)

The National Grand Final in 2012 took place at the Proud2 in The O2 on 14 July, Contraband won the Rock/Metal category, winning themselves a festival slot at Butserfest and a free Natal Drums drum kit. Leon Bratt won the Acoustic/Solo category, winning himself festival slots at JustSoFestival and Looe Music Festival, as well as free studio time. Molly Smitten-Downes won the Urban/Pop category, winning herself a slot at Sundown Festival as well as free studio time. CoCo and the Butterfields won the Indie/Alternative category, winning themselves a £2,000 Fret King endorsement, a free TC Electronic amp and a festival slot at Tour Music Fest in Rome.

As overall winners, CoCo and the Butterfields were offered £10,000 to spend on the development of their music and a tour of up to 18 festivals, other prizes for CoCo and the Butterfields over the course of the competition included; free studio time, a free Blackstar Amplification amplifier, a free Vintage guitar, a slot at Paddle Round The Pier, and a slot at Beach Break Live.
