= Ras Kwame =

British musician

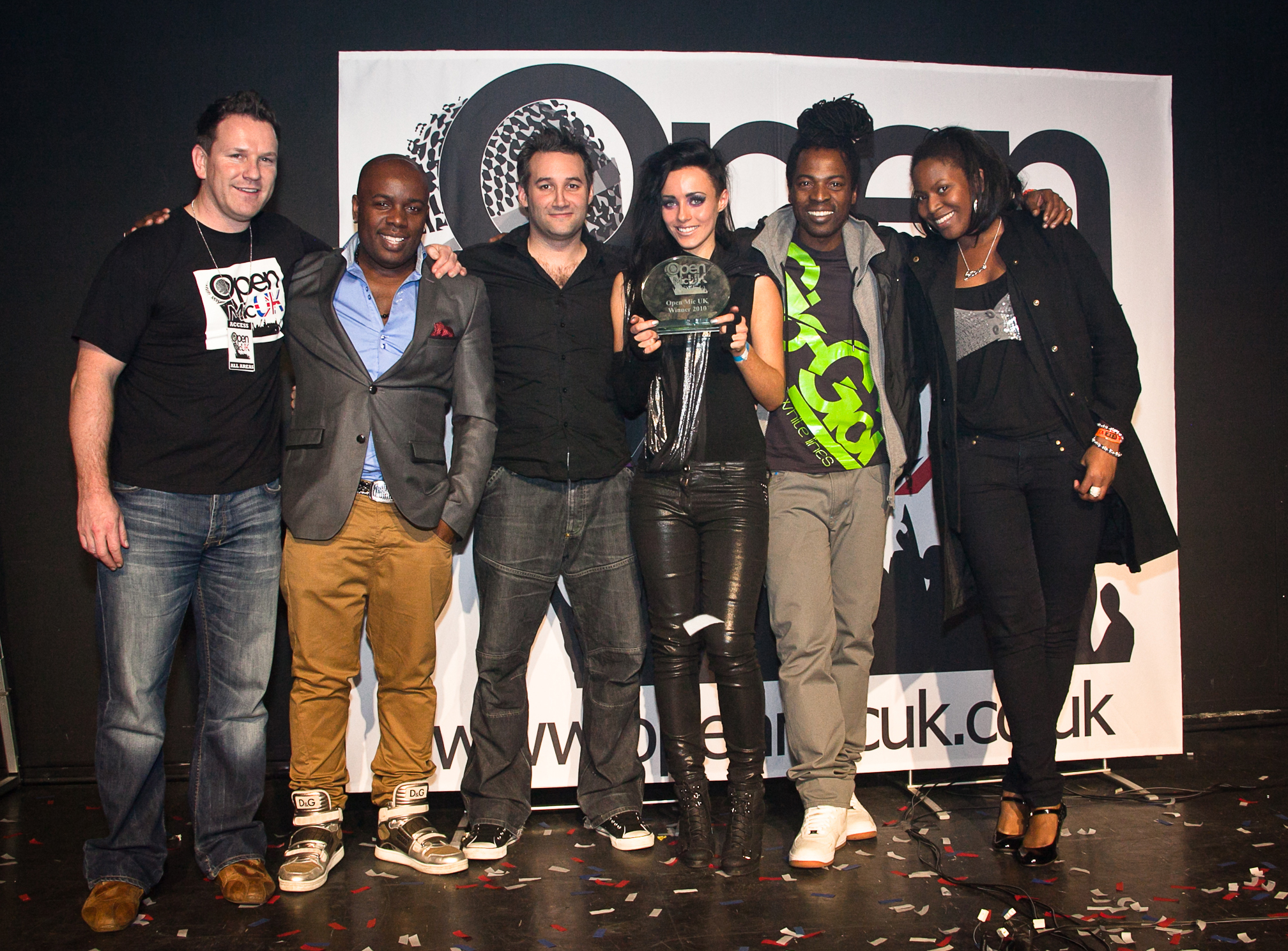
Ras Kwame (centre) as judge at Open Mic UK, 2010

Ras Kwame is a British musician, record producer, radio DJ and presenter of Ghanaian heritage.

== Biography ==
Ras Kwame was born in Hammersmith, London, and at the age of 11 moved to Ghana. He returned to London after doing his A-levels, and studied economics at City of London Polytechnic.

He started in the music industry as a club DJ playing hip hop, R&B and reggae in the early 1990s. He then moved on to promoting for Kiss100's groundbreaking Starlight Club night and the Mean Fiddler's Subterranea Club, bringing over talent from the US and promoting local talent. The Subterranea gigs saw Kwame take control of the turntables for artists such as Gang Starr, Public Enemy, Wu Tang Clan, London Posse and the Fugees. During that time, Ras also undertook remix work for Chanté Moore, George McCrae and The 49ers.

Kwame founded West London's Sugar Shack record shop in 1993 and from 1994 to 2000 he had formed Baby Shack Recordings and his UK garage production outfit M-Dubs. As a garage producer, Kwame made several innovative underground club anthems for the flourishing UKG scene, such as "Over Here" featuring Ritchie Dan, "Bump and Grind" featuring Lady Saw and the underground smash "Body Killin" by The Vincent Alvis Project. In 2001, Kwame launched the International Rude Bwoy Recordings operation; the label maintains a UK black music output with a variety of styles ranging from hip hop to garage.

Ras Kwame joined BBC Radio 1Xtra at launch in 2002 with the 100% Homegrown show every Sunday evening. The show was dedicated to the sound of UK black music and provided a live platform for talent and gave major support to new acts like Lethal B, Skinnyman and Estelle.

In 2004, Kwame won Best Radio DJ at the Urban Music Awards and started a new music show called Showtime with Ras Kwame on Channel U.

In February 2005, Kwame was brought into BBC Radio 1 to host one of the three OneMusic shows every Sunday morning from 5 am to 7 am that succeeded the John Peel slot. The other OneMusic hosts were Rob da Bank and Huw Stephens. It was later announced that Kwame was leaving Radio 1 and 1Xtra as part of schedule changes in January 2011.

In January 2013, he joined Capital Xtra and presented The Midnight Mix Tuesdays to Fridays from midnight to 3 am.

However, in October 2016, as part of the station's schedule change, he now only appears on Sunday nights with Reggae Recipe from 10pm until 1am

He regularly judges both Open Mic UK and Live and Unsigned.
