= Music competition =

Contest that rewards the best musical performer

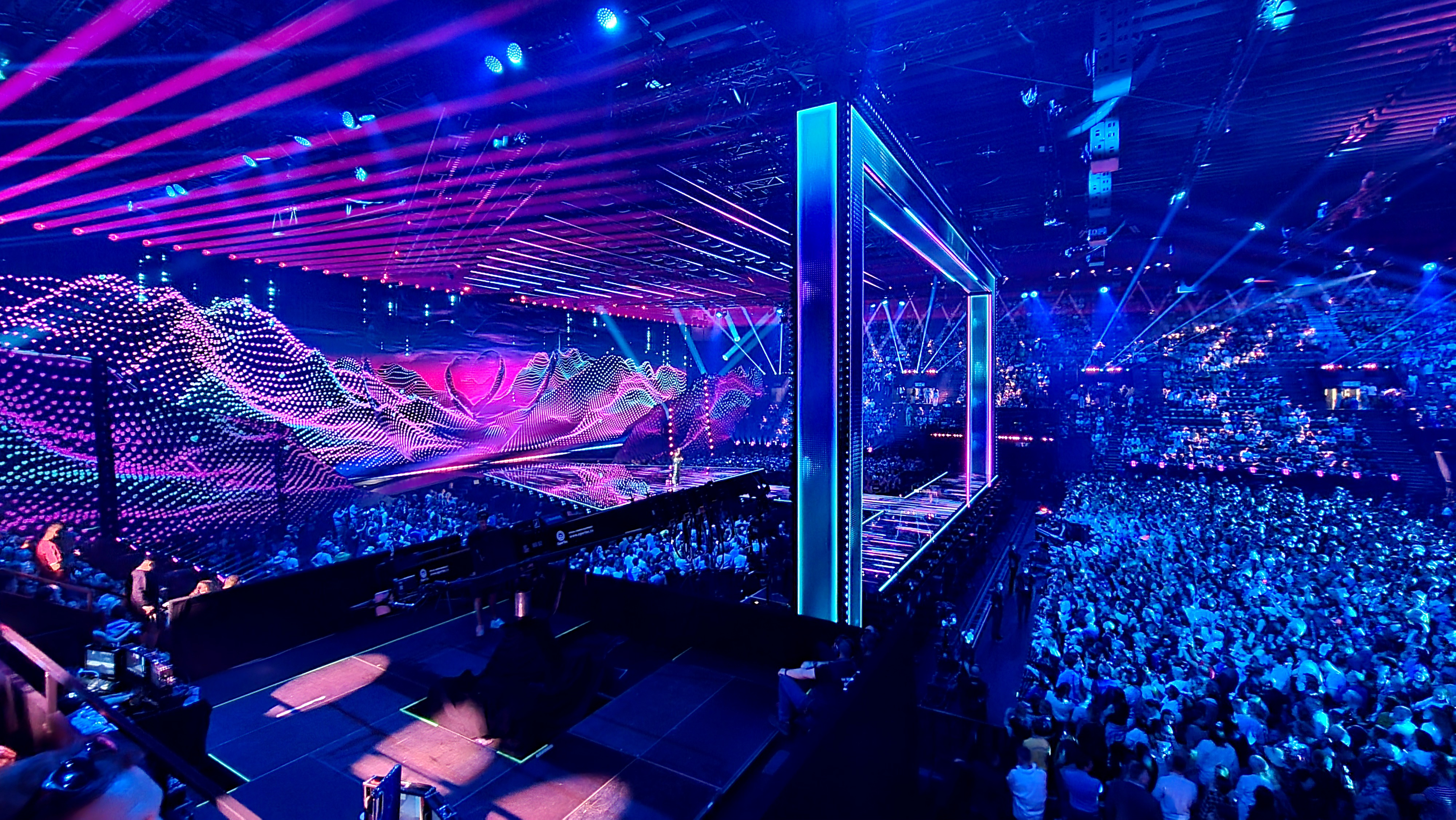
The Eurovision Song Contest in 2025, an example of a music competition

A music competition is a public event designed to identify and award outstanding musical ensembles, soloists, composers, conductors, musicologists or compositions. Pop music competitions are music competitions which are held to find pop starlets.

Examples of music competitions in popular music include the Eurovision Song Contest, the Sanremo Music Festival, Open Mic UK, the All-Japan Band Association annual contest, Live and Unsigned, and American Idol.

== History ==
European classical art music uses competitions to provide a public forum that identifies the strongest young players and helps them start their professional careers (see List of classical music competitions). Popular instrumental ensembles such as brass bands and school bands have also long relied on competitions and festivals to promote their musical genres and recognize high levels of achievement. In the recent decades, large competitions have also developed in the field of popular music to showcase performances by pop vocalists and rock bands (e.g. "Idol (franchise)" and "Battle of the bands" events).

One of the first and oldest large-scale musical contests is the Sanremo Music Festival, which started in 1951 and was also the inspiration for the Eurovision Song Contest.

== Examples ==
The music competitions with the largest Audiences are widely televised events in the genre of popular music, such as the Eurovision Song Contest and American Idol. The Open Mic UK and Live and Unsigned contests in the United Kingdom each garner approximately 10,000 contestants annually, making them the largest contests in the region.

According to 2005 statistics, more than 650,000 visitors attend the World Music Contest (Kerkrade, the Netherlands), which has 19,000 contestants from over 30 countries, making it one of the largest competitions in Europe. The All-Japan Band Association annual contest appears to be the world's largest music competition in terms of the number of active contestants, with approximately 800,000 competing musicians in more than 14,000 bands. A competition that has recently hit the United Kingdom music scene is called the SoundWave Music Competition. This competition allows for singers, bands, and all acts of all genres a chance to play at the O2 Academy Leeds, Newcastle and Glasgow. SoundWave Music Competition is a high-profile competition and the biggest music competition in Northern England and Scotland where entrants can win radio slots and recording within the best recording studios in the United Kingdom and Scotland. One of the oldest music competitions in the world is the International Naumburg Competition, in New York, which had its first competition in 1926. In recent years, the largest music competition in terms of number of global genres represented appears to be Sharq Taronalari, an enormous festival sponsored by UNESCO and the government of Uzbekistan. Various online music competitions for young musicians are now gaining popularity, including Unsigned Only, which is a global music contest based in United States, and Machan Music, an open and ongoing music contest based in India. The Songwriters Resource Network organizes the annual Great American Song Contest which is open to songwriters and lyric writers internationally.

== See also ==
- List of classical music competitions
- Battle of the bands
- Idols
- The X Factor
- The Voice
