= Nicola Roberts discography =

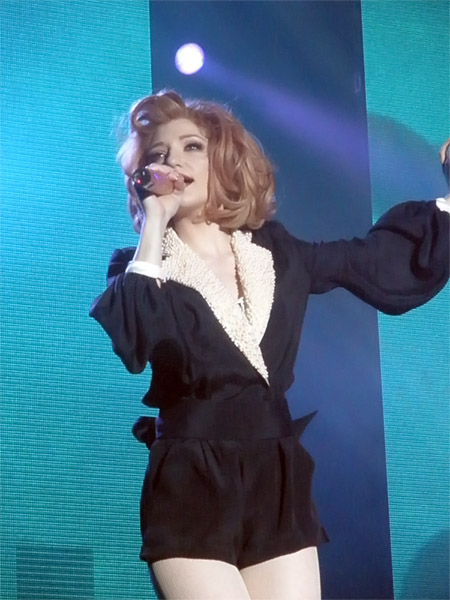
- Roberts performing with Girls Aloud in 2009
- Studio albums: 1
- Singles: 3
- Music videos: 3

The discography of British singer Nicola Roberts consists of one studio album, three singles, and three music videos.

In the 2008 biography of Girls Aloud, Roberts expressed an interest in writing and recording her own material, wanting to experiment in the studio for better understanding of the process. She then started work in the recording studio, with producers such as; Dragonette, Diplo and Joseph Mount. Roberts after a year of recording announced that she would be releasing her debut album, Cinderella's Eyes. The first single "Beat of My Drum" had an on-sale release meaning it had little promotion beforehand and commercially it peaked at number 27 in the United Kingdom but critically it garnered acclaim from critics which Roberts described as "amazing".

A second single "Lucky Day" was released shortly after and whilst gaining positive reviews it failed to make an impact commercially peaking at number 40 in the UK. The album was then released on 23 September 2011, Roberts described the album as "electronically lead", and the album was inspired by her time performing with Girls Aloud – "It would have been stupid for me to make an album that meant nothing" she said. For Roberts the album was about making a risky record, where there wasn't a guaranteed commercial success, explaining to The Guardian: "It's taken every last bit of confidence just to release this record, or maybe I've just brainwashed myself into feeling more confident. I don't know if it's good, or if I've just told myself it's good."

The album was released to universal positive reviews from critics, reviewers such as Ludovic Hunter-Tilney of the Financial Times, James Lachno of The Daily Telegraph, Emily Mackay of NME, Hugh Montgomery of The Independent and others hailed it as the best solo record from a member of Girls Aloud. Commercially in the United Kingdom the album peaked at number 17 whilst on the digital charts it peaked at number 13, in Scotland it charted at number 21 whilst in Ireland it peaked at number 48. On 6 January a third single from the album was released, titled "Yo-Yo". The song was described as a "shining example of her pop sensibilities".

In October 2011, Roberts stated that she is working on creating music and is 'happy' for other artists to use tracks that didn't make the cut on her solo album. On 13 January 2012, Roberts commented on the possibility of a second album, saying, "Maybe. I'm not sure. There's lots of stuff coming up and I think there always has to be a right time. I'm always working on music and if a second album came out then that would be a great thing to happen." In October 2017, Roberts stated that she would begin to work more on her own music, as well as other artists. In February 2018, she confirmed that she is currently in the process of writing a second solo record.

== Albums ==
=== Studio albums ===
List of studio albums, with selected chart positions
Title	Album details	Peak chart positions			Sales
Title	Album details	UK	IRE	SCO	Sales
Cinderella's Eyes	Released: 23 September 2011; Label: Polydor; Formats: CD, DD, LP	17	48	21	UK: 50,000

=== Reissues ===
List of studio albums, with details
Title	Album details
Behind Cinderella's Eyes	Released: 28 January 2021; Label: Plastic Pop; Formats: CD, LP

== Singles ==
List of singles, with selected chart positions, showing year released and album name
Title	Year	Peak chart positions			Album
Title	Year	UK	IRE	SCO	Album
"Beat of My Drum"	2011	27	37	26	Cinderella's Eyes
"Lucky Day"	2011	40	—	40	Cinderella's Eyes
"Yo-Yo"	2012	111	—	—	Cinderella's Eyes

== Music videos ==
Year	Song	Director	Album
2011	"Beat of My Drum"	Wendy Morgan	Cinderella's Eyes
2011	"Lucky Day"	Stephen Agnes	Cinderella's Eyes
2011	"Yo-Yo"	Frederike Helwig	Cinderella's Eyes

== Writing credits ==
Year	Song	Artist	Album
2004	"Big Brother"	Girls Aloud	What Will the Neighbours Say?
2004	"Hear Me Out"	Girls Aloud	What Will the Neighbours Say?
2004	"Thank Me Daddy"	Girls Aloud	What Will the Neighbours Say?
2004	"I Say a Prayer for You"	Girls Aloud	What Will the Neighbours Say?
2004	"100 Different Ways"	Girls Aloud	What Will the Neighbours Say?
2005	"It's Magic"	Girls Aloud	Chemistry
2007	"Sexy! No No No..."	Girls Aloud	Tangled Up
2007	"Crocodile Tears"	Girls Aloud	Tangled Up
2008	"Love Is the Key"	Girls Aloud	Out of Control
2008	"Miss You Bow Bow"	Girls Aloud	Out of Control
2008	"Revolution in the Head"	Girls Aloud	Out of Control
2008	"Live in the Country"	Girls Aloud	Out of Control
2008	"Memory of You"	Girls Aloud	The Loving Kind
2010	"Dating"	Nicola Roberts	N/A
2010	"Nothing"	Nicola Roberts	N/A
2011	"Beat of My Drum"	Nicola Roberts	Cinderella's Eyes
2011	"Lucky Day"	Nicola Roberts	Cinderella's Eyes
2011	"Yo-Yo"	Nicola Roberts	Cinderella's Eyes
2011	"Cinderella's Eyes"	Nicola Roberts	Cinderella's Eyes
2011	"Porcelain Heart"	Nicola Roberts	Cinderella's Eyes
2011	"I"	Nicola Roberts	Cinderella's Eyes
2011	"Say It Out Loud"	Nicola Roberts	Cinderella's Eyes
2011	"Gladiator"	Nicola Roberts	Cinderella's Eyes
2011	"Fish Out of Water"	Nicola Roberts	Cinderella's Eyes
2011	"Take a Bite"	Nicola Roberts	Cinderella's Eyes
2011	"Sticks and Stones"	Nicola Roberts	Cinderella's Eyes
2011	"Disco, Blisters & a Comedown"	Nicola Roberts	"Beat of My Drum" single
2011	"Fix Me"	Nicola Roberts	Lucky Day EP
2012	"Something New"	Girls Aloud	Ten
2012	"On the Metro"	Girls Aloud	Ten
2012	"Going Nowhere"	Little Mix	DNA
2013	"See Me Now"	Little Mix	Salute
2013	"They Just Don't Know You"	Little Mix	Salute
2014	"It's About Time"	Cheryl	Only Human
2014	"Throwback"	Cheryl	Only Human
2014	"Goodbye Means Hello"	Cheryl	Only Human
2014	"Yellow Love"	Cheryl	Only Human
2014	"Girlfriends"	Joel Compass	—N/a
2016	"Take You to Heaven"	Nina Nesbitt	Modern Love EP
2016	"Talk"	Tiffany Hwang	I Just Wanna Dance
2016	"Ghetto Boy"	Tinashe	Nightride
2016	"One Eye on the Door"	Professor Green	—N/a
2017	"Dear Rich, Thank You"	Lethal Bizzle	You'll Never Make a Million from Grime EP
2017	"Lucky"	Moksi & Chase Feat. Yade Lauren	—N/a
2017	"Redlight"	Tayá	Tayá
2018	"Love Made Me Do It"	Cheryl	—N/a
2019	"Let You"	Cheryl	—N/a
2019	"2 Steps"	Antigoni	A1 EP
2019	"No Goodbye"	Paul Kalkbrenner	—N/a
2020	"Sleep with Open Eyes"	Nicola Roberts	—N/a
2022	Crash	Nicola Roberts	Behind Cinderella's Eyes
2022	"Head"	Nicola Roberts	Behind Cinderella's Eyes
2022	"Heart Racing"	Nicola Roberts	Behind Cinderella's Eyes
2022	"Pipe Dreams"	Nicola Roberts	Behind Cinderella's Eyes
2022	"So Damn Right"	Nicola Roberts	Behind Cinderella's Eyes
2022	"Tomorrow"	Nicola Roberts	Behind Cinderella's Eyes
