= Yo-Yo (Nicola Roberts song) =

Single by Nicola Roberts

from the album Cinderella's Eyes
- B-side: "Memory of You" (Solo version); "Sticks + Stones" (Demo)
- Released: 6 January 2012
- Recorded: 2011
- Genre: Electropop; dance-pop
- Length: 3:26
- Label: Polydor
- Songwriters: Nicola Roberts, Dimitri Tikovoi, Maya Von Doll
- Producer: Dimitri Tikovoi

Nicola Roberts singles chronology
"Lucky Day" (2011)	"Yo-Yo" (2012)

"Yo-Yo" is a song by British recording artist Nicola Roberts, released as the third and final single from Roberts' debut solo album Cinderella's Eyes on 6 January 2012. Originally, "Yo-Yo" was set to be Roberts' debut single, but "Beat of My Drum" was selected in its place. "Beat of My Drum" and "Lucky Day", Roberts' previous singles, garnered positive comments from critics, but failed to impact commercially. "Yo-Yo" was written by Roberts, Maya Von Doll and Dimitri Tikovoi while it was produced by latter, and was the first song to be composed by the group. Roberts also claimed the track had defined her musical style.

"Yo-Yo" is a 1950s-themed electropop and synth-pop song in which Roberts sings about an undecided lover. The song received positive reviews from critics, who compared Roberts' vocals to those of singer Kate Bush. Commercially, it was a failure, charting at number 111 on the UK Singles Chart. A music video was released on 30 November 2011; the video sees Roberts repeatedly changing outfit for a party in which she finds her love interest cheating on her, ending with an aggressive confrontation. It garnered positive critical responses although the low-budget drew criticism. Roberts performed "Yo-Yo" on the Alan Titchmarsh Show, among other occasions.

== Background and writing ==
Nicola Roberts, who began her musical career as one fifth of the band Girls Aloud, struggled with loneliness and increasing isolation during her time with the group. A busy schedule and constant media criticism found her describing the time as a "blur". Her exhaustion and troubles with negative media comments led to a state in which she had to harden herself, claiming that inside she was "dying". These events inspired her debut album Cinderella's Eyes. "Yo-Yo" was the first song she had written with Maya von Doll and Dimitri Tikovoi for the album. The recording was also one of the first songs Roberts wrote, and it helped define her musical style. Roberts blogged about the production of the track, writing that:

The production’s incredible. The beat is just so constant and powerful. That was the first song that I wrote with Dimitri and Maya. I felt like I’d found my sound. And I was kind of looking at it like an outfit. So it was, 'if this was an outfit, what would this song need now?’ So we had the pretty dress, which was the chorus. We had the lovely shoes, which was the verse. 'But what do we need to really set this song off? A big, fancy, bow in the hair would really set this song off.' So when I got to the middle eight I wanted to go really erratic, almost like taTu on All The Things She Said. I wanted it to be proper fucked up and crazy – hands in the air.

== Release ==
Roberts' debut single, "Beat of My Drum", garnered acclaim from critics, but failed to impact commercially, charting at 27 in the United Kingdom. She released a follow-up single, "Lucky Day", which likewise garnered positive responses, but was even less successful commercially, charting at number 40 on both the Scottish and UK Singles charts. Writing as a guest blogger on the website Holy Moly in September 2011, Roberts announced that "Yo-Yo" would be released as the third single from Cinderella's Eyes, initially citing a November release date; the release was later delayed until January 2012. Roberts had originally intended for "Yo-Yo" to be the first single from the album, but "Beat of My Drum" was instead chosen at the "last minute". Roberts stated that "it felt right to go with" the latter song. "Yo-Yo" was released digitally on 2 January 2012, with Roberts announcing on her official website that the single would be released in CD format featuring a live performance of the song in addition to the demo version of her song "Sticks + Stones" seven days later. Additionally, two EPs were released on 6 January 2012.

== Composition and critical reception ==
"Yo-Yo"
A 20 second sample of the song's 1950-inspired chorus, which features a vocal performance similar to the ones of Kate Bush.

"Yo-Yo" features 808 drums with a "dramatic" 1950s-inspired pop "pastiche". However, the 1950s concept "goes completely out of the window" for an "unhinged" bridge, which features a club mix which speeds up the drums featured in the song. The lyrics of the track discuss an uncertain relationship, leading to vulnerability, with Roberts describing it as a "dark" song. The song references a yo-yo; this is a metaphor for Roberts herself, a spinning yo-yo "on the finger of a hot 'n' cold lover". Described as "confessional" by Robert Copsey of Digital Spy, the song has a "conversational" performance, and Roberts' vocals were compared to that of singer Kate Bush.

The song received positive reviews from music critics. Emily Mackay, writing for NME, described the chorus as a "winning" one, and noted that "the impulse-speed space synths are broken-heartedly beguiling". In a separate review, Lisa Wright from NME found that while the song didn't match the success of "Beat of My Drum". Wright said that the song is "Not a cuss-ridden introduction to Nicola’s re-emergence as an English Syd Tha Kyd, but a questionable metaphor about being like a crap '90s toy." Robert Copsey of Digital Spy found Cinderella's Eyes to be "frustratingly under-appreciated" with "Yo-Yo" being a "shining example of [Roberts'] pop sensibilities" calling it "unashamedly radio friendly".

== Music video ==
External videos
- The official "Yo-Yo" music video on YouTube, uploaded by Vevo.

=== Synopsis ===
The video begins with a man performing tricks with a yo-yo in a white room, accompanied by shots showing Roberts in a "fashionable looking house" wearing a black silk dress. Then rapid shots show her in various other outfits, including a purple velvet dress, all the time showing the man performing tricks with the yo-yo. As the chorus begins, Roberts is shown in the kitchen of the house, along with several women dancing with her. Another shot shows a man and a woman walking through a street embracing each other. This is later interspersed with shots of a fully clothed Roberts standing in a shower cubiclem getting increasingly wet. Roberts is shown leaving the house and seeing the man with whom she had danced with another woman. She returns to the house, and the man and Roberts are seen in the kitchen area with Roberts throwing a series of objects at him.

=== Release and reception ===
"The general concept is really all about the story and just following the story of the song. It's a really emotional song... [so] one of the hardest things about today is to take it out of my situation and be able to perform the song through the cameras. I think the song means a lot to a lot of people, so fingers crossed the story really hits home"

— Roberts discussing the concept of the video.

Prior to the release of the video, Roberts released still images to website 3am. These showed her in what was described as "some sort of untidy, yet fashionable looking house", while one showed her with her legs above her head wearing "Kandee's caramel kisses shoes" and a third and final seeing her "cosying up next to a handsome chap". The same day, Roberts gave two more exclusive stills to website Digital Spy; in one image, she was smelling roses, while, in the second, she was "playing with a pair of shoes". The video was released on 30 November 2011. Katherine St Asaph, of Pop Dust, found that the video's low budget had had a negative effect. She interpreted scenes with Roberts repeated changes clothing positively, noting "[i]t works because of the lyrics – what, besides other people, can mess with your feelings more than trying on clothes?"

== Live performances ==
She pre-recorded a performance of "Yo-Yo" for UK television programme The Alan Titchmarsh Show during the same taping as a performance of "Lucky Day". The taping came after deciding "Yo-Yo" would be released as the third single from the album, with Roberts saying, "I absolutely love performing Yo-Yo, it's my favourite one to do [...] So I feel really close to Yo-Yo. I feel like I lose myself when I'm performing it". After the release of the single, Roberts performed on The Album Chart Show during a special dedicated to her, performing three tracks: "Yo-Yo", "Beat of My Drum" and "Sticks + Stones". Roberts also performed the song on British chat show Loose Women and on the Digital Music Awards.

== Charts ==
"Yo-Yo" debuted at its peak of number 111 on the UK Singles Chart.

Chart (2012)	Peak position
UK Singles (Official Charts Company)	111

== Formats and track-listings ==
- CD single
1. "Yo-Yo" (Engine Room session) – 3:20
2. "Lucky Day" (Engine Room sessions) – 3:19
3. "I" (Engine Room sessions) – 3:42
4. "Sticks + Stones" (Engine Room sessions) – 4:15
5. "Sticks + Stones" (Demo) – 2:15
- EP
1. "Yo-Yo" (Clean Radio mix) – 3:24
2. "Yo-Yo" (High Level radio edit) – 3:42
3. "Yo-Yo" (High Level club mix) – 6:37
4. "Yo-Yo" (JRMX radio edit) – 3:54
5. "Yo-Yo" (JRMX club mix) – 5:59
6. "Memory of You" (Solo version) (pre-order only) – 3:47
- Engine Rooms sessions EP
1. "Yo-Yo" (Engine Room sessions) – 3:31
2. "Lucky Day" (Engine Room sessions) – 3:19
3. "I" (Engine Room sessions) – 3:42
4. "Sticks + Stones" (Engine Room sessions) – 4:14

== Release history ==
Region	Date	Label	Format
Ireland	6 January 2012	Polydor Records	Digital download
United Kingdom	6 January 2012	Polydor Records	Digital download
United Kingdom	9 January 2012	Polydor Records	CD single
