= Styled to Rock =

Styled to Rock may refer to:

- Styled to Rock (British TV series), a 2012 reality competition series
- Styled to Rock (American TV series), a 2013 series based on the British series
