= Beat of My Drum =

2011 debut single by Nicola Roberts

Single by Nicola Roberts

from the album Cinderella's Eyes
- B-side: "Disco, Blisters and a Comedown"; "Porcelain Heart"
- Released: 2 June 2011
- Recorded: July 2010
- Genre: Synth-pop; alternative dance
- Length: 2:56
- Label: Polydor
- Songwriters: Nicola Roberts; Maya von Doll; Wesley Pentz; Dimitri Tikovoï
- Producers: Dimitri Tikovoï; Diplo; Derek Allen

Nicola Roberts singles chronology
"Beat of My Drum" (2011)	"Lucky Day" (2011)

Audio sample
- file; help

Music video
- "Beat of My Drum" on YouTube

"Beat of My Drum" is a song by British recording artist Nicola Roberts. It was released on 2 June 2011, by Polydor Records, as the lead single from Roberts' debut solo album, Cinderella's Eyes (2011). The song was simultaneously released with the on air on sale method, receiving no prior promotion. "Beat of My Drum" was written by Roberts, Dimitri Tikovoï, Maya von Doll and Diplo, and was initially produced by Roberts and Tikovoï. Written to feel British and fun, Roberts intended "Beat of My Drum" to be a song to which people could sing and dance.

"Beat of My Drum" is a dance-pop song which incorporates elements of indie pop, and has been compared to the work of artists including M.I.A. and Major Lazer. Lyrically, the song discusses Roberts' time in the girl band she was a part of, Girls Aloud; while part of the group, she felt undervalued in comparison to other members. "Beat of My Drum" garnered universal acclaim from music critics, with some describing it as more original than solo releases by other members of Girls Aloud; it was also compared to the work of artists such as Kelis and Robyn. Commercially, "Beat of My Drum" failed to make a large impact.

In the United Kingdom, it charted at number 27, and number 26 in Scotland. In Ireland, the song peaked at number 37. The song's accompanying music video was directed by Wendy Morgan. It displayed Roberts performing in a hall with dancers. Roberts performed the song for the first time at the 2011 T4 on the Beach, as well as various other chat shows.

== Background and development ==
Before embarking her solo career, Roberts was one fifth of British girl band Girls Aloud. Roberts claimed that she found the experience of going solo troubling. She revealed that she struggled to cope with life in the public eye and the constant media attention. In particular, she received negative attention concerning her image. The experience led her to start to develop her debut album, which, lyrically, reflected the difficult times she experienced in Girls Aloud. On "Beat of My Drum", Roberts describes herself as a "baby in the corner" - the song's original title. Roberts helped to write all of the tracks on Cinderella's Eyes, with the lyrics telling stories of things that happened in her life. "Beat of My Drum" was co-written with Maya von Doll, Diplo and Dimitri Tikovoï. She stated that she had always wanted "Beat of My Drum" to be something different from the music that other pop singers were presenting in the charts. Roberts stated that "Beat of My Drum" is "a song everyone can sing and dance to". Roberts stated that she felt the song had a "fun concept" with a British influence.

The song was originally recorded by Roberts and Tikovoï. However, Roberts decided to contact producer Diplo to work on the record. Discussing her choice in an interview for The Guardian, Roberts said that she only had one chance to get him to work with her and asked for his assistance. After Diplo reassured the singer that he would help, Roberts revealed that the situation was no longer in her hands and that she would wait for him to contact her with some progress. Communications were limited between the pair, but when Roberts received Diplo's finished production, she was too nervous to listen to it immediately. Instead, she burnt the track to a CD, and drove to a deserted field with her younger brother and sister, where she played the song loudly. After positive responses from her siblings, Roberts declared Diplo a "genius".

== Composition ==
"Beat of My Drum" is a dance-pop track with themes of indie pop, and has been compared to the work of M.I.A. and Daphne and Celeste. The verses, choruses and bridge are all distinctively different; the chorus consists of chants, the verses are spoken-sung (half spoken. half sung), and the bridge is dancehall themed. The bridge gathered comparisons to the music of Major Lazer, which it samples. The vocals are performed against sirens. Music journalist James Montgomery observed how the song "mashes together every notable pop moment from recent history", pointing out the dancehall rhythms, drum breaks and "electro-vocal tics".

== Release ==
"Beat of My Drum" was released with the on air on sale method on 3 June 2011. Universal Music, the record company which owns Polydor, were releasing all singles under this format at the time of "Beat of My Drum"'s release. The reason for this was to try and reduce the level of illegal downloading of music, a system that Roberts was not used to. As part of promoting singles in Girls Aloud, she was used to releasing a song after approximately six weeks of promotion, which included radio interviews, televised performances and print work. As a result, Roberts stated that the new system was "very scary" as she was not used to releasing a song with comparatively little publicity, and worried about how her "Beat of My Drum" and subsequent singles would chart.

== Critical reception ==
"Beat of My Drum" was acclaimed by music critics. Robert Copsey for Digital Spy gave the song five out of five stars, saying that "Once named the least desirable member of Girls Aloud, the transformation of Nicola Roberts from pasty and awkward backing singer into glowing, haute couture pop songstress has been a magnificent spectacle." Jeff Benjamin of Billboard called Roberts' effort the most "intriguing" out of all the Girls Aloud solo efforts. He said that Roberts had potential for success in the United States, comparing the song to the work of such artists as M.I.A., Robyn and Kelis. He asked readers to imagine that "a young M.I.A. – mixed with Robyn and band Yelle – went on a shopping spree to Urban Outfitters, started chanting 'L! O! V! E!' and turned it all into a true summer anthem." A writer from Popjustice noted that "Beat of My Drum" "hardly happened by accident" but that "it feels really carefree and spontaneous", explaining "what we mean by that is that you can tell a lot of care and attention has gone into it".

Dean Piper for the Daily Mirror called the song "fantastic" claiming that Roberts "means business with her debut solo material", and saying he could not "get enough of the single", calling it "classic pop, fresh and fantastic." Michael Cragg for The Guardian compared the chanting chorus to that of Justice vs. Simian's track, "We Are Your Friends". He called it both "ridiculously cool and a bit naff". In response to the general acclaim from critics, Roberts wished that the track would be well received amongst her peers, saying "I haven't seen one bad review from the single or album samplers – it seems too good to be true. The response from critics has been amazing. It's like being at school and being told 'well done' by the teachers but I want my classmates to like it too. I want the people at home to get something from the record. Then I'll be doubly happy."

After the leak of the Madonna track "Give Me All Your Luvin'" in November 2011, critics such as David Kreps of Yahoo! and fans alike noted similarities to the track and Roberts' "Beat of My Drum" The comparisons arose after the "cheerleader-style" chorus is heard on the Madonna track as she chants the lyrics "L-U-V Madonna" whilst Roberts track features the lyrics "L-O-V-E/ Dance to the beat of my drum/ Dance to the beat of my drum." A writer for the Daily Mirror commented on the comparison calling "Give Me All Your Luvin'" "a poor variation on Nicola Roberts' 'Beat of My Drum'" and negatively commenting on the misspelling of "love", which Madonna stylised as "l-u-v".

=== Accolades ===
At the end of 2011, "Beat of My Drum" was voted number 25 on MTV's 25 Best Songs of 2011. James Montgomery wrote that the song was a "supremely saccharine single from erstwhile Girls Aloud member mashes together every notable pop moment in recent history, yet somehow manages to be better that the sum of its parts. That's thanks mostly to the supercharged, sing-a-long chorus, where the whole thing comes together in a head-spinning rush. She should go solo more often." The song was also listed on Billboard magazine's Best Songs of 2011 list at number 14. "Beat of My Drum" was listed as The Guardian's 14th best song.

== Music video ==
=== Background and development ===
The music video for "Beat of My Drum" was filmed in Los Angeles and directed by Wendy Morgan, who Roberts described as "focused and passionate". The singer continued to say that because of this, she felt comfortable with her immediately. The music video and production was featured on the Through Nicola's Eyes webisodes, in which Roberts stated that she found the production of the music video very stressful. Talking about the experience in an interview with MTV News, Roberts stated that "I'm nervous and I'm dreading the night before... I know I'm going to be like losing half a stone in weight overnight, so I'm going to have to get myself into the zone." Roberts attributed her stress on the set of the video to her time with Girls Aloud, as she had always recorded music videos with four other members; this was the first time she had performed on her own. This meant that critical responses would only be aimed only at her. During the video shoot, Roberts further discussed the anxiety of a solo career claiming pressure from Morgan was making her feel uncomfortable. During the production, Roberts feared that feeling uncomfortable whilst shooting could have an overall negative effect on the video, explaining "You've got to be strong and be professional and get through it, obviously enjoy it, but if you feel uncomfortable, you can't look uncomfortable otherwise it's not going to work". The video has gained over 5 million views on YouTube.

=== Synopsis and reception ===
Roberts in the video for "Beat of My Drum", wearing a 1970s inspired outfit. She performs with three female dancers throughout the video.

The video opens with two men street dancing in a white hall, with speakers and chairs scattered around. Shots of an audience lead to Roberts walking to a microphone positioned on a stage before she starts lip-synching, wearing a 1970s style outfit. After knocking over the microphone stand, Roberts performs a routine with three female back-up dancers in front of multiple speakers. During the chorus, she dances with the same three dancers, whilst shots of men watching them are shown. Roberts then leads the three women through the hall before they perform a dance section in the bridge of the track. Three men marching in a small white room are shown, leading to a shot of Roberts marching alongside a marching band of drummers. She is then shown in a multi-coloured sweater-dress, stood atop a speaker and surrounded by dancers. Final shots show Roberts producing shapes of letters L, O, V, and E with cheerleaders. The video ends with Roberts casually interacting with her dancers.

A writer from MTV Buzzworthy stated they were "sold" on the concept;

== Live performances ==
Roberts performed "Beat of My Drum" for the first time at the 2011 T4 on the Beach in the United Kingdom. After her performance, the singer was asked how she felt it went, saying she had "forgotten what a crowd like that feels and looks like. I try not to get nervous – I don't like to think about things too much beforehand, otherwise I worry too much. I like to deal with the situation when it happens." A beatboxer from Norfolk, Tom Povey, was picked to perform with her on stage after he was seen performing in a London pub. Povey, who performs with the stage name Intensi T, said it was the highlight of his career. Roberts also performed the song on British chat-shows Daybreak and Paul O'Grady Live.

== Formats and track-listings ==
- Digital download
1. "Beat of My Drum" – 2:55
2. "Beat of My Drum" (Instrumental) – 2:56
3. "Porcelain Heart" (iTunes pre-order bonus track) – 3:48
- Remixes EP
1. "Beat of My Drum" (Loverush UK! Club Mix) – 6:25
2. "Beat of My Drum" (KC Blitz Remix) – 3:10
3. "Beat of My Drum" (Pictureplanes Sage Burn Remix) – 4:27
4. "Beat of My Drum" (Loverush UK! Radio Edit) – 3:38
- CD single
1. "Beat of My Drum" – 2:58
2. "Beat of My Drum" (Loverush UK! Radio Edit) – 3:38
3. "Disco Blisters and a Comedown" (Roberts, von Doll, Tikovoi) – 3:03

== Chart performance ==
In the United Kingdom, "Beat of My Drum" debuted at number 27 on the UK Singles Chart, on 18 June 2011. The following week, the single fell outside of the top 40 to number 64, and fell to number 88 in its third week. However, the song rose to number 76 in its fourth week, and again to number 50 in its fifth. In Ireland, the song debuted and peaked at number 37 on the Irish Singles Chart on 9 June 2011, whilst in Scotland the song debuted at number 26 on the issue date of 18 June 2011.

=== Charts ===
Chart (2011)	Peak position
Ireland (IRMA)	37
Scotland (Official Charts Company)	26
UK Singles (Official Charts Company)	27

== Release history ==
Country	Date	Format	Label
Brazil	2 June 2011	Digital download	Polydor Records
Ireland	3 June 2011	Digital download	Polydor Records
United Kingdom	5 June 2011	Digital download	Polydor Records
United Kingdom	11 July 2011	CD single	Polydor Records

== In popular culture ==
The song is featured in the soundtrack of Horrid Henry: The Movie, released in 2011.
