= Cinderella's Eyes =

Studio album by Nicola Roberts
- Released: 23 September 2011
- Recorded: July 2010 – May 2011
- Genre: Electropop; dance-pop; indie pop
- Length: 43:42
- Label: Polydor
- Producer: Dimitri Tikovoi; Diplo; Metronomy; Traxstarz; The Invisible Men

Singles from Cinderella's Eyes
- 1. "Beat of My Drum" Released: 3 June 2011; 2. "Lucky Day" Released: 16 September 2011; 3. "Yo-Yo" Released: 8 January 2012

Cinderella's Eyes is the only studio album by English singer and songwriter Nicola Roberts. It was released on 23 September 2011 by Polydor Records. As a member of the British girl group Girls Aloud, Roberts drew inspiration from her time with the group. Her experience with Girls Aloud's formation found her being labelled "ugly" by the media, and the constant negative attention and subsequent personal problems resulted in her struggling with her confidence. She started recording for the album in 2010 and co-wrote all of the original tracks on the album, working closely with producers Dimitri Tikovoï, Maya von Doll (from electro group Sohodolls) and Diplo on the album, as well as Canadian electropop band Dragonette. The concept of the album derived from fairy tales, focusing mostly upon "Cinderella" after titling the album Cinderella's Eyes. The album artwork features Roberts next to a collection of vintage artefacts wearing a modern interpretation of the Cinderella glass slipper, co-produced by shoe designer Atalanta Weller.

The album was characterised by quirky electropop production; thematically the album deals with Roberts' insecurities and self-doubt, with subtle social commentary about the British media and culture incorporated in the lyrics. The album opens with "Beat of My Drum", an electropop dance track which features chants, something that is presented throughout the album. Her use of rap is included on tracks such as "I", "Take a Bite" and "Sticks and Stones". The album was inspired by Robyn and Kate Bush, both of whom have received comparisons to songs within the album.

Cinderella's Eyes was received well by music critics, who praised the production on the album, Roberts's voice, and her lyrics. The album was also praised for being the most original solo album from any of the members of Girls Aloud. Although the album did not reach commercial success, many critics commented that the album was underrated and deserved more appreciation. "Beat of My Drum" was released as the album's first track. The track received positive reviews and performed well commercially, charting at number 27 in the United Kingdom. A music video directed by Wendy Morgan showed Roberts performing in 1970s-inspired outfits. The second single, "Lucky Day", was released a week before the album and featured production from the band Dragonette. It was also well-received, and the music video, directed by Stephen Agnes, featured Roberts in the East Village of New York City performing in a floral dress. A deluxe edition of the album featuring ten new songs, Behind Cinderella's Eyes, was announced on 26 October 2021.

== Background and inspiration ==
"I think I have a lot of music inside of me, so I want to push myself with writing. I don't really get much time to practice and I know this makes perfect, which frustrates me. [...] I know that I have a lot more to give in writing and singing than I've already given, and I know that when I get this out of my system I will be happy because it's not just something i enjoy – it's the making of me. The way I feel about it has increased as I've got older, as I've grown into what I like and what I actually love doing. I definitely want to develop this more."

— Roberts discussing her ambition to write solo music material.

Nicola Roberts is one fifth of the band Girls Aloud. During her time with the girl group, she struggled with loneliness, due to living away from home in London, busy schedule, and media criticism of her image, eventually describing her time in the band as a "blur". She became exhausted and found herself with two personalities, one being a "normal" girl and another to deal with the celebrity lifestyle, with which she was uncomfortable. Roberts claimed that the hardest aspect of being with the group was the media attention – which would constantly pick out flaws with her image. She said she "just had to harden myself to it, actually, inside, I was dying". The album was inspired by her time performing with Girls Aloud – "It would have been stupid for me to make an album that meant nothing." For Roberts, the album was about making a risky record, where there wasn't a guaranteed commercial success, explaining to The Guardian: "It's taken every last bit of confidence just to release this record, or maybe I've just brainwashed myself into feeling more confident. I don't know if it's good, or if I've just told myself it's good." On 6 May 2011 via her official website, Roberts confirmed that she had been developing a studio album ready for release, she said;

I'm writing this and I feel so excited and nervous all at the same time. Everytime I think about what I'm about to do I get the biggest butterflies [...] For over a year, I've been in the studio writing my own songs and working towards making my own record. The time has come where I have to come out of my safe bubble that is the studio and share my music with you... butterflies just got worse [...] I've had the incredible opportunity to work with some of my favourite artists, DJs and producers on my album. I have had the most amazing time and I have learnt so much. It was important that my record was personal to me. I wanted to be able to look back on the album and know that I have honestly put 100% of myself into it. I've written songs and stories that I have wanted to write for a long time. I really hope that you're able to relate to my music, because that really is what it's all about.. So here goes, I'm taking a big leap, but it's going to be the best fun ever.

=== Artwork ===
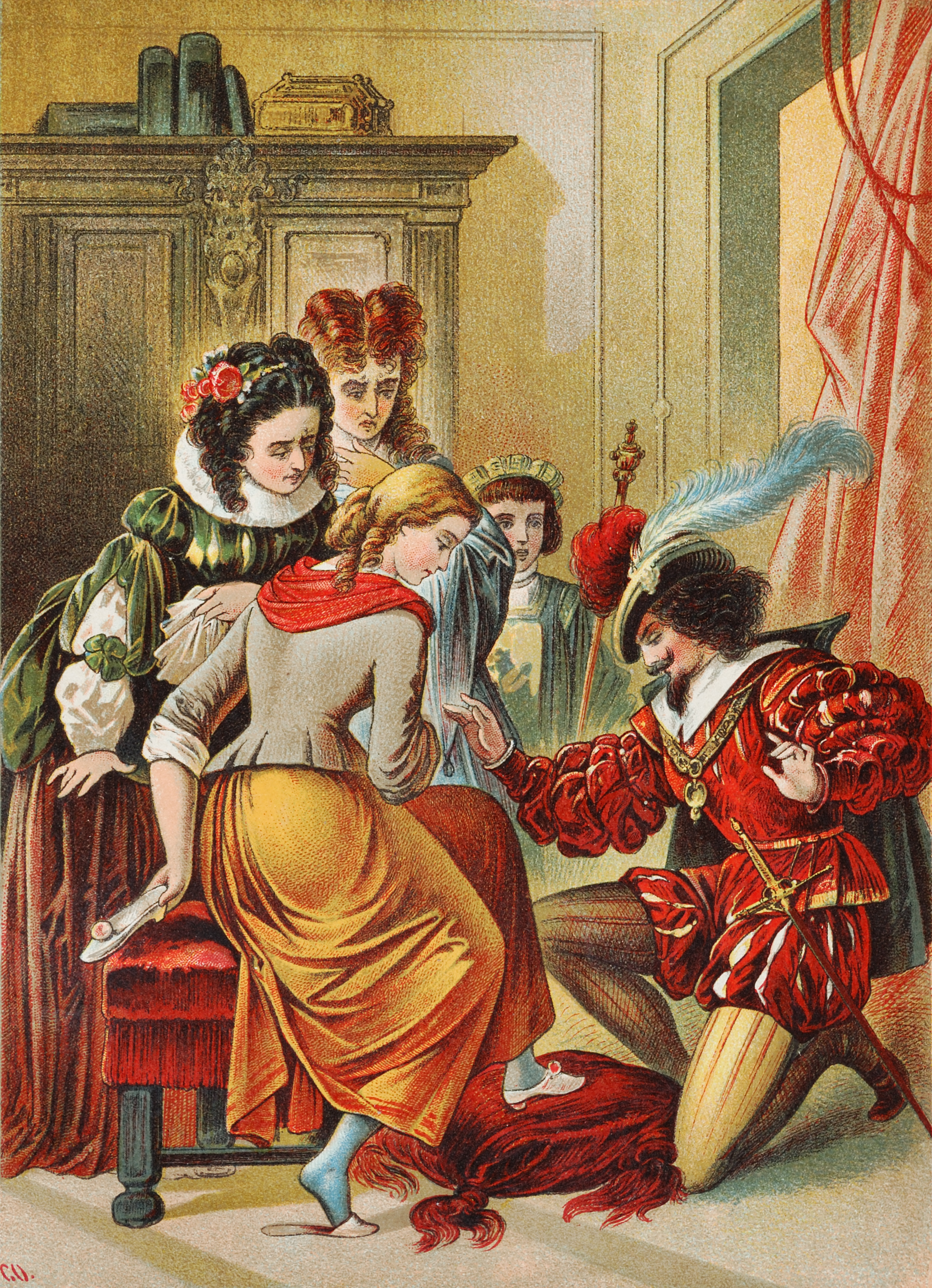
The album concept and artwork was based upon the fairy-tale character Cinderella.

The album artwork premiered on 22 August 2011, and features Roberts next to a collection of vintage artefacts wearing a modern interpretation of Cinderella's glass slippers. The album artwork was shot at Master Shipwright's House in London, which Roberts described as "run-down reality with a hint of fairytale". The concept of the artwork was to relate to the different sounds of the album, which Roberts described as "red" and "blue" tracks, claiming she wanted "to be on parallel with the art and clothes". The emerging detailing in electro music, as Roberts described it was something she wanted present in the artwork, whilst talking to Rolling Stone she said "I wanted that rhythm to be present in the imagery, the way I pictured it. There's a lot going on with the sounds on this record; it was important to me that the visual side was equally eclectic, so that it came full circle. This is a full package. For the album photograph shoot, Roberts worked alongside shoe designer Atalanta Weller to produce the shoes for the album. The "21st century" Cinderella style glass slippers were produced for the album campaign, Roberts explained about the shoes and fashion in relation to the record saying; "that will play a big part in the campaign for the record [...] the crystals represent a massive part in the theme of the album". The shoe, a wedge, is in Weller's signature style and, whilst talking to Vogue, Weller called her intrigue at working with Roberts due to them being an unlikely pairing. Weller called Roberts' style "incredible" and "extremely distinctive, luxurious and original":

A collaboration is like a good conversation, Nicola came to my studio a couple of times and I went to hers; we initially chatted about her music, the forthcoming album and how this related to her vision for the shoes. I went away and started designing my response to this. After our first meeting I was excited by her ideas and collaborating with people who have a strong vision is really fantastic. Nicola considers everything she does really carefully and has a totally clear view of what she wants to achieve. While the shoes are just a small part of this, I knew it would be interesting and fun to work together.

== Development ==
"I want to get back into the studio, maybe work with an up-and-coming artist, too. I would to spend six months in the studio learning as much as I can about writing and producing, working with some really cool people and just learning solidly and having fun. I want to develop vocally and musically so that I know what kind of music I want to sing. I have so much music inside of me that I haven't been able to get out. To me, music and writing is like my diary."

— Roberts discussing what how she wanted to develop her debut album.

Roberts co-wrote every song on the album, with the exception of the Korgis song "Everybody's Got to Learn Sometime" which she covered for the record. The songwriting partnership was important to Roberts, who said "I had to feel like I would say and mean every single one of these lyrics" and explained that she wouldn't want to release something that wasn't her own as she had been given an opportunity where she "put every last bit of heart and soul into it". In an interview with Rolling Stone, Roberts was questioned on her concept for the record, where she stated that she wished to avoid a record produced under guidelines of regular pop music. She found that producing an "electro" record helped her produce an innovative record, she found that after working with the Girls Aloud producer Xenomania that she was used to "breaking pop rules" something which she continued with during the production of Cinderella's Eyes. Vocally she also wanted to produce something that could come as a surprise to those who hadn't heard her "full range before". The title of the album derives from a track of the same name from the album. The song "Cinderella's Eyes" was written in the early stages of the album recording, with lyrics telling a story similar to several fairy tale characters. Roberts described "Cinderella's Eyes" as "a song on my album that I wrote about a year ago… It's about a girl called Sleeping Beauty who wakes up and wonders what life has instore [sic] for her… 'Will she meet any baddies or goodies and will she lay with any Princes or Hoodies'… She asks Cinderella 'Are you happy with your fella and your nice home', and tells girls 'They have to do it for themselves as cards are so randomly dealt.' I think it represents my views on happy endings."

Whilst discussing the record with Rolling Stone she discussed her selection of producers for the record, with a goal to create "a unique record" becoming the basis of her selection. After being asked whether there was anyone she wished to work with on the record, Roberts declared that she wanted Kate Bush. However, contacting Bush was difficult; after asking and hinting to her record label during the year she was producing the album, she found that nobody could establish communications. Electropop band Dragonette worked on the album, producing the second single from the album, "Lucky Day". The band were among the first to work on the record. Roberts co-wrote the lyrics, saying: "When I wrote 'Lucky Day' I had short hair and was really into '40s fashion. All of the 'woah woah woah woah' and the 'ah ha' really is a reflection of that." She also stated when it came to the production of the track, early in 2011, that she wanted to produce a "more downbeat dance record" noting it was what she was into at that point". Roberts worked with producer Diplo, who co-produced the track "Beat of My Drum", she explained whilst talking to The Guardian, "I had to ring him [Diplo] and… you know when you ring a boy for the first time? I knew I only had one chance, so I just fired at him. 'I want this, I want that, don't send it back like that. I'm going to send you the session again just so you've got it.' He reassured me a bit, and I put the phone down, thinking, it's not in my hands now". When Roberts received the track back from Diplo, she was too nervous to listen to it, as it meant so much to her. Whilst back in her hometown of Liverpool she put her younger brother and sister in the car with her, and after burning the track to a CD, drove to a deserted field and played it loudly. After positive responses from the pair, Roberts declared "I'm so proud of it. I can't believe it's mine. The man is a genius". Roberts worked with producer Joseph Mount on the album, recording two songs. For years before the pair started work together, Mount had mentioned several times that he wished to work with Girls Aloud, and had sent "short beats" to her, including music which he thought the record label would approve of, as well as a wild-card style compilation. When the two started work in the studio, both of the tracks produced by Mount were chosen from the wild-card category, with lyrics written by Roberts, and the melodies in the tracks produced jointly.

== Composition ==
"It's electronically lead [sic], and if you're a fan of electronic music then hopefully there's something for you on there. 'Sticks and Stones' is a ballad but not a slushy one, and hopefully people will be able to relate to the lyrics. There's the Dragonette track which has a dancey, Robyn-esque production, and then there's the hard and dramatic Metronomy sounds on the song 'I'. My favourite changes all the time, but at the moment it's a song called 'Take a Bite', which is really cheeky, upbeat and rough around the edges."

— Roberts discussing the concept and the content of the album.

The album opens with the track "Beat of My Drum" and the track has been compared to artists M.I.A., Daphne and Celeste and the Ting Tings, featuring a "breakdown section" where Roberts raps as well as singing traditional vocals. The second track, "Lucky Day", is a dance-pop song and has gathered comparisons to artists Katy Perry and David Guetta. The 1960s style track lyrically talks about falling in love, with Roberts explaining "The song is about a boy not playing along but in the end you win him over and it's your lucky day. You can take it however you want though, maybe you won on the scratch cards and so you had a lucky day, that kind of thing". Roberts' voice has been described as a "springy" vibrato, with breathy background vocals featuring sounds effect including repeated kissing noises. The next track, "Yo-Yo", has been compared to the sound of Kate Bush and described as "wistful", featuring the lyrics "I'm the kind of girl who likes to dream a lot". It opens with an 808 kick drum, and the track "thumps to a dramatic, 50's girlpop pastiche". The "unhinged" choruses featuring explicit words, lyrics such as "Don't want to be the last to know-oh oh oh", and during the middle-eight of the track the 1950s theme "completely goes out the window" for a classic club mix featuring a drum machine. "Cinderella's Eyes", the fourth track, has been compared to past tracks by Girls Aloud, with a "slomo disco" style where Roberts performs falsetto, suggesting a Kate Bush influence. "Porcelain Heart" is the fifth track, featuring an "eerie twinkle of descending notes". The track has been described as "Italo-disco" with a "single-minded pulse", with Roberts shouting the word "heart" before the track breaks into a synth section.

The sixth track, "I", has been described as a "moody-electro" and a "dark pop" track. It opens with an Eastern-style introduction which merges into a "romantic synth" part, with Roberts singing "I’m scared to wake up one day and find out that my bubble's burst" and hoping that "everyone loves" her new direction, as well as mentioning her dislike for "people that leave comments on the internet". The next track is a cover of the Korgis' "Everybody's Got to Learn Sometime". Roberts explained the inclusion of the track on the album saying "The lyrics mean a lot to me. I identified with the song in general. It might not be powerful to everybody, but it's powerful to me. I wanted to do it, I love the song." The cover precedes the song "Say It Out Loud", which has gathered comparisons to Katy Perry, and is a high-energy pop song featuring "Crystal Castles-ish 8-bit bleeps here and there" and a chorus with a "big old fuzzy hollering rush". "Gladiator", the ninth track, has been described as a Berlin-style dance track. The disco track hears Roberts perform "girly" vocals, with comparisons to Teena Marie and Heartbreak, whilst the following song "Fish Out of Water" garnerered comparisons to Metronomy. Track eleven, "Take a Bite" has been compared to singer Robyn; and features a rap from Roberts including "Called me a rude ginger bitch, they're gonna eat all their words" – referencing a 2003 feud with a member of pop group Busted. The final track "Sticks and Stones" describes a time when she would beg her driver to buy her vodka despite being underage, in relation to the subject matter Roberts explained "How funny that I was too young for so many things, yet you thought I'd cope with being told I'm ugly, Over and over". Roberts explained the concept of the track, noting "What it is with 'Sticks and Stones' is I wanted all the people out there who hurt like that to know that they're not the only ones in that position. Sometimes there's so many people in the world suffering from the same thing or hurting from the same thing, but they feel like they’re on their own. I wanted a song that could highlight the subject so it was like, actually I’m so not on my own here." Lyricism on the album, was based around rap, and rhyme with Roberts stating they were based on personal events, she said:

The lyrics are quite personal. I like rap music, and rappers use real-life language and don’t hold back in what they talk about. My lyrics aren’t generic pop lyrics just there because they rhyme. I’ve tried to write things as I’d say them, so it sounds more like me. There’s a song called "Sticks And Stones", which is about when I was 17 and I thought I’d won the jackpot when I got in the band [Girls Aloud], and then things not turning out as I might have expected. The middle eight on that song is very honest and truthful.

== Critical reception ==
Professional ratings
Review scores
Source	Rating
Allmusic	3.5/5 stars
BBC Music	(positive)
Drowned in Sound	(7/10)
Evening Standard	positive
Express.co.uk	3/5 stars
Financial Times	4/5 stars
The Guardian	4/5 stars
NME	(7/10)
The Telegraph	4/5 stars
Virgin Media	4/5 stars

I've been looking at my album reviews today and, honestly, I could cry. It's a bit of a shocker. Someone tweeted me all of the mark-ups – the stars that the various papers had given it – and when you see them all collected like that, 4 out of 5 and 5 out of 5, it was just like: 'Oh my fucking god! That's incredible.' I could cry. It’s quite amazing. And now the album's out there and I just have to hope that people like it. That's all I can ask for.

—Roberts discussing the acclaimed reviews for the album.

The album received praise from music critics upon its release. Ludovic Hunter-Tilney of the Financial Times found that Roberts had pushed her "mainstream pop background to the limit". He explained that whilst many expected the worst from another Girls Aloud band member, he noted "You expect the worst – well, not worse than Cole's terrible albums, but not good – only to discover that Cinderella's Eyes is actually very promising". Robert Copsey from Digital Spy found that without listening to the album the impact would be limited as she had a "troubled start" and "limited solo spots" with band Girls Aloud but after listening to the record he expressed that her transition to a "trendy solo songstress is one discussed with admirable honesty throughout her debut offering". James Lachno of The Daily Telegraph gave the album four stars out of five and stated "Nicola Roberts has made an assured solo debut that suggests she may outlast her flashier bandmates as a pop star of substance", he positively commented on her use of a "autobiographical lyrics" and compared the album to those of Robyn. Hermione Hoby of The Guardian gave the album four stars out of five, calling "Beat of My Drum", "infectiously bratty" and positively responded to the track "Porcelain Heart" saying, "her Florence-bothering bellow of 'heaaaaaart' on the fearsome 'Porcelain Heart', Roberts sounds utterly self-assured." Rick Pearson of the Evening Standard felt that her Cinderella-persona for the album concept was appropriate to her life story calling the record "a glittering pop song furnished with yelping Kate Bush-isms – while Metronomy's Joseph Mount drops by to produce the haunting highlight 'Fish out of Water'. Fun and fearless: Roberts can go to the ball".

Emily Mackay of NME generally responded well to the album's tracks, Mackay concluded her review of the album, stating "Well, it's admirably honest, if trying a little to hard to be weird, and its LOOK I'M WELL QUIRKY charms might well grow on us with repeated listens. Unlike the work of her fellow Girls, there's some actual depth and wit here." Hugh Montgomery of The Independent described Roberts as "the most interesting Girl Aloud" whilst calling the album "one of the finest pop albums of the year". Montgomery described the album as "conspicuously characterful", "self-revealing" and called the record "a fairy tale indeed". Matthew Horton of Virgin Media found Nicola Roberts solo effort to be the most successful of the Girls Aloud band members, saying "While the obvious voices, Nadine and Cheryl, have had a go, it's shy sullen Nicola who's made a satisfying record from start to finish", Horton labelled "I" a "avant-pop" song, and called "Beat of My Drum" "ear-catching", whilst writing about the album "somehow everything works". Despite giving the album seven out of ten, Krystina Nellis of Drowned in Sound gave a mixed to positive review, Nellis listed both "Say It Out Loud" and "Everybody's Got to Learn Sometime" as the two weakest on the album but praised tracks like "I" as well as producer Metronomy, overall Nellis declared "Cinderella's Eyes isn't exactly a sociology PhD thesis on the Plight of Woman. But it's born out of the knowing air of experience, particularly of life's shittier moments, that all the best pop artists should have and too many lack."

== Release and promotion ==
The lead single was released with the "on air on sale" method. Roberts stated that Universal Records wanted this as it was the way they were releasing all of their new work. The record label was attempting to avoid illegal downloads as much as possible, with Roberts stating that "it's now harder for artists" this way. Talking of Girls Aloud, Roberts stated she was used to releasing a song after around six weeks of promotion, including radio, television and press promotion, and commented that it was "very scary" to release a song without this publicity. She also noted the effect of this kind of release against chart positions, she said, "I think it's harder for the public now because it's always been about the chart position. I also think it takes the excitement out of the charts because it's not a competition anymore." The album artwork and track-listing were confirmed on 22 August 2011 on Roberts official website, with a confirmation that fans who pre-ordered the album on Play.com would receive a signed poster, and those who pre-ordered the song from digital store iTunes would have an exclusive highlight video montage of her webisode series Through Nicola's Eyes. A deluxe edition of the album featuring ten new songs, Behind Cinderella's Eyes, was announced on 26 October 2021.

=== Singles ===
"Beat of My Drum" was the first single released from the album, and was produced by French producer Dimitri Tikovoï with additional production by Diplo and was released on 5 June 2011 in the United Kingdom. The track has been compared to those of artists M.I.A. and Daphne and Celeste. Produced by Major Lazer, it features Roberts performing both singing and rap vocals. The track received acclaim from critics, but commercially it performed weakly, peaking at number 27 in the United Kingdom. A music video, directed by Wendy Morgan, was recorded in Los Angeles. The second single, "Lucky Day", was released on 16 September 2011 and was produced by Canadian electropop band Dragonette. Inspired by the 1940s era, Roberts wanted to produce a "more downbeat dance record". The dance-pop track lyrically talks of a relationship where the man is not succumbing to Roberts advances, but "winning" him over in the end of the song; however, she stated the lyrics could be interpreted into any lucky situation. It garnered generally positive reviews from critics, who responded positively to the pop elements and the production by Dragonette. A music video, directed by Stephen Agnes, was released and was recorded in the East Village of New York City, featuring Roberts performing in a floral dress. "Yo-Yo" was released as the third single from the album on 6 January 2012. The song garnered generally positive reviews being labelled "radio friendly".

== Track listing ==
Cinderella's Eyes
No.	Title	Writer(s)	Producer(s)	Length
1.	"Beat of My Drum"	Nicola Roberts; Wesley Pentz; Dimitri Tikovoi; Maya von Doll	Tikovoi; Diplo*; Derek Allen*	2:58
2.	"Lucky Day"	Roberts; Martina Sorbara; Daniel Groome Kurtz	Traxstarz	3:20
3.	"Yo-Yo"	Roberts; Tikovoi; von Doll	Tikovoi	3:25
4.	"Cinderella's Eyes"	Roberts; Tikovoi; von Doll	Tikovoi	3:30
5.	"Porcelain Heart"	Roberts; Dave McCraken; Tikovoi; von Doll	Tikovoi	3:49
6.	"I"	Roberts; Joseph Mount	Metronomy	3:39
7.	"Everybody's Got to Learn Sometime"	James Warren	Tikovoi	3:38
8.	"Say It Out Loud"	Roberts; George Astasio; Jason Pebworth; Jon Shave; Dan Thomas; Matthew Fry; Ritchard Lavis-Williams; Dean Gorno	The Invisible Men	4:35
9.	"Gladiator"	Roberts; Tikovoi; von Doll	Tikovoi	2:59
10.	"Fish out of Water"	Roberts; Mount	Metronomy	4:38
11.	"Take a Bite"	Roberts; Astasio; Pebworth; Shave; Jon Mills; Kurtis McKenzie	The Invisible Men; The Arcade	3:16
12.	"Sticks and Stones"	Roberts; Tikovoi; von Doll	Tikovoi	3:55

Bonus digital content
No.	Title	Length
13.	"Through Nicola's Eyes" (video)
14.	"Beat of My Drum" (music video)
15.	"Lucky Day" (music video)

Spotify bonus tracks
No.	Title	Writer(s)	Producer(s)	Length
13.	"Lucky Day" (Engine Room Sessions)	Roberts; Sorbara; Kurtz	Traxstarz	3:21
14.	"Yo-Yo" (Engine Room Sessions)	Roberts; Tikovoi; von Doll	Tikovoi	3:32
15.	"I" (Engine Room Sessions)	Roberts; Mount	Metronomy	3:43
16.	"Sticks and Stones" (Engine Room Sessions)	Roberts; Tikovoi; von Doll	Tikovoi	4:15

Behind Cinderella's Eyes
No.	Title	Writer(s)	Producer(s)	Length
1.	"Crash"	Roberts; Richard X; Hannah Robinson	Richard X	3:37
2.	"Head"	Roberts; Børge Fjordheim; Richard X; Robinson	Richard X	3:10
3.	"Heart Racing"	Roberts; Sorbara; Kurtz	Dan Kurtz	3:07
4.	"Lucky Day" (Dan Grech mix)	Roberts; Sorbara; Kurtz	Kurtz; Dan Grech-Marguerat*	2:37
5.	"Memory of You"	Roberts; Cheryl Cole; Miranda Cooper; Nadine Coyle; Sarah Harding; Brian Higgins; Tim Powell; Giselle Sommerville; Kimberley Walsh	Higgins; Xenomania	3:48
6.	"Pipe Dreams"	Roberts; Richard Stannard; James Ford	Ford; Stannard	4:00
7.	"So Damn Right"	Roberts; Sorbara; Kurtz	Kurtz	3:11
8.	"Tomorrow"	Roberts; Stannard	Stannard	3:58
9.	"Disco, Blisters & a Comedown"	Roberts; Tikovoi; von Doll	Tikovoi; Allen	3:04
10.	"Fix Me"	Roberts; Tikovoi; von Doll	Tikovoi	3:07

* additional production.

== Charts ==
Chart (2011)	Peak position
Irish Albums (IRMA)	48
Scottish Albums (OCC)	21
UK Albums (OCC)	17

== Release history ==
Release dates and formats for Cinderella's Eyes
Region	Date	Format	Edition	Label	Ref.
Ireland	23 September 2011	Digital download; CD	Standard	Polydor Records	
Brazil	23 September 2011	Digital download	Standard	Polydor Records	
United Kingdom	23 September 2011	Digital download; CD	Standard	Polydor Records	
Worldwide	29 May 2020	Digital download, streaming	Standard	Polydor Records	
Various	28 January 2022	CD	Behind Cinderella's Eyes	Plastic Pop Records	
Various	28 January 2022	Cassette	Standard	Plastic Pop Records	
Various	1 July 2022	LP	Behind Cinderella's Eyes	Plastic Pop Records	
Various	1 July 2022	LP	Standard	Plastic Pop Records	
