= Sticks and Stones (Nicola Roberts song) =

Song by Nicola Roberts

Song by Nicola Roberts

from the album Cinderella's Eyes
- Genre: Pop
- Length: 3:55
- Label: Polydor
- Songwriters: Nicola Roberts; Dimitri Tikovoi; Maya von Doll
- Producer: Tikovoi

"Sticks and Stones" (stylised as "sticks + stones") is a song recorded by English singer Nicola Roberts, for her debut studio album, Cinderella's Eyes (2011). Roberts co-wrote the song with Maya von Doll and its producer Dimitri Tikovoi. "Sticks and Stones" lyrically discusses her negative experiences as part of the girl group Girls Aloud, including that of her underage alcohol consumption and "faceless" bullying from the media and other celebrities. The song found success with anti-bullying organisations and garnered positive reviews from music critics, with many complementing the honesty of its lyrics.

A lyric video was posted on Roberts' official Twitter account and YouTube channel. She performed an acoustic version of the track, which was then also uploaded to her official YouTube channel. Roberts appeared on British morning show BBC Breakfast to discuss her activism and the lyricism of the track, which led her to do the same on BBC News and discuss the same issues with Rolling Stone. Continuing her activism, she talked to the education secretary Michael Gove to help eradicate bullying.

== Writing and inspiration ==
After winning the reality television series Popstars: The Rivals to become one fifth of the girlband Girls Aloud, Roberts found herself subject to bullying. She endured years of taunting and being branded "the ugly one" of the group and she would often "cry herself to sleep", finding herself to be a victim of "faceless" bullying, advocated by celebrities such as Chris Moyles and Lily Allen. The abuse soon began to have an effect on Roberts mental stability, suffering from an "identity crisis". The taunts brought her close to a breakdown, with Roberts stating she was "miserable and confused" and soon after she found comfort in drinking alcohol. Originally, her ginger hair was something she "absolutely loved" as it was "just [her] thing" but, after joining the band, her appearance became an issue with the press – and Roberts recalled feeling that "the general perception" of her "is really not great at all." "People feel they can say nasty things and have anonymity behind the net – as they did with all the nasty comments about me – without fear of recrimination", Roberts said, and five years after the bullying, she found herself in a "better place", with critics complementing her image such as Clemmie Moodie from the Daily Mirror who said "the 25-year-old radiates confidence and, with a string of fashion successes has blossomed." "Sticks and Stones" was then written in response to these negative feelings, and Roberts found throughout the writing process she was cautioned by the serious subject matter, wishing to create a track featuring a "universal chorus" and to avoid self-indulgence.

== Development and music ==
"I wanted a song that could highlight the subject so it was like, actually I’m so not on my own here. And it wasn’t until I put it on YouTube and people left comments underneath that I realised what it meant to people, and it’s just unbelievable. It’s amazing that people who maybe wouldn’t say anything to a friend would post a paragraph on YouTube about the way they feel. I think it’s just so powerful."

— Roberts discussing the concept and reaction of the track.

After the writing process, Roberts described the production of "Sticks and Stones" a "nightmare". Ownership over the song was something she wanted "every single last little bit" of, so she could maintain her writing credits for the track and make something she is "proud of". Roberts' behaviours left her late for several recording sessions, stating that she'd "rather be late" than feel bad.

The song describes a time when Roberts was in severe depression, and discusses when she would "beg" her driver to buy her alcohol underage – with lyrics saying, "How funny that I was too young for so many things, yet you thought I'd cope with being told I'm ugly." Whilst writing for website Holy Moly, Roberts discussed the concept of "Sticks and Stones". She said, "What it is with Sticks and Stones is I wanted all the people out there who hurt like that to know that they’re not the only ones in that position. Sometimes there’s so many people in the world suffering from the same thing or hurting from the same thing, but they feel like they’re on their own. I wanted a song that could highlight the subject so it was like, actually I’m so not on my own here." Lyricism on the track, of which some was based around rap, hears Roberts performing about personal events. She said:

The lyrics are quite personal. I like rap music, and rappers use real-life language and don’t hold back in what they talk about. My lyrics aren’t generic pop lyrics just there because they rhyme. I’ve tried to write things as I’d say them, so it sounds more like me. There’s a song called Sticks And Stones, which is about when I was 17 and I thought I’d won the jackpot when I got in the band [Girls Aloud], and then things not turning out as I might have expected. The middle eight on that song is very honest and truthful.

== Advocacy ==
Roberts in the lyric video for "Sticks and Stones". A clip of the video was broadcast in an interview on BBC Breakfast, during which Roberts found it difficult to listen to the track in the company of others.

The release of Cinderella's Eyes sparked interest surrounding the track "Sticks and Stones", which saw Roberts appear on British television show BBC Breakfast, to discuss the lyricism of the track in relation to bullying. Shortly before the interview commenced, a portion of the lyric video was broadcast live which made Roberts "nervous", stating she does not "like listening to that song when other people are around". She found that the presenters of the interview were more interested that she had initially expected, which made the situation increasingly difficult. In addition to advocating bullying as a top issue on the show, Roberts gave an interview to BBC News, where presenters once again discussed the track and lyrical themes within. During the interview, Roberts said that social networking site Twitter is a tool that highlights the severity of bullying, calling it "out of control".

Roberts then gave an interview to Rolling Stone, in which she discussed "Sticks and Stones", her advocacy against bullying, and how she is "sick" of an image driven society. In the past, Roberts had pushed for a ban on under 18s using tanning beds, which followed through after backing from health secretary Andy Burnham. This initiated talks with Roberts and the British parliament. Roberts took a similar stance on bullying, saying it "doesn't need to happen", and that the British laws are failing to combat the issue. She noted, "People are still scared to go to school, kids are threatening to kill themselves; it's disgusting that it persists. So, again, I'm giving a voice to a cause, to hopefully affect change." Roberts then started communications with the education secretary, Michael Gove, to help raise awareness of the issue. On her official website, Roberts explained her progression to help eradicate bullying, saying:

"The internet has really highlighted this issue. It shows us how easy it is for people to pass judgement on others and it also shows us that people now have a place for expression. Whether it be twitter or blog posts it gives people a place to offload. Whenever I have bought somebody's record I always flick through and search for the ones that I really relate to at that time, they become my favourites, I play that song to death and then the rest of the album gets its chance. Music is there to milk an emotion I think. Whether it be a party track when you want to feel sky high or an emotional song when you need something to draw out how you feel inside. That's my sticks and stones and it's so comforting to know that it's yours too. I'm going to try my best to speak to Micheal Gove the educational secretary about how we can work out a better support system in schools for people finding themselves in unbearable situations every time they walk through the school gate… I'll keep you posted on that. Wish me luck!"

== Response ==
"I was crying when I was reading the comments. It didn’t help that the song was playing at the same time I was reading, so it was like double whammy. It makes me feel a little bit emotional as it is. But it really struck a chord. It’s so personal to me that I didn’t realise it could be the same for someone else and the comments made me realise that and it’s just amazing. People really resonate with it and that’s the whole reason why I write music. I want people to relate to it. That’s what I want when I listen to a record. I want a song to make me go: 'that’s how I feel right now'. I feel like I’ve managed to do that with Sticks and Stones, and I feel proud that I have that. It’s a song that has a purpose rather than just a generic concept."

— Roberts discussing her reaction to the positive reception the track received.

Lyricism of the track has been "applauded" by anti-bullying organisations, whom have claimed it has "won her a legion of new fans". Emily Mackay of NME gave a positive review saying "it’s hard to imagine what it must be like for a teenager to submit to that kind of sniping scrutiny" calling the track "beautiful" and concluding her review saying the "ballad goes some way of explaining it without over-egging the point." Krystina Nellis of Drowned in Sound called the track "cuttingly personal". In a review for Cinderella's Eyes James Lachno of The Daily Telegraph discussed "Sticks and Stones" lyricism noting "but it’s Roberts’s autobiographical lyrics – notably tackling body image – that consistently startle, recalling the aching sincerity of diminutive Swede Robyn." Matthew Horton of Virgin Media positively commented on the lyricism of both tracks; "Take a Bite" and "Sticks and Stones" from Cinderella's Eyes, Horton described "Sticks and Stones" as a "gorgeous ballad" and concluded his response saying, "This quiet one has found a platform and she’s not going to step down without a fight." Roberts stated she struggles to listen to the track in the company of others, and that her parents were deeply affected when they listened to it. The effect of "Sticks and Stones" on her family and friends was discussed by Roberts who said;

It’s been a bit of an eye-opener to my family and friends. We all just pretended it wasn’t happening, the whole situation made me feel embarrassed – the horrible comments. We never talked about it. But the song really struck her because I never spoke about it so how would they know? She sort of saw what I went through, the brave face I put on. In terms of the rest of the band, none of us spoke about the bullying; we pretended it wasn’t happening. They could see I was embarrassed by it and didn’t want to bring it up and make it worse, or make one of the girls uncomfortable and embarrassed.
