= Blow (Ghinzu album) =

Studio album by Ghinzu
- Released: February 2004 (BE); September 2004 (EU)
- Recorded: Caraïbes Studio, Brussels
- Genre: Alternative rock, progressive rock
- Length: 55:04
- Label: Dragoon, Bang!, Atmosphérique, V2
- Producer: Ghinzu and Christine Verschorren

Ghinzu chronology
Electronic Jacuzzi (2000)	Blow (2004)	Mirror Mirror (2009)

Blow is the second album by Belgian rock group Ghinzu released in 2004. It features the single, "Do You Read Me?", and the song "The Dragster Wave" which was used in the 2008 film Taken and is included in its original soundtrack.

The album was first released on Dragoon, the label owned by the band (and distributed by the indie label Bang!) in February 2004 in Benelux. It was released in France six months later via Atmosphérique/Universal and then in Germany, Switzerland and Sweden via V2. The album cover art for the European release is different from the Belgian version. The Belgian cover shows singer John Stargasm holding his own cut-off head while singing. This was judged too aggressive by their French label (the band was under license of the major Universal via Atmosphérique) especially at a time when American hostage in Iraq, Nick Berg, just had been beheaded. The international album cover shows a negative image of two horses.

Blow was particularly successful in the French-speaking parts of Europe, where the single "Do You Read Me?" became a hit. This allowed Ghinzu to play big summer festivals, like the Eurockéennes de Belfort on July 2, 2005, where the band did a noticed performance on the Main Stage. Blow sold about 100,000 copies worldwide.

== Track listing ==
All lyrics are written by John Stargasm, except where noted.

No.	Title	Lyrics	Music	Length
1.	"Blow"		Stargasm, Remy	8:54
2.	"Do You Read Me?"	John Stargasm, Sanderson Poe	Hasson	4:16
3.	"Jet Sex"		Hasson, Stargasm	3:04
4.	"Cockpit Inferno"		Stargasm, Hasson	3:48
5.	"'Til You Faint"		Hasson, Remy	3:26
6.	"The Dragster-Wave"	John Stargasm, Sanderson Poe	Stargasm, Hasson	6:10
7.	"Sweet Love"		Stargasm	3:57
8.	"High Voltage Queen (The Reign Of)"		Stargasm, Hasson	5:15
9.	"21st Century Crooners"		Stargasm, Remy	3:29
10.	"Mine"		Stargasm, Remy	5:15
11.	"Horse"		Stargasm	2:52
12.	"Sea-Side Friends"		Stargasm	4:32

== Personnel ==
- John Stargasm - Vocals, keyboards, piano, synthesizer, bass (track 10)
- Mika "Nagazaki" Hasson - Bass, guitar (tracks 2–4), synthesizer (track 10)
- Greg Remy - Lead guitar, backing vocals
- Fabrice George - Drums
- Kris Dane - Rhythm guitar, synthesizer, backing vocals
- Sanderson Poe - Double bass, backing vocals
