= Blessed Carlo Acutis Catholic and Church of England Academy =

Sponsor-led academy school in Runcorn, Cheshire, England

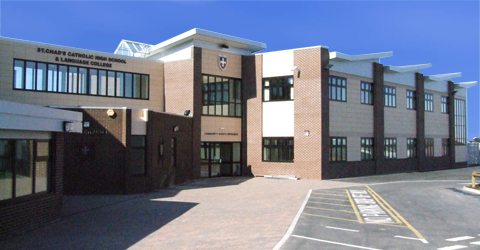

Location
- Grangeway; Runcorn, Cheshire, WA7 5YH; England; 53.3260°N 2.7115°W

Information
- Type: Academy
- Religious affiliation: Roman Catholic / Church of England
- Local authority: Halton Borough Council
- Trust: St Joseph Catholic Multi Academy Trust
- Department for Education URN: 149032 Tables
- Ofsted: Reports
- Headteacher: Alicia Freeman
- Gender: Coeducational
- Age: 11 to 16
- Enrolment: 372 as of March 2025
- Capacity: 950
- Website: blessedca.co.uk

Blessed Carlo Acutis Catholic and Church of England Academy, formerly St Chad's Catholic and Church of England Academy, is a coeducational secondary school in Runcorn, Cheshire, England.

St Chad's was founded as a Roman Catholic voluntary aided school in 1976. After Phase II of a new building programme costing £7.4 million began in the summer of 2008, the school reopened in 2009 as a joint-faith Roman Catholic and Church of England voluntary aided school administered by the Roman Catholic Diocese of Shrewsbury and the Church of England Diocese of Chester. An extension to the schools science block was constructed in 2013. Some areas of the school are available to hire for community sports facilities.

In February 2022, St Chad's Catholic and Church of England High School converted to academy status and was renamed St Chad's Catholic and Church of England Academy. The school is now sponsored by the St Joseph Catholic Multi Academy Trust, but continues to be under the jurisdiction of the Roman Catholic Diocese of Shrewsbury and the Church of England Diocese of Chester.

In October 2023, the school was renamed Blessed Carlo Acutis Catholic and Church of England Academy. Carlo Acutis (3 May 1991 – 12 October 2006) was an English-Italian website designer who documented Eucharistic miracles and approved Marian apparitions, and catalogued both on a website he designed before his death from leukaemia. He was noted for his cheerfulness, computer skills, and devotion to the Eucharist, which became a core theme of his life. He was beatified by Pope Francis on 10 October 2020.

== Overseas links ==
The school has links with Tongling No3 School in Anhui Province, China. The school also has links with St Mary's Boys Secondary School in Nyeri, Kenya, with regular trips being made between the two schools. It has hosted fundraising events to help support the Kenyan school, which gives young people who live in poverty a chance to get a better education.

== Notable pupils ==
- Nicola Roberts, member of Girls Aloud.
