= Girls Aloud: Ten Years at the Top =

- Genre: Documentary
- Starring: Girls Aloud
- Country of origin: United Kingdom
- Original language: English

Production
- Running time: 60 minutes

Original release
- Network: ITV
- Release: 15 December 2012

Girls Aloud: Ten Years at the Top is a documentary released to coincide with the tenth anniversary of British all-female pop group Girls Aloud. The documentary follows Girls Aloud from their formation on the ITV reality television programme Popstars: The Rivals to their reunion after a three-year hiatus.

== Summary ==
The documentary follows Girls Aloud's ten years as a band in three distinctive parts: The Definitive History, Solo Projects and Back Together Again. New interviews and previously unseen footage are featured. The documentary is narrated by Davina McCall, who hosted Popstars: The Rivals.

The first portion of the documentary begins with Girls Aloud's formation on the ITV reality television programme Popstars: The Rivals, airing the girls' first auditions and archived footage.

The second part of the documentary explores Girls Aloud's solo endeavours during the band's three-year hiatus. Cheryl Cole's successful solo career and recent headlining tour are highlighted, while Nadine Coyle's Los Angeles bar, Sarah Harding's film appearances, Nicola Roberts' "passion for fashion" and make-up range Dainty Doll, and Kimberley Walsh's stage career are "given a cursory nod." Nicola's solo career and the critical acclaim her debut album received was mentioned in the documentary. Nadine's solo album was also briefly mentioned.

The third section focuses on the band's tenth anniversary reunion, joining them as they prepare for their comeback. The documentary has a behind-the-scenes look at the video shoot for their single "Something New", the press conference announcing their return, and preparations for their first live performances in over three years.

== Broadcast and ratings ==
The documentary aired at 9pm on 15 December 2012 on ITV. It attracted 2.3 million viewers, a 10.5% share of the audience.

== Cast ==
=== Girls Aloud ===
- Cheryl Cole
- Nadine Coyle
- Sarah Harding
- Nicola Roberts
- Kimberley Walsh
