= Mirror Mirror (Ghinzu album) =

Studio album by Ghinzu
- Released: March 30, 2009 (FR, BEL, CH); July 30, 2010 (JAP, HK, AUS); August 20, 2010 (EU)
- Genre: Alternative rock, Progressive rock, Electronic
- Length: 46:52
- Label: PIAS
- Producer: Ghinzu, Christine Verschorren, Dimitri Tikovoi

Ghinzu chronology
Blow (2004)	Mirror Mirror (2009)	W.O.W.A. (2026)

Mirror Mirror is the third album by Belgian rock band Ghinzu. It has been released on March 30, 2009 in Belgium (via PIAS), France (via Universal) and Switzerland. The first single from the record was Cold Love for Belgium, while Take It Easy was chosen for France. Mirror Mirror was later released internationally, during the summer 2010. It received a CD release in Japan, Hong Kong, Australia and Continental Europe and a digital release elsewhere.

The record has a wider and more electronic sound than Blow. Some songs gathered together form a musical movement (for instance with Mother Allegra, Mirror Mirror, The Dream Maker or the three pieces ending the album). Mirror Mirror obtained immediate success in Belgium, reaching number 2 in the Walloon charts and in France where it reached the top 20. Though not as popular in Flanders, Ghinzu received some radio airplay for titles like Cold Love, Take it Easy and This War Is Silent, which allowed them to play major festival Rock Werchter in July 2009.

By the end of 2009, Ghinzu was voted best band of the year by the readers of Belgian newspaper Le Soir and Mirror Mirror had sold 47,000 copies in the territories it had already been released (which were at the time Benelux, France and Switzerland).

On December 6, 2010, an EP of remixes of Mirror Mirror titles was digitally released as The Mirror Mirror Remix EP. It includes five remixes by producers and DJ's such as Jagz Kooner, 80 KIDZ and Mustang as well as the yet unreleased song Chocolate that the band performed during its 2010 concerts.

== Track listing ==
All lyrics by John Stargasm, except where noted.

1. Cold Love (4:28) - (Stargasm, Hasson)
2. Take It Easy (4:09) - (Remy)
3. Mother Allegra (3:05) - (Stargasm)
4. Mirror Mirror (5:15) - (Hasson, Remy, Stargasm)
5. Dream Maker (3:13) - (Stargasm)
6. The End of the World (3:51) - (Hasson, Stargasm, Remy)
7. This Light (4:21) - (Stargasm)
8. This War Is Silent (4:37) - (Stargasm, Remy)
9. Je T'attendrai (3:39)/ Joy, Success, Happiness (on the French released album) - (lyrics: Stargasm/Stargasm, Remy - music: Hasson, Stargasm, Remy)
10. Birds in My Head (1:59) - (Remy)
11. Kill the Surfers (3:07) - (lyrics: Stargasm, Remy - music: Waterlot, Remy, Hasson)
12. Interstellar Orgy (6:20) - (Remy, Stargasm, Waterlot)

Note: "Je t'attendrai" and "Joy, Success, Happiness" are the same song, but they are sung in French and English respectively. The lyrics are different. On the French version of the album, "Je t'attendrai" does not feature, being replaced by its anglophone homologue.

== Personnel ==
- John Stargasm - Vocals, keyboards, synthesizer, piano
- Mika "Nagazaki" Hasson - Bass
- Greg Remy - Lead guitar, sound effects, backing vocals
- Jean Montevideo - Rhythm guitar, synthesizer, backing vocals
- Tony "Babyface" Poltergeist - Drums
