= Memory of You =

Song by Girls Aloud
- A-side: "The Loving Kind"
- Written: 2004
- Released: 12 January 2009
- Recorded: 2008
- Genre: Electronica; house; trance
- Length: 3:48
- Label: Fascination
- Songwriter(s): Girls Aloud; Miranda Cooper; Brian Higgins; Tim Powell; Giselle Sommerville
- Producer(s): Brian Higgins; Xenomania

"Memory of You" is a song by British all-female pop group Girls Aloud recorded during sessions for their fifth studio album Out of Control (2008). The song was written by Girls Aloud, Miranda Cooper, Brian Higgins and his production team Xenomania, and produced by Higgins and Xenomania. Described as "more dance oriented than pop," the track is influenced by trance and progressive house music, originating as a track entitled "Japan" by trance project Cadence.

The song was originally released as a B-side to the 7" vinyl format of their 2009 single "The Loving Kind". Due to its overwhelming popularity with fans, it was later released in high quality on Girls Aloud's Singles Box Set (2009). The song received positive reviews from contemporary music critics, some of whom suggested that the track was better than its A-side. Nicola Roberts also included a solo version of "Memory of You" as a B-side to her single "Yo-Yo" (2012).

== Background and composition ==
"Memory of You" originated in 2004 as a song by Cadence, a trance project composed of Grammy-nominated DJ and producer Mike Koglin, Darren Edge and Paul Woods. The song, then entitled "Japan," was written by Koglin, Miranda Cooper, Brian Higgins, Tim Powell, and Giselle Sommerville, all members of Higgins' production team Xenomania, while Louise Griffiths provided vocals. Girls Aloud's "Memory of You" retained the same melody and lyrics, although the instrumental was completely different. A new verse was also added, earning Girls Aloud a co-writing credit.

The Girls Aloud version of the track retains Cadence's trance roots, having been described as "far more dance oriented than pop." Kimberley Walsh and Nicola Roberts are the only singers on this track, causing tabloid paper News of the World to wrongly identify the track as an "underground tune" recorded by Walsh and Roberts outside of Girls Aloud.

== Release ==
The song was originally released as a B-side to the 7" vinyl format of their 2009 single "The Loving Kind". Popjustice featured a 30-second clip of "Memory of You" as their Song of the Day prior to release. Due to its overwhelming popularity with fans, it was later released in high quality on Girls Aloud's Singles Box Set (2009). In 2012, Girls Aloud fans selected "Memory of You" to be one of ten songs included on the deluxe edition bonus disc of their greatest hits collection Ten (2012), receiving more votes than any other track.

Nicola Roberts also included a solo version of "Memory of You" as a B-side to her 2012 single "Yo-Yo", available as a "pre-order only" track. Roberts also included the Solo Version of “Memory of You” on the 10th anniversary album “Behind Cinderella's Eyes“, released in 2022.

== Critical response ==
Bradley Stern of MuuMuse labeled the song Girls Aloud's best b-side to date and stated that the song "near eclipses its host single." Peter Robinson, founder of Popjustice, expressed confusion regarding the song's lack of inclusion on Out of Control, stating, "the track’s chorus is better than a lot of the choruses that did make it onto the album." Robinson described "Memory of You" as a "glossy euro rave-up." In a review for Ten, Digital Spy's Robert Copsey described "Memory of You" as one of the best tracks on the album's second disc of fan favourites. James Fyfe of imediamonkey wrote, "Memory of You represents one of the few career misjudgements the group ever made; it’s ridiculous that this wasn’t a single, let alone that it wasn’t even included on their 2008 record Out of Control. It’s a truly phenomenal track."

== Credits and personnel ==
- Songwriting: Brian Higgins, Girls Aloud, Giselle Sommerville, Miranda Cooper, Tim Powell
- Production: Brian Higgins, Xenomania
- Keyboards: Brian Higgins, Sacha Collision, Tim Powell
- Mixing: Sacha Collision, Tim Powell
- Mastering engineer: Dick Beetham at 360 Mastering.
- Published by Warner Chappell/Xenomania/EMI Music Publishing Ltd.
