= Sharko =

Belgian indie pop-rock band

Sharko is a Belgian indie pop-rock band formed by David Bartholomé (bass guitar, guitars, vocals) in 1997. Sharko released its first album, Feuded in 1999, on the indie Belgian label BANG! The album has also been released in France and the Netherlands and received a very positive press coverage. Helped on stage by guitar player Teuk Henri, Sharko toured those three countries in 2000 and gained a reputation as a live act. On this tour, they opened for acts like Muse, Venus, Arno, or Paul Weller.

The second album, Meeuws 2, was released in February 2001 in Belgium, France, Switzerland, the Netherlands, and Italy. Produced by Mike Mogis (from the American band Bright Eyes), Meeuws 2 includes "I Went Down" which became an underground hit in Belgium, the Netherlands and France. David and Teuk were then joined by drummer Julien Paschal. In 2003, the album was released in Britain where it got good reviews in papers such as NME, The Face and The Independent. The band toured England in the summer while recording their third album ("TimeOut" even declared their London gig "concert of the week").

Released in September 2003 in Belgium, Sharko III was later released in France, the Netherlands, Switzerland, and Japan. In February 2004, Sharko played with fellow bands Ghinzu and Girls in Hawaii a sold out Ancienne Belgique in Brussels. The album received great reviews, especially in France where Sharko became an acclaimed indie act as the single Spotlite enter the playlist of French mainstream radio France Inter.

The year 2005 was a dark year for David Bartholomé who almost decided to end Sharko. Instead of this, the trio entered in contact with producer Dimitri Tikovoï (Placebo, The Horrors, Goldfrapp) to start the recordings of their fourth album. Molecule was released in October 2006 in Belgium and the Netherlands and received great reviews. The sound of the album differs from its predecessors, having more density and depth. Molecule ended the year reaching number 1 on the iTunes French download indie chart. In January 2007, Sharko sold out the Ancienne Belgique in Brussels. Molecule was later released in France, Switzerland and Australia.

In 2008, Sharko toured in Canada and in New York City, they played in clubs such as Arlene's Grocery or Piano's. During the summer, Julien Paschal quit the band and was replaced by Charles De Croix.

In 2009, they released fifth album "Dance on the Beast" which tried to surf on a more dance-oriented wave. The album was not so well received, either by the press nor the audience. "Dance on the Beast" surprised many fans by its "dance" sound and didn't instantly find the irony which suited the previous albums.

In July 2010, a compilation "BeAst of Sharko" was released on digital platforms. Sharko then went on tour with new drummer Laurens Smagghe.

In 2016, after a 6-year hiatus, Sharko, with the help of new drummer Olivier De Cox, comes back with the album "You Don't Have To Worry" which includes the singles "You Don't Have To Worry", "Shalaine" and "Galileo". Being unsatisfied with the global reception of the album he considered being his best to date, frustrated not to get enough airplays on the radio, David Bartholomé then throws himself into a lengthy "hometour", doing concerts at people's home playing adapted acoustic versions of Sharko songs.

Before the enthusiastic reactions and at the peak of that tour, Sharko (now mainly David Bartholomé) releases the album "Hometour Acoustic Woaw" in 2017, promoting it only through real home tours. The album contains a lighter "reggae" version of "When I Was Your Age" (an ode to Justin Bieber) which finally gains airplays in Belgium. The hometour resumes in 2018.

In 2019, riding the success of the Hometour (more than 250 living-room concerts), Sharko recorded a fully electro-oriented album with Luuk Cox at the ICP Studios in Brussels.

Three years later, Sharko returned to rock as a trio in the spring of 2022 (with the ‘Vintage E.P.’) and later that year with the album ‘WE LOVE YOU DAVID’. This “back to rock” format allowed the band to reconnect with its audience, regain radio airplay, and fill venues across the French-speaking Community of Belgium.

Celebrating 25 years of the project and its tenth studio album, Sharko then released the aptly titled ‘10’ in 2024, enhanced by a blazing brass section. It is with this lineup that the singer defend the album on summer festival stages.

== Discography ==
- Feuded (1999)
- Meeuws 2 (2001-2003 UK)
- Sharko III (2004)
- Molecule (2007)
- Dance On The Beast (2009)
- Beast of Sharko (2010)
- You Don't Have To Worry (2016)
- Hometour Acoustic Woaw (2017)
- Glucose (2019)
- WE LOVE YOU DAVID (2022)
- 10 (2024)

Current band members besides David Bartholomé playing bass and singing: Guillaume Vierset (on guitars) and Olivier Cox (on drums)
