= Dimitri Tikovoï =

French-born music producer

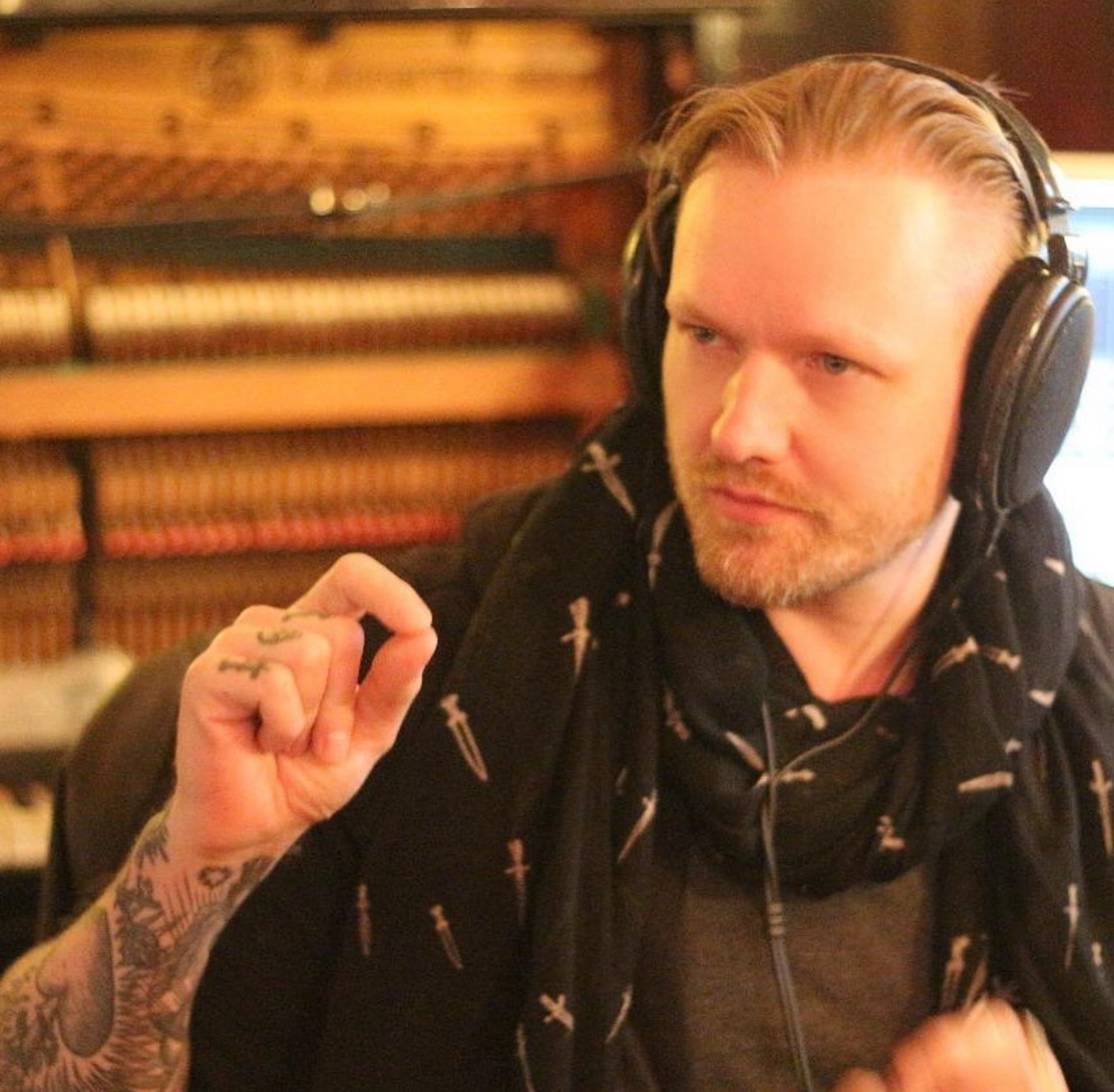

Background information
- Born: 10 December 1972 (age 53); Paris, France
- Genres: Indie rock, punk rock, hip hop, pop, dance
- Occupations: Record producer, songwriter, musician, DJ
- Instruments: Drums, bass, guitar, keyboard, percussion
- Years active: 2000–present
- Website: www.dimitritikovoi.com

Dimitri Tikovoï is a Paris-born, classically trained, Grammy-nominated producer, songwriter, and multi-instrumentalist.

Over the years, Dimitri has worked across genres, collaborating with artists including Charli XCX, Blondie, Purple Disco Machine, Ghost, The Horrors, Ashnikko, Becky Hill, Black Honey, Mikky Ekko, TWICE, Marianne Faithfull, Sophie Ellis-Bextor and John Cale amongst others, while also composing for film and TV soundtracks.

He recently produced The Libertines’ first UK #1 album, All Quiet On The Eastern Esplanade.

== Career ==
After training at the Conservatory of Classical Music in Paris and touring as a drummer, he moved to London, producing Placebo’s platinum-selling album Meds and launching the electronic-rock project Trash Palace. He also worked on Placebo remixes including a cover of Kate Bush's "Running Up That Hill". He produced their the album Meds, which went on to sell over a million copies worldwide.

He has since worked with The Horrors, Charli XCX, Ed Harcourt, Nicola Roberts, Marianne Faithfull, Mnek, Champs, Paloma Faith and numerous UK based acts.Tikovoï has also written for movies including the award-winning (Sundance 2008) movie by Samuel Benchetrit J'ai toujours rêvé d'être un gangster and the Kevin McDonald movie State of Play. In 2012, Tikovoï was nominated for the MPG International Producer of the Year award.

Recently Tikovoï has produced and written songs for The Libertines’ All Quiet On The Eastern Esplanade, their first UK #1 album, Purple Disco Machine who scored #1 of the Airplay charts in Europe, Black Honey with two #1 album of the independent official U.K charts, Becky Hill, Blondie and Ghost who charted at #1 in the Billboard 200 charts and went top 10 in 15 countries.

== Production credits ==
- All Quiet on the Eastern Esplanade – The Libertines – 2023
- Lemonade – Black Honey – 2023
- Chewing-Gum – Bo Milli – 2023
- On Devient Fou – F.F.F – 2023
- Here Come the Early Nights – Spector – 2023
- Ballet Dancer – Noah Pearce – 2023
- Enter The Room – Ramona Flowers – 2023
- Cheap Love – Girli – 2023
- Heatwave in the Cold North – Reverend and the Makers – 2023
- A Fistful of Peaches – Black Honey – 2023
- In The Dark – Purple Disco Machine feat Sophie & The Giants – 2022
- Written & Directed – Black Honey – 2021
- My Life, My Canvas – Frank's White Canvas – 2020
- Girls Like Us – Twice – 2019
- Life in Colour – Andreya Triana – 2019
- Prequelle – Ghost – 2018
- Pollinator – Blondie – 2017
- Rude Love – Becky Hill – 2017
- Forgotten Pleasures – Findlay – 2017
- Eureka – Leslie Clio – 2015
- Vamala – Champs- 2015
- Give My Love to London – Marianne Faithfull – 2014
- Little Armageddon – Skip The Use
- Only Child – DedRekoning Featuring Sophie Ellis-Bextor – 2014
- True Romance – Charli XCX – 2013
- Never Forget – Bebe Black
- Kids – Mikky Ekko – 2013
- Death Wish – Bebe Black
- Is This Love – Maya von Doll – 2012
- Cinderella's Eyes – Nicola Roberts – 2011
- "If The Truth Be Told" – MNEK
- My Way – Ian Brown – 2009
- Mirror Mirror – The Irrepressibles – 2010
- Make a Scene – Sophie Ellis-Bextor – 2011
- Mirror/Mirror – Ghinzu – 2009
- Dance on the Beast – Sharko – 2009
- State of Play soundtrack for the Kevin Macdonald movie – 2009
- Battle for the Sun – Placebo – 2009
- See The Light – The Hours – 2009
- Strange House – The Horrors – 2007
- Extended Play 07 – Placebo
- Beautiful Lie – Ed Harcourt
- Never Before – The Ghost Frequency
- Actor/Actress – Fear of Music
- Communiqueur d'Amour Re-Mix – Les Ritas Mitsouko
- I Always Wanted to Be a Gangster soundtrack for the Samuel Benchetrit movie
- Nothing Means Everything – The Dykeenies
- Proud Sponsors of Boredom – Kill The Young
- Meds – Placebo
- The Horrors – The Horrors
- We Are Not The Enemy – Fear of Music
- Soulève-Moi – Elli Medeiros
- A l'Ouest – Pravda
- New Ideas – The Dykeenies
- Trip the Light Fantastic – Sophie Ellis-Bextor
- Monsieur Gainsbourg Revisited – Serge Gainsbourg
- That Great Love Sound – The Raveonettes
- The Servant – The Servant
- La Folie Douce – Elista
- Kill The Young – Kill The Young
- "Sane" – Archive
- Sing It Out – Hope of the States
- Molecule – Sharko
- Running Up that Hill – Placebo
- English Summer Rain – Single – Placebo
- Twist Re-Mix – Goldfrapp
- 5 Tracks E.P – John Cale
- Positions – Trash Palace
- Hybrid – Gary Numan
- Ill Gotten Gains – Michael J. Sheehy
- Sweet Blue Gene – Michael J. Sheehy
- Presque rien – Stefie Shock
- Black Market Music – Placebo
- Stranger Blues – Dream City Film Club
