= Champs (British band) =

UK pop rock band

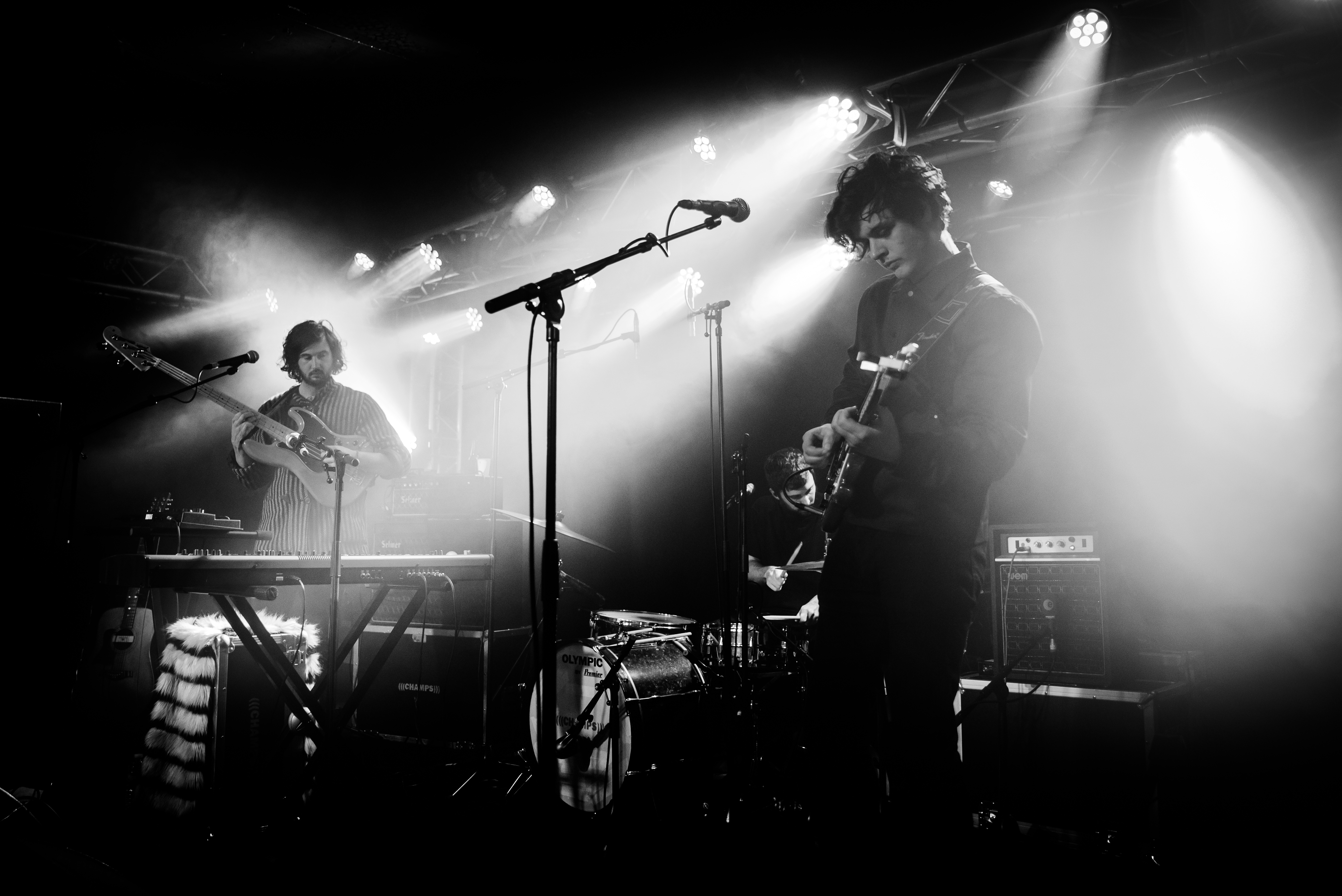
- Champs concert in Paris,2015

Background information
- Origin: Isle of Wight, England
- Genres: Pop rock
- Years active: 2012–present
- Label: PIAS Recordings
- Members: David Champion; Michael Champion
- Website: champsofficial.bandcamp.com/music

Champs are a UK based band formed of two brothers, Michael and David Champion.

== History ==
Their first album, Down Like Gold, was released in 2014, and recorded in the small coastal town of Ventnor located on the southern shore of the Isle of Wight.

Their second album, Vamala, was released in 2015.

Their third album, The Hard Interchange, was released in September 2019. The album was created over a span of three years.

Their fourth album Ride The Morning Glass was released in April 2023
