= Styled to Rock (British TV series) =

- Genre: Reality
- Presented by: Rihanna
- Judges: Nicola Roberts; Henry Holland; Lysa Cooper
- Voices of: Reggie Yates
- Country of origin: United Kingdom
- No. of series: 1
- No. of episodes: 10

Production
- Running time: 60 minutes (inc. adverts)
- Production companies: Twenty Twenty in association with Fenty Films, Overbrook Entertainment and Marcy Media Films

Original release
- Network: Sky Living
- Release: 14 August – 16 October 2012

Styled to Rock is a British reality television series on Sky Living, executive produced by Barbadian recording artist Rihanna which focuses on fashion design. The contestants compete with each other to create the best outfit for one or more famous music acts every week. They are restricted in time and materials. Their designs are judged and the music act of the week chooses their favorite one. One designer is eliminated each week.

On 25 October 2013, the American version of Styled to Rock premiered on Bravo.

== Format ==
Similar to the American series Project Runway, hosted by German top model Heidi Klum, the British series is also looking for new designers to create fashion for A-list celebrities in the world. Supported by their mentors, the candidates who were chosen as well as the mentors by Rihanna personally, fight in a ten-week battle for the final. Weekly the candidates design outfits for one or more music celebrities. Normally the celebrities select the winners outfit by themselves. Every week there is a winner, but also two candidates have to assert themselves in conversation again, until finally the worst of the week will be suspended. In the final, the two best designers fight to create an outfit for Rihanna herself, which she wore during her performance at the Wireless Festival on 8 July 2012.

The reason why Rihanna wanted to run this format just in the United Kingdom and especially in London, she told in the introduction of the first episode. She said that in London the "children of the street" have a unique street style, which has inspired numerous designers. Because these people can not show their talent easily, Rihanna wanted to give them a chance to get the attention they deserve. With the format also the candidates who have not managed in the show could eventually establish themselves independently in the fashion world through the hype and the media attention.

== Overview ==
Styled to Rock premiered its first season on 14 August 2012 at 9 pm.

== Mentors ==
The three mentors of the candidates were Nicola Roberts (British recording artist and entrepreneur), Henry Holland (British fashion designer, businessman and blogger) and Lysa Cooper (American celebrity stylist). The celebrities for which the candidates designed were Kanye West (not in show, Rihanna chose best outfit), Cheryl Cole, Katy Perry, the Saturdays, the Scissor Sisters, Pixie Lott, Rizzle Kicks, Tinchy Stryder, Little Mix and Little Boots.

| Mentor | Information |
|---|---|
| Nicola Roberts | British recording artist, member of Girls Aloud and entrepreneur |
| Henry Holland | British fashion designer, businessman and blogger |
| Lysa Cooper | American celebrity stylist, stylist for Rihanna |

== Contestants ==
The 12 fashion designers competing in the first season were:

| Contestant | Age | Job | Ranking | TOP |
|---|---|---|---|---|
| Sally Ellis | 26 | Fashion graduate & boutique owner | Rank 5 | 12 |
| Brett Mettler | 26 | Fashion graduate & latex designer | Rank 8 | 11 |
| Anam Naseer | 24 | Sales assistant | Rank 11 | 10 |
| Chanelle Edwards | 29 | Part-time fashion student | Rank 12 | 9 |
| Ben Moriah | 24 | Fashion student | Rank 9 | 8 |
| Ricky | 24 | Fashion graduate & fashion retail assistant | Rank 7 | 7 |
| Ralph Rovero | 24 | Fashion graduate | Rank 10 | 6 |
| Meganne Murrin | 24 | Unemployed fashion graduate | Rank 6 | 5 |
| Steve Corcoran | 26 | Freelance designer | Rank 4 (former 3) | 4 |
| Jacqueline Loekito | 25 | Fashion graduate & sales assistant | Rank 3 (former 4) | 3 |
| Heidi May | 25 | Fashion graduate & waitress | Rank 1 | 2 |
| Zainab Vandu-Chikolo | 22 | Fashion graduate & fashion house assistant | Rank 2 | 1 |

== Challenges ==
| Designer | Episodes | | | | | | | | | | |
| Designer | 1 | 2 | 3 | 4 | 5 | 6 | 7 | 8 | 9 | 10 | |
|---|---|---|---|---|---|---|---|---|---|---|---|
| Zainab | WIN | IN | WIN | IN | WIN | WIN | LOW | LOW | LOW | WIN | WINNER |
| Heidi | IN | IN | WIN | IN | LOW | IN | WIN | WIN | WIN | LOW | RUNNER-UP |
| Jacqueline | IN | WIN | LOW | IN | LOW | IN | LOW | IN | WIN | ELIM | |
| Steve | IN | WIN | WIN | WIN | LOW | IN | LOW | IN | ELIM | | |
| Meganne | IN | IN | LOW | IN | WIN | LOW | LOW | ELIM | | | |
| Ralph | IN | IN | LOW | IN | WIN | WIN | ELIM | | | | |
| Ricky | LOW | IN | LOW | IN | WIN | ELIM | | | | | |
| Ben | IN | IN | WIN | LOW | ELIM | | | | | | |
| Chanelle | IN | LOW | WIN | ELIM | | | | | | | |
| Anam | IN | IN | ELIM | | | | | | | | |
| Brett | IN | ELIM | | | | | | | | | |
| Sally | ELIM | | | | | | | | | | |

Green background and WINNER means the designer won Styled to Rock.
Purple background and RUNNER-UP means the designer was the runner-up on Styled to Rock.
Blue background and WIN means the designer won that challenge.
Turquoise background and WIN means the designer won that intercalated challenge.
Orange background and LOW means the designer was in the bottom two (or more), but was not eliminated.
Red background and ELIM means the designer lost and was out of the competition.

== Episodes ==
| Episode | Challenge | Judges | Winner | Low | Out | Broadcast | Special guests | Notes |
|---|---|---|---|---|---|---|---|---|
| 1 | Outfit for Kanye West | Nicola Roberts, Henry Holland, Lysa Cooper | Zainab | Ricky, Sally | Sally | 14 August 2012 | None | Sally first to be eliminated |
| 2 | Outfit for British urban duo, Rizzle Kicks; Outfit for British singer, Pixie Lott | Nicola Roberts, Henry Holland, Lysa Cooper | Steve and Jacqueline (Rizzle Kicks); Meganne (Pixie Lott) | Channelle, Brett | Brett | 21 August 2012 | Rizzle Kicks; Pixie Lott | N/A |
| 3 | Outfits for British girlband, Little Mix | Nicola Roberts, Henry Holland, Lysa Cooper | "Team Steve": Steve (leader), Heidi, Chanelle, Ben, Zainab (chosen by Little Mix) | "Team Jacqueline": Jacqueline (leader), Ricky, Ralph, Meganne, Anam (alone) | Anam | 28 August 2012 | Kimberley Walsh; Little Mix | Judges felt Anam was not a team player |
| 4 | Outfit for British singer, Katy B | Nicola Roberts, Henry Holland, Lysa Cooper | Steve (chosen by Katy B) | Channelle, Ben | Channelle | 4 September 2012 | Katy B | N/A |
| 5 | Outfit for British girlband, The Saturdays | Nicola Roberts, Henry Holland, Lysa Cooper | "Team Meaganne": Meganne (leader), Zainab, Ricky, Ralph (chosen by The Saturdays) | "Team Heidi": Heidi (leader), Steve, Ben, Jacqueline | Ben | 11 September 2012 | The Saturdays | N/A |
| 6 | Outfits for Ana Matronic and Jake Shears | Nicola Roberts, Henry Holland, Lysa Cooper | Ralph (Jake's choice) and Zainab (Ana's choice) | Meganne, Ricky | Ricky | 18 September 2012 | Scissor Sisters | N/A |
| 7 | Outfit for Cheryl | Nicola Roberts, Henry Holland, Lysa Cooper | Heidi May (chosen by Cheryl) | Steve, Ralph, Zainab, Meganne, Jacqueline | Ralph | 25 September 2012 | Cheryl | N/A |
| 8 | Outfit for Katy Perry | Nicola Roberts, Henry Holland, Lysa Cooper | Heidi May (chosen by Katy Perry) | Zainab, Meganne | Meganne | 2 October 2012 | Katy Perry | Quarter final; Judges and contestants flew out to New York City to meet Perry |
| 9 | Outfit for Little Boots; Outfit for Tinchy Stryder; Outfit for Nicola Roberts | Nicola Roberts, Henry Holland, Lysa Cooper | Heidi May (chosen by Nicola Roberts and Little Boots), Jacqueline (chosen by Tinchy Stryder) | Steve, Zainab | Steve | 9 October 2012 | Little Boots; Tinchy Stryder | Semi-final |
| 10 | Outfit for Rihanna (executive producer) to wear at her Wireless Festival performance (grand prize) | Nicola Roberts, Henry Holland, Lysa Cooper | Zainab, (show winner) | Heidi (runner up) | Jacqueline (top 3) | 16 October 2012 | Rihanna | Final |
