= Lucky Day (Nicola Roberts song) =

Single by Nicola Roberts

from the album Cinderella's Eyes
- B-side: "Fix Me"
- Released: 16 September 2011
- Recorded: August 2010
- Genre: Dance-pop; synth-pop
- Length: 3:22
- Label: Polydor
- Songwriter(s): Nicola Roberts; Dragonette; Deekly; Andras Vleminckx
- Producer(s): Martina Sorbara

Nicola Roberts singles chronology
"Beat of My Drum" (2011)	"Lucky Day" (2011)	"Yo-Yo" (2012)

Music video
- "Lucky Day" on YouTube

Audio sample
- file; help

"Lucky Day" is a song by British recording artist Nicola Roberts. It was released on September 18, 2011, under label Polydor Records as the second single from Roberts debut album Cinderella's Eyes. The song was written by Roberts and was produced by Canadian electropop group Dragonette. "Lucky Day" is an upbeat pop song featuring synths; lyrically the song talks of a boy not succumbing to Roberts' advances but doing so eventually, although she stated the concept relates to all aspects of life and luckiness in general. Roberts' vocals have been compared to that of Liza Minnelli and the track has been compared to the music of David Guetta and the Katy Perry track "Last Friday Night (T.G.I.F.)".

The song was well received by contemporary critics, who noted the success of the Dragonette-production, in addition to reviewers who called it a good follow-up single to her debut due to the successful pop themes and potential of the track. Commercially the track debuted at number 40 in both the UK Singles Chart and the Scottish Singles Chart. A music video directed by Stephen Agnes was released; the video was filmed in the East Village of New York City and presented Roberts walking down various streets in the city with special effects added to her movements. During the shoot, weather conditions made it uncomfortable for filming, although this was not reflected in critical opinion. The video's simplicity, as well as the dress she wore in the video, gained mixed responses from critics.

== Background ==
Released after the moderate commercial success of "Beat of My Drum", it was confirmed that "Lucky Day" would be released as the second single from Roberts debut album, Cinderella's Eyes, with a release date of September 18, 2011. Roberts unveiled the track as the second single on her website, declaring "it's very different to Beat Of My Drum" because it was important to show multiple sides to the Cinderella's Eyes album. Roberts chose the track as the second single in an effort to "show that the album is quite diverse", and although the release came after the summer period she found it to be a "summer track", and found that the reaction from her label, the media and her fans had been positive.

== Writing and development ==
The song was co-produced by Canadian electro-pop band Dragonette, with Martina Sorbara. Roberts stated that Dragonette were among the first people who worked on the record. Roberts discussed the 1940s influence on the record, noting "When I wrote 'Lucky Day' I had short hair and was really into '40s fashion. All of the 'woah woah woah woah' and the 'ah ha' really is a reflection of that." She stated that when it came to the production of the track she wanted to produce a "more downbeat dance record" noting it was what she was into at that point. The track was written in February 2010, and when asked about working with Dragonette on the track, Roberts responded, "I was with them for quite a while writing, and they were the first people that I went in with when I started making the record. I learnt a lot from them. They're really lovely people, they work really hard, they're so talented."

== Music and lyrics ==
"Lucky Day" is a pop song featuring an upbeat rhythm and synths. The song has gathered comparisons to the Katy Perry song "Last Friday Night (T.G.I.F.)" (2010) and music by David Guetta for its dance themes. In the introduction Roberts sings "Could it be my lucky day?"; the track continues with "Just light the first spark, and watch the fireworks explode. Boom, Boom, Baby", in what has been described by Robert Copsey of Digital Spy as a "60s-swing-meets-East-London vibe". Roberts' voice has been described by Katherine St Asaph of Pop Dust as a "springy" vibrato, with breathy background vocals featuring sounds effect including repeated kissing noises. Roberts sings about falling in love with someone, as she sings: "Aah, say that you love me, say that you need me too... best you ever had. It could be so easy, for you to please me, baby. So how come you tease me?". Roberts discussed the track on her blog, commenting that its lyrical content alludes to a boy that initially does not share the same feelings as his partner, "but in the end you win him over and it's your lucky day. You can take it however you want though, maybe you won on the scratch cards and so you had a lucky day, that kind of thing". Roberts described it as a "romantic reference" with a "down-beat track underneath", and in contrast called the top-line of the track "quite cute and girly". A remix of the song was producer by band White Lies, and debuted on The Guardian. The 90s-themed concept incorporates house music, with "chunky" beats and "twinkly" synths to the original instrumental of the song.

== Critical reception ==
"Lucky Day" was well received by contemporary critics. Popjustice responded positively: "It must be hard being Nicola Roberts. Imagine living your life knowing that at any point you might be CRUSHED BY THE WEIGHT OF YOUR OWN AMAZINGNESS", noting that the band Dragonette was a large part behind the success of the track. Dan Lambden from the online magazine So So Gay found the song to be a "perfect medium between classic pop lyrics" and "a pulsating dance beat", and positively commented on the riffs within the track stating they would "satisfy the most Hoxton of hipsters". Emily Mackay from NME declared "I'd be a bit freaked out by a phonecall like that" in response to the lyrics "I’d like a phone call/I’d like to hear something like this—WAHWAHWAHWAH". Mackay called the track "classy" and concluded her review saying "the sugar-spun electropop goes down smooth." Despite listing "Lucky Day" as one of the singles of the week, Alex Macpherson of Metro gave a predominantly negative review noting "She’s lionised by a cult fan base, but wider appeal remains elusive" and further explaining that "her voice is simultaneously too weak and shrill to carry".

== Music video ==
=== Background ===
Stephan my director had only really worked with indie bands, like White Lies. I knew he had never shot a pop video before, but I liked that. He's one of those trendy guys into trendy things and he said he wouldn't usually do it but he thought I was cool (thats nice isn't it) and so we both gave each other a chance in that respect!

— Roberts on her official website discussing director Stephen Agnes.

The music video for "Lucky Day" was directed by Stephen Agnes; it was filmed in New York City, on the East Village. During the production of the music video, they were not allowed to play music on the streets and so Roberts had to wear an ear piece with the track playing, of which she stated people were staring at as she was jumping around on the set with no music playing so people did not understand what she was doing. Roberts expressed her discomfort with the shoot due to the weather saying;

The video was really relaxed... it was so hot. I was literally dripping! Not nice! In between takes I had about 5 fans on me, one up the front of my dress, one up the back of my dress. I was wearing trainers again—I learnt from the day before that I needed to bandage my feet up so they couldn't expand anymore! We couldn't play music on the street so I was wearing an ear piece with my track playing. Loads of people were stopping and looking at me like I'd lost it, jumping up and down to what they thought was no music playing! Gotta do what you gotta do! Everyone worked so hard in getting the video together considering the conditions, I was really grateful!

=== Synopsis ===
The music video features Roberts performing in the East Village in New York City, while special effects changed the tone throughout the music video.

The video starts with a coin dropped onto ground after which a title card that reads Roberts' name and the track title is shown. As the title changes color, Roberts walks and skips down a New York City street wearing a floral T-shirt dress. Effects are placed on Roberts' with sperm cells graffitied on it shadow her movement with neon colors and throughout becomes increasingly prominent, and during the second verse Roberts performs a short dance movement with two back-up dancers before she walks past a wall with sperm graffitied on it, which also changes to multiple neon colours. As the video progresses, Roberts interacts with buildings and objects, such as New York style newspaper dispensers and following this her entire body has effects placed upon it as she changes color and shades and the last frames of the video show more of the same effects and finally shows a frame of a New York street with Roberts walking out of the frame before the camera moves upwards to show a purple sky.

=== Release and reception ===
OK! magazine responded well whilst noting her unusually short dress in the video, they said "we can't help but feel upbeat and summery when watching the star bounce about for single Lucky Day." Aaron Spencer-Charles of Metro gave a mixed review, whilst describing the video, he ended with "and that's it really. Nicola strolls along with a few colourful effects to keep things interesting. Maybe adding a male model would have made things a bit livelier." Popjustice commented on Nicola's seemingly lack of confidence in the video, stating Nicola, you light up our world like nobody else. But when you smile at the ground it ain't hard to tell, you don't know you're beautiful. Her short-dress in the video sparked criticism from some critics, to which Roberts responded saying "I'm not safe with fashion, and I haven't been for a long time. I liked it, and everybody on the team liked it on the day. It was 120 degrees, so anything longer, I'd have died."

== Formats and track-listings ==
- CD single
1. "Lucky Day" – 3:20
- 7" vinyl
1. "Lucky Day" – 3:20
2. "Lucky Day" (Ed Wilder Remix) – 4:00
- Maxi single
1. "Lucky Day" – 3:20
2. "Fix Me" (Roberts, Tikovoi) – 3:07
3. "Lucky Day" (Digital Dog Electro Club Mix) – 6:13
4. "Lucky Day" (RAW Club Mix) – 6:42
- Digital download
1. "Lucky Day" – 3:23
2. "Lucky Day" (Karaoke Version) – 3:20
3. "Lucky Day" (Digital Dog Electro Radio Mix) – 3:11
4. "Fix Me" – 3:07
5. "Cinderella's Eyes Mini Mix" (iTunes Store pre-order bonus track) – 4:18
- Digital mashup single
1. "Lucky Day" (Thriller Jill's 'Rhythm Is a Dancer' Mashup) – 3:11
2. "Lucky Day" (Thriller Jill's 'Rhythm Is a Dancer' Extended Mashup) – 5:33

== Charts ==
On the issue date of October 1, 2011 the single debuted at number 40 on both the Scottish Singles chart and the UK Singles Chart.

Chart (2011)	Peak position
Scotland (Official Charts Company)	40
UK Singles (Official Charts Company)	40

== Release history ==
Region	Date	Label	Format
Ireland	16 September 2011	Polydor Records	Digital download
United Kingdom	18 September 2011	Polydor Records	Digital download
United Kingdom	19 September 2011	Polydor Records	CD Single, 7" Vinyl
