= Ghinzu =

Belgian alternative rock band

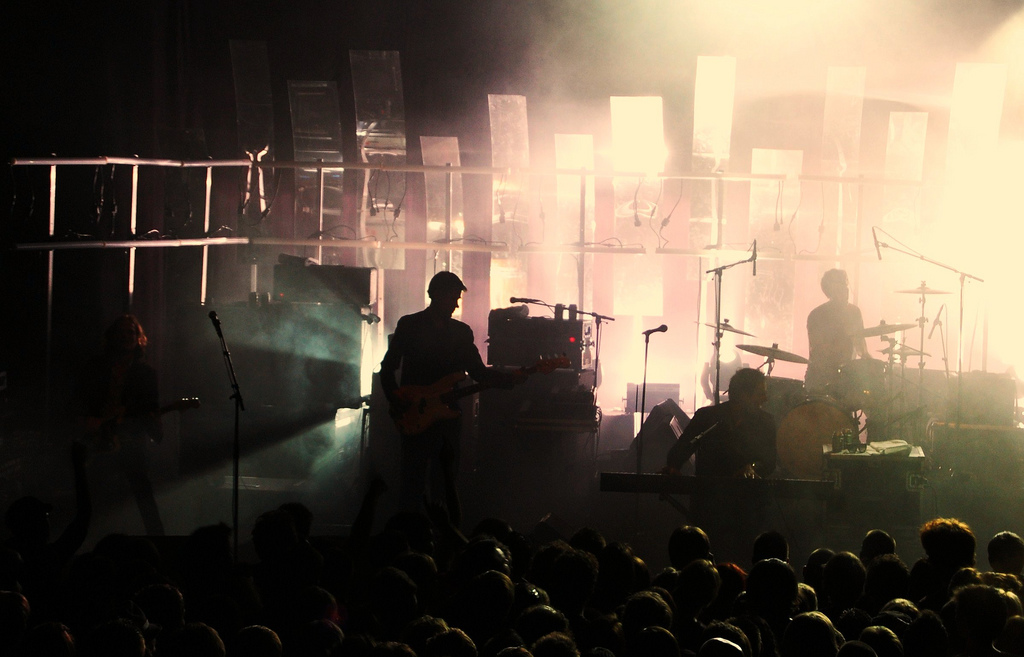
- Ghinzu live in Strasbourg, France, April 2009

Background information
- Origin: Brussels, Belgium
- Genres: Alternative rock
- Years active: 1999–present
- Label: PIAS
- Members: John Stargasm; Mika Nagazaki; Greg Remy; Antoine Michel; Jean Waterlot
- Past members: Sanderson Poe; Fabrice George; Kris Dane
- Website: https://ghinzu.be

Ghinzu is a Belgian alternative rock band founded in 1999 in Brussels.

== History ==
=== Electronic Jacuzzi (2000) ===
The band released its first album, Electronic Jacuzzi in late 2000 on its own label Dragoon. Their sound is a kind of noisy rock, supported by a big and groovy rhythm and some electronic touches while their subject matters are, among others, sex, partying, and drugs. The album was only released in Belgium and sold enough at least to make another one.

=== Blow (2004–2008) ===
Their second LP, Blow, was released in February 2004 in Belgium. Things started to take off for Ghinzu at that time, with a sold-out gig at the Ancienne Belgique in Brussels with fellow bands Girls in Hawaii and Sharko and an album release in France, Switzerland, Germany and Scandinavia in September. Blow was a success, especially in Belgium and France where the single "Do You Read Me?" became a hit. In June 2005, Ghinzu sold out the mythic Olympia music hall in Paris, followed by concerts around Europe. They also played with Iggy & The Stooges in a Festival in France, Iggy Pop telling them after their gig: "You guys rock!". In the end, about 100,000 copies of Blow were sold across Europe.

In November 2005, due to popular demand, their first album was re-issued with a different track listing.

In 2006, the band wrote and recorded the soundtrack for the movie Irina Palm (directed by Sam Garbarski and starring Marianne Faithfull) which received a critical success at the Berlin Film Festival in February 2007. More collaborations with cinema were to follow. In 2006, their song "Blow" was used as closing track for the movie Ex Drummer, by Koen Mortier (based on a novel by Belgian writer Herman Brusselmans). Ghinzu songs also appear in Sky Fighters and Dikkenek.

Their song "The Dragster-Wave" from the album Blow, was used over the end credits of the 2008 movie Taken, as well as featuring in the film's trailer. The movie was a success in America and around the world, which allowed Ghinzu to reach a wider audience.

=== Mirror Mirror (2009–2010) ===
Ghinzu's third album, Mirror Mirror, was released on 30 March 2009, in Benelux, France and Switzerland. Mirror Mirror has been recorded during the previous two years in an office building in Brussels. It was then mixed in London by Klaxons and Libertines collaborator Nick Terry. Musically, the record has a wider and more direct sound than Blow. It also takes a more operatic rock approach, sometimes gathering together several songs into one same musical movement (as with "Mother Allegra", "Mirror Mirror" and "The Dream Maker" or with the three final tunes of the album).

The band started to tour Europe in spring 2009, playing several dates in France with Placebo as well as big summer festivals such as Rock Werchter, Eurockéennes and Paleo Festival. In October 2009, Ghinzu played at Le Zénith in Paris for the first time and in February 2010, the band played Forest National, the biggest venue in their hometown of Brussels. The band also opened for Muse in Nijmegen, Netherlands, during their Stadium Summer Tour, on 19 June 2010.

Mirror Mirror was then released internationally during summer 2010. On 6 December 2010, an EP of remixes of songs on Mirror Mirror was digitally released under the name The Mirror Mirror Remix EP.

=== W.O.W.A. (2011–present) ===
On 2 March 2011, John Stargasm announced on his Twitter account that Ghinzu was working on a new album. A release was later scheduled for 2016, then for 2017 but no new music came out even though the band played a few festivals during that period of time.

In June 2024, Ghinzu played three sold out concerts at the Ancienne Belgique in Brussels to celebrate the twenty years of Blow. On 4 June, John Stargasm announced in an interview for the Belgian newspaper Le Soir that "there will be a new Ghinzu album in 2025".

W.O.W.A. was eventually released on 29 May 2026. It was preceded by three singles: "Out of Control", "Snow White" and "Forever". The band embarked on a European tour in June.

== Members ==
- John Descamps (also known as John Stargasm) (voice, keyboards)
- Mika "Nagazaki" Hasson (bass), full name Michael Salvatore Hasson
- Greg Remy (guitar & Weird things), full name Gregory Philip N. Remy
- Jean Waterlot (guitar, Keys), full name Jean Lucien Louis Waterlot
- Antoine Michel (drums)

=== Past members ===
- Sanderson Poe (upright bass, backing vocals)
- Fabrice George (drums)
- Kris Dane (keyboards, guitar, backing vocals)

== Discography ==
=== Albums ===
- Electronic Jacuzzi (2000; reissued in 2005)
- Blow(2004)
- Mirror Mirror (2009)
- W.O.W.A. (2026)

== Charts ==
Year	Album	Charts			
Year	Album	FRA	BEL (WA)	BEL (FL)	SWI
2000	Electronic Jacuzzi	181	95	—	—
2004	Blow	78	13	—	—
2009	Mirror Mirror	17	2	37	92
2026	W.O.W.A.	55	2	88	—
