= Nicola Roberts =

British singer-songwriter (born 1985)

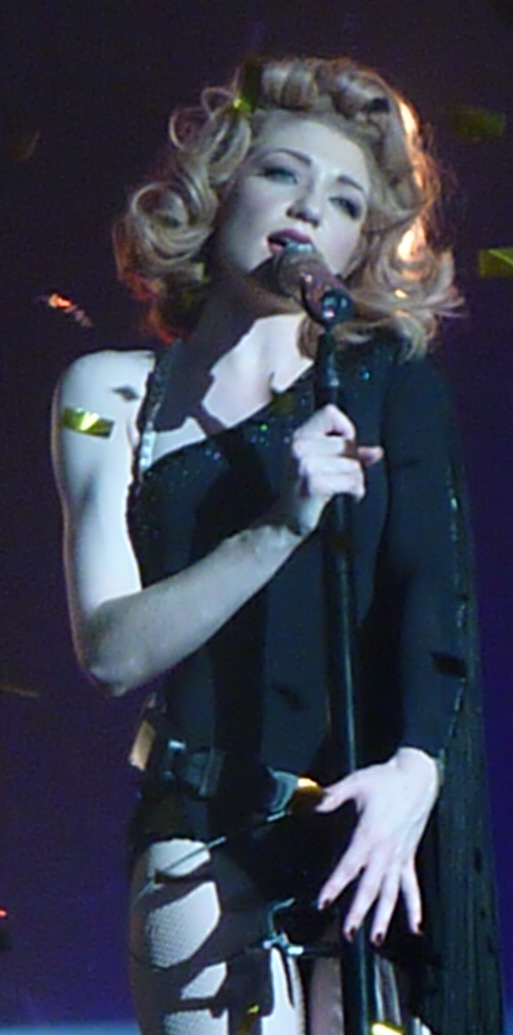
- Roberts at Newcastle Out of Control Tour 2009

Background information
- Born: Nicola Maria Roberts; 5 October 1985 (age 40); Stamford, Lincolnshire, England
- Origin: Runcorn, Cheshire, England
- Genres: Pop; dance-pop; synth-pop
- Occupations: Singer; songwriter
- Instrument: Vocals
- Works: Solo discography; Girls Aloud discography and songs
- Years active: 2002–present
- Labels: Polydor; A&M
- Member of: Girls Aloud
- Website: nicolarobertsmedia.com

Nicola Maria Roberts (born 5 October 1985) is an English singer and songwriter. In 2002, Roberts was selected as a member of Girls Aloud, a pop girl group created through ITV's reality competition show Popstars: The Rivals. The group went on to receive large success, achieving a string of 20 consecutive UK top ten singles (including four number ones), two UK number one albums, five consecutive platinum-selling studio albums, and receiving nominations for five BRIT Awards, winning Best Single in 2009 for "The Promise".

In 2011, Roberts released her debut solo studio album, Cinderella's Eyes, which peaked at number 17 on the UK Albums Chart. Its lead single, "Beat of My Drum", debuted at number 27 on the UK Singles Chart. Two follow-up singles, "Lucky Day" and "Yo-Yo", both gained equally positive critical responses.

In February 2020, Roberts won the first series of ITV's The Masked Singer UK, masked as Queen Bee, and the following year, Roberts returned in the final of the second series as a guest judge.

== Early life ==
Roberts was born on 5 October 1985 in Stamford, Lincolnshire, when her mother was 17. At the time of her birth, her father was working for the RAF and the resulting pay led to financial struggles which saw her father move to work for the Ford Motor Company whilst her mother became a photographer to help the family monetary problems. Roberts grew up in Runcorn, Cheshire.

She attended St Chad's High School. In school Roberts found herself shying away, in contrast to her home life where she was outgoing, even gaining the nickname 'Cilla' (after singer Cilla Black) from her family. Academically, Roberts performed well, leaving with nine GCSEs, but she declared her dislike of school and began discussing a musical career which led her to work with several girl groups recording demo tracks in several cases. Roberts acknowledged she had always wanted to be a singer and had been entering competitions and auditions with her father accompanying her and gaining support from other family members also. In an interview with Closer magazine, Roberts spoke about how she began her musical career at a local disco, as part of a girl band called The 5 Musketeers.

== Music career ==
=== 2002: Popstars: The Rivals ===
Still a teenager, Roberts auditioned for the reality television series Popstars: The Rivals. Participants checked into a hotel in Kensington, London, before performing to a panel of celebrity judges; Roberts found that, up to that point, she "didn't really have much life experience". During the auditions she coincidentally sat next to Kimberley Walsh, who was to complete the competition to become one of five in the final line-up of the girl group; the two spent time rehearsing before their solo audition. Roberts felt confident before the audition, but during the actual audition she was "terrified" and was unable to smile until celebrity judge Geri Halliwell complimented her performance stating "I think you're great, you're an individual, you really stand out". Roberts found her clothing and personality were different from those of the other participants in Popstars: The Rivals; most were well-trained vocalists and were well-dressed, while her clothing was less fashionable, due to lack of funds, and she was not as vocally well-trained as the others.

Having progressed in the competition, Roberts was left as one of 15 remaining participants but found that the reality show was becoming increasingly based on personality instead of vocals. She found her personality to be more concealed than others', but was "confident" with her performances. One notable incident during the competition was when a show-producer expressed to her mother that Roberts would not win, for she was not "outrageous" or as outgoing as others stating that vocals were secondary. This left her mother shocked by the politics of the show. After the final ten participants were selected Roberts was eliminated from the competition, but in the following weeks after participant Nicola Ward quit, she was enlisted as a wild-card to return to the show – despite reservations from judge Louis Walsh, who did not back her return. However, he was overruled by judges Geri Halliwell and Pete Waterman. Roberts then made it through to the final where she sang the track "I'm So Excited" by the Pointer Sisters. She was the second contestant to be selected for the group, after Cheryl Tweedy. That night the group was formed, and a party involving promotional photographs saw their introduction to manager John McMahon, who would become more of a personal friend for the group.

Roberts described her time on the show Popstars: The Rivals and her successes within the show: "Every week before I went on stage I used to go to the toilet, to the same cubicle, and pray, just ask God to please let me have this. Even though I was confident in my singing ability, and I knew I had a stronger voice than most at the time same time I still had a little bit of insecurity because I'd been told Louis didn't want me. I was never in the bottom two, though, and the producers told me I always came in the top two or three in terms of votes each week, which was great."

=== 2002–2009: Girls Aloud ===
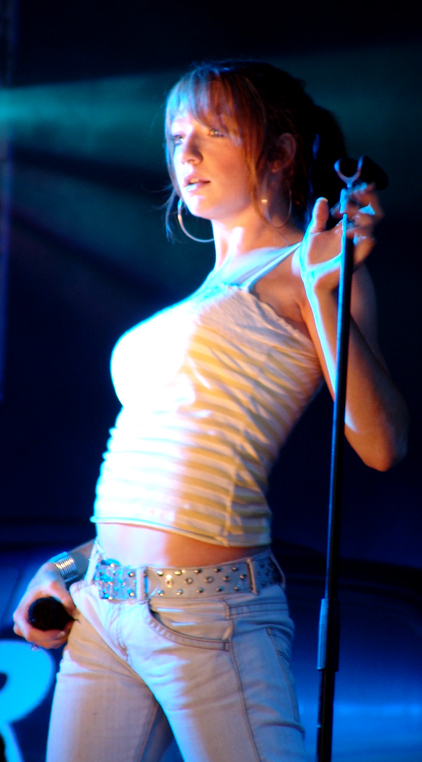
Roberts performing with Girls Aloud in 2004

"The people we knew, that I'd grown up with and had relationships with, just didn't see me as Nicola anymore; it was like I was this famous person and they didn't know how to speak to me. Even the boy I liked – all that had gone. I'd had such happy times there, having parties loads of us sleeping on the beach, and it just wasn't the same. People treated me differently."

— Roberts describing her return to her childhood holiday home in Cornwall.

After their formation on Popstars: The Rivals, the group Girls Aloud went on to record their debut single and music video. In addition to that, a large stint of publicity left the group exhausted, since McMahon continually pressured them to promote the single "Sound of the Underground". At this point, the competition with Popstars: The Rivals was still ongoing with the two groups; Girls Aloud and One True Voice competing to outsell each other with their debut single releases. Girls Aloud ultimately won the competition with their single topping the UK Singles Chart and gaining a record deal from Polydor Records. In the following days, however, news broke that McMahon had died in a car accident, shortly after texting Roberts, who was too busy to respond. The death of McMahon had a large impact on Roberts, who found herself increasingly emotionally unstable; it came at a time when she moved in with bandmate Cheryl Tweedy, this being the first time she had lived without her family. Thus, at this time Roberts was under great stress; the biggest problem, though, was the constant media criticism of her image, in which critics labelled her "unattractive".

Girls Aloud as a group enjoyed many successes, including two entries into the Guinness Book of World Records for "Most Successful Reality Television Group" and "Most Consecutive Top Ten Entries in the UK by a female group". In addition to this, the band gathered five BRIT Award nominations, winning Best British Single in 2009 for "The Promise". The group earned four UK number one singles, twenty consecutive UK top-ten singles and critically they have been well-received with most albums, although Roberts found at times critical opinion was "less than desirable". Their debut album, Sound of the Underground, peaked at number two in the UK and was certified Platinum. Their second album, What Will the Neighbours Say?, was certified double Platinum and peaked at number six. The third album, Chemistry, saw a critical improvement, but failed to enter the UK top ten. The fourth album, Tangled Up, became another Platinum-certified album, peaking at number four. Finally, their fifth record, Out of Control, became their first studio album to reach number one in the UK. In 2009, Girls Aloud took a break after embarking on their 2009 Out of Control Tour in support of the Out of Control album – which became their most extensive tour – and following this, each member took time to work on solo projects.

=== 2010–2013: Cinderella's Eyes, Girls Aloud reunion and other ventures ===
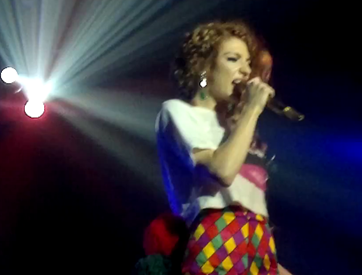
Roberts performing at G-A-Y in support of Cinderella's Eyes in 2011

"I've been looking at my album reviews today and, honestly, I could cry. It's a bit of a shocker. Someone tweeted me all of the mark-ups – the stars that the various papers had given it – and when you see them all collected like that, 4 out of 5 and 5 out of 5, it was just like: 'Oh my fucking god! That's incredible.' I could cry. It's quite amazing. And now the album's out there and I just have to hope that people like it. That's all I can ask for."

— Roberts discussing the acclaimed reviews for Cinderella's Eyes.

In the Girls Aloud 2008 biography Roberts expressed an interest in writing and recording her own material, wanting to experiment in the studio for better understanding of the process. She then started work in the recording studio, with producers such as; Dragonette, Diplo and Joseph Mount. Roberts after a year of recording announced that she would be releasing her debut album, Cinderella's Eyes. The first single "Beat of My Drum" had an on-sale release meaning it had little promotion beforehand and commercially it peaked at number 27 in the United Kingdom but critically it garnered acclaim from critics which Roberts described as "amazing". A second single, "Lucky Day", was released shortly after and whilst gaining positive reviews it failed to make an impact commercially peaking at number 40 in the UK. The album was then released on 23 September 2011, Roberts described the album as "electronically led", and the album was inspired by her time performing with Girls Aloud – "It would have been stupid for me to make an album that meant nothing" she said. For Roberts the album was about making a risky record, where there wasn't a guaranteed commercial success, explaining to The Guardian: "It's taken every last bit of confidence just to release this record, or maybe I've just brainwashed myself into feeling more confident. I don't know if it's good, or if I've just told myself it's good." The album was released to universal positive reviews from critics, reviewers such as Ludovic Hunter-Tilney of the Financial Times, James Lachno of The Daily Telegraph, Emily Mackay of NME, Hugh Montgomery of The Independent and others hailed it as the best solo record from a member of Girls Aloud. Commercially in the United Kingdom the album peaked at number 17 whilst on the Digital charts it peaked at number 13, in Scotland it charted at number 21 whilst in Ireland it peaked at number 48. In late 2012, Roberts admitted during a secret show at Carphones Warehouse on Oxford St, to a small pool of journalists, that she was content with and prepared for the potential commercial fallout of releasing an album that was 'unlike anything out there'. On 6 January, a third single from the album was released, titled "Yo-Yo"; the song was described as a "shining example of her pop sensibilities".

In January 2012, singer Rihanna chose Roberts to co-host Styled To Rock for Sky Living HD. Roberts was to act as an executive-producer and will search "for the next generation of undiscovered designer talent".

Nadine Coyle confirmed that Girls Aloud will perform shows around the country at the beginning of 2013 to celebrate their tenth anniversary. On 11 March, Kimberley Walsh announced that Girls Aloud had started work on a new album. Roberts was at the time a judge and mentor on Sky Living series Styled To Rock alongside fashion designer Henry Holland and Rihanna. Roberts co-penned "Going Nowhere" for girl group Little Mix's debut album, DNA. In December 2013 she received disc award for her help with writing the album. The award was presented to Roberts for her contribution to Little Mix's first album, DNA, as it has sold more than 700,000 copies worldwide.

After months of speculation, Girls Aloud's reunion would occur in November 2012. The reunion is said to coincide with their tenth birthday and the release of a charity single for Children in Need. On 31 August 2012, Cheryl confirmed on BBC Radio 1 and Capital FM that the group's new single will be released in November, teasing the lyrics "I just wanna dance". Girls Aloud reunited for the group's 10th anniversary. On 18 November 2012, the group released their new single, "Something New" which was the official charity single for Children in Need. The single peaked at number-two on the UK Singles Chart. The group released their second greatest hits compilation, Ten on 26 November 2012. The second single taken from Ten, "Beautiful Cause You Love Me" was released on 17 December 2012. A documentary special entitled 10 Years of Girls Aloud aired on ITV1 on 15 December 2012. In 2013, the group embarked on Ten - The Hits Tour 2013. At the conclusion of the tour, they announced their disbandment.

=== 2013–present: Planned second studio album, The Masked Singer, West End and further Girls Aloud reunion ===
In October 2011, Roberts stated that she had started work on a second album. In January 2012, commenting on the possibility of a new record, Roberts stated, "Maybe. I'm not sure. There's lots of stuff coming up and I think there always has to be a right time. I'm always working on music and if a second album came out then that would be a great thing to happen." During this period, Roberts focused heavily on songwriting for other artists. She contributed the track "On the Metro" to Girls Aloud’s second greatest hits album Ten (2012) and wrote two songs, "See Me Now" and "They Just Don't Know You", for Little Mix's second album, Salute (2013).

In January 2014, producer Fred Ball confirmed he was working with Roberts on a new album. Later that year, she wrote four songs for her friend and former colleague Cheryl's fourth studio album, Only Human (2014): "It's About Time", "Throwback", "Goodbye Means Hello" and "Yellow Love". Roberts collaborated with Cheryl again in 2018, co-writing the songs "Love Made Me Do It" and "Let You".

In December 2019, it was announced Roberts would make her West End debut in the musical City of Angels, playing the role of Avril/Mallory from March 2020. In 2020, she also participated in the first series of the ITV series The Masked Singer as Queen Bee and won the competition in the February finale. Later that year, on 15 August 2020, Roberts performed "The Captive's Hymn" at a VJ Day concert at Horse Guards Parade in London. On 4 June 2022, she performed "Climb Ev'ry Mountain" with Mica Paris and Ruby Turner at the Platinum Party at the Palace concert to celebrate the Platinum Jubilee of Queen Elizabeth II.

In late 2023, Girls Aloud announced that they would reunite for The Girls Aloud Show arena tour to celebrate more than 20 years in the industry and honour their late bandmate, Sarah Harding. The group toured throughout May and June 2024; it became the UK's biggest arena tour of the year, selling over 300,000 tickets. They also performed a sold-out show at Shepherd's Bush Empire and headlined Brighton Pride that summer.

Roberts returned to the West End in 2025, taking on the role of Persephone in the musical Hadestown at the Lyric Theatre. In January 2026, Roberts had to withdraw from the final week of performances to undergo a surgical procedure.

== Personal life ==
Despite a large amount of success as part of Girls Aloud, Roberts found time away from her family increasingly difficult. After her parents divorced and she experienced conflicts with her boyfriend, she found herself in a depressed state. Her hectic schedule led her to dissolve relations with family members and, after stating her frustration at her living situation, she started frequently returning to her home town of Runcorn, Cheshire. Her work life and home life saw her split into two different personalities; despite appreciating a career in the music industry, the conflicts with her personal life made her question her career.

Throughout her music career, Roberts was coping with hyperglycemia which is most likely caused by restricting what foods she would eat; whilst spending time on the road touring, she found it difficult not to eat convenience food. Her illness was diagnosed after extensive touring in which time Roberts complained of weakness and sickness which made it difficult to perform live concerts. Whilst she performed on Girls Aloud's Tangled Up Tour, Roberts' dog Elvis died just months after he was given as a gift to her. She found his death very upsetting and struggled to cope as she was on tour at the time.

Roberts announced on 25 December 2025, Christmas Day, she was five months pregnant with her first child, expecting the baby with her partner, footballer Mitch Hahn. In May 2026, Roberts announced that she had given birth to a daughter.

=== Stalker ===
A former partner sent Roberts 3,000 messages between 2012 and 2017 over Twitter and Instagram, some of which were described as "violent and threatening" when the case came to court. In May 2017, he admitted to one count of stalking and another to causing annoyance or inconvenience and was given a 15-month suspended sentence and a life-time restraining order not to contact Roberts or members of her family. However, he broke the restraining order within a few months. The Crown Prosecution Service (CPS) apologised to Roberts in 2018 for failing to prosecute this individual.

== Business ==
In 2007, Roberts started a limited production of a make-up range called Dainty Doll aimed at the pale-skinned market.

== Activism ==
=== Anti-tanning ===
At the start of her music career Roberts began to note that other girls were dressing more "glamorous" than she did, and at the age of 16 during her auditions for Popstars: The Rivals, she wished to look like them. At these times she would feel unattractive due to her pale complexion, and soon began using fake tan to darken her skin tone into what she later described as a "dirty mess" but at the time made her feel more attractive. Due to her pale skin tone Roberts found herself easily burning in the sun, which led to chronic pain; during the shoot of the Girls Aloud single "Love Machine" she had trouble filming due to severe burns, which left her wanting to visit the hospital. During her time with Girls Aloud she filmed a television special titled Passions for which she travelled to Taiwan where she learnt about natural skin products, something she had been interested in due to her pale complexion and led her to develop the make-up line Dainty Doll. Following this Roberts began a stance against tanning, which saw her produce and star in a BBC Three investigative documentary titled Nicola Roberts: The Truth About Tanning in which she revealed her own personal tanning issues and those of men and women throughout the UK who have excessively used tanning beds. She met with families of individuals who had died from melanoma, which encouraged Roberts to become an advocate for the banning of underage usage of tanning beds. With the help of Julie Morgan, a member of the National Assembly for Wales, she produced a bill in support of the ban. At the launch of the bill, Roberts said: "Going into the streets of Liverpool and interviewing the young girls who are obsessed with having a tan and feeling like they had to be brown to be seen as attractive, that whole mentality that they had gathered was just a bigger problem than I ever thought it was."

=== Anti-bullying ===
"The internet has really highlighted this issue. It shows us how easy it is for people to pass judgement on others and it also shows us that people now have a place for expression. Whether it be twitter or blog posts it gives people a place to offload. Whenever I have bought somebody's record I always flick through and search for the ones that I really relate to at that time, they become my favourites, I play that song to death and then the rest of the album gets its chance. Music is there to milk an emotion I think. Whether it be a party track when you want to feel sky high or an emotional song when you need something to draw out how you feel inside. That's my sticks+stones and it's so comforting to know that it's yours too. I'm going to try my best to speak to Michael Gove the educational secretary about how we can work out a better support system in schools for people finding themselves in unbearable situations every time they walk through the school gate… I'll keep you posted on that. Wish me luck!

— Roberts discussing Cinderella's Eyes track "Sticks + Stones" and her advocacy for anti-bullying which stemmed from writing the track.

After winning Popstars: The Rivals, becoming one fifth of Girls Aloud, Roberts soon found herself subject to bullying. She was branded "the ugly one" of the group, and would often "cry herself to sleep", finding herself to be a victim of "faceless" bullying fuelled by celebrities such as Chris Moyles and Lily Allen. Soon after, the comments had an effect on her mental stability; after suffering from an "identity crisis", the taunts brought her close to a breakdown, leaving her feeling "miserable and confused" and finding comfort in alcohol. Prior to her fame, Roberts never found flaws with her red hair, calling it a "prized possession" but after critics picked on her image she saw it as a flaw, with Roberts explaining: "I hated it and I hated people judging me. I'd put on the telly and there'd be someone saying something cruel, or I'd open up a magazine and read it. Normal people don't have people telling them day to day they're ugly or miserable. [...] I'd think, "stop being so vain, you've got this amazing job" but it wasn't enough. It didn't stop me feeling bad". "People feel they can say nasty things and have anonymity behind the net – as they did with all the nasty comments about me – without fear of recrimination", Roberts said. Five years after the bullying she found herself in a "better place", and critics commented on her image positively, with writers such as Clemmie Moodie from British newspaper Daily Mirror saying "the 25-year-old radiates confidence and, with a string of fashion successes has blossomed."

Roberts then wrote the track "Sticks + Stones" in response to these times; finding herself cautioned by the serious subject matter, she wanted to write a track that was not self-indulgent, featuring a "universal" chorus and lyrics such as "I was too young for so many things. Yet you thought I'd cope with being told I'm ugly". After the release of her debut album, Cinderella's Eyes, which featured the track, Roberts appeared on the British television show BBC Breakfast to discuss bullying in relation to the track. Soon afterward she advocated the issue on BBC News; in an interview she discussed the lyrical themes of the track, and during the interview named social networking site Twitter as being a tool which highlights the severity of the issue of bullying, finding the problem to be "out of control" in a schooling environment. Roberts continued to advocate on the issue of bullying; in an interview given to Rolling Stone, she stated she was "sick" of an image-driven society. After her success with the anti-tanning bill, Roberts took a similar stance with bullying, saying "it doesn't need to happen" and found that British laws were failing to combat the issue: "People are still scared to go to school, kids are threatening to kill themselves; it's disgusting that it persists. So, again, I'm giving a voice to a cause, to hopefully affect change." Roberts then approached the British education secretary Michael Gove to raise the issue.

== Discography ==
- Cinderella's Eyes (2011)

== Filmography ==
As herself
Year	Title	Notes
2002	Popstars: The Rivals	Winner
2005	Girls Aloud: Home Truths	—N/a
2006	Girls Aloud: Off the Record	—N/a
2007	St Trinian's	Cameo
2007	The Sunday Night Project	Presenter
2008	The Passions of Girls Aloud	—N/a
2008	Britannia High	Cameo
2008	The Girls Aloud Party	Presenter and performer
2009	Nicola Roberts: The Truth About Tanning	Presenter
2010	Britain's Next Top Model	Guest judge
2012	Girls Aloud: Ten Years at the Top	—N/a
2012	Styled to Rock	Mentor and judge
2013	Ten: The Hits Tour	—N/a
2020	Got What It Takes?	Guest judge
2020	VJ Day 75: The Nation's Tribute	Herself
2020–2022	The Masked Singer	2020: Winner, masked as Queen Bee; 2021: Guest panelist for the final episode 2022: Guest performer, as Queen Bee, with Robobunny
2022	Strictly Come Dancing Christmas Special	Herself

== Theatre ==
Year	Title	Role	Notes
2020	City of Angels	Mallory/Avril	Garrick Theatre, West End
2025-26	Hadestown	Persephone	Lyric Theatre, West End
