= On air on sale =

On air on sale is a policy in the music industry where recorded music is made available for sale at the same time as it is made available for radio broadcast, instead of several weeks later in order to let marketing "buzz" develop, as was former practice. The aim of the policy is to prevent copyright infringement by making legal digital downloads available as soon as possible. A relatively new development, it is controversial within the music industry.

In 2011, Sony Music announced that it would be dropping its on air on sale strategy in the United Kingdom. The strategy was put into practice early that year by both Sony and Universal in the UK, but has been largely abandoned in favor of "looking at each release on a case-by-case basis," according to a statement from Sony. Singles by Lady Gaga, Jessie J, and Chipmunk were released as part of this program.

== See also ==
- Record plugging
