= Wendy Morgan (director) =

Canadian film director

Wendy Morgan is a Canadian film director. She is most noted as director of the film Sugar Daddy, for which she won the DGC Award for Best Direction in a Feature Film from the Directors Guild of Canada in October 2021.

Morgan previously directed music videos for artists such as Gnarls Barkley, Janelle Monáe, The Kills, and Laura Mvula, as well as episodes of the television series Backstage and Little Dog.
