= 111 =

111 may refer to:

- 111 (number), the natural number following 110 and preceding 112
- 111 BC
- AD 111
- 111 (Australian TV channel), a TV channel now called Fox Funny
- 111 (New Zealand telephone number), the emergency telephone number in New Zealand
- NHS 111, a free-to-call non-emergency medical helpline in the UK
- (111) a Miller index for the crystal face plane formed by cutting off the corner equally along each axis
- 111 Ate, a main-belt asteroid

== Transport ==
- Swissair Flight 111, was a scheduled international passenger flight from John F. Kennedy International Airport in New York City, United States, to Cointrin Airport in Geneva, Switzerland
- Route 111 (MBTA), a bus route in Massachusetts, US
- 111 (New Jersey bus), a bus route operated by New Jersey Bus
- Tatra 111, a heavy truck manufactured by Tatra

== Music ==
- 111 (Her Majesty & the Wolves album)
- 111 (Željko Joksimović album)
- 111 (Pabllo Vittar album)

== See also ==
- III (disambiguation)
- List of highways numbered 111
- 1/11 (disambiguation)
- 11/1 (disambiguation)
- Roentgenium, synthetic chemical element with atomic number 111
