= CXI =

CXI can refer to:

- Cassidy International Airport, an airport at Banana, Kiribati in Oceania
- 111 (number), a number, in Roman numerals

- 111 (year), a year in the 2nd century, in Roman numerals
- 111 (disambiguation), several topics

- Corendon Airlines Europe, an airline based in Malta
- Currency Exchange International, an American currency exchange company, by stock ticker
