= Future Records =

British record label

- Parent company: Universal Music (2009-10); Sony Music UK
- Founded: 2009 (as Future Records); 2012 as (Future Music)
- Founder: Gary Barlow
- Status: Closed
- Distributor: Universal Music Group
- Genre: Pop, rap, rock, classical
- Country of origin: United Kingdom
- Location: London
- Official website: FutureRecords.com

Future Records was a music imprint, based in London, England. It was founded in 2009. The label was closed in 2012.

== History ==
In 2009, it was announced that Gary Barlow had been given his own music label, Future, by Universal as a reward for masterminding Take That's comeback and subsequent renewed success. Barlow stated that by creating his own label he would be able to provide an insight and first-hand experience of the music industry, and help new and exciting young talent emerge to build the future of the music industry.

Barlow's first signing was Camilla Kerslake. With Barlow's guidance her debut album entered the UK classical charts at number 4.

Barlow's second signing was Aggro Santos and two months later his debut single "Candy" charted at number 5 in the UK Singles Chart. His second single has since charted at number 19 in the UK singles chart and number 7 in the UK R&B Chart.

Barlow also signed Emma's Imagination, winner of the unsigned talent show Must Be The Music, to Future. She hit number 7 and number 10 in the UK Singles Chart with "Focus" and "This Day" respectively. Londoners Lonsdale Boys Club are the latest signing to Future, with an album scheduled for release in early 2012.

On 29 December 2012, Barlow announced the closure of Future Records so he could spend more time with his family. All artists signed to the label will be passed to the parent company Universal, and continue their current recording contracts.

== Label artists ==
- A*M*E
- Aggro Santos (2012)
- Camilla Kerslake (2010-2012)
- Delta Maid
- Emma's Imagination (2010-2012)
- Lonsdale Boys Club (2010-2012)
- The Struts

== Discography ==
=== Singles ===
- Aggro Santos

Title	Year	Peak chart positions		Certifications	Album
Title	Year	UK	IRE	Certifications	Album
"Candy" (featuring Kimberly Wyatt)	2010	5	14	UK: Silver	Aggro Santos.com
"Saint or Sinner"	2010	19	—		Aggro Santos.com
"Like U Like" (featuring Kimberley Walsh)	2010	8	17		Aggro Santos.com

- Emma's Imagination

Year	Single	Chart Positions	Album
Year	Single	UK	Album
2010	"This Day"	10	Stand Still
2010	"Focus"	7	Stand Still
2011	"Brighter Greener"	-	Stand Still

=== Albums ===
- Camilla Kerslake

Year	Information	Chart positions			Certifications
Year	Information	UK Album Chart	UK Classical Chart	Ireland	Certifications
2009	Camilla Kerslake: Released: 23 November 2009; Label: Future Records; Formats: CD, digital download	50	4	-	BPI: Silver

- Emma's Imagination

Year	Album details	Peak chart positions		
Year	Album details	UK	IRL	SCO
2011	Stand Still: Released 10 January 2011; Label: Future; Genre: Pop, Alternative	14	48	2
