= Stand Still =

Studio album by Emma's Imagination
- Released: 10 January 2011
- Recorded: October – November 2010
- Genre: Indie pop
- Length: 33:17
- Label: Future; Polydor
- Producer: Martin Terefe

Emma's Imagination chronology
Stand Still (2011)	Underway (2013)

Singles from Stand Still
- 1. "This Day" Released: 5 September 2010; 2. "Focus" Released: 19 September 2010; 3. "Faerie Lights" Released: 29 November 2010; 4. "This Day (re-recording)" Released: 2 January 2011; 5. "Brighter Greener" Released: 7 March 2011

Professional ratings
Review scores
Source	Rating
AllMusic	3.5/5 stars
The Guardian	2/5 stars

Stand Still is the debut studio album by Scottish female singer-songwriter Emma Gillespie, recorded under the moniker Emma's Imagination, released in 2011.

== Background and recording ==
Gillespie competed and won the TV talent contest Must Be the Music, aired on Sky 1 in August and September 2010. Unlike other TV talent contests, this show put an emphasis on giving the acts control over their careers. Additionally, every song performed on the show was available to download from iTunes and Sky Songs with 100 per cent of the net profits of the songs and merchandise going to the musicians. As the winner of the show on 19 September 2010, Emma's Imagination received a £100,000 cash fund rather than a record contract. Emma's Imagination performed two songs on the show, "This Day" on the semi-final and "Focus" on the final at the Wembley Arena.

Emma's Imagination quickly signed with Future Records, a label created by Gary Barlow, becoming only the third act signed to the label after Camilla Kerslake and Aggro Santos, and recorded the album with producer Martin Terefe in Kensal Town Studios in North London over a period of four weeks.

Gillespie spoke about the recording process: "It was done so we had enough time for it not to be a rush, but brisk enough so we couldn’t overthink anything. I had a lot of the arrangements in my head and of course all the songs were written, so it was mainly about fleshing out the skeletons. It’s not a pop album as such, but it’s not folk. I think it fits perfectly in the middle. There’s a thread that runs through the album that I think people will really like and the songs are diverse too without sounding like they don’t belong together."

The 10-track album features 8 original songs, among them re-recorded versions of the two songs she performed on Must Be the Music, "This Day" and "Focus", and two covers: the Academy Award-winning song "Falling Slowly", originally from the film Once, and "Drive", originally by Bic Runga.

== Release and reception ==
Released in January 2011, the album received mixed reviews from critics. While complimenting Gillespie's voice, most of the criticism went to Terefe's production, with The Guardian awarding it 2/5 stars, stating: "Producer Martin "KT Tunstall" Terefe has filled out the songs with anodyne strings and mid-tempo pop-rock arrangements; the creeping, trip-hoppish Puddy Muddle stands out as one of the only items of interest." Similarly the BBC review declared: "Gillespie has a decent voice and her songs are sincere if soppy. Producer Martin Terefe, who’s steered James Morrison, K.T. Tunstall and Jason Mraz to success, has dressed her trilling and strumming lightly, with soporific, innocuous, featureless arrangements and "tasteful" strings."

Jon O'Brien from Allmusic gave the album a more favourable review, awarding it 3.5/5 stars. It complimented Gillespie's voice and original songs, but criticised the re-recorded "This Day" losing the simplicity of the original version, and her choice of covers, stating "Considering her success was built on her ability to write her own songs, it's disappointing that Stand Still also contains two rather pointless cover versions. They might not be the unimaginative "Unchained Melody"-style karaoke standards dumped on most X-Factor winners, but renditions of Bic Runga's "Drive" and Glen Hansard and Marketa Irglova's Oscar-winning duet "Falling Slowly," as respectful and competently performed as they are, offer nothing new on the originals."

The album peaked at #14 in the UK and spent 3 weeks on the chart. This was Emma's Imagination's only album with the label, as Gary Barlow closed down Future Records in 2012, and Gillespie continued to record as an independent artist.

== Single releases ==
"This Day" and "Focus" were released as singles during the time of her competing on the talent show, in acoustic guitar versions. These peaked at #10 and #7 in the UK singles chart, respectively.

In November 2010, "Faerie Lights" was released as a promotional free download single on download sites as a teaser for the album.

The first proper lead single for the album was the re-recorded "This Day", released a week prior to the album, and the final single was "Brighter Greener", released in March 2011.

== Track listing ==
All tracks composed by Emma Gillespie; except where indicated

1. "This Day" (3:11)
2. "Soul of Oceans" (3:30)
3. "Brighter Greener" (3:14)
4. "Drive" (Bic Runga) (3:26)
5. "Focus" (3:21)
6. "Puddy Muddle" (3:39)
7. "Faerie Lights" (3:18)
8. "Daisy Train" (2:39)
9. "Falling Slowly" (Glen Hansard, Markéta Irglová) (3:18)
10. "Keep" (3:41)

The digital versions of the album also feature an interview with Emma's Imagination as a bonus track.

== Charts ==
Chart (2011)	Peak position
UK Albums Chart	14
