= This Day (song) =

2018 song by Emma's Imagination

Single by Emma's Imagination

from the album Stand Still
- B-side: "You Know I'm No Good"
- Released: 5 September 2010 (original); 3 January 2011 (re-recorded version)
- Recorded: 2010
- Genre: Pop, Folk
- Length: 1:51 (original); 3:11 (re-recorded version)
- Label: Future
- Songwriter: Emma Gillespie
- Producer: Martin Terefe

Emma's Imagination singles chronology
"Stamp Your Feet" (2009)	"This Day" (2010)	"Focus" (2010)

"This Day" is a song performed by Scottish singer Emma's Imagination (an alias for Emma Gillespie), from her debut album Stand Still.

== Details ==
The song, written by Gillespie, was first widely heard when she competed on the TV talent contest Must Be the Music from TV Channel Sky One, singing it on the second semi-final. Accompanied only by an acoustic guitar, Gillespie made it through the final stage of the contest, eventually winning it. Judge Sharleen Spiteri commented after her performance that she "honestly think you've written yourself a hit record." This acoustic version of the song was put on sale after the TV broadcast on iTunes and Sky Songs, with all the profits off the sales going directly to the artists.

Speaking about the song, Gillespie has said that "I wrote it whilst sitting in Glasgow Green on a really lovely sunny day. The song is about that feeling that you get when you're sitting in the sun and everything just seems alive and beautiful, almost like that day was made especially for you."

== Re-recorded version ==
After winning the talent show, Gillespie was approached by several labels, eventually signing with Gary Barlow's Future Records, and recorded the album with producer Martin Terefe. As such, Gillespie cut a new version of the song for the album, adding fuller instrumentation with prominent drum and bass lines. Also notable is the addition of a string section throughout the song. While Gillespie said the new version may alienate some fans of the simpler acoustic version, she oversaw the process of how she wanted it to be recorded and personally liked the new take. This re-recorded version was selected as the album's lead single in January 2011.

== Music video ==
A video was produced for the re-recorded version, directed by Vanessa Caswill. It shows Emma resting still on several landscapes, like grass, floorboards and bedsheets, while several objects pass beside or circling her, like a spider, dishes with sweets, fruits, roads with miniature cars or Emma's own acoustic guitar and shoes. Filmed with a green screen, Gillespie said afterwards she did not enjoy the experience much: "I had to lie on the floor from eight in the morning till 11 at night. All my muscles were spasming. It was horrible."

== Release and reception ==
The original acoustic version of "This Day" was released the same night she performed it on Must Be the Music, and quickly escalated the UK charts. It eventually entered and peaked at #10 in the UK charts, becoming Emma's first top 10 hit. It also peaked at #9 in Ireland and at #7 in the Scottish Charts, and at #2 on the UK Indie Chart.

The re-recorded version, which drew some criticism for eliminating the simplicity of the song, substituting it with "anodyne strings" and "innocuous, featureless arrangements". The single, which had an acoustic cover of Amy Winehouse's "You Know I'm No Good" as the b-side, only managed to chart at #187.

== Track listing ==
Original single (2010)

1. "This Day (1:51)

Re-recorded version (2011)

1. "This Day" (3:11)
2. "You Know I'm No Good" (3:41)

== Charts ==
Chart (2010)	Peak position
Irish Singles Chart	9
Scottish Singles Chart	7
UK Singles Chart	10
UK Indie Chart	2
