= Cavatina (Myers) =

1970 classical guitar piece by Stanley Myers

"Cavatina" is a 1970 classical guitar piece by British composer Stanley Myers based on music he originally wrote for the soundtrack of the film The Walking Stick (1970). After Myers expanded the piece and it was recorded by guitarist John Williams, "Cavatina" was popularized as the theme from the 1978 film The Deer Hunter.

The beginning of the piece takes up the first bars of the accompaniment to Mozart's Laudate Dominum from the Solemn Vespers for a Confessor (K. 339), in a different key: E major instead of F major.

The Italian musical term cavatina is frequently applied to any simple, melodious air.

== History ==
The full version of the composition was first recorded by classical guitarist John Williams at Olympic Sound Studios in London in a session eventually released on Williams' 1971 album Changes. Williams' explained the origins of the arrangement he recorded to Soundtrack magazine in 2002. Williams said the idea for the expanded arrangement sprang from Myers' impromptu performance of the main theme on piano in a London restaurant where Williams and Myers were having dinner:

We were sitting in a wonderful Italian restaurant off the Fulham Road in London, and they had a piano bar downstairs, and Stanley went and played those bars from The Walking Stick, but just the opening eight or sixteen bars, which is what was used in The Walking Stick. I hadn’t played [on the recording of the Walking Stick soundtrack music]—a London session guitarist had played it. But I immediately said, "Stanley that is fantastic. You must expand that into a proper, full, instrumental piece." And then, about four or five years later, Michael Cimino had been given that record, Changes, by his production assistant. That’s where he heard "Cavatina", and then used it for The Deer Hunter.

In 1973, Cleo Laine wrote lyrics to "Cavatina" and recorded her version under the title "He Was Beautiful". Laine was accompanied by Williams on her recording, which was included on their joint album, Best Friends, and also featured in a televised concert in honour of Queen Elizabeth II's Silver Jubilee.

After the release of The Deer Hunter in 1978, Williams' instrumental version became a UK Top 20 hit in 1979. Two other versions also made the Top 20 in the same year: another instrumental recording by The Shadows, with an electric guitar played by Hank Marvin, released on their album String of Hits with the name "Theme from 'The Deer Hunter' (Cavatina)" (number 9 in the UK singles charts and number 1 in The Netherlands"Dutch Top 40". 2025.); and a vocal version (using Cleo Laine's lyrics) by Iris Williams.

== Later recordings ==
Guitarist Göran Söllscher plays John Williams' solo guitar arrangement of Cavatina on the first track of his album 1981 (Deutsche Grammophon - 2531 365).

In 1982, guitarist Liona Boyd included it in her "Best Of" Collection, also with arrangement alongside Eric Robertson and Williams.

Angel Romero recorded a version of "Cavatina" on his 1988 Telarc release A Touch of Class.

Cantabile - the London Quartet recorded a Neil Richardson arrangement with Brass Quintet accompaniment of "She Was Beautiful" for their 1992 album "A Tribute to Hollywood"

Norbert Kraft included a version of "Cavatina" on his 1996 Naxos Records release "Guitar Favourites".

Gene Bertoncini recorded a solo guitar arrangement of the piece on his 1999 album Body and Soul ( Ambient Records).

The piece was recorded in 2004 by trumpeter and flugelhorn player Vaughn Nark on his album Panorama: Trumpet Prism for Summit Records, featuring Nark on flugelhorn and Rick Whitehead on classical guitar.

The piece was recorded in 2006 by classical guitarist Xuefei Yang for her album, Romance de Amor.

The piece was recorded by Paul Potts on his 2007 debut album, One Chance.

There is a gospel version set to "Cavatina" called "Beautiful"; the author is Billy Evmur and it appears in the Dove on a Distant Oak Tree collection. Another vocal version with different lyrics was recorded by Vince Hill (released on the compilation The Ember Records Story Vol. 2 – 1960–1979).

In 2009, the song was the tenth track of Camilla Kerslake's début album Camilla Kerslake.

In 2011, the song was recorded by singer Joe McElderry and guitarist Miloš Karadaglić for McElderry's second album, Classic.

A full version of Cavatina for solo guitar and symphony orchestra was broadcast by the Faroese Broadcasting Company in 2013. Featuring guitarist Ólavur Jakobsen and Faroe Island Symphony Orchestra.

In 2013, the song was recorded by Mark Vincent for his album Songs from the Heart.

In 2016, the song was recorded and released by Japanese guitarist Kaori Muraji on her Decca Records album Rhapsody Japan.

Guitarist Karin Schaupp and baritone Teddy Tahu Rhodes recorded "She Was Beautiful" for the ABC Classics album I'll Walk Beside You (2018).

== Other usage ==
Williams played the piece for the Amnesty International benefit concert, film and soundtrack The Secret Policeman's Ball in 1979.

The piece is played at the end of the Battlestar Galactica episode "Scar" after Kara "Starbuck" Thrace toasts the memory of pilots who had been tragically killed doing what they loved. See also Music of Battlestar Galactica (2004 TV series) § Music not original to Battlestar Galactica.

"Cavatina" was used to accompany "The Gallery" in the BBC children's programme Take Hart, and its predecessor Vision On, during the 1970s. It was also used for some time in the 1970s as the closedown music when BBC Radio ceased transmission at 2 a.m.

The song was featured in the 2005 film Jarhead.

The song has become a trademark piece of buskers, despite its relative difficulty.
