= List of Almost Never episodes =

Almost Never is a British musical drama series that premiered on CBBC on 15 January 2019. The series details the experiences of two fictional bands; The Wonderland and Girls Here First. Almost Never stars Nathaniel Dass, Harry Still, Oakley Orchard, Mya-Lecia Naylor, Miriam Nyarko, Lola Moxom, Lilly Stanion, Kimberly Wyatt, Tillie Amartey, Tyra Richardson and Aston Merrygold.

== Series overview ==
Series	Episodes	Originally released	
Series	Episodes	First released	Last released
1	13	15 January 2019	
2	13	29 October 2019	31 December 2019
3	10	14 July 2021	

== Episodes ==
=== Series 1 (2019) ===
No. overall	No. in series	Title	Directed by	Written by	Original release date
1	1	"The Spotlight"	Ben Kellett	Paul Rose	15 January 2019
After placing as runner-ups in popular music competition The Spotlight to girl group Girls Here First, the Wonderland are dropped by their manager, Sasha. Nate's sister Molly sells his belongings to fans of The Wonderland at school, but is asked to refund purchases when people become more interested in Girls Here First. Nate's mother, Anika, asks him to stop performing and to focus on schoolwork, but he convinces her that he should he allowed to perform. Featured song: "Stitches"
2	2	"The Concert"	Ben Kellett	Paul Rose	15 January 2019
For her birthday, Molly wants to see Girls Here First in concert. Anika says no, so she asks Nate to take her. While at the concert, someone films Nate singing along to their song. Oakley begins texting Mya and asks Harry for advice on how to approach things. He later meets her after a Girls Here First gig. Featured song: "Moves Like Jagger"
3	3	"The Single"	Ben Kellett	Paul Rose	15 January 2019
When the video of Nate singing along at the Girls Here First concert goes viral, Molly asks Chloe what her plan is as their social media manager. They visit Sasha but fail at convincing her to remove the video. AJ informs the Wonderland that he has booked a gig for them, but they are shocked when they have to help a talentless girl sing. Featured song: "Youngblood"
4	4	"The Photo"	Ben Kellett	Joe Williams	15 January 2019
The Wonderland learn that when people search for them online, the photo of them placing second on The Spotlight is what surfaces first on the search results. They arrange for a professional photo to be taken to replace it. Oakley and Mya go on their first date. Featured song: "Ho Hey"
5	5	"The Squid"	Ben Kellett	Joe Williams	15 January 2019
Sasha lends Dan money in order to keep the Palais open, in return for Sasha having part ownership of the diner. Fleur East visits the Palais and the Wonderland attempt to impress her with a song. Mya realises that life in a girl group is not what she expected. Featured song: "Don't Be So Hard on Yourself"
6	6	"The Middle Eight"	Ben Kellett	Chris Reddy	15 January 2019
Harry receives advice from a girl claiming to be an alternative singer and tries to amend the image of the Wonderland to impress her. Nate and Oakley disagree with the changes Harry wants to make. Harry is shocked to learn that the girl is a liar when he finds her performing as a children's entertainer. Featured song: "Perfect Strangers"
7	7	"The Live Lounge"	Jack Casey	Madeleine Brettingham	15 January 2019
Chloe introduce the band to Toby, a vlogger with a million subscribers. When they ask to be featured on his channel, Toby tries to make them perform an embarrassing routine, to which they refuse. When a video of Lilly singing with a sore throat goes viral, Sasha tries to persuade Dev to feature Girls Here First on the Live Lounge, but when Lilly's throat does not improve, their slot is given to the Wonderland. Featured song: "I Know You"
8	8	"The Birthday"	Jack Casey	Joe Williams	15 January 2019
In order to reach number one on the charts, Chloe arranges for a music video to be filmed and posted. Dan agrees to let the Wonderland film it at the Palais, but when Sasha uses the diner for Coleen's birthday party, they are left with no location to film in. Dan sneaks the band in as performers and the performance is livestreamed. Sasha tells Girls Here First that if they impress Coleen with an acoustic birthday performance, they will be allowed to venture onto a European tour. As Coleen is impressed, she greenlights the tour. Featured song: "Superheroes"
9	9	"The Chicken"	Jack Casey	Toby Davies	15 January 2019
For good performance at school, Harry is given temporary ownership of the school mascot, a cockerel. He loses it but Oakley helps him to find it. Chloe arranges for the Wonderland to be interviewed by various online magazines in order to make people understand their personality. Nate and Chloe panic over the thought of going on a date with each other. Featured song: "Burn"
10	10	"The Ice Cream"	Ben Kellett	Chris Reddy	15 January 2019
When ex-pop star Frankie begins working at the Palais, Nate helps him to work his way back into the industry. However, he is shocked when Frankie turns down a singing gig in order to do his A Levels. Oakley is jealous when Mya is part of a fake relationship arranged by Sasha to elevate her career. Featured song: "Riptide"
11	11	"The Boxing"	Jack Casey	Paul Rose	15 January 2019
Girls Here First are given a rare week off and Sasha tells them to keep a low profile. Chloe suggests that Dan should hold a boxing match at the Palais in order to pay Sasha back for the loan. Chloe and Mya sign up and are put in a match with each other. Nate faints at the boxing match. Elena encourages Molly to get her ears pierced, which her mother forbid her from doing. When her mother eventually says yes, she backs out due to fear. Featured song: "Best Fake Smile"
12	12	"The Lost Guitar"	Jack Casey	Paul Rose	15 January 2019
Chloe arranges for the Wonderland to perform at the Palais for a livestream. Nate asks a musician at the restaurant to tune his guitar, who accidentally takes it and leaves hers behind. When the musician is revealed to be a client of Sasha's, AJ sneaks backstage at her performance to reclaim the guitar, which he fails at achieving. Sasha asks Girls Here First to perform trust exercises and to be open about any secrets. The girls push Mya to come forward about her relationship with Oakley, but she persuades them to back her by sharing their secrets together. Featured song: "Best Fake Smile"
13	13	"The Prom"	Jack Casey	Paul Rose	15 January 2019
With the Wonderland booked for a performance at the school prom, Harry is pessimistic about the future of the band. Sasha learns of their gig, and reports the school for not having a live music licence, getting the prom cancelled. Chloe ponders whether her and Nate are more than friends, but when Nate insists that they are only friends, she quits as their social media manager. Girls Here First leave for their European tour and find that Oakley has smuggled himself on to the tour bus. Dan informs the Wonderland that they can hold the prom at the Palais, where the band perform. Coleen arrives and reveals that she may sign the band. Featured songs: "Don't Be So Hard on Yourself" and "Almost Never Did"

=== Series 2 (2019) ===
No. overall	No. in series	Title	Directed by	Written by	Original release date
14	1	"Hot Wings"	Jack Casey	Paul Rose	29 October 2019
Sasha, now pregnant, has a meeting with Girls Here First where they discuss the future of the group, with Mya having left the group during the European tour. When Fabio informs Sasha that Coleen wants to sign the Wonderland, Sasha insists that she will make Girls Here First more successful than them. Nate and Chloe try to be open about their feelings with each other, but are interrupted by Elena who wants to protect the future of the Wonderland. Harry and Oakley compete in a hot wings eating challenge at hosted by Dan at the Palais when Coleen arrives for a meeting with the band. She informs them that their next performance will influence her decision on whether or not she will sign them. The band perform and Coleen tells them that she will be in touch. Featured song: "Only One"
15	2	"The Stadium Show"	Jack Casey	Paul Rose	29 October 2019
The Wonderland receive a management contract from Coleen and AJ asks to be given a second chance as their manager. Chloe is confused at why they kept him, but realises that she too could be replaced by a professional. Chloe decides to manage a new duo composed of performers Luke and Cooper. When AJ ruins the Wonderland's gig by messing with the soundboard, he tells them to sign Coleen's contract. Harry struggles with his crush on newly hired waitress Tyra and tries to downplay his feelings. Featured songs: "Don't Call Me Up" and "Almost Never Did"
16	3	"Managers"	Jack Casey	Paul Rose	29 October 2019
Coleen gives the Wonderland a list of managers to meet with, and they meet Ivan, a potential manager, at a fancy restaurant. He does not want to manage them and leaves the restaurant, leaving the band and AJ with the expensive bill. They agree to work the bill off by washing dishes, but are thrown out when they break several dishes. They eventually pick candidate Jordan as their manager, who allows Chloe to continue working as their social media manager. Sasha is unhappy with the low sales of Girls Here First's latest single. She meets with a journalist to inform him that the sales of their next single will be donated to a charity, but the journalist instead writes about Sasha's controlling ways as a manager. Featured songs: "Lullaby"
17	4	"Do the Fandango"	Jack Casey	Joe Williams	29 October 2019
Jordan suggests giving fans questionnaires to understand what they want from the band. Sasha instructs Fabio to switch their questionnaires with fake copies, which say that they want the Wonderland to dance and wear costumes on stage. Jordan finds the real results and tries to inform the band not to dance due to them performing in front of record label executives. However, they dance and the executives leave. Jordan tells Meg and Anika to acquire merchandise for the band, but when they refuse to pay the printers prices, they are forced to make the shirts themselves, which fails. They go back to the printers, but since they are late, the shirts are printed incorrectly. Featured song: "Almost Never Did (Acoustic)"
18	5	"The Mall"	Jack Casey	Joe Williams	29 October 2019
Jordan books the Wonderland a gig at a local shopping centre, but they show up at the wrong centre when they take the wrong path through a field. When they eventually arrive, Chloe livestreams the performance to fans. Girls Here First agree to do a performance at the Palais when a judgemental review vlogger announces that she will be dining there. However, when Miriam thinks she hears bees, which she has a fear of, she is unable to perform. Tyra agrees to perform instead and the vlogger reviews the diner favourably. Featured songs: "Never Really Over", "Love Machine", "Only Come Out at Night" and "Superstar"
19	6	"The Sound of Silence"	Jack Casey	Joe Williams	29 October 2019
AJ hosts a silent disco at the Palais, and arranges for Jordan to DJ. Jordan enlists the help of Fabio, and when Sasha learns of the disco, she takes over Fabio's role so that she can get close to Tyra. Harry confesses his crush for Tyra, who states that she has a boyfriend. Meg and Dan take an upset Harry on a family meal, where a waitress gives him her number. Girls Here First try to get Chloe and Nate together and the pair kiss. When Miriam suggests that Tyra joins the band, Tyra explains that she would be too nervous to sing on stage. Featured songs: "You and Me"
20	7	"The Homecoming – Part One"	Jack Casey	Paul Rose	31 December 2019
When Sasha learns that it has been arranged for the Wonderland to support Girls Here First on tour, she quits. She fires Fabio, and retrieves evidence of wrongdoings that she has collected from years in the industry. Now without a manager, Girls Here First try to persuade Tyra to join the band, but she continues to persist against the idea. Nate and Chloe go on their first date but are interrupted by Elena and other fans wanting to take photos with Nate. Anika receives a letter from Nate and Molly's father and he later arrives at the Palais. Featured songs: "Silent Night" and "We Wish You a Merry Christmas"
21	8	"The Homecoming – Part Two"	Jack Casey	Paul Rose	31 December 2019
Nate struggles to bond with father Dev, who explains that he left the family as he felt he was not ready to be a father. He plans on leaving again, until Dan persuades him to stay. Fabio returns to Sasha's house, and the pair reconcile. Sasha takes him to Ashley, and says that Fabio should be the new manager of Girls Here First. The girls agree to the offer, as long as Fabio apologises to the Wonderland for their actions in the past. Fabio also enlists Tyra to join Girls Here First. Featured songs: "When the Snow Falls"
22	9	"Boy in the Woods"	Akaash Meeda	Paul Rose	31 December 2019
Jordan asks Nate to write new songs for the band to perform, but he struggles due to being content with his life. The band go on a trip to the woods in an attempt to inspire Nate, but they get lost when they go on the wrong trail. Nate eventually comes up with an idea for a song, which Jordan likes. Coleen puts pressure on Fabio to make Girls Here First a success, and when he shouts at them, Tyra insists that he will make a good manager. Featured songs: "Only Come Out at Night" and "I'm Still Waiting"
23	10	"Next Stop the Grannies"	Akaash Meeda	Andy Milligan	31 December 2019
Jordan books the Wonderland interviews to be shown to potential fans in America, and he encourages Nate to say that he is single to appeal to fans. Despite wanting to be public about his relationship with Chloe, he pledges his commitment to the band by saying he is single. Chloe sees the footage of Nate saying he is single and storms out. Featured song: "There's Nothing Holdin' Me Back"
24	11	"Press Conference"	Akaash Meeda	Madeleine Brettingham	31 December 2019
A press conference is arranged for the Girls Here First tour, with the Wonderland joining them on the panel. AJ gets them a van to arrive in which is later towed, so they arrive late. When Meg comes to the realisation that she will have nothing to when Harry and Oakley leave for the tour, she vows to find something that makes her happy. Featured songs: "Still Waiting" and "Never Really Over"
25	12	"The Send Off"	Akaash Meeda	James Cary	31 December 2019
Anika arranges a surprise party for the Wonderland and Girls Here First for before they leave for tour. The groups are nervous for the tour, but insist that it will be fun. Featured songs: "Lullaby" and "I'm In Trouble"
26	13	"Time to Say Goodbye"	Akaash Meeda	Paul Rose	31 December 2019
The groups return from tour with one final festival, and the Wonderland are upset not to be busy with music. In order to raise money to attend the festival, Elena hosts a house tour at Nate's house. After their performance at the festival, Sasha approaches Nate and offers him a three-album record deal. He asks if the Wonderland would be included in the deal, but she confirms that it would be a solo signing, and that she would make him a star. Featured songs: "The Sound", "No One" and "Only One"

=== Series 3 (2021) ===
No. overall	No. in series	Title	Directed by	Written by	Original release date
27	1	"The Intern"	Jack Casey	Paul Rose	14 July 2021
Nate reflects on Sasha's offer to sign him to her label and comes to the conclusion that the band would be fine without him. He goes to consult Harry and Oakley, who suggest attending a survival course before he can tell them. When Nate struggles to complete the course and the brothers help him, he realises that he needs to be in the band. Chloe begins working for Sasha as an intern at her label, with Elena being elected as the Wonderland's social media manager in her place. Girls Here First are dropped by Fabio and argue during rehearsals, with Tyra deciding to quit the group. Featured song: "Friends"
28	2	"Class Act"	Jack Casey	Paul Rose	14 July 2021
The Wonderland book an appearance at a school careers day which Eleanor attends. Harry gets nervous when giving his speech to the crowd, which they mock him for. Elena defends him but upsets the crowd, leading them to throw screwed up paper at the band and Elena. Nate helps Chloe with babysitting Sasha's baby, which helps them to bond after not seeing each other for a while. Girls Here First hold a meeting with Fabio where he agrees to manage them again as a three-piece, after Tyra gives her blessing for them to continue. Featured song: "Sway"
29	3	"A Big Joke"	Jack Casey	Paul Rose	14 July 2021
Lola's mother Helen takes her in for a meeting with Sasha to discuss a potential solo career. Lilly sees the pair there and assumes that Lola wants to leave Girls Here First and makes the decision to cut her from the band. Chloe then encourages Lola sign with Sasha as a soloist and helps her to get a meeting with her. When the Wonderland's social media needs more followers, Oakley repeatedly films himself pranking Harry due to the positive reception they receive online. Harry realises that Oakley is pranking him and orchestrates a prank to make him believe he is getting arrested, which Elena posts online. Featured songs: "I Like You" and "Dancing in the Moonlight"
30	4	"Rap Battle"	Jack Casey	Joe Williams and Sam Williams	14 July 2021
Lola feels pressure from her mother to perform complicated dance routines while singing, which she struggles with. Chloe advises her to make her own decisions, which she takes by not going to her next dance rehearsal. The Wonderland unknowingly sign themselves up for a rap battle, which Jordan tries to get them out of. However, the event organiser forces them to compete. In the battle, Oakley reveals himself as a great rapper. Dan's sister Jess arrives at the Palais when he is understaffed and he allows her to set up a dance class in one of the back rooms. Featured songs: "I Like You" and "Classic"
31	5	"The Break Up Song"	Jack Casey	Jack Casey	14 July 2021
When the Wonderland require a new song by the end of the day for a performance, Oakley offers to write one. He wants a breakup song, so Elena finds several girls for him to go on a date with and then be dumped by so that he can write an accurate song. Oakley asks for Tyra's advice on dating and realises that he likes Tyra romantically, so he writes a romantic song for her. He reveals it is about her and she walks away. Lola wants help with her dance routine, so Chloe sets her up with Jess, who teaches her a dance. However, Jess feels it is not true to Lola, so encourages her to sing her song without a dance. Lola then asks Jess to become her coach, to which Jess accepts. Featured songs: "I Like You" and "Accidentally on Purpose"
32	6	"Spot The Difference"	Jack Casey	Rick Laxton and James Britton	14 July 2021
On the day of a merchandise signing event, Harry wakes up with a spot and refuses to leave his room. The band then see a boy named Parry who looks identical to Harry and ask him to pretend to be him at the event. When at the event, Parry becomes bored with signing photos and begins to act wildly, which loses them followers online. Harry sees his behaviour via an online livestream and arrives to save the day. When Sasha schedules an interview about how she balances motherhood with her career, she instructs Chloe to make her look amazing in front of the camera. However, Sasha begins crying due to the pressure and Chloe jumps to her defence. Featured song: "Cake by the Ocean"
33	7	"Finding John"	Rick Laxton and James Britton	Sami Abusamra	14 July 2021
While busking, Nate is given a business card from a man named John, which states that he is a record label executive. John tells him to text the number on the card about the Wonderland's upcoming gig, but Nate loses the card. The Wonderland, Chloe, Elena and Molly go on several quests in order to find John. When Nate and Chloe get left alone, they discuss their feelings for each other. Nate is dismayed when John reveals he is the executive of a label-making company for vinyl records. Jess overhears Lola state that she would be ready to do auditions and decides to challenge her. She tells Lola that she has an audition with numerous industry professionals and due to the stress of the last minute performance, she sings her song out of tune. Jess then informs her that the audience are her friends from drama school. An online rumour circulates about Lola and Nate dating due to him commenting on her social media about collaborating on a song, which upsets Chloe. Featured songs: "Pressure" and "Happier"
34	8	"Awards Night"	Sami Abusamra	Kat Butterfield and Daniel Audritt	14 July 2021
The Wonderland attend an award ceremony where they are nominated for the Best Unsigned Act award. Nate invites Lola, which furthers Chloe's beliefs that Nate and Lola are dating. He confronts her at the ceremony, where he explains that Lola is merely a friend. Sasha learns that she is presenting the award for Best Unsigned Act, which she fears will humiliate her if the Wonderland win, since she refused to sign them. Despite the winner card reading the Wonderland, she announces that another nominee won the award, which is later corrected. During their acceptance speech, Nate thanks Chloe. After the ceremony, Jordan confronts Sasha, branding her pathetic for her behaviour. Featured song: "This is Sick"
35	9	"Fashion Victims"	Sami Abusamra	Paul Rose	14 July 2021
Tyra hosts a fashion show which is nearly ruined, until Oakley helps to make it a success. Afterwards, Tyra asks him out on a date. Nate asks Harry and Oakley if they want to perform with him at a small festival, but they are too busy. He attends the event with Chloe and gets asked to perform, where he dedicates a love ballad to her. Sasha confronts him after the performance, where she re-offers him a solo deal. Featured song: "For Life"
36	10	"The Deal"	Sami Abusamra	Paul Rose	14 July 2021
Nate does not give Sasha an answer about the solo deal and when he returns to the Palais, he is questioned by Harry, Oakley, Elena and Mollie about his intentions to leave the band. He declines wanting to leave the Wonderland and later visits Sasha to say that he would never sign with her. Lola performs for Sasha, who says that she cannot sign her despite being perfect. Sasha tells Chloe that if she can get Nate to sign a solo deal with her, she will sign Lola too, but they stick together and refuse. Sasha then appears to change her mind and signs both Lola and the Wonderland. However, after they have signed the contract, Jordan reveals that they have given Sasha complete control of the band and their discography. Her first act as their controller is exiling all of the members and replacing them. Featured songs: "Pressure" and "Good Time"
