= Candy (Aggro Santos song) =

2010 single by Aggro Santos

Single by Aggro Santos featuring Kimberly Wyatt

from the album AggroSantos.com
- Released: 2 May 2010
- Genre: Synth-pop; pop rap
- Length: 3:00
- Label: Mercury; Future
- Songwriters: Aggro Santos; Josef Larossi; Andreas Romdhane; Viktoria Hansen
- Producer: Quiz & Larossi

Aggro Santos singles chronology
"Candy" (2010)	"Saint or Sinner" (2010)

Kimberly Wyatt singles chronology
"Candy" (2010)	"Higher" (remix) (2011)

"Candy" is the debut single by Brazilian-born British-based rapper Aggro Santos. The song was produced by Quiz & Larossi and co-written by Aggro Santos, Josef Larossi, Andreas Romdhane, Viktoria Hansen, while also featuring American singer Kimberly Wyatt of The Pussycat Dolls. It was released on 2 May 2010 as the lead single from Santos' debut studio album AggroSantos.com.

The song has been critically appreciated, with reviewers complimenting its chorus and synth-pop beats associated with it. "Candy" peaked at number five on the UK Singles Chart. Outside the United Kingdom, "Candy" peaked within the top ten of the charts in Poland and the top 20 of the charts in Latvia and the Republic of Ireland. The music video of the song portrayed Santos and Wyatt having a UV water fight in a club.

== Background and composition ==
In an interview Wyatt was asked how she collaborated with Aggro Santos. She explained: "I was working in a studio here in London with [producers] Red Rhythm, and they told me about Aggro and his underground following, so I did some research on him and his music and really dug his vibe, and just thought, 'Why not?' I met with Aggro for a writing session and we got along really well. Then a few days later he played me 'Candy' and I thought it sounded like a smash, so when he asked if I'd lay down some vocals for it, of course I said yes."

"Candy" is written by Aggro Santos, Josef Larossi, Andreas Romdhane, Viktoria Hansen. It has elements of David Guetta-esque beats with synth noises. The song's chorus refers to online branding. When Santos was asked what "Candy" means he said, "It means (sings) come and get you some, come and get you some! 'Candy is metaphoric for something that I will not say in this interview!" Amy Dawson from Metro noted that Santos and Wyatt exchange a "romantic repartee".

== Reception ==
=== Critical reception ===
Robert Copsey from Digital Spy gave the song 4 out of five stars stating: "Santos provides many a dodgy lyric ("Girl you look familiar / Where do I know you from? / Have you been to visit me at Aggro Santos dot com?"), but all is forgiven when the track reaches its Kimbo-crooned hook, which provides a satisfying blast of electro fuzz over the throbbing, David Guetta-esque beats." Fraser McAlpine from BBC said that he liked "[...] the funny wobbly synth noises and the grunting in the chorus - is the online branding. 'Aggro Santos dot com' gets a namecheck, as does Facebook, which is the kind of product placement Lady Gaga does in her videos. It's also something we should all get behind if we want the cash-strapped music biz to continue into the century without disappearing in a puff of binary dust. Jon O'Brien from AllMusic praised "Candy" describing it as "gloriously infectious Lady Gaga-esque [song]".

=== Chart performance ===
"Candy" entered and peaked at number five on the UK Singles Chart on 9 May 2010 – for the week ending dated 15 May 2010 – and remained at its peak position for two consecutive weeks. "Candy" was certified silver by the British Phonographic Industry (BPI) for shipment of 200,000 copies of the single. "Candy" made Wyatt the first member of The Pussycat Dolls to chart in Britain as a solo artist.

In the Republic of Ireland, "Candy" entered at number 44 on the Irish Singles Chart on the date of 7 May 2010 – for the week ending dated 13 May 2010 – peaking at number 14 during its sixth week on the chart.

== Music video ==
Kimberly Wyatt and Aggro Santos perform "Candy" during a UV water fight.

The video for the song was directed by Emil Nava and was debuted on 21 September 2010 on VidZone where only PlayStation 3 users could watch in certain territories. The full video release was on the next day when Aggro Santos posted the video on his official YouTube account. The music video was shot on under the London Bridge station where the main plot of the video centered around a UV water fight. About the video the director [Emil Nava] said:

"Having a UV water fight is something I have been thinking about for a while. [...] I have always loved UV and wanted to try something different with it. We shot in a freezing location under the arches in London Bridge. A lot of the extras were fans so were there for free and luckily all were really up for it. It was a pleasure to direct a Pussycat Doll as she was a real pro. Aggro brought his own flavor to it as well, which I feel works really well with her style. All the crew killed it and worked extra hard. I hope you like."

== Track listing ==
Candy EP

1. "Candy" (Radio Edit) - 3:00
2. "Candy" (Crazy Cousin Remix) - 4:05
3. "Candy" (Tweakz Remix) - 3:50

Candy (Ladies Re-Rub)

1. "Candy" (Ladies Re-Rub) - 3:02

== Charts ==
=== Weekly charts ===
Chart (2010)	Peak position
European Hot 100 Singles	20
Ireland (IRMA)	14
Latvia (European Hit Radio)	20
Poland (ZPAV)	5
Scotland Singles (OCC)	4
UK Singles (OCC)	5
UK Singles Downloads (OCC)	4

=== Year-end charts ===
Chart (2010)	Position
UK Singles (OCC)	75

== Certifications ==
Region	Certification	Certified units/sales
United Kingdom (BPI)	Gold	400,000^{‡}
^{‡} Sales+streaming figures based on certification alone.

== Release history ==
List of release dates, record label and format details
Region	Date	Format	Label
Australia	May 2, 2010	Digital download	Mercury Records
Belgium	May 2, 2010	Digital download	Mercury Records
Ireland	May 2, 2010	Digital download	Universal Music
Germany	June 11, 2010	Digital download	Mercury Records
Switzerland	June 11, 2010	Digital download	Mercury Records
Brazil	June 24, 2010	Digital download	Universal Music
