= AggroSantos.com =

Studio album by Aggro Santos
- Released: 31 January 2011
- Recorded: 2009–2010
- Genres: Dance; hip hop; R&B
- Length: 29:42
- Label: Mercury Records

Singles from Aggro Santos.com
- 1. "Candy" Released: 3 May 2010; 2. "Saint or Sinner" Released: 22 August 2010; 3. "Like U Like" Released: 17 January 2011

AggroSantos.com is the only studio album by Brazilian-British rapper Aggro Santos. It was released on 31 January 2011.

== Critical reception ==
Jon O'Brien from Allmusic gave the album three out of five stars and said "Santos will be able to adapt once his ubiquitous sound is considered passé, as an immediate snapshot of the 2011 musical climate, it's still a stylish and energetic debut." Metro Amy Dawson from commented, "Credibility be damned, reach for your glowstick and enjoy some uncomplicated party music."

Professional ratings
Review scores
Source	Rating
Allmusic	3/5 stars
Metro	3/5 stars
OK!	3/5 stars
Star	3/5 stars

== Singles ==
- "Candy" (featuring Kimberly Wyatt) was released as the album's lead single. The song has been critically appreciated, with reviewers complimenting its chorus and synthpop beats associated with it. The song achieved commercial success peaking at number five in the United Kingdom and number fourteen in the Republic of Ireland.
- "Saint or Sinner" was released as the second single from the album. It received minor success than its predecessor charting only in the UK at number nineteen. The song has an old school garage feel associated with Portuguese and Spanish beats.
- "Like U Like" a collaboration with Girls Aloud member Kimberley Walsh, gave Santos his second top ten single in the United Kingdom peaking at number eight and 13 at Ireland.

== Track listing ==
Standard
No.	Title	Writer(s)	Producer(s)	Length
1.	"Candy" (featuring Kimberly Wyatt)	Andreas Romdhane, Josef Larossi, Viktoria Hansen, Santos	Quiz & Larossi	3:00
2.	"Stamina" (featuring Bryn Christopher)	Santos, MacKichan	Blair MacKichan	3:42
3.	"Saint or Sinner"	Reid, Hansen, Santos	Luke Reid aka Flukes of Crazy Cousinz	3:03
4.	"Do You Believe" (featuring Esmée Denters)	Romdhane, Larossi, Hansen, Santos	Quiz & Larossi	3:28
5.	"Everybody in the Club"	Santos, Maplanka, Mhonders, Lunch, Hawes	Boogie "The Poster Boy" & Z1	3:31
6.	"Like U Like" (featuring Kimberley Walsh)	Mac, Hector, Santos	Steve Mac	3:26
7.	"Just Like You"	Williams, Santos, Blackmore	K-Warren	3:21
8.	"Anaconda"	Santos, Ray Hedges, Blackmore, Nigel Butler, Joe (90) Lawrence, Dreelan	Hedges, Butler	3:02
9.	"Rhythm n Flow" (Radio Edit)	Big Shot, Santos	Big Shot	3:09
Total length:				29:42

iTunes Bonus Tracks
No.	Title	Length
10.	"Stamina" (Making of the video)	4:25
11.	"Candy" (Music video)	3:01
12.	"Saint or Sinner" (Music video)	3:12
13.	"Like U Like" (Music video)	3:35
14.	"I'm a Celebrity...Get Me Out of Here!" (Bonus video)	8:49

A physical copy of the album allows access to exclusive content which includes videos for "Candy", "Stamina", "Saint or Sinner", "Like U Like" and "Rhythm N Flow" with behind the scenes features.

== Charts ==
The album performed poorly in the UK and Ireland, where the album failed to chart. In the UK it made number 155 and number 24 on the specialist UK R&B Chart.

Chart (2011)	Peak position
UK R&B Chart	24
UK Album Chart	155

== Release history ==
List of release dates, record label and format details
Region	Date	Format	Label
United Kingdom	31 January 2011	CD, digital download	Mercury Records
Ireland	31 January 2011	CD, digital download	Universal Music
