= List of songs featured on Almost Never =

Songs featured in Almost Never

Almost Never is a British musical drama series that premiered on CBBC on 15 January 2019. The series details the experiences of two fictional bands, the Wonderland and Girls Here First, following their appearance on the fictional music competition series The Spotlight. Almost Never stars Nathaniel Dass, Harry Still, Oakley Orchard, Mya-Lecia Naylor, Miriam Nyarko, Lola Moxom, Lilly Stanion, Kimberly Wyatt, Tillie Amartey, Tyra Richardson and Aston Merrygold. The series features numerous songs in each episode, with both cover versions of popular songs and original music written by cast and crew members of the series.

== Soundtrack albums ==
Title	Details	Ref.
Almost Never	Released: 18 January 2019; Format: Digital download, streaming	
Almost Never 2	Released: 3 January 2020; Format: Digital download, streaming	
Almost Never 3	Released: 9 July 2021; Format: Digital download, streaming	

== Songs ==
Name of song, performer(s), originating performer(s), songwriter(s) and series
Song	Performer(s)	Original performer(s)	Songwriter(s)	Series	Ref.
"Accidentally on Purpose"	The Wonderland	Original song	Calle Lehmann; Nevin Sastry; Ruxley	3	
"Almost Never Did"	The Wonderland	Original song	Savan Kotecha; Carl Fark; Kristian Lundin	1	
"Almost Never Did (Acoustic)"	The Wonderland	Original song	Savan Kotecha; Carl Fark; Kristian Lundin	2	
"Best Fake Smile"	The Wonderland	James Bay	Iain Archer; James Bay	1	
"Boogie Wonderland"	Girls Here First	Earth, Wind & Fire	Allee Willis; Jon Lind	1	
"Burn"	The Wonderland	Ellie Goulding	Ryan Tedder; Ellie Goulding; Greg Kurstin; Noel Zancanella; Brent Kutzle	1	
"Cake by the Ocean"	The Wonderland	DNCE	Joseph Jonas; Justin Tranter; Mattias Larsson; Robin Fredriksson	3	
"Classic"	The Wonderland	Original song	Anthony Watts; Daniel Silberstein; Nevin Sastry	3	
"Dancing in the Moonlight"	The Wonderland	King Harvest	Sherman Kelly	3	
"Don't Be So Hard on Yourself"	The Wonderland	Jess Glynne	Tom Barnes; Jessica Glynne; Wayne Hector; Peter Kelleher; Ben Kohn	1	
"Don't Call Me Up"	The Wonderland	Mabel	Mabel McVey; Camille Purcell; Steve Mac	2	
"Friends"	The Wonderland	Justin Bieber and BloodPop	Justin Bieber; Michael Tucker; Justin Tranter; Julia Michaels	3	
"For Life"	Nathaniel Dass	Original song	Harry Still; Nathaniel Dass; Oakley Orchard	3	
"Good Time"	Girls Here First; The Wonderland	Original song	Oakley Orchard	3	
"Happier"	The Wonderland	Marshmello and Bastille	Christopher Comstock; Dan Smith; Steve Mac	3	
"Ho Hey"	The Wonderland	The Lumineers	Wesley Schultz; Jeremy Fraites	1	
"I Know You"	The Wonderland	Craig David	Craig David; Dan Smith; Fraser Thorneycroft-Smith; Helen "Carmen Reece" Culver	1	
"I'm In Trouble"	Girls Here First	Original song	411 Music Group	2	
"I Like You"	Lola Moxom	Original song	Lola Moxom; Shaun Barrett	3	
"Love Machine"	Emily Atack	Girls Aloud	Miranda Cooper; Brian Higgins; Tim Powell; Nick Coler; Lisa Cowling; Myra Boyle; Shawn Lee	2	
"Lullaby"	The Wonderland	Sigala and Paloma Faith	Bruce Fielder; Jessica Glynne; Janée Bennett; Andrew Bullimore; Paloma Faith; Joshua Record	2	
"Moves like Jagger"	The Wonderland	Maroon 5	Adam Levine; Benny Blanco; Ammar Malik; Shellback	1	
"Never Really Over"	The Wonderland	Katy Perry	Katy Perry; Gino Barletta; Hayley Warner; Anton Zaslavski; Leah Haywood; Daniel James; Dagny Norvoll Sandvik; Michelle Buzz; Jason Gill	2	
"No One"	The Wonderland	Jess Glynne	Janée Bennett; Jessica Glynne; Tobias Gad	2	
"Only Comes Out at Night"	Girls Here First	Original song	Ethan Roberts; Lauren Dyson	2	
"Only One"	The Wonderland	Original song	Anthony Pavel; Daniel Silberstein; Nevin Sastry	2	
"Perfect Strangers"	The Wonderland	Jonas Blue featuring JP Cooper	Guy James Robin; John Paul Cooper; Alex Smith	1	
"Pressure"	Lola Moxom	Original song	Lola Moxom; Rob Kelly	3	
"Riptide"	The Wonderland	Vance Joy	James Keogh	1	
"The Sound"	The Wonderland	The 1975	George Daniel; Matty Healy; Adam Hann; Ross MacDonald	2	
"Stitches"	The Wonderland	Shawn Mendes	Danny Parker; Teddy Geiger	1	
"Still Waiting"	The Wonderland	Original song	Anthony Pavel; Daniel Silverstein; Nevin Sastry	2	
"Superheroes"	The Wonderland	The Script	Danny O'Donoghue; Mark Sheehan	1	
"Superstar"	The Wonderland	Christine Milton	Remee; Joe Belmaati; Mich Hansen	2	
"Sway"	The Wonderland	Original song	Anthony Watts; Daniel Silberstein; Nevin Sastry	3	
"There's Nothing Holdin' Me Back"	The Wonderland	Shawn Mendes	Shawn Mendes; Teddy Geiger; Geoff Warburton; Scott Harris	2	
"This is Sick"	The Wonderland	Original song	Simon Wilcox; Nevin Sastry	3	
"You and Me Song"	The Wonderland	The Wannadies	Christina Äsa Wiksten; Fredrik Schönfeldt; Gunnar Bror Karlsson; Pär Anders Wiksten; Stefan Rolf Schönfeldt	2	
"Youngblood"	The Wonderland	5 Seconds of Summer	Calum Hood; Ali Tamposi; Andrew Watt; Ashton Irwin; Luke Hemmings; Louis Bell	1	
"When the Snow Falls"	Girls Here First; The Wonderland	Original song	Anthony Pavel; Daniel Silberstein; Nevin Sastry	2	
