= Her Majesty & the Wolves =

Electropop duo

- Origin: London, England
- Genre: Electropop
- Years active: 2010–2014
- Label: Chime Entertainment
- Members: Kimberly Wyatt; Spencer Nezey

Her Majesty & the Wolves was a musical duo formed in 2010 by singer Kimberly Wyatt and DJ/record producer Spencer Nezey. A debut studio album, 111, was released by Britain's Chime Entertainment in July 2011. The duo broke up in 2014.

== History ==
Wyatt and Nezey came together after working on her debut studio album in Los Angeles. She became frustrated when most of its producers focused on "making something that people will listen to now". He wanted to make something "people will listen to in the future", and she agreed.

The duo released "Glaciers" on 27 August 2010 as a free download from its website. On 9 November, it released the official music video for the first mainstream single "Stars in Your Eyes", for sale 10 January 2011. On 11 July 2011 the debut album 111 was released in the UK.

== Musical influences ==
The duo's musical influences include Florence and the Machine, Sia, Empire of the Sun and Ladyhawke.

== Discography ==
=== Studio album ===
- 111 (2011)

=== Singles ===
Year	Song	Chart peak positions		Album
Year	Song	UK	US	Album
2010	"Glaciers"	—	—	111
2011	"Stars in Your Eyes"	—	—	111
2011	"Goodbye, Goodnight"	—	—	111

==== Remixes ====
- "Glaciers" (Ashtrobot remix)
- "Glaciers" (Roksonix remix)
- "Stars in Your Eyes" (Sidney Samson Club Remix)

=== Mixtape ===
- Her Majesty & the Wolves Presents: Spring 2010 Mixtape

=== Music videos ===
Year	Song	Director
2010	"Glaciers"	Jess Holzworth
2010	"Stars in Your Eyes"	Justin Harder
2011	"Goodbye, Goodnight"	Asher Brown
