= Emma's Imagination =

Scottish singer

- Born: Emma Gillespie; Edinburgh, Scotland
- Origin: Dumfries, Scotland
- Genres: Pop, alternative
- Occupation: Singer
- Instruments: Vocals, guitar
- Years active: 2010–present
- Label: Future Records (2010–12)

Emma Gillespie (born in Edinburgh, Scotland), better known by her stage name Emma's Imagination, is a Scottish singer. She came to prominence after winning the Sky 1 TV talent contest Must Be the Music. She was signed to Gary Barlow's music label Future Records. She released her debut solo album, Stand Still in January 2011.

== Early years ==
Emma Gillespie was born in Edinburgh and grew up in Dumfries where she attended St Joseph's College. She lived with her mother Sharon and stepfather. Gillespie was in the Andaman Islands in India at the time of the 2004 Indian Ocean earthquake and tsunami. She then went on to travel in Australia, New Zealand and Thailand, with many of her ideas for music originating while travelling.

Gillespie took up playing guitar when aged 16. Before coming to public attention, she spent time busking on the streets of Glasgow, to which she had moved a year before her breakthrough. She also spent time honing her skills performing in New York. Gillespie released her debut single, "Stamp Your Feet", in September 2009, on independent label Up Next Records, based in Glasgow.

== Music career ==
=== 2010–11: Must Be the Music ===
Emma's Imagination entered Must Be the Music, broadcast on Sky1 and Sky 1 HD. In the initial televised audition phase, as well as the three semi-finals and final, contestants sang in front of the judges, Jamie Cullum, Dizzee Rascal, and Sharleen Spiteri. The auditions took place in early August 2010 with musicians allowed to play their own compositions. The live finals were held at Wembley Arena with a live audience behind the judges. During the finals, the public voted for their favourite act, which was Emma's Imagination.

After appearing on the show, her first single, "This Day", was released for sale by download and debuted at number 10 on the United Kingdom Singles Chart and number 2 on the Indie Chart. The single also charted on the Irish Singles Chart, where it reached number 9 and on the Scottish Singles Chart, where it debuted at number 7.

Emma's Imagination won the final on Sunday 19 September 2010, and received a prize of £100,000.

=== 2011: Stand Still ===
Following victory on the show, Emma's Imagination's second single, "Focus", debuted in the United Kingdom at number 7, her second British Top 10 placing. The single also debuted at number 1 on the Indie Chart, number 8 in Ireland and number 5 in Scotland. Her debut album Stand Still was released in January 2011 and peaked at number 14 in the UK Albums Chart.

In 2012, Gary Barlow announced that he was closing his record label.

=== 2013-present: Independent career ===
In 2013, Emma's Imagination released independently a 6-song EP, Underway, produced by Youth. This would be Emma's last release under the name Emma's Imagination, and she has used her birth name for subsequent releases.

Gillespie released her second full-length album, Pier Siamese, in April 2016.

Emma's singing gained a wider audience when it featured in CBeebies Bedtime Hour series Hushabye Lullabye in 2020.

== Discography ==
=== Albums ===
Year	Album details	Peak chart positions		
Year	Album details	UK	IRL	SCO
2011	Stand Still: Released 10 January 2011; Label: Future; Genre: Pop, Alternative	14	48	2
2016	Pier Siamese: Released 8 April 2016; Label: Self-released; Genre: Pop, Alternative	—	—	—
"—" denotes album that did not chart or was not released

=== EPs ===
Year	Album details	Peak chart positions		
Year	Album details	UK	IRL	SCO
2013	Underway: Released 12 August 2013; Label: Pebble Island Records; Genre: Pop, Alternative	—	—	—
2013	Acoustic: Released 2013; Label: Pebble Island Records; Genre: Pop, Acoustic music	—	—	—
"—" denotes album that did not chart or was not released

=== Singles ===
Year	Single	Chart positions				Album
Year	Single	UK	UK IND	IRL	SCO	Album
2009	"Stamp Your Feet"^{1}	65	15	-	46	N/A
2010	"This Day"	10	2	9	7	Stand Still
2010	"Focus"	7	1	7	5	Stand Still
2011	"Brighter Greener"	-	-	-	-	Stand Still
2016	"Mercury"	-	-	-	-	Pier Siamese
2016	"Your House"	-	-	-	-	Pier Siamese
"—" denotes single that did not chart or was not released

==== Notes ====
- ^{1} "Stamp Your Feet" did not chart when it was first released, it charted in October 2010 at the same time she was announced winner of the Must Be the Music contest.

=== Promotional singles ===
- 2010 – "Faerie Lights"
