= Lonsdale Boys Club =

- Also known as: LBC
- Origin: London, England
- Genres: Dance-punk, post-punk revival, indie rock
- Years active: 2010–present
- Labels: Self-released (since 2012); Future Records (2010-2012)
- Members: Charlie Weaver; Topher Richwhite; Loz Curran

Lonsdale Boys Club (often abbreviated to the initialism 'LBC') are a three-piece rock band from London, England. Their sound has been described as a "fusion of disco funk, rock, soul and a little bit of 90's Britpop". When playing live they are often accompanied by 2 or more session musicians. The band name is derived from the road in West London on which they built their own recording studio together.

== History ==
On 13 July 2011 the band played to a 1000-plus crowd at the Music Week Breakout event at Proud Galleries in Camden. During the performance the band announced that they had signed to Gary Barlow's Future Records imprint through Universal and will be releasing music through Island Records. The band are currently finishing their debut album which is scheduled for release in 2012.

After successful early support slots for Neon Trees, The Kooks, One Night Only and The Ting Tings, LBC went on to pick up many fans when they performed as main support for Olly Murs throughout his 2012 UK arena tour.

The band have also received considerable support from SBTV, having been given their own series of ongoing acoustic collaborations with other artists, dubbed the 'LBC Jam Sessions'. These have seen them work with artists such as Wretch 32, Yasmin, Lowkey and Sway. The band has been announced as a supporting act for Jessie J at the 2012 iTunes Festival.

In April 2012 they released their first single "Light Me Up".

Topher Richwhite is the son of David Richwhite, the New Zealand investment banker. In 2022, Topher was detained in Iran with his spouse.

== Personnel ==
- Charlie Weaver
- Christopher "Topher" Richwhite
- Loz Curran

== Discography ==
Albums

Year	Title
2012	Lonsdale Boys Club

Singles

Year	Title
2012	"Light Me Up"
