= Taking The Next Step =

British reality television series

- Genre: Reality
- Original language: English
- No. of seasons: 2
- No. of episodes: 21

Original release
- Network: CBBC
- Release: 13 June 2016 – 11 December 2017

Taking The Next Step is a British/Irish TV programme on CBBC. It is a competition of young dancers competing for a cameo on The Next Step, a teenage Canadian dance drama. The show is presented by Lindsey Russell and Sam & Mark. The three judges are Kimberly Wyatt, Jonny Labey and Marlon ‘Swoosh’ Wallen.
