= Viktoria Hansen =

- Birth name: Viktoria Siff Emelie Hansen
- Origin: London, England
- Genres: Dance, pop, rock, R&B, hip hop, grime
- Occupation(s): Singer songwriter, recording artist, vocal coach
- Instrument: Vocalist
- Labels: Universal, Polydor, Syco, Sony Music, Epic

Viktoria Hansen, born in Aarhus, Denmark, is an English singer-songwriter, recording artist, and vocal coach. Her professional career started in musical theatre at age 13 in her home town Aarhus, Denmark.

Hansen has written songs for several successful music artists' catalogues, including Aggro Santos, Kimberly Wyatt, Girls Can't Catch, The Saturdays, Lena, Medina, Cover Drive and Twenty Twenty. In 2013, she co-wrote the music for I will pray (Pregherò) performed by Giorgia and Alicia Keys.

== Early years ==
She started in the town of Aarhus, Denmark where she trained as a dancer exploring such diverse genres as Classical Ballet, Latin Dance, and Street Dance before gradually moving into singing and songwriting.

At 13 she started to perform professionally in musical theatre performing lead roles and at 18 started performing her own songs at Open Mic nights around Scandinavia. These intimate gigs with a one-to-one audience became a window to her life and gained her a substantial following.

== Career ==
In 2006, she released her solo album, Lost My Balance, which was critically acclaimed in Scandinavia, and brought her to the attention of record producer Barry Blue who signed her to his company Frontline Music in 2006. To further her abilities for vocal technique, Hansen enrolled at the Complete Vocal Institute in Copenhagen, Denmark in 2007 to study under the vocal coach Catherine Sadolin.

In early 2010, Hansen moved to London, England, and has had a string of releases including songwriting with Gary Barlow, Steve Robson and Harry Sommerdahl.

She has had two major hits in the United Kingdom in 2010. Girls Can't Catch, "Echo" released on Polydor Records in January 2010, which reached number 19 in the UK Singles Chart and "Candy" by Aggro Santos featuring Kimberly Wyatt in May 2010, which reached number 5 in the UK Singles Chart and stayed in the top 40 for 11 weeks. "Candy" has reached over 220,000 download sales earning a BPI silver sales certification award. Her songs have been featured on many major TV shows and "Candy" was featured in the film, Street Dance 3D, which was a UK top box office film grossing over £11,000,000 in eight weeks of release.

Her songs were on the top 3 compilation albums of 2010.
