= Saint or Sinner =

"Saint or Sinner Feat George Pakos"

Single by Aggro Santos

from the album AggroSantos.com
- Released: 22 August 2010
- Length: 3:03
- Label: Mercury Records, Future Records
- Songwriters: Aggro Santos, Luke Reid aka Flukes of Crazy Cousinz and Viktoria Hansen
- Producer: Luke Reid aka Flukes of Crazy Cousinz

Aggro Santos singles chronology
"Candy" (2010)	"Saint or Sinner Feat George Pakos" (2010)	"Like U Like" (2010)

"Saint or Sinner" is the second official single by British rapper Aggro Santos released on 22 August 2010. The single has been taken from Santos' debut album, AggroSantos.com. It reached number 19 on the UK Singles Chart.

== Critical reception ==
Fraser McAlpine of BBC Chart Blog wrote dismissively of the song, saying that Santos was turning into "Pitbull Junior" with the song's shallow focus on girls..

== Music video ==
The music video was shot entirely at a party in London. Santos had a competition on his website with appearance in the video as a prize.

== Chart performance ==
Chart (2010)	Peak position
UK Singles Downloads (OCC)	19
UK Hip Hop/R&B (OCC)	7
UK Singles (OCC)	19

== Release history ==
Region	Format	Date
United Kingdom	Digital download	22 August 2010
