= Iris Williams =

Welsh singer (1946–2025)

Iris Williams OBE
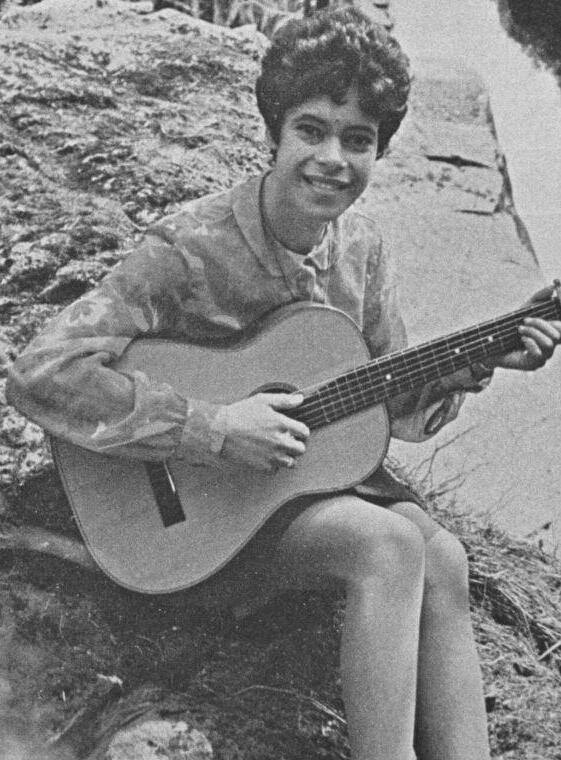
- Williams on a 1968 album cover

Background information
- Born: 20 April 1946; Rhydyfelin, Wales
- Died: 11 July 2025 (aged 79) Rancho Mirage, California, U.S.
- Genres: Middle of the Road
- Occupation: Singer
- Years active: 1971–2025
- Spouse: Clive Pyatt (m. 1982)

Iris Williams (20 April 1946 – 11 July 2025) was a Welsh singer. Williams reached the peak of her popularity during the 1980s.

== Early life and education ==
Williams was born in Rhydyfelin on 20 April 1946, to a Welsh mother and an African-American father. Brought up in a children's home in Tonyrefail and later adopted by the Llewellyn family, she worked in a factory and then won a scholarship to the Royal Welsh College of Music & Drama.

== Career ==
Williams had major success in Wales with "Pererin Wyf" (1971) a Welsh-language version of "Amazing Grace". She also won the Welsh talent contest, Cân i Gymru (A Song for Wales) in 1974 with the song "I gael Cymru'n Gymru Rydd" (For a Free Wales).

In 1979, Williams had a top-20 UK hit with "He Was Beautiful", a song based on the already well-known theme from The Deer Hunter, with lyrics by Cleo Laine. As a result of hitting the national charts, she was given her own BBC series.

In 1991, Williams performed cabaret at the prestigious Oak Room in the Algonquin Hotel in New York City. Other engagements in the United States included five concerts with Bob Hope and an appearance with Rosemary Clooney. Williams also gave several charity performances for President Gerald Ford. She performed several times at the Royal Variety Performance and was one of the stars of the gala concert to celebrate the opening of the National Assembly for Wales in 1999.

== Personal life and death ==
Williams married Clive Pyatt in 1982. The marriage produced one child. In the early 1980s, Williams took ownership of a public house at Winkfield near Ascot in Berkshire named "The Pheasant Plucker", combining running it with appearances on the club circuit, before relocating to New York in the early 1990s.

Williams was appointed Officer of the Order of the British Empire (OBE) in the 2004 New Year Honours for services to music and charitable causes. In 2006, she performed at the Brecon Jazz Festival and was later admitted to the Gorsedd of Bards at the National Eisteddfod of Wales.

Williams died in Rancho Mirage, California, on 11 July 2025, aged 79.
