= Nathaniel Dass =

British actor, singer and musician

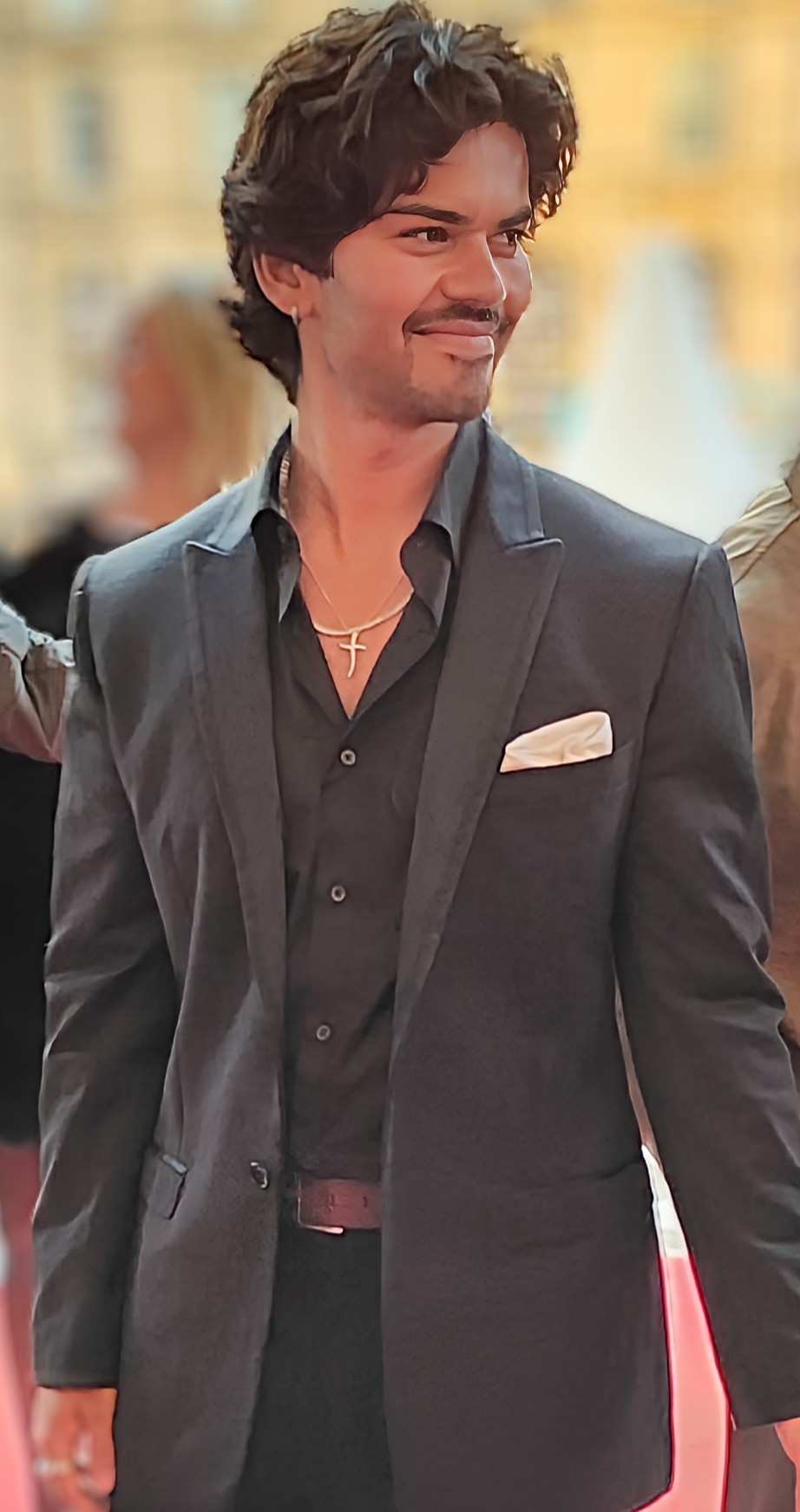
- Dass in 2025
- Occupations: Actor; singer; musician
- Years active: 2016–present
- Agent: Red Door Talent Management
- Television: Almost Never; Hollyoaks

Nathaniel Dass is a British actor, singer and musician. Dass played the main role of Nathaniel/Nate in the CBBC musical dramedy television series Almost Never, which ran for three seasons between 2019 and 2021. From 2023 to 2026, Dass portrayed Dillon Ray in the Channel 4 soap opera Hollyoaks, for which he was nominated for "Best Partnership" at the 2024 Inside Soap Awards.

== Life and career ==
Dass is from Birmingham, West Midlands. He attended King Edward VI Five Ways School, where he gained 10 GCSE subjects at grades A* and A in 2018. In 2016, Dass appeared as a singer in the musical Jesus Christ Superstar. In 2018, it was announced that Dass had been cast as the lead role of Nathaniel/Nate in CBBC's new musical dramedy television series Almost Never. The show revolves around teenagers trying to make it in the music industry after appearing fictional music competition series. Dass performed in several songs that were performed on the show. The first two series of Almost Never originally aired in 2019. In 2021, Dass appeared on Blue Peter. That same year, he starred in the third series of Almost Never.

In April 2023, it was announced that Dass had been cast as 15-year-old Dillon Ray on the Channel 4 soap opera Hollyoaks. He was introduced as the nephew of established character Misbah Maalik (Harvey Virdi), who takes him in when he is kicked out from his mother's home. Virdi explained that she had screen tested with several actors whilst casting Dillon and she felt that Dass had the "right energy". Dass's debut as Dillon aired on 20 April. Dillon's storylines have included becoming friends with other teenagers in the village, coming out to his mother, being involved in long-running conversion therapy storyline with Lucas Hay (Oscar Curtis), and beginning a romantic relationship with Lucas. Lucas and Dillon's relationship gained a fan following. For their roles as Dillon and Lucas, Dass and Curtis were longlisted for "Best Partnership" at the 2024 Inside Soap Awards. In 2025, Curtis and Dass were shortlisted for the British Soap Award for Best On-Screen Partnership. That same year, Dillon was central to an exploitation storyline. Dass was initially very nervous when he heard about the storyline and called it the "heaviest material" he had filmed on the soap, finding it difficult to film at times, but he also felt "privileged" and excited as an actor.

As of 2023, Dass continues to sing and write music and is in a band, No Romance, with fellow Almost Never cast member Oakley Orchard. Dass appeared on Saturday Mash-Up! again with his Hollyoaks co-star Haiesha Mistry. In October 2025, it was also reported that Dass would portray Dillon in the Hollyoaks late-night special Hollyoaks Later for the soap's 30th anniversary, which was broadcast on 22 October of that year.

== Personal life ==
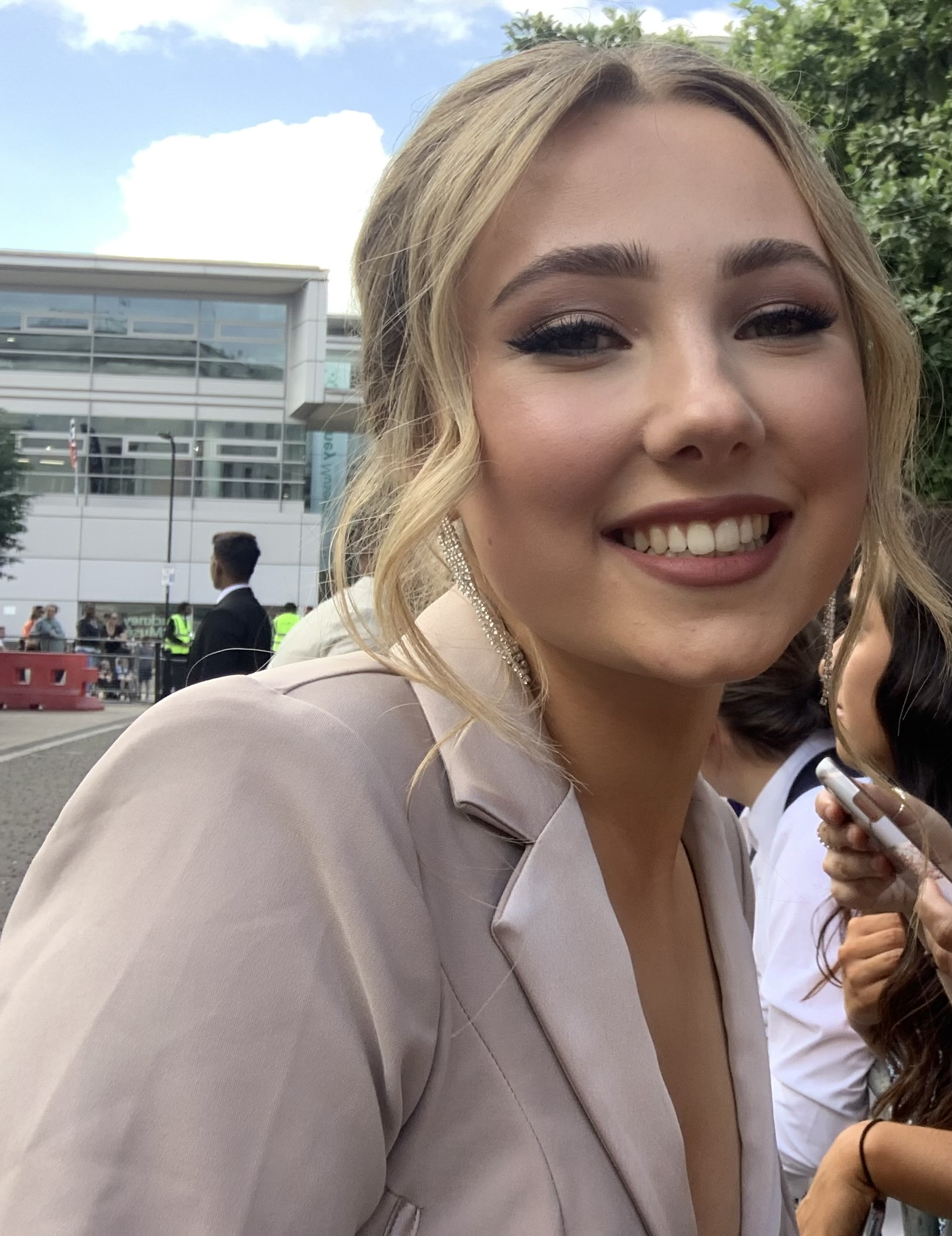
Dass is dating co-star Ruby O'Donell (pictured) as of 2025.

In July 2024, it was reported that Dass was dating his Hollyoaks co-star Ruby O'Donnell. In May 2025, the couple celebrated their one-year anniversary on social media, which received comments of support from their Hollyoaks colleagues and others. Discussing their relationship, Dass and O'Donnell explained that they initially did not speak much during Dass's first year on the show as they did not work together, but they later got to know each other properly outside of work. The pair had a "no kissing on set" rule in order to be professional.

== Filmography ==
Television

Year	Title	Role	Notes	Ref.
2019, 2021	Almost Never	Nathaniel/Nate	Main role	
2019, 2024	Saturday Mash-Up!	Himself	Guest (2 episodes)	
2021	Blue Peter	Himself	Panellist	
2023–2026	Hollyoaks	Dillon Ray	Regular role	
2025	Hollyoaks Later	Dillon Ray	Late night special	

== Awards and nominations ==
List of acting awards and nominations
Year	Award	Category	Title	Result	Ref.
2024	Inside Soap Awards	Best Partnership	Hollyoaks	Shortlisted	
2025	British Soap Awards	Best On-Screen Partnership	Hollyoaks	Shortlisted	
