= Like U Like =

2011 single by Aggro Santos

Single by Aggro Santos featuring Kimberley Walsh

from the album AggroSantos.com
- Released: January 17, 2011
- Genre: Electro-hop; pop rap
- Length: 3:26
- Label: Mercury, Future
- Songwriters: Steve Mac; Wayne Hector; Aggro Santos
- Producer: Steve Mac

Aggro Santos singles chronology
"Saint or Sinner" (2010)	"Like U Like" (2011)

Kimberley Walsh singles chronology
"Like U Like" (2011)	"One Vision" (2012)

"Like U Like" is a song by British recording artist Aggro Santos featuring Girls Aloud member Kimberley Walsh. The song was written by Steve Mac, Wayne Hector, and Aggro Santos and produced by Mac for his first album, AggroSantos.com (2011). After Santos mentioned to Gary Barlow that he was interested in making a duet with Walsh, Barlow contacted her and arranged their duet. Originally, Walsh's part was sung by a male. The song uses synthesiser noises while Walsh's voice was described by reviewers as sultry and monotone.

The song received mixed reviews from critics complimenting the synthesiser noises but criticising Walsh's contribution to the song. An accompanying music video, directed by the Lennox Brothers, shows Santos trying to win Walsh's affections during speed dating. It was noted that Walsh looked like her bandmate Cheryl Cole. The single entered at number eight and thirteen on the UK Singles Chart and Irish Singles Chart, respectively.

== Background and composition ==
In an interview with MTV United Kingdom, Santos said that Walsh replaced a male vocalist on the song. "I think it suits a girl's vocal more. It's more of a softer song and Kimberley did a great job on the vocals." He also said that Gary Barlow had arranged the duet. "I was a big fan of Girls Aloud for years and I mentioned that to Gary Barlow who is a friend of Kim's. I said I would be up for working with her. He spoke to her and she was up for it, so we made 'Like U Like'."

"Like U Like" is a rap-electro song which uses "grinding synths", "techno bleeps" and "catchy hand-claps" with Walsh providing a sultry voice. The song was written by Mac, Hector and Santos. Santos said that "Like U Like" "[is] more pop, bubbly and commercial than my last track, 'Saint or Sinner'".

== Critical reception ==
"Like U Like" received mixed reviews from critics. Robert Copsey from Digital Spy wrote, "[Kimberley Walsh's] sultry tones garnishing 'Like U Like's spicy mix of grinding synths, techno bleeps and catchy hand-claps in oh-so tasty fashion." Leanne Rain of Hive Magazine praised the song. "[The] single has all the ingredients of a pop classic, and possesses one of the biggest pop hooks of the year." Other critics criticised Walsh's appearance. Jon O'Brien from AllMusic said, "[the song] won't exactly threaten Cheryl Cole's status as the band's chief success." He also described "Like U Like" as a "tuneless dirge". Rach Read from Teentoday also commented on Walsh's appearance. "Like U Like is a tacky trashtastic 'club banger' that would have completely slipped under our radar [if it] had it not featured Girls Aloud's most shapely member [...] That's in addition to looking extremely lovely, working some super-sexy moves and contributing some not terribly good vocals." Morwenna Ferrier from The Guardian wrote that Santos raps like he has chips stuffed in his cheeks.

== Music video ==
Walsh and Santos during their speed dating

The music video for "Like U Like" was directed by the Lennox Brothers. The video has Santos adopting a variety of different looks to try to win the affections of Walsh during speed dating.

=== Reception ===
Rach Read from Teentoday described the speed dating as the "worst speed-dating session in the world" because "every other participant seems to be Aggro himself. Get your money back, love!" A reviewer from Sugar said that he loved the video particularly commenting on Kimberley's dance moves.

== Formats and track listings ==
Digital download

1. "Like U Like" (featuring Kimberley Walsh) - 3:25

Like U Like - EP

1. "Like U Like" (featuring Kimberley Walsh) - 3:25
2. "Like U Like" (Digital Dog Remix) - 6:09
3. "Like U Like" (Instrumental) - 3:10
4. Album Preview Mix - 5:23

== Charts ==
Chart (2011)	Peak position
Ireland (IRMA)	13
Scotland Singles (OCC)	7
UK Singles (OCC)	8

== Release history ==
Region	Date	Format	Label
United Kingdom	January 14, 2011	Digital download	Mercury Records
United Kingdom	January 16, 2011	Extended play	Mercury Records
Ireland	January 16, 2011	Digital download	Universal Music
