= Almost Never (TV series) =

British television series

- Genre: Musical; Drama; Comedy
- Created by: Paul Rose; Jeremy Salsby
- Directed by: Ben Kellett; Jack Casey; Akaash Meeda
- Starring: Nathaniel Dass; Harry Still; Oakley Orchard; Kimberly Wyatt; Mya-Lecia Naylor; Miriam Nyarko; Lola Moxom; Lilly Stanion; Tillie Amartey; Aston Merrygold; Tyra Rayne
- Music by: Marcos D'Cruze; Ale Martí
- Country of origin: United Kingdom
- Original language: English
- No. of series: 3
- No. of episodes: 36 (list of episodes)

Production
- Executive producers: Jeremy Salsby; Jed Leventhall
- Cinematography: Steve Lawes
- Editor: Mark Lawrence
- Camera setup: Single camera
- Running time: 26 minutes
- Production companies: Saltbeef TV; Dynamic Television; Cutting Edge Group

Original release
- Network: CBBC (United Kingdom)
- Release: 15 January 2019 – 14 July 2021

Almost Never is a British musical dramedy series that premiered on CBBC on 15 January 2019. The series details the experiences of two fictional bands after their appearances on a reality television competition and features performances from cast members in each episode. Almost Never stars Nathaniel Dass, Harry Still, Oakley Orchard, Mya-Lecia Naylor and Kimberly Wyatt. In 2020, it was announced that Almost Never had been renewed for a third series, which premiered in July 2021. After the third series the show has been cancelled and will not be renewed for a 4th series.

== Premise ==
Almost Never follows the lives of two bands, the Wonderland and Girls Here First, following their appearance on the fictional music competition series The Spotlight.

== Cast and characters ==
=== Main ===
- Nathaniel Dass as Nate, the lead singer and songwriter of the Wonderland.
- Harry Still as Harry, a guitarist in the Wonderland and the older brother of Oakley.
- Oakley Orchard as Oakley, a guitarist in the Wonderland and the younger brother of Harry.
- Kimberly Wyatt as Sasha, the controlling manager of Girls Here First.
- Mya-Lecia Naylor as Mya, a member of Girls Here First who begins a relationship with Oakley. (series 1)
- Miriam Nyarko as Miriam, a member of Girls Here First.
- Lola Moxom as Lola, a member of Girls Here First.
- Lilly Stanion as Lilly, a member of Girls Here First.
- Tillie Amartey as Chloe, a vlogger and the social media manager of the Wonderland.
- Aston Merrygold as Jordan, the manager of the Wonderland. (series 2–3)
- Tyra Rayne as Tyra, a waitress at the Palais restaurant who is asked to be a new member of Girls Here First. (series 2–3)

=== Recurring ===
- Colin Hoult as AJ, the father of Harry and Oakley who manages the Wonderland until they are signed to Coleen's company.
- Emily Atack as Meg, the mother of Harry and Oakley.
- Simran Rakar as Molly, the younger sister of Nate.
- Imogen Chadwick as Elena, the best friend of Molly and eventual social media manager of the Wonderland.
- Zina Badran as Anika, the mother of Nate and Molly. (series 1–2)
- Ryan Early as Dan, the owner of the Palais restaurant.
- Michelle Gayle as Coleen, the boss of Sasha. She signs the Wonderland to her management company. (series 1–2)
- Luke Fetherston as Fabio, Sasha's assistant and the eventual manager of Girls Here First.
- Stephen Rahman-Hughes as Dev, the father of Nate and Molly. (series 2)
- Victoria Ekanoye as Ashley, the boss of Coleen. (series 2)
- Alexis Strum as Helen, the mother of Lola. (series 3)
- Amber Davies as Jess, Dan's younger sister and Lola's coach. (series 3)

== Production ==
The second series of Almost Never filmed in Belfast from 12 August to 15 November 2019. The series was announced on 18 December 2018. Three months after the debut of the first series, it was announced that cast member Mya-Lecia Naylor had died by misadventure. For the second series, the part of Mya was not recast; instead, her absence was explained by her having left Girls Here First following the group's disastrous European tour.

The cast was increased in the second series, with the additions of Aston Merrygold and Tyra Richardson, as well as Stephen Rahman-Hughes and Victoria Ekanoye in recurring capacities. On 2 January 2020, it was announced that CBBC has renewed Almost Never for a third series. On 29 May 2020, the Almost Never Instagram account uploaded an open casting call for children aged between 13 and 17 to audition for the third series.

== International broadcast ==
In August 2021, it was announced that Almost Never had been acquired by Disney Channel; the series began airing in the United States on 4 September 2021.

== Episodes ==
Series	Episodes	Originally released	
Series	Episodes	First released	Last released
1	13	15 January 2019	
2	13	29 October 2019	31 December 2019
3	10	14 July 2021	

== Music ==
Title	Details	Ref.
Almost Never	Released: 18 January 2019; Format: Digital download, streaming	
Almost Never 2	Released: 3 January 2020; Format: Digital download, streaming	
Almost Never 3	Released: 9 July 2021; Format: Digital download, streaming	
