= 1/11 =

1/11 may refer to:

- January 11 (month-day date notation)
- November 1 (day-month date notation)
- 1st Battalion, 11th Marines, an artillery battalion of the US Marine Corps
- 2006–2008 Bangladeshi political crisis
