= Kimberley Walsh =

British dancer, singer, television presenter and actress (born 1981)

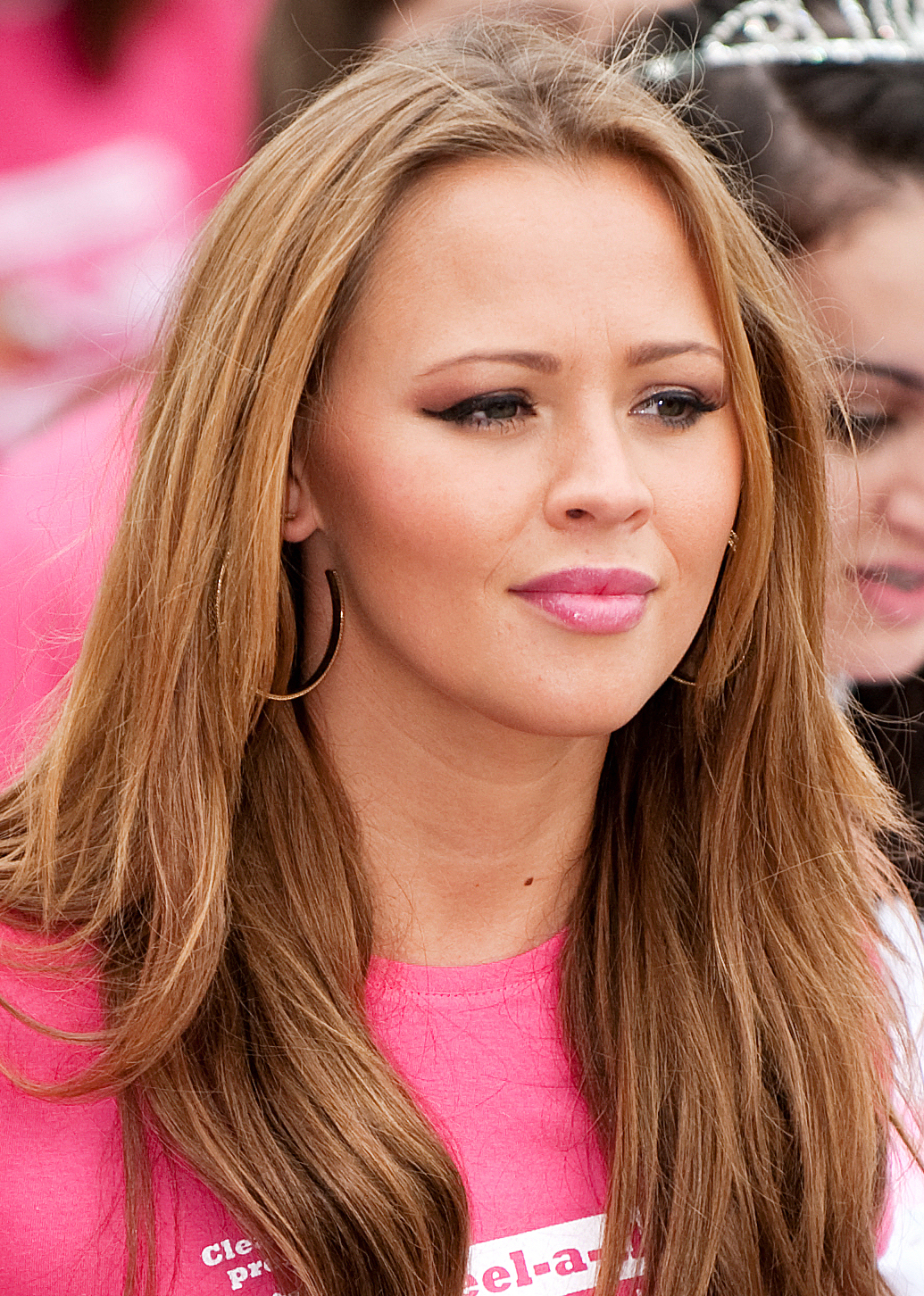
- Walsh in 2009
- Born: Kimberley Jane Walsh; 20 November 1981 (age 44); Bradford, West Yorkshire, England
- Occupations: Singer; actress; television presenter; dancer
- Years active: 1986–present
- Spouse: Justin Scott (m. 2016)
- Children: 3
- Family: Amy Walsh (sister); Toby-Alexander Smith (brother-in-law)
- Musical career
- Origin: Allerton, West Yorkshire, England
- Genres: Pop; musical theatre; R&B
- Instrument: Vocals
- Labels: Polydor; Fascination; Decca
- Member of: Girls Aloud

Kimberley Jane Scott (née Walsh; born 20 November 1981) is a British singer, dancer, television presenter and actress. She rose to fame in late 2002 when she auditioned for the reality series Popstars: The Rivals on ITV. The series announced that Walsh had won a place as a member of the girl group Girls Aloud. The group achieved large success, having twenty consecutive top ten singles (including four number ones) in the UK, six studio albums have all been certified platinum by the British Phonographic Industry (BPI), two of which went to number one in the UK, and accumulating a total of five BRIT Award nominations. In 2009, Girls Aloud won "Best Single" with their song "The Promise".

During the group's hiatus, Walsh embarked on acting and presenting. In July 2010, she became a presenter on the music talkshow, Suck My Pop and presented coverage for the BAFTA Awards. In 2011, she appeared in Horrid Henry: The Movie as Prissy Polly. Musically, Walsh has featured on Aggro Santos's "Like U Like". In 2012, Walsh made her West End theatre debut, playing Princess Fiona in the London production of Shrek the Musical. She also fronted the 2009 Autumn/Winter collection for the fashion chain New Look and, in January 2011, she was revealed as the new face of Puma AG. In 2012, Walsh took part in Strictly Come Dancing, where she finished as one of the runners-up.

Since 2011, after making her West End debut in Shrek, Walsh has returned to perform in stage versions of films such as Elf in 2015, before Big and Sleepless in Seattle both in 2019.

== Early life ==
Walsh was born on 20 November 1981 in Bradford, West Yorkshire, the daughter of John and Diane Walsh. She grew up with three siblings, Sally, Amy and Adam Walsh in Allerton, West Yorkshire. Sally played the character of Lyn Hutchinson on the soap opera Emmerdale between 1997 and 2000, and Amy joined the show's cast in 2014 as Tracy Shankley.

Walsh attended Sandy Lane Primary School, Stoney Lee Middle School, and Beckfoot Grammar School, and had her first taste of fame appearing in an Asda advert as a child along with sister Sally. She starred as Young Cosette in a regional production of Les Misérables and starred in ITV's The Book Tower in 1986. Walsh attended the Bradford theatre school, Stage 84, and briefly taught there.

== Music career ==
=== Girls Aloud ===
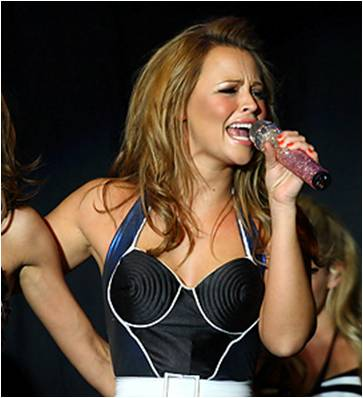
Walsh performing with Girls Aloud at Elton Hall in August 2008

Walsh auditioned for the reality television show Popstars: The Rivals in 2002 with the song "Where Do Broken Hearts Go". Several thousand applicants attended auditions across the UK in hope of being selected. Ten girls and ten boys were chosen as finalists by judges Pete Waterman, Louis Walsh and Geri Halliwell. Walsh did not initially make it into the group of ten female contestants who were to appear on the show. However, when another contestant was disqualified on a technicality, she found herself on the show. These finalists then took to the stage participating in weekly Saturday night live performances which alternated weekly between the girls and boys. Each week, the contestant polling the fewest phone votes was eliminated, until the final line-ups of the groups emerged. Walsh joined Nadine Coyle, Sarah Harding, Nicola Roberts, and Cheryl Tweedy to comprise the new girl group Girls Aloud, formed through the show by a public vote on 30 November 2002.

The group's debut single, "Sound of the Underground", peaked at number one on the UK Singles Chart, becoming the 2002 Christmas number one. Girls Aloud hold the record for the shortest time between formation and reaching number one. The group released their debut album, Sound of the Underground, in May 2003, which entered the charts at number two and was certified platinum by the British Phonographic Industry (BPI) later the same year. Their singles "I'll Stand by You", "Walk This Way", and "The Promise" have charted at number one. Two of their albums have reached the top of the UK Albums Chart: their greatest hits album The Sound of Girls Aloud and 2008's Out of Control, both of which entered the chart at number one, with over one million copies of the former being sold.

They also achieved seven certified albums and have been nominated for five Brit Awards, winning the 2009 Best Single for "The Promise".

The group's musical style is pop, but throughout their career they had experimented with electropop and dance-pop. Girls Aloud's collaborations with Brian Higgins and his songwriting and production team Xenomania earned the group critical acclaim, due to an innovative approach to mainstream pop music. The group became one of the few UK reality television acts to achieve continued success, amassing a fortune of £30 million by May 2010. Guinness World Records lists them as "Most Successful Reality TV Group" in the 2007 edition. They also hold the record for "Most Consecutive Top Ten Entries in the UK by a Female Group" in the 2008 edition, and are credited again for "Most Successful Reality TV Group" in the 2011 edition. The group was also named the United Kingdom's biggest selling girl group of the 21st century, with over 4.3 million singles sales and 4 million albums sold in the UK alone.

In July 2009, Girls Aloud announced they would take a year-long hiatus to pursue solo projects. Walsh revealed that she does not think it is possible Girls Aloud will ever "officially break up". She explained that they are planning to tour again and will probably take breaks from time to time, doing solo projects but they will never permanently go their separate ways.

After Girls Aloud's three years of hiatus, the group reunited for their 10th anniversary. The group released their new single, "Something New" on 18 November 2012. The music video for the song was filmed in October 2012, and premiered on YouTube on 19 October 2012. The song was also the official charity single for Children in Need in 2012. The group released their second greatest hits compilation, Ten on 26 November 2012. In 2013, the group embarked on Ten - The Hits Tour 2013. They announced their disbanding shortly after the tour ended.

In May and June 2024, Walsh and her Girls Aloud bandmates got back together for an arena tour titled The Girls Aloud Show in memory of their late bandmate Sarah Harding.

=== Solo work ===
It was first rumoured that Walsh was about to make a record deal with her band's record label, Fascination Records, although nothing has been confirmed. Soon after the rumour, Walsh confirmed on Suck My Pop, a programme that she co-hosts on the television channel Viva in the United Kingdom, that she will feature on English rapper Aggro Santos' upcoming single, "Like U Like". The track will be her first step away from Girls Aloud as a singer. Walsh was asked for OK! Magazine: "Kimberley, there are rumours, that you will be releasing a solo album..." and Walsh said: "Gosh! I haven't got any plan to do that. Gary Barlow signed Aggro Santos and he asked me to sing Like U Like, and I've done a song for the Horrid Henry film that I'm in titled "Everybody Dance". I'm not sure about doing anything big on my own just yet." In 2012 she made her West End theatre debut, playing Princess Fiona in the London production of Shrek the Musical. The announcement came after Amanda Holden announced her pregnancy in August 2011. Walsh teamed up with Alfie Boe to record a version of Queen's "One Vision" as the Official Olympic Team Great Britain Single. Walsh has also performed with several artists including Neyo with "Hate That I Love You", Ronan Keating's "No Matter What" and James Cullum with "Rainy Days and Mondays". In August 2012 it was announced that Walsh is in discussions with Gary Barlow to release a solo album for a 2013 release.

On 7 September 2012, Walsh was announced as one of the 14 celebrities, competing in tenth series of Strictly Come Dancing. Her professional partner is last year's runner-up Pasha Kovalev. She received three perfect 40s during the series, and she finished as one of the runners-up alongside presenter Denise Van Outen, behind the winner Olympian Louis Smith.

On 4 February 2013, Walsh released, through Decca Records, her debut album, Centre Stage, which features a series of popular musical tunes as well as two brand new tracks.

Walsh has written her autobiography, called A Whole Lot of History, which was released on 26 September 2013.

In March 2014, Walsh took part in recording England's 2014 World Cup song. She collaborated with the likes of fellow pop stars Melanie C, Eliza Doolittle, Emma Bunton, Conor Maynard, Katy B and Pixie Lott, on "Greatest Day", a track originally performed by British band, Take That. The track was produced by Gary Barlow and recorded at Sarm Studios in London.

== Acting ==
Before Walsh became a member of Girls Aloud, she had worked in theatre and acting. In 2000, Walsh appeared in the television series This Is Personal: The Hunt for the Yorkshire Ripper as Gillian Oldfield, and starred in a BBC Educational Schools programme called Focus. In the same year, Walsh auditioned for the role of Maria Sutherland in Coronation Street. However, she lost out to Samia Ghadie. In 2001, Walsh played Tracy in Dream Back. In 2007, alongside her bandmates, she appeared in St. Trinian's playing a school band member. In 2008, she and her bandmate Nicola Roberts had small parts in Britannia High, in which they played themselves.

Walsh stated that she would like to star in a musical in the future, playing a stage role. In October 2007, she successfully auditioned for the role of a cast member of Les Misérables, and was also allowed to sing an encore of "On My Own" in character. The process was shown on the reality TV series The Passions of Girls Aloud, which aired in March 2008.

In late 2010, Walsh landed a role in the live-action 3D family comedy film Horrid Henry: The Movie as the titular character's overactive cousin Prissy Polly, with the film being released on 29 July 2011. Walsh also appeared in the 2013 movie All Stars, alongside Theo Stevenson once again, whom she appeared with first in Horrid Henry: The Movie. She plays the minor role of his character's mother.

On 5 October 2011 through 21 May 2012, she made her West End theatre debut, playing Princess Fiona in the London production of Shrek the Musical. The announcement came after Amanda Holden announced her pregnancy in August 2011. Originally signed on until 27 February 2012, she extended her run to 21 May 2012. She subsequently returned to the West End stage in October 2015, playing the role of Jovie in Elf: The Musical.

In 2018, she appeared in the second series of the Channel 4 school drama Ackley Bridge as Claire Butterworth. On her casting, she commented: "It was nice to hear the northern accent everywhere you turn. A lot of the kids were really excited that I was there because I was from Bradford. It's a very small town and a lot of the kids came from there that were in the show."

In 2019, she returned to theatre when she played Susan in the Original London Cast of Big The Musical alongside Jay McGuiness as Tom Hank's character of Josh. In 2020; Walsh reunited with McGuiness to originate the role of Annie in Sleepless: The Musical, based on Sleepless in Seattle which, due to COVID-19 restrictions, only ran for a limited season.

=== Presenting ===
Walsh appeared in Let's Dance for Sport Relief as a panellist and also fronted coverage of the BAFTA Awards for MTV on her own programme Kimberley Walsh at the BAFTAS in 2010 and in the summer of 2010 hosted sky 1 documentary "Girl in the Blue Jeans". She also presented coverage for The X Factor live from South Shields on the day of the final in 2009 for Joe McElderry. On 17 – 18 June 2010, Walsh hosted Channel 4's The 5 O'Clock Show with Stephen Mulhern. Walsh appeared in her own documentary for Sky 1 named Kimberley Walsh: Blue Jean Girl which aired on Wednesday, 17 June 2010. On the same day, Walsh appeared on This Morning to promote the show. Walsh later became a presenter of new music talk-show titled Suck My Pop, on Viva. Walsh also starred as a judge for ITV's entertainment show Born to Shine.

On 9 April 2016, Walsh co-presented Weekend Brunch the Grand National Day special with Tim Lovejoy.

Walsh has co-presented BBC's Morning Live since 2022.

== Commercial advertising and promotions ==
Walsh was the face of high-street fashion chain New Look.

She was also named as the new face and hair of Schwarzkopf for a reported 6 figure deal. In January 2011, Walsh was revealed as the new face of Puma AG BodyTrain fitness toner wear. In May 2011, Walsh was named as the face of Right Guard's Xtreme Dry Range.

In September 2019, she signed with outdoor clothing company Regatta.

In March 2022, Walsh started working with DIY chain Wickes. She has helped develop and launch new interior and garden paint colours. Speaking to Ideal Home in 2024, she revealed DIY had been an interest since childhood. As part of her involvement with Wickes Community Programme, she assisted with the renovation of the parish hall in Walton, Aylesbury.

== Charitable activities ==
Walsh climbed Mount Kilimanjaro in aid of Comic Relief in March 2009. The climb, organised by Gary Barlow, was also undertaken by fellow Girls Aloud member Cheryl, Alesha Dixon, Fearne Cotton, Denise Van Outen, Chris Moyles, Ben Shephard, Ronan Keating and Barlow himself.

In March 2011, Walsh teamed up with Tess Daly and Joanna Page to work with Maltesers to promote Red Nose Day 2011.

Walsh is also a charity ambassador for Breast Cancer Haven. She helped open a £2.2 million breast cancer centre in 2008 and participated in a "heel-a-thon" in 2009.

== Other ventures ==
Walsh became OK! magazine's new weekly columnist in August 2010. The column is called "Kimberley Calls The Shots".

In 2017, Walsh launched a children's clothing line called "Kimba's Kids", which she runs with her brother.

=== Strictly Come Dancing ===
In September 2012, Walsh was revealed as one of the 14 celebrities competing in the 10th series of the BBC reality dancing competition Strictly Come Dancing. Her professional partner was Pasha Kovalev. On 22 December 2012, Walsh and Kovalev became the joint runners-up in the final, along with Chicago star Denise van Outen and James Jordan, behind Olympic gymnast Louis Smith and Flavia Cacace.

Week #	Dance / Song	Judges' scores					Result
Week #	Dance / Song	Horwood	Bussell	Goodman	Tonioli	Total	Result
1	Cha-cha-cha / "Domino"	7	7	7	7	28	No elimination
2	Foxtrot / "Someone Like You"	7	6	6	7	26	Safe
3	Quickstep / "Get Happy"	7	7	7	8	29	Safe
4	Paso doble / "Hungry Like the Wolf"	8	8	7	8	31	Safe
5	Salsa / "Naughty Girl"	8	8	8	9	33	Safe
6	Viennese waltz / "A Thousand Years"	8	8	9	9	34	Bottom two
7	Samba / "Livin' la Vida Loca"	8	8	9	9	34	Safe
8	Tango / "When Doves Cry"	8	9	8	9	34	Safe
9	Jive / "Land of Thousand Dances"	9	8	8	9	34	Safe
10	Fusion (Cha-cha-cha/Tango) / "It's Raining Men"	10	10	10	10	40	Safe
11	American Smooth / "Fever"; Charleston / "Those Magnificent Men"	9; 10	10; 10	9; 10	10; 10	38; 40	Safe
12	Viennese waltz / "A Thousand Years"; Freestyle / "Crazy in Love"; Tango / "When Doves Cry"	9; 9; 10	10; 10; 10	10; 10; 10	10; 10; 10	39; 39; 40	Runner-up

== Personal life ==
Walsh married long-term partner Justin Scott, a former member of the British boy band Triple 8, on 30 January 2016. Together, the couple have three sons.

== Discography ==
=== Studio albums ===
Title	Album details	Peak chart positions		
Title	Album details	UK	IRE	SCO
Centre Stage	Released: 4 February 2013; Label: Decca Records; Formats: CD, digital download	18	99	23

=== Singles ===
==== As lead artist ====
Year	Title	Album
2011	"Everybody Dance"	Horrid Henry: The Movie (Original Motion Picture Soundtrack)
2013	"One Day I'll Fly Away"	Centre Stage

==== As featured artist ====
Year	Title	Peak chart positions		Album
Year	Title	UK	IRE	Album
2011	"Like U Like" (Aggro Santos featuring Kimberley Walsh)	8	13	AggroSantos.com
2012	"One Vision" (with Alfie Boe)	—	—	Team Great Britain
2014	"The Road" (Alistair Griffin featuring Kimberley Walsh)	196	—	—N/a
"—" denotes single that did not chart or was not released.

== Filmography ==
Year	Title	Role	Notes
1986	The Book Tower	Small child	Television series
2000	This Is Personal: The Hunt for the Yorkshire Ripper	Gillian Oldfield	2 episodes
2001	Dream	Tracy	
2002	Popstars: The Rivals	Contestant (won)	4 episodes
2005	Girls Aloud: Home Truths	Herself	Main role
2006	Girls Aloud: Off the Record	Herself	Series regular
2007	The Friday Night Project	Presenter	Guest star
2007	St. Trinian's	Herself	Cameo
2008	The Passions of Girls Aloud	Herself	Main role
2008	The Girls Aloud Party	Presenter and performer	Television special
2008	Britania High	Herself	Guest star
2010	Suck My Pop	Herself: Presenter	Television special
2011	Horrid Henry: The Movie	Prissy Polly	
2012	Strictly Come Dancing	Herself	Television special
2012	Girls Aloud: Ten Years at the Top	Herself	Documentary
2013	Ten: The Hits Tour	Herself	Concert film
2013	All Stars	Trish	
2014	Loose Women	Guest panellist	Television special
2016	The Great Sport Relief Bake Off	Contestant	Television special
2016	Weekend Brunch	Co-presenter	Television special
2017	The Lodge	Rebecca	5 episodes
2018	Ackley Bridge	Claire Butterworth	2 episodes
2021; Present	Morning Live	Co-presenter	Television special
2022	The Masked Dancer	Odd Socks	Television special
2022	I Used To Be Famous	Herself / Television presenter	Streaming film

== Awards ==
She placed number 37 in FHM's annual list of "100 Sexiest Woman in the World" in 2009 ahead of bandmates Nadine Coyle, Nicola Roberts and Sarah Harding who were placed at 57, 58 and 87 respectively. Walsh also won the Yorkshire Woman of the Year award 2009 in recognition not only of her professional success but also for her role as celebrity ambassador for the Breast Cancer Haven charity, which has a branch in Leeds. She was too, awarded the Cosmopolitan Ultimate Woman's award in 2009.

== See also ==
- List of Strictly Come Dancing contestants
