= 111 (Her Majesty & the Wolves album) =

Studio album by Her Majesty & the Wolves
- Released: July 11, 2011 (UK)
- Recorded: 2010–11 (Los Angeles, California)
- Genre: Dance-pop
- Length: 47:43
- Label: Chime Entertainment
- Producer: Spencer Nezey

Her Majesty & the Wolves chronology
| Her Majesty & the Wolves EP (2011) | 111 (2011) |

Singles from Her Majesty & the Wolves
- 1. "Glaciers" Released: August 27, 2010; 2. "Stars in Your Eyes" Released: January 10, 2011; 3. "Goodbye, Goodnight" Released: October 18, 2011

111 is the debut studio album recorded by American dance duo Her Majesty & the Wolves. It was released on 11 July 2011 in UK through Chime Entertainment. Album was produced by a duo member, MC and producer Spencer Nezey and was promoted with three singles: "Glaciers" on August 27, 2010, "Stars in Your Eyes" on January 10, 2011, and "Goodbye, Goodnight" on October 18, 2011. It was recorded in Los Angeles, California between 2010 and 2011.

== Background ==
Her Majesty & the Wolves was formed when former Pussycat Dolls member, dancer and singer Kimberly Wyatt and former Jupiter Rising member, MC and producer Spencer Nezey met in Los Angeles, California in 2010. Kimberly, while working on her debut album, became frustrated when most of the producers that she worked with were focusing on "making something that people will listen to now". Whereas Nezey wanted to make something that "people will listen to in the future", which Kimberly agreed with. They signed to Chime Entertainment and released debut single "Glaciers" in August 2010. They started recording album in Los Angeles that year and finished following year. In 2010, they released mixtape Her Majesty & the Wolves Presents: Spring 2010 Mixtape.

== Promotion ==
=== EP ===
Their four track self-titled EP, containing singles "Glaciers", "Stars in Your Eyes" and their remixes, was released on 25 January 2011 via Chime Entertainment.

=== Singles ===
Three singles off the album were released. First, "Glaciers" was released on 27 August 2010. It was followed by "Stars in Your Eyes" which was released on 9 November as a music video. Its official single release was on 10 January 2011, six months before 111 was released. On 18 October, third and final single from album "Goodbye, Goodnight" was released.

== Track listing ==
1. "HMATW Intro" – 2:27
2. "Stars in Your Eyes" – 3:37
3. "Walking on the Sun" – 3:16
4. "Emerald Showers" – 4:28
5. "Shades of Grey" – 3:09
6. "Goodbye, Goodnight" – 3:09
7. "Dream" – 1:08
8. "Never Come Down" – 4:01
9. "Glaciers" – 4:04
10. "Spinning Circles" – 4:01
11. "Rise" – 1:24
12. "Head in the Clouds" – 3:20
13. "Nocturnal" – 1:39
14. "Cut Me Down" – 3:10
15. "Our Love" – 4:54
16. "Mantra" – 1:56

== Release history ==
| Country | Date | Format | Label |
|---|---|---|---|
| United Kingdom | July 11, 2011 | CD, digital download | Chime Entertainment |
| United States | July 11, 2011 | Digital download | Chime Entertainment |
