= Camilla Kerslake (album) =

Studio album by Camilla Kerslake
- Released: 23 November 2009
- Recorded: 2009
- Genre: Classical crossover

Camilla Kerslake chronology
Camilla Kerslake (2009)	Moments (2011)

Camilla Kerslake is a 2009 album by the classical crossover artist Camilla Kerslake, released on 23 November 2009 in the UK.

== Track listing ==
1. "She Moved Through the Fair"
2. "How Can I Keep From Singing?"
3. "I Can't Help Falling in Love"
4. "Rule the World (Il Mondo é Nostro)"
5. "Rain"
6. "Balulalow"
7. "Pie Jesu"
8. "Panis angelicus"
9. "Closest Thing to Crazy"
10. "Cavatina"
11. "In Paradisum"
12. "Largo"

Bonus CD

1. "Silent Night"
2. "In the Bleak Midwinter"
3. "The First Noel"
4. "Abide With Me"
5. "White Christmas"

Chart (2009)	Peak position
UK Albums Chart	50
