= 11/1 =

11/1 may refer to:

- November 1 (month-day date notation)
- January 11 (day-month date notation)
- 11 shillings and 1 penny in UK predecimal currency
