= Sky Songs =

British online music service

- Founded: October 2009
- Headquarters: United Kingdom

Sky Songs was an online music service launched in Oct 2009 by British Sky Broadcasting.

The site combined subscription music streaming with an MP3 download service and was available only in the United Kingdom.

UK-based technology hub site Electric Pig was one of the first to try out and report on the beta service, writing a comparative report featuring Sky Songs, Spotify and Napster.

The site had the full backing and support of the four major record labels Sony Music, EMI Music, Universal Music and Warner Music plus major independents including Beggars Group, PIAS Entertainment Group and The Orchard.

Sky recruited online music expert Justin Moodie from HMV's web team to serve as the service's general manager.

After a little more than a year, the service was discontinued.
