= Camilla Kerslake =

British singer

- Born: Camilla Morgan Kerslake
- Origin: London, England
- Genres: Classical crossover, operatic pop
- Instrument: Vocals
- Years active: 2009–present
- Label: Future Records (2009–2012)
- Spouse: Chris Robshaw

Camilla Kerslake is a British classical crossover singer from London who was the first signing to Gary Barlow's record label. She released her debut album on 23 November 2009 in the UK.

== Background ==
Kerslake was born in Dulwich to a Welsh mother and New Zealand-born father. The family moved to New Zealand shortly after and lived there until returning to the United Kingdom eight years later. Living in a small village outside of Preston called Nateby, later moving to London and after attending Esher College, Kerslake sought singing lessons, but opted to sing contemporary as she could not afford classical training.

In 2008, after years of auditioning, Kerslake won a place in an all-girl pop group. She was initially selected, but was let go soon afterwards owing to their feeling that, at age twenty, she was too old. Motivated to try harder, she started performing in pubs and working men's clubs as well as in an ABBA tribute band to finance her own classical singing lessons.

On 26 June 2018, she married Chris Robshaw, a former captain of the England national rugby union team, at Chelsea Old Town Hall, London. Their reception was 3 days later at Le Preverger, a chateau in Cote D'Azur, France.

On 8 February 2021, it was revealed that Kerslake and Robshaw were expecting their first child. Their first child, a boy was born in May 2021.

== Career ==
In early 2009, Kerslake learned of a studio where Gary Barlow was recording. She submitted her demo CD "every day for six weeks" until Barlow finally listened to it. As he was instantly impressed, Kerslake promptly became Barlow's first signing under his new label, Future Records.

Her first album, Camilla Kerslake, was released 23 November 2009. A song from this album, the Christian hymn "How Can I Keep from Singing?", was featured in a 2009 Waitrose supermarket Christmas advert. She would later perform this song on the first week of Popstar to Operastar as a guest performer, with Gary Barlow accompanying her on piano.

At the 2010 Classic Brit Awards Kerslake was nominated for NS&I album of the year, and her live performance from the ceremony, with classical boy band Blake and Howard Goodall's Enchanted voices, was chosen to become the first ever charity single release from the awards.

Kerslake sang the United Kingdom's national anthem at Wembley Stadium before the 2010 football League Cup final between Manchester United and Aston Villa. She sang "Abide with Me" at the Challenge Cup final between Leeds Rhinos and Warrington Wolves in 2010.

Camilla also performed the national anthem for the Queen's arrival at The Derby in 2010 as well as two charity concerts for the royal family, one at Buckingham Palace for the future King Charles III and Queen Camilla, and two at Windsor Castle for Prince Edward.

Following a West End run, Kerslake was forced to pull out of the Les Misérables 25th Anniversary Concert on 3 October 2010 at The O_{2} Arena under doctor's orders, owing to a throat infection. Katie Hall was selected to replace her. In November 2012 she appeared in two sold out-performances at the O_{2}with tenor Andrea Bocelli.

Kerslake's second album, Moments, was released on 21 March 2011 to critical acclaim.

in June 2011 Kerslake's mother, Dr Deborah Kerslake, was diagnosed with breast cancer and Camilla suspended all non-charitable work commitments until Deborah was given the all clear in August 2012. Kerslake has since become an ambassador for The Royal Marsden NHS Foundation Trust and Breast Cancer Campaign.

== Tours and live work ==
Kerslake has toured with English tenor Russell Watson, Irish Catholic group The Priests, classical girl band All Angels and vocal trio Blake as well as Christmas performances with Simon Cowell's crossover supergroup Il Divo and arena shows with Andrea Bocelli.

== Music and voice ==
Kerslake has been described as a coloratura soprano, and can reach top B above high C (B6). as seen in "Stars at Night" from her first album Camilla Kerslake and her live performances of "Canto Della Terra". She has performed as Cosette in London's West End production of Les Misérables, which requires her to sing up to C6 in the number "One Day More."

== Discography ==
| Album | Year | UK Albums | UK Classical | Sales |
|---|---|---|---|---|
| Camilla Kerslake | 2009 | 50 | 4 | Silver |
| Moments | 2011 | 90 | N/A | N/A |
