= AD 111 =

111 in various calendars
- Gregorian calendar: 111; CXI
- Ab urbe condita: 864
- Assyrian calendar: 4861
- Balinese saka calendar: 32–33
- Bengali calendar: −483 – −482
- Berber calendar: 1061
- Buddhist calendar: 655
- Burmese calendar: −527
- Byzantine calendar: 5619–5620
- Chinese calendar: 庚戌年 (Metal Dog); 2808 or 2601 — to — 辛亥年 (Metal Pig); 2809 or 2602
- Coptic calendar: −173 – −172
- Discordian calendar: 1277
- Ethiopian calendar: 103–104
- Hebrew calendar: 3871–3872
- Hindu calendars
- Vikram Samvat: 167–168
- Shaka Samvat: 32–33
- Kali Yuga: 3211–3212
- Holocene calendar: 10111
- Iranian calendar: 511 BP – 510 BP
- Islamic calendar: 527 BH – 526 BH
- Javanese calendar: N/A
- Julian calendar: 111; CXI
- Korean calendar: 2444
- Minguo calendar: 1801 before ROC 民前1801年
- Nanakshahi calendar: −1357
- Seleucid era: 422/423 AG
- Thai solar calendar: 653–654
- Tibetan calendar: ལྕགས་ཕོ་ཁྱི་ལོ་ (male Iron-Dog); 237 or −144 or −916 — to — ལྕགས་མོ་ཕག་ལོ་ (female Iron-Boar); 238 or −143 or −915

Year 111 (CXI) was a common year starting on Wednesday of the Julian calendar. At the time, it was known as the Year of the Consulship of Piso and Bolanus (or, less frequently, year 864 Ab urbe condita). The denomination 111 for this year has been used since the early medieval period, when the Anno Domini calendar era became the prevalent method in Europe for naming years.

== Events ==
=== By place ===
==== Roman Empire ====
- Emperor Trajan sends Pliny the Younger to be governor (legatus Augusti) of Bithynia.

== Births ==
- Antinous, Bithynian Greek lover of Emperor Hadrian (d. 130)
