= Aggro Santos =

Brazilian-British rapper (born 1989)

- Born: Yuri Santos; 12 October 1989 (age 37); São Paulo, Brazil
- Origin: Balham, London, England
- Genres: Hip hop; UK garage
- Occupation: Rapper
- Instrument: Vocals
- Years active: 2006–present
- Labels: Mercury; FOD Records

Yuri "Aggro" Santos (born 12 October 1989) is a British rapper.

== Early life ==
Yuri Santos was born on 12 October 1989. He studied at Salesian College in Battersea, London, and went on to study at the BRIT School.

== Career ==
Santos was discovered by ChannelAka, a music channel, after his song "Free Yard" was featured on the network. He was then signed to Future Records in 2010, and released his second mixtape, Rhythm N Flow. In 2010, he was nominated for an award at the Urban Music Awards.

Santos released his debut single "Candy", which features Kimberly Wyatt, on 2 May 2010, which was later certified silver by the BPI. His second single, "Saint or Sinner", was released on 22 August 2010 and his third, "Like U Like", (featuring Kimberley Walsh), was released on 14 January 2011. Santos's debut album, titled AggroSantos.com was released on 31 January 2011. In 2010, Santos participated in the tenth series of I'm a Celebrity...Get Me Out of Here! and was voted off the show on day 19, finishing in fifth place overall. In 2013, Santos signed to FOD Records. In 2014, he began writing for upcoming music. On 23 March 2014, he released the video for "Selfie Selfie Selfie".

== Legal issues ==
At a trial held at Chichester Crown Court in 2013, Santos was found not guilty of two charges of rape in incidents dated to 2010 and 2011.

== Discography ==
=== Studio albums ===
List of albums, with selected chart positions and certifications
Title	Album details	Peak	
Title	Album details	UK	UK R&B
AggroSantos.com	Released: 31 January 2011; Formats: CD, digital download; Labels: Mercury Records	155	24

=== Mixtapes ===
- Aggro Culture (2009)
- The Rhythm N Flow (2010)
- The Stamina (2010)

=== Singles ===
==== As main artist ====
List of singles, with selected chart positions
Title	Year	Peak chart positions							Certifications	Album
Title	Year	UK	EUR	IRE	LTV	POL	SCO	US Dance	Certifications	Album
"Free Yard"	2006	—	—	—	—	—	—	—		non-album singles
"Culo!"	2009	—	—	—	—	—	—	—		non-album singles
"Rhythm 'N' Flow"	2009	—	—	—	—	—	—	—		non-album singles
"Candy" (featuring Kimberly Wyatt)	2010	5	20	14	20	5	4	—	UK: Silver	AggroSantos.com
"Saint or Sinner"	2010	19	—	—	—	—	27	—		AggroSantos.com
"Like U Like" (featuring Kimberley Walsh)	2011	8	—	13	—	—	7	—		AggroSantos.com
"So Sexy"	2012	—	—	—	—	—	—	—		non-album singles
"Love Like This"	2013	—	—	—	—	—	—	—		non-album singles
"Selfie, Selfie, Selfie"	2014	—	—	—	—	—	—	—		non-album singles
"Red Lips" (featuring Andreea Bănică)	2015	—	—	—	—	—	—	13		non-album singles
"Bomba"	2017	—	—	—	—	—	—	18		non-album singles
"—" denotes releases that did not chart or were not released in that territory.

==== As featured artist ====
Title	Year	Album
"Monkey See Monkey Do" (Girls featuring Aggro Santos)	2013	non-album singles
"Party Vybz" (DJ Assassin featuring Aggro Santos and Blacfyah)	2017	non-album singles

=== Other appearances ===
Title	Year	Other artist(s)	Album
"Step the Levels Up"	2009	Kozzie	Straight of the Book
"Bem ou Mal 0.2"	2010	NX Zero	Projeto Paralelo

=== Music videos ===
List of music videos
Title	Year	Director(s)
"Candy"	2010	Emil Nava
"Saint or Sinner"	2010	Orson Nava
"Like U Like"	2010	Lennox Brothers
