= Kimberly Wyatt =

British-American singer (born 1982)

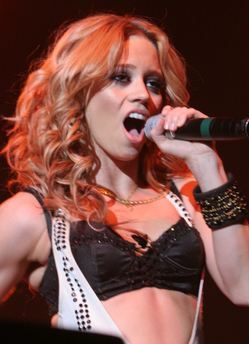
- Wyatt performing in 2006
- Born: Kimberly Kaye Wyatt; February 4, 1982 (age 44); Warrensburg, Missouri, U.S.
- Occupations: Singer; dancer; actress; television personality
- Years active: 2001–present
- Spouse: Max Rogers (m. 2014)
- Children: 3
- Musical career
- Genre: Pop
- Instrument: Vocals
- Label: Chime
- Member of: The Pussycat Dolls
- Formerly of: Her Majesty & the Wolves
- Website: beautifulmovements.dipdive.com

Kimberly Kaye Wyatt (born February 4, 1982) is an American singer, dancer, actress, and television personality. She is a member of the girl group and dance ensemble the Pussycat Dolls; and was half of pop duo Her Majesty & the Wolves (2010–2014). Her acting roles include Siyotanka in the American comedy series Poor Paul (2009–2011) and Sasha in the British musical drama series Almost Never (2019–2021).

Wyatt has served as a judge on television dance competition shows including Got to Dance (2009–2014), Live to Dance (2011), Got to Dance Poland (2013), and Taking The Next Step (2016–2018). She has appeared as a contestant on British reality television shows, including The Jump (2014), Celebrity MasterChef (2015), and Dancing on Ice (2022).

== Early life ==
Wyatt was born in Warrensburg, Missouri and began dancing at the age of seven. At age 14, she earned a scholarship to study in New York's Joffrey Ballet and the Broadway Dance Center. She graduated high school at age seventeen and flew to Las Vegas to audition for cruise ship and casino shows. She worked in a revue on Royal Caribbean's Explorer of the Seas for two years. Wyatt moved to Los Angeles seeking auditions in film and television while working in a Pizza Hut restaurant and as a telemarketer.

== Career ==
=== 2002–2009: The Pussycat Dolls ===
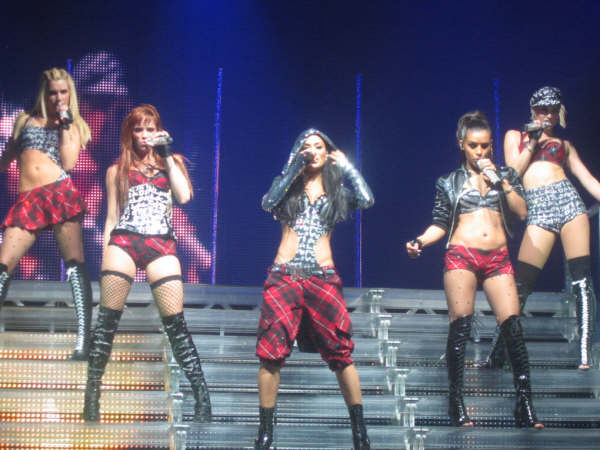
The Pussycat Dolls performing "Buttons" in Aberdeen, Scotland, during the Doll Domination Tour

Her first Los Angeles gig came as a Fly Girl–style dancer on Cedric the Entertainer Presents (2002–2003). In a later interview she called it one of her "most humiliating L.A. gigs," recalling that she was required to perform in revealing costumes such as lingerie and clear raincoats while under contract. Around the same time, Wyatt was hired by Nick Lachey as a backup dancer; the audition and her involvement later aired on the reality series Newlyweds: Nick & Jessica. There she met Lachey’s choreographer, Robin Antin, who invited her to join the Pussycat Dolls, a burlesque revue created and directed by Antin.

By 2005, the line-up was reduced to six: Carmit Bachar, Ashley Roberts, Nicole Scherzinger, Jessica Sutta, Melody Thornton, and Wyatt who signed a contract with the Pussycat Dolls partnership, receiving a percentage of the group's revenues; however, it was later revealed that the members were actually salaried employees of the label. They released their self-titled debut album in September 2005. The record spawned the singles "Don't Cha" "Stickwitu and "Buttons", each of which reached the top five of the Billboard Hot 100. "Stickwitu" earned Wyatt a Grammy Award nomination for Best Pop Performance by a Duo or Group with Vocals. The album went on to sell seven million copies worldwide (Note: Worldwide sales figures for PCD as of August 2008.) and established the group as viable in the music industry earning them a reputation among the century's few breakout successes.

Wyatt appeared as a contestant on the VH1 magic reality show Celebracadabra in April 2008, where she was eliminated in fifth episode. The group's second and final studio album Doll Domination was released in September 2008 and attained their highest position on the Billboard 200 (number four). The album is considered a commercial disappointment selling less than 400,000 copies in the US which propelled the label to reissue the album with new songs. (Note: US sales figures for Doll Domination as of April 2009.) The album and its reissues spawned three top-twenty singles: "When I Grow Up", "I Hate This Part", and "Jai Ho! (You Are My Destiny)". The last drew controversy by crediting Scherzinger as a featured artist, fueling internal tensions. The group would then confirm a hiatus in September 2009. In December 2009, Wyatt debuted as a judge on Sky1's Got to Dance, a reality show seeking Britain's top dance act.

=== 2009–2018: Her Majesty & the Wolves and television ===
In 2009, Wyatt played Siyotanka in the politically incorrect comedy series Poor Paul. From 2009 to 2014, she was a judge of the British dance competition show Got to Dance for five seasons. In 2010, she was featured on Aggro Santos's hit single "Candy"; the song peaked at number five on the UK singles chart. Also in 2010, Wyatt formed the electropop duo Her Majesty & the Wolves with Spencer Nezey from Jupiter Rising; they released their debut single "Glaciers" that August. Their debut studio album, 111, was released on July 11, 2011, preceding the singles "Stars in Your Eyes" and "Goodbye, Goodnight". The duo performed live for the next four years, until 2014. In 2011, she was a judge on the dance competition show Live to Dance, the American version of Got to Dance, along with Paula Abdul and Travis Payne.

In 2014, Wyatt competeted in the winter sports talent show The Jump and in 2015 she won the final of the cooking reality show Celebrity MasterChef. From 2016 to 2018, she was judge of the British dance competition Taking The Next Step for three seasons.

=== 2019–present: The Pussycat Dolls reunions and acting ===
Wyatt performing on the PCD Forever Tour in September 2026

From 2019 to 2021, Wyatt played Sasha, a controlling and arrogant music manager, in the CBBC series Almost Never. On November 29, 2019, on the finale of The X Factor: Celebrity, Wyatt joined the Pussycat Dolls reunion, performing a live medley of their previous singles and their new song "React." British media regulator Ofcom received over 400 complaints from viewers who criticized the band's perceived provocative nature of their performance. "React" was released in February 2020 to moderate success. Their reunion tour, a 45-date run originally scheduled for April 2020, was postponed multiple times due to the COVID-19 pandemic and was ultimately cancelled in January 2022 amid a legal dispute between Scherzinger and Antin over the terms of the group's business arrangements. In 2022, she was a contestant on Dancing on Ice. In November 2024, she joined Hits Radio, presenting on Sunday evenings. In March 2026, it was announced that Wyatt would once again be joining the Pussycat Dolls for another reunion, this time as part of a trio alongside Scherzinger and Roberts.

== Personal life ==
Since 2010, Wyatt has established herself in the United Kingdom, and resides in Surrey, England. In 2011, she began a relationship with model Max Rogers and they married in February 2014. They have three children, two daughters and a son. Wyatt revealed in October 2019 that she was sterilized after giving birth to her third child.

In 2015, Wyatt became an ambassador of Youth Sport Trust, promoting health and well-being for young women.

== Filmography ==
=== Television ===
| Year | Title | Role | Notes |
|---|---|---|---|
| 2002–2003 | Cedric the Entertainer Presents | Dancer | |
| 2007 | Celebracadabra | Contestant | |
| 2009–2011 | Poor Paul | Siyotanka | Recurring role |
| 2009–2014 | Got to Dance | Judge | |
| 2011 | Live to Dance | Judge | |
| 2011 | 8 Out of 10 Cats | Guest panelist | Series 12 Episode 9 |
| 2013 | Got to Dance Poland | Guest judge | Episode: "Final" |
| 2014 | The Jump | Contestant | Season 1 |
| 2015 | Celebrity MasterChef | Contestant | Season 10 |
| 2015 | Storage Hunters: Celebrity Special | Herself | Christmas Special |
| 2016 | The Keith & Paddy Picture Show | Penny | Episode: "Dirty Dancing" |
| 2016–2018 | Taking The Next Step | Judge | |
| 2017 | Would I Lie to You? | Guest panellist | British game show |
| 2019–2021 | Almost Never | Sasha | Main role |
| 2022 | Dancing on Ice | Contestant | Season 14 |
| 2023 | Don't Look Down | Participant | Channel 4 show in aid of Stand Up To Cancer charity |
| 2026 | RuPaul's Drag Race: UK vs. the World | Special guest | Series 3 |

=== Film ===
| Year | Title | Role |
|---|---|---|
| 2004 | Starsky & Hutch | Nightclub Dancer |
| 2004 | 13 Going on 30 | Supporting dancer |
| 2004 | Death Valley | Dancer |
| 2005 | Be Cool | Kimberly Wyatt |
| 2015 | Self Made | Tinky |
| 2020 | Override | Jess |
| 2025 | The Spin | Dallas |
| 2025 | Jackie the Stripper | Daisy |

== Discography ==
=== Featured singles ===
List of featured singles, with selected chart positions and certifications, showing album name and year released
| Title | Year | Peak chart positions | | | | | Certifications | Album |
| Title | Year | IRE | LTV | POL | SCO | UK | Certifications | Album |
|---|---|---|---|---|---|---|---|---|
| "Candy" (Aggro Santos featuring Kimberly Wyatt) | 2010 | 14 | 20 | 5 | 4 | 5 | BPI: Gold | AggroSantos.com |
| "Givin' It Up" (Paul Morrell featuring Kimberly Wyatt) | 2015 | – | – | – | – | – | —N/a | —N/a |

=== Promotional single ===
List of promotional single and year released
| Title | Year | Ref. |
|---|---|---|
| "Not Just A Doll" | 2010 | |

=== Album appearances ===
List of album appearances, showing album name and year released
| Title | Year | Other artists | Album(s) | Ref. |
|---|---|---|---|---|
| "Don't Wanna Fall in Love" (Note: Each member was credited to a solo track on the European double-disc deluxe version of the album.) | 2008 | The Pussycat Dolls | Doll Domination | |
| "Derriere" (The Next Room Remix) | 2013 | —N/a | DMC Dance Mixes 85 | |
| "Take the Tour" | 2013 | Rev Run | Rewind | |
| "Speed of Light" | 2016 | Bodybangers | Bang the House | |

=== Music videos ===
| Title | Year | Other performer(s) | Director(s) | Ref. |
As a featured artist
| "Candy" | 2010 | Aggro Santos | Emil Nava | |
Guest appearances
| "Shut Up" | 2003 | Nick Lachey | Bille Woodruff | |
| "Shut Up" | 2003 | Black Eyed Peas | The Malloys | |
| "Trouble" | 2003 | Pink | Sophie Muller | |
| "Woman Up" | 2014 | Ashley Roberts | Ramy Dance | |

== Grammy nomination ==
In 2007, "Stickwitu" was nominated for Best Pop Performance by a Duo or Group with Vocals, losing out to "My Humps".
